= Muscovado =

Type of unrefined brown sugar

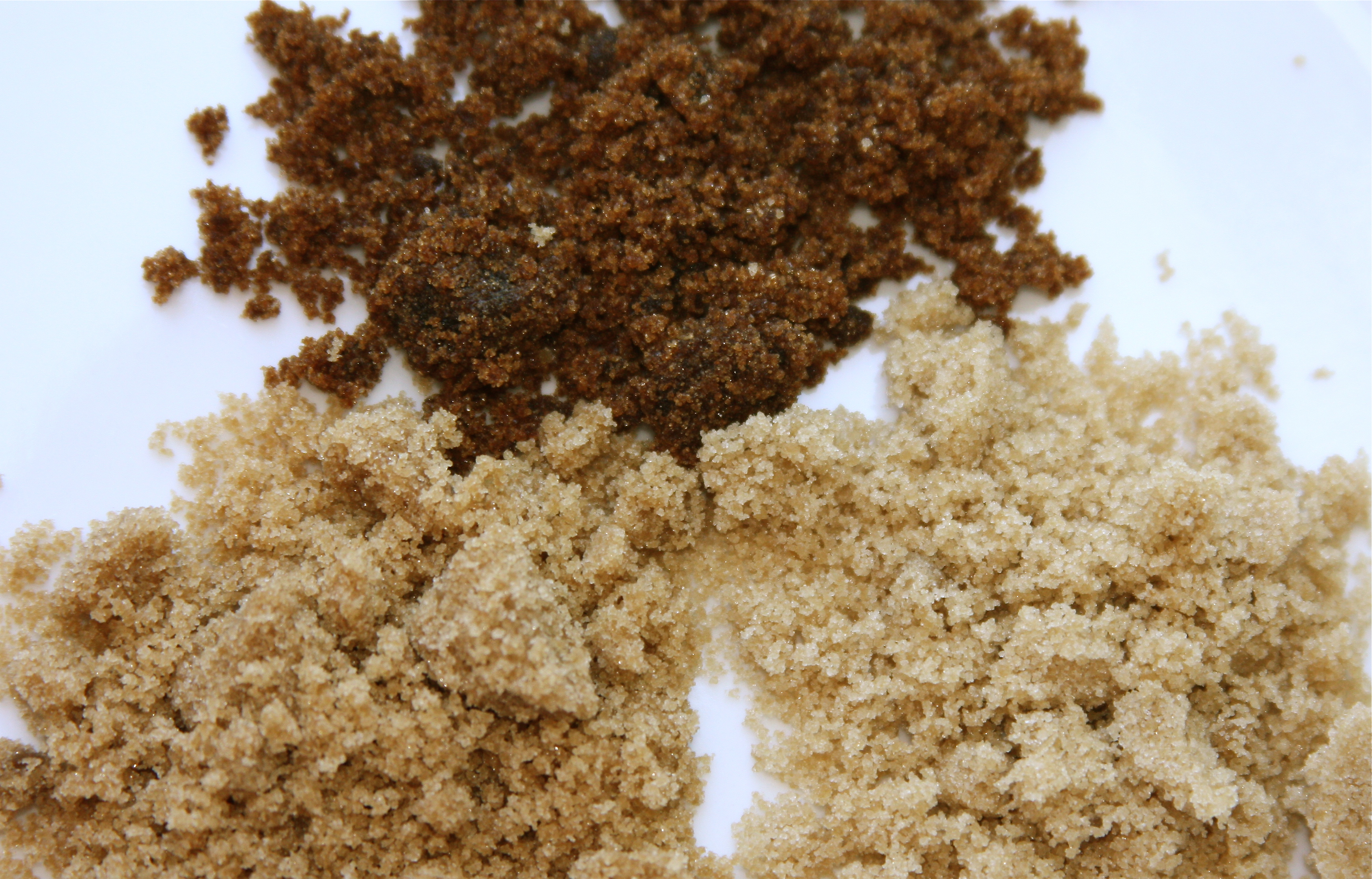
Brown sugar types: muscovado (top), dark brown (left), light brown (right)

Muscovado (also known as dark cane sugar) is a type of partially refined to unrefined sugar with a strong molasses content and flavour, and dark brown in colour. It is technically considered either a non-centrifugal cane sugar or a centrifuged, partially refined sugar according to the process used by the manufacturer. Muscovado contains higher levels of various minerals than processed white sugar. Its main uses are in food and confectionery, and the manufacturing of rum and other forms of alcohol. The largest producer and consumer of muscovado is India.

== Terminology ==
The English name "muscovado" is derived from a corruption of Portuguese açúcar mascavado (unrefined sugar).

There is no legal definition of muscovado, and no international standards for it such as Codex Alimentarius or "protected designation of origin". This has led to manufacturers calling various sugar products "muscovado", and has led to confusion between muscovado, brown sugar, and even jaggery.

== History ==
The earliest known production of crystalline sugar began in northern India, after the introduction of sugarcane by Austronesian traders from Maritime Southeast Asia at around 1000 BCE. However, the exact date of the first cane sugar production is unclear. The earliest evidence of sugar production comes from ancient Sanskrit and Pali texts. Around the 8th century, Muslim and Arab traders introduced sugar from medieval India to the other parts of the Abbasid Caliphate in the Mediterranean, Mesopotamia, Egypt, North Africa, and Andalusia. By the 10th century, sources state that every village in Mesopotamia grew sugarcane.

The early modern era, which saw the European colonization of the Americas and Asia, also led to a rapid increase in sugar production. Sugar plantations were established in numerous places colonized by European nations, such as islands in the Indian Ocean, the West Indies and South and North America. Labor for these plantations were typically provided by indentured servants, slaves or kidnapped Pacific Islanders, which saw the rise of the transatlantic and Indian Ocean slave trades to supply enslaved laborers to cash crop plantations (including those producing sugar). Sugarcane was typically refined into raw sugar or distilled into rum on colonial plantations or sent elsewhere to be processed.

Raw sugar was brought to port in a variety of purities that could be sold either as raw sugar directly to market for producing alcohol, or as muscovado exported to sugar refineries in Europe and the Americas. In 19th-century Europe, raw sugars that had been refined enough to lose most of their molasses content were labeled as raw sugar and deemed higher quality, while poor quality sugars with a high molasses content were referred to as muscovado, though the term brown sugar was sometimes used interchangeably.

== Production ==
=== Production methods ===
Traditional non-centrifugal sugar production

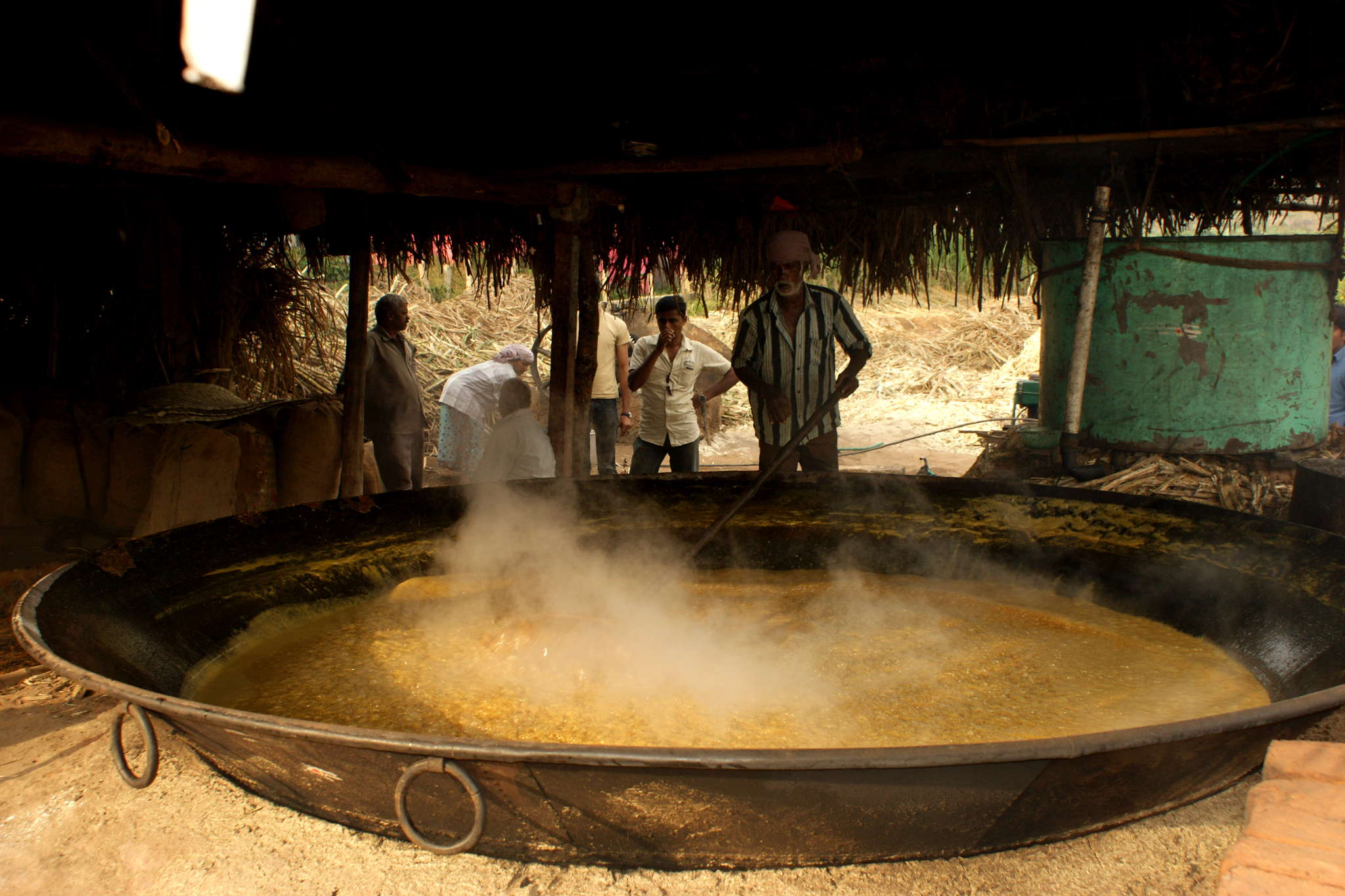
Boiling sugarcane juice to make molasses

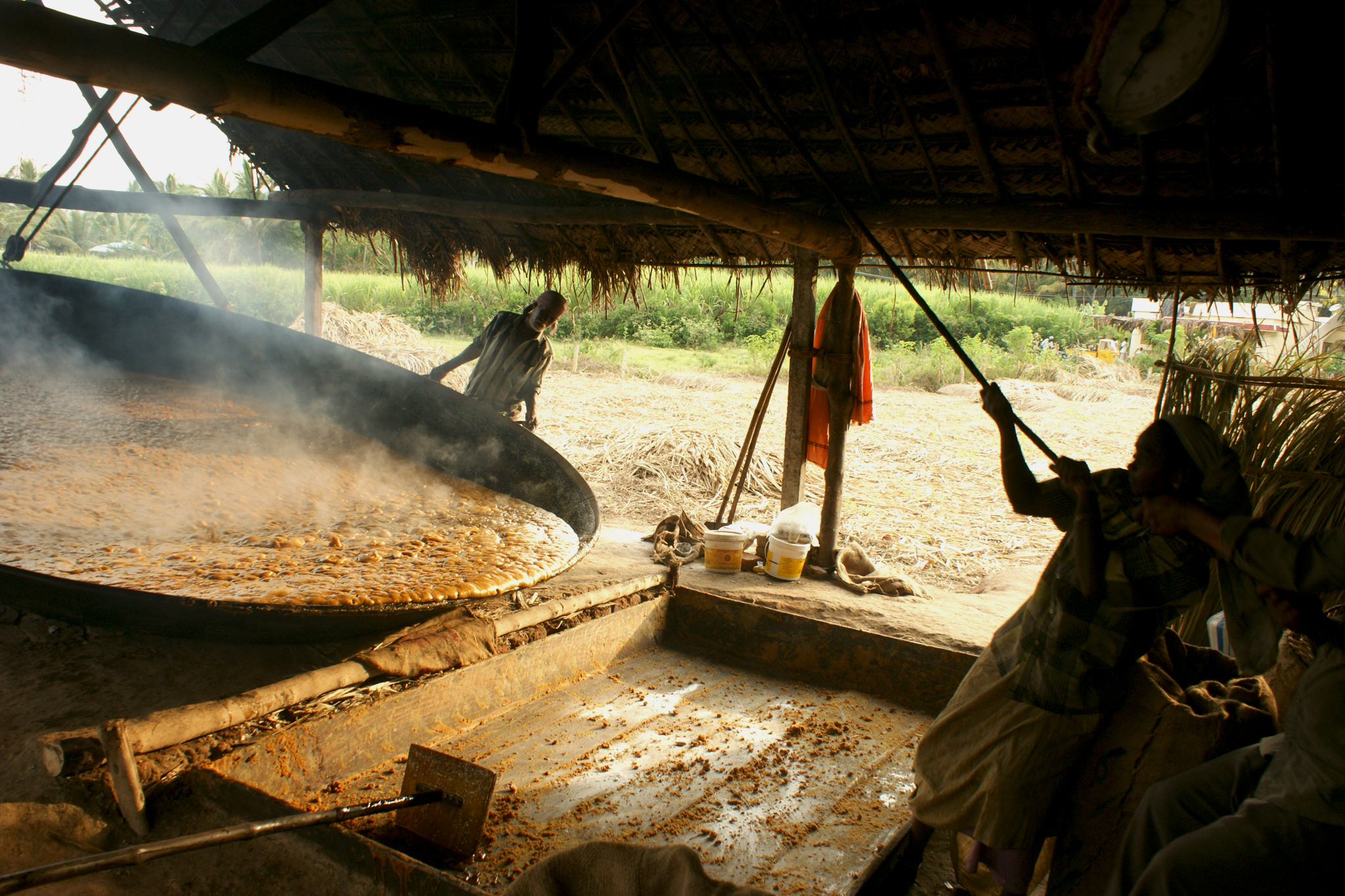
Pouring molasses for granulation by shearing

Muscovado is made from the juice of sugar cane that is evaporated until crystallisation occurs. The viscous suspension of crystals and mother liquor (molasses) is called massecuite. In the 19th century several techniques were used for sugar production. Muscovado is today produced by three main methods:

- The manual production method is to crystallise (granulate) massecuite by cooling it in pans and continuously shearing it by stirring with a large spatula (typically used in India) or by pressing it with the feet (typically used in Africa).
- The industrial centrifuge method invented in late 18th to early 19th century, in which massecuite is crystallised using a centrifuge to separate a crystal-rich mush that is drained of its molasses in a vessel under gravity.
- Modern industrial methods using a spray drier.

Massecuite is also used in the production of jaggery, in which it is set into moulds directly (without shearing, centrifuging, or spray drying).

=== Producer nations ===
Total global production is 10 million to 11 million tons annually by 20 nations. The largest producer is India (58%), followed by Colombia (14%), Myanmar (9%), Pakistan (6%), Brazil (4%), Bangladesh (3%), and China (3%).

In India, most khand (muscovado) is produced by 150 small to medium scale private manufacturers overseen by the Khadi and Village Industries Commission. These producers use traditional chemical-free organic manual shearing methods, each operating between 100 and 120 days per year, with a typical capacity of between 200 and 350 tons of sugarcane per day. The largest producing states in India are Maharashtra (58%), Bihar (6%), Karnataka (5%), Madhya Pradesh and Chhattisgarh (6%).

In Mauritius, muscovado is produced by centrifuging massecuite, from which the molasses is left to drain naturally.

In the Philippines, muscovado may be generated by any of the three methods. In the past, muscovado was one of the islands' prominent export commodities, especially from the Negros island region in the Western Visayas, from the 19th century until the late 1970s.

The production of muscovado in the Philippines, Barbados, and elsewhere had experienced a long period of decline when large mills took over sugar production from small farmers with small mills. In recent years an increased consumer interest in healthy and organic foods has revived interest in muscovado, creating a new market for small mills.

== Nutrition ==
When produced under regulated conditions muscovado is nutritionally richer than sugars, and retains more of the natural minerals in sugar cane juice, as shown in the following nutritional analysis (per 100 g):

- Total mineral salts 740 mg max.
- Phosphorus (P) 3.9 mg max.
- Calcium (Ca) 85 mg max.
- Magnesium (Mg) 23 mg max.
- Potassium (K) 100 mg max.
- Iron (Fe) 1.3 mg max.
- Calories 383 kCal

== Uses ==
=== Food and confectionery ===
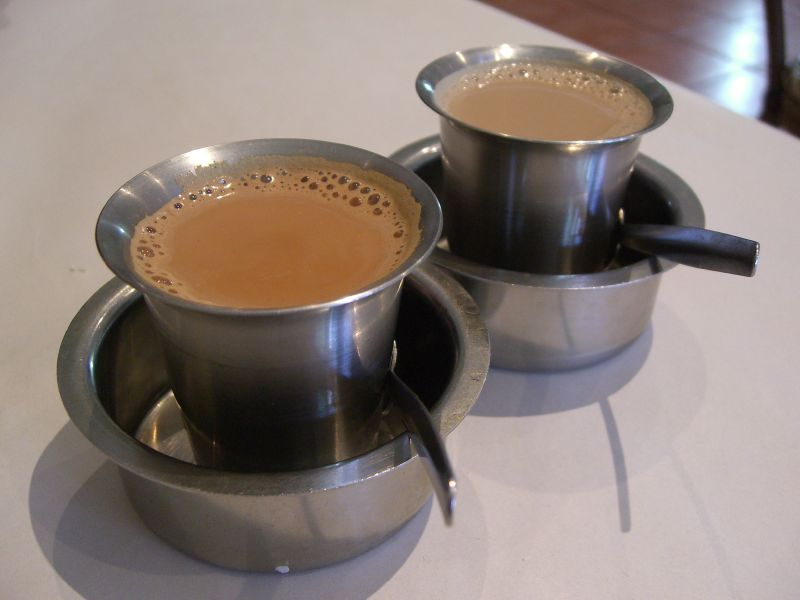
Masala tea and Indian filter coffee are sweetened with gur khand (muscovado).

Muscovado is used as an ingredient in food and confectionery, and as a sweetener in hot beverages. It is very dark brown and is slightly coarser and stickier than most brown sugars. Muscovado takes its flavor and color from its source, sugarcane juice. It offers good resistance to high temperatures and has a reasonably long shelf life.

Muscovado sugar can be substituted for brown sugar in most recipes by slightly reducing the liquid content of the recipe.

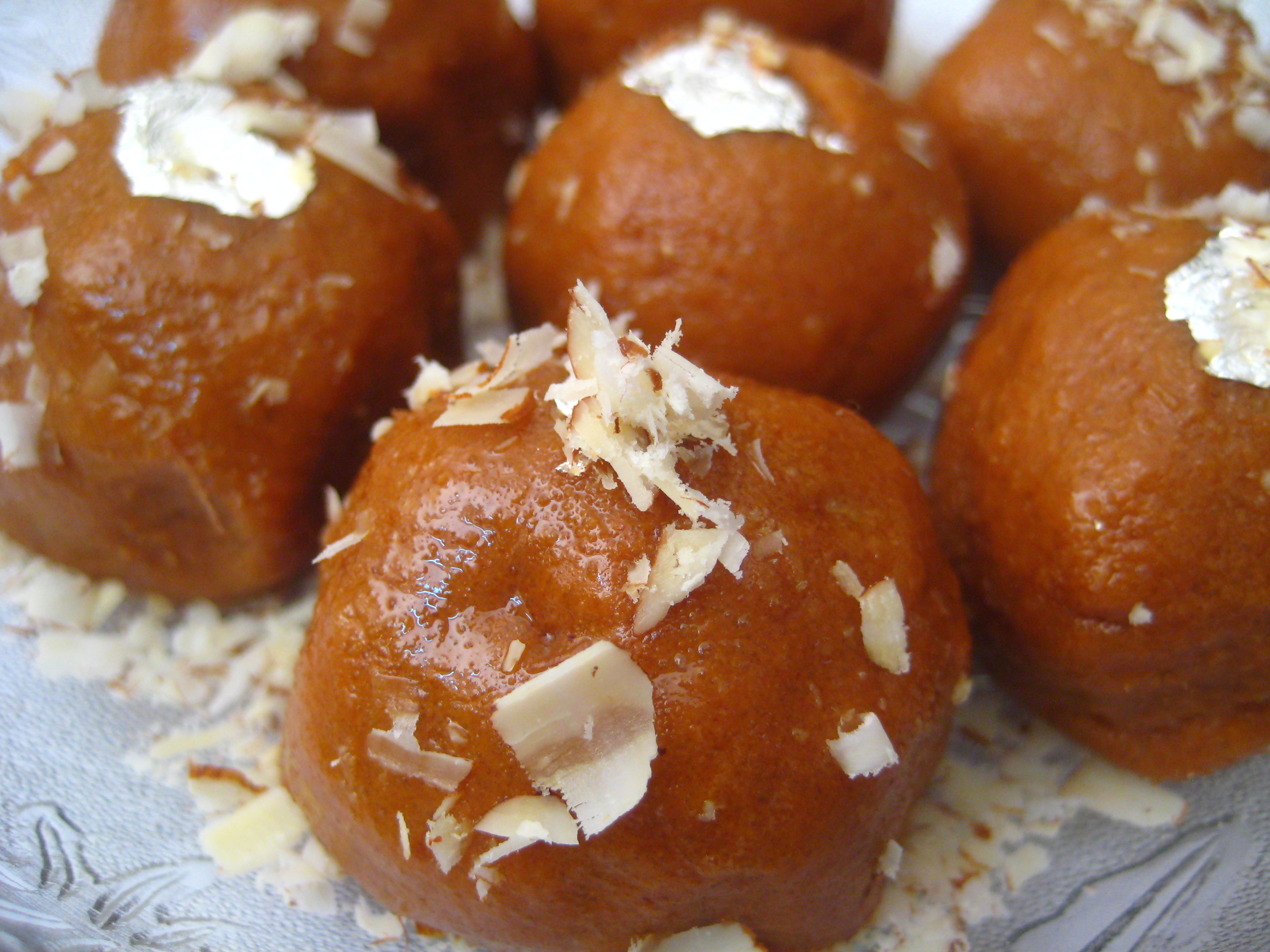
Gulab jamun, an Indian sweet prepared with khand

The use of khand in India in making sweets has been traced to at least 500 BCE, when both raw and refined sugar were used.

Along with gur, khandsari unrefined sugar is India's traditional sweetener, commonly used in traditional recipes for masala chai (spiced Indian tea), eating with roti by mixing with melted ghee, traditional Indian sweets that require sugar such as kheer (Indian rice pudding), gur or khandr chawal (sweetened rice) or laddu.

=== Alcohol ===
A significant proportion of India's production of Khandsari (muscovado) is used for the illicit production of desi daru, a distilled alcoholic drink.

== See also ==
- Indian Institute of Sugarcane Research
- Indian Sugar Mills Association
