= TRR =

TRR may refer to:

- Society for Family Development (Polish: Towarzystwo Rozwoju Rodziny), a Polish organization
- Target row refresh, a computer hardware feature used to prevent the row hammer effect in DDR4 memory
- Taushiro language (ISO 639: trr), a language isolate of the Peruvian Amazon
- Tehran Research Reactor, an Iranian nuclear research reactor, supplied by the U.S. in 1960
- Thai Roong Ruang, a sugar producer
- Three Rivers Review, a literary magazine published by the University of Pittsburgh
- Tom Rhodes Radio, an interview podcast
- TRR is the station code for Torre railway station in Devon, England
- Trottoir roulant rapide, a moving walkway in the Montparnasse–Bienvenüe Metro station, France
- Trusted Recursive Resolver, a DNS-resolving server operated by Mozilla for using DNS over HTTPS in the Firefox web browser
- Tuckerton Railroad (reporting mark TRR), a former railroad that operated in New Jersey, United States
- Tulsa Rig, Reel, and Manufacturing Company, a predecessor company of Flintco
- China Bay Airport (IATA: TRR), near Trincomalee, Sri Lanka
- Tormenta Rampaging Run, an upcoming steel roller coaster expected to open in 2026 at Six Flags Over Texas
