= Sugar industry (disambiguation) =

The sugar industry includes:

- Production of high-fructose corn syrup
- Sugar industry mainly focused on sucrose (table sugar, etc)
