= Noël Deerr =

English historian and technologist

Noël Deerr (1874 – 1953) was an English historian and technologist of the sugar industry. His major work was The History of Sugar, published in two volumes by Chapman and Hall in London, 1949–1950.

A Noël Deerr Gold Medal is awarded by The Sugar Technologists' Association of India in Deerr's memory.

== Selected publications ==
- Sugar House Notes and Tables: a Reference Book for Planters, Factory Managers, Chemists, Engineers, and Others Employed in The Manufacture of Cane Sugar. London: E. & F. N. Spon, 1900.
- Sugar and the Sugar Cane: an elementary treatise on the agriculture of the sugar cane and on the manufacture of cane sugar. Altrincham: Norman Rodger, 1905.
- Cane Sugar: a Textbook on the Agriculture of the Sugar Cane, The Manufacture of Cane Sugar, And The Analysis of Sugar-house Products. 2nd edition. London: Norman Rodger, 1921.
- "The Reduction of Sugar Factory Results to a Common Basis of Comparison", I.S.J., 35 (1933), p. 214.
- Methods of Chemical Control for Cane Sugar Factories and Gur Refineries. Cawnpore: Sugar Technologists' Association of India, 1936.
- The History of Sugar. London: Chapman and Hall, 1949–1950.
- Payne, John Howard (compiler) Noël Deerr: Classic Papers of a Sugar Cane Technologist. Amsterdam & Oxford: Elsevier, 1983.
