= Non-centrifugal cane sugar =

Traditional raw sugar obtained by evaporating water from sugarcane juice

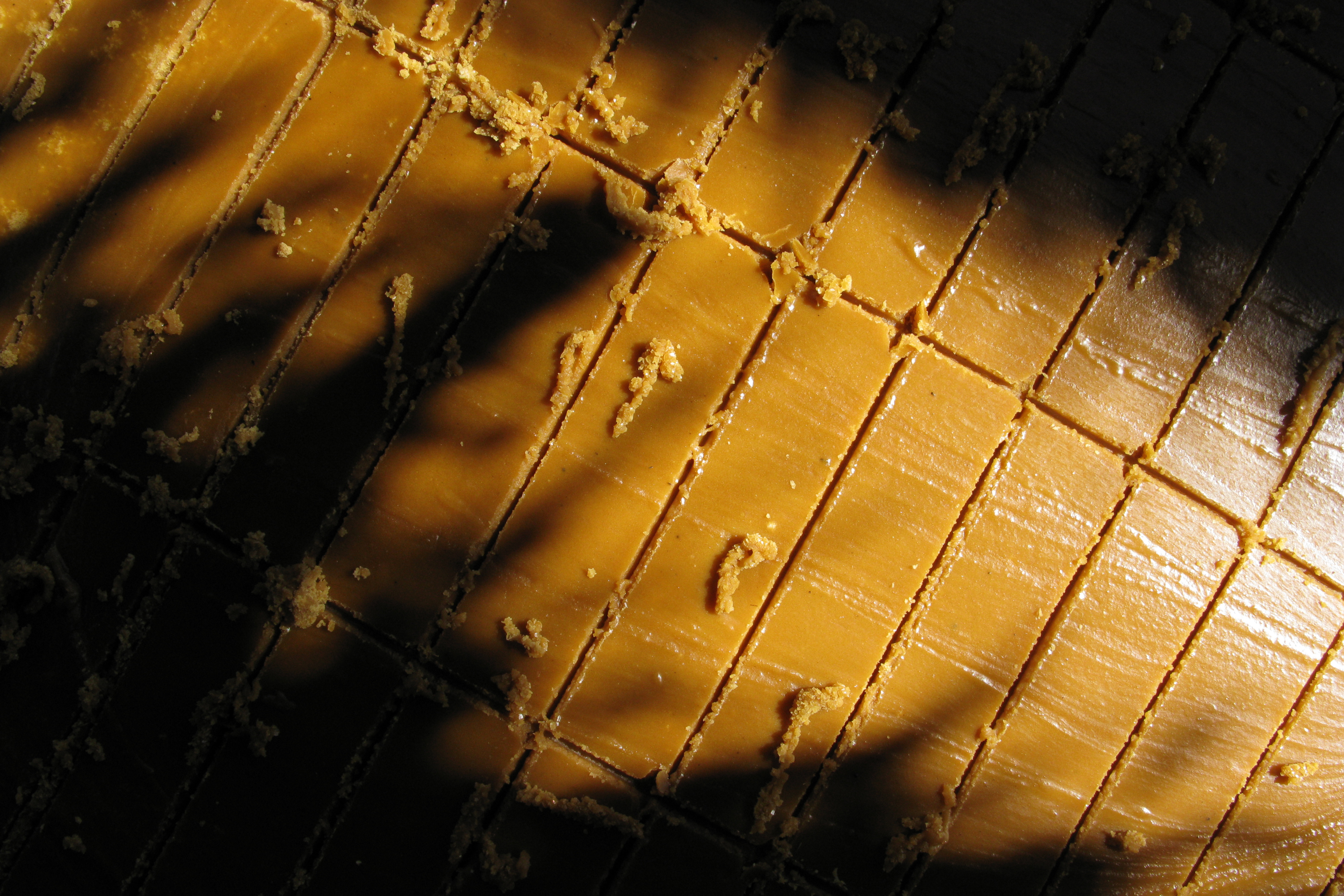
Jaggery, non-centrifugal cane sugar, Myanmar.

Non-centrifugal cane sugar (NCS) is the technical name given to traditional raw sugar obtained by evaporating water from sugarcane juice. NCS is internationally recognized as a discrete and unique product by the FAO since 1964 and by the World Customs Organization (WCO) since 2007. WCO defines NCS as "cane sugar obtained without centrifugation". It also states that "the product contains only natural anhedral micro-crystals, of irregular shape, not visible to the naked eye, which are surrounded by molasses' residues and other constituents of sugar cane". NCS is produced in most sugarcane-growing regions of the world, being known by many different names such as panela and jaggery. Some varieties of muscovado are non-centrifugal.

== Composition ==
NCS contains over 90% carbohydrate, sucrose being the predominant (near 80%) sugar. It also contains minerals (up to 3%), mainly calcium, potassium, sodium, chloride and phosphates, but also a number of essential nutrients or oligo-elements including iron, zinc, magnesium, copper, cobalt, nickel and chromium. The particular chemical composition of NCS depends on the cane variety used, the soils on which it was grown, the fertilization applied and the processing methods.

== Economy ==
Generally produced for local markets, NCS probably was the dominant form of cane sugar consumption before the advent of large-scale production of refined sugar for export markets after 1700. Today, NCS has practically disappeared in most non-sugarcane producing countries, as it is traded internationally only in small amounts. However, NCS remains important in most sugarcane producing countries, as shown by the average share in the daily consumption of caloric sweeteners (g/person/day, 2007) in the following countries: Myanmar 46%; Bangladesh 20%; Colombia 19%; India 10%; Pakistan 10%.

Most of NCS is produced on small scale in farms which process their own sugar cane using traditional technology. Production appears inefficient and its quality uneven. In some countries, such as India, Colombia, Brazil and Costa Rica, a larger scale NCS industry exists, which process cane from outside farmers using improved technology, which is centered on more efficient energy use and better processing to obtain homogeneous quality and scale-savings.

According to the United Nations Food and Agriculture Organization (FAO) world NCS production has been practically stagnant since the mid 1980s, after modest increases in the previous twenty years, stabilizing at about 12 to 14 million metric tons per year. The real amount produced may be greater given the difficulties in tracking small scale on-farm production. However, whilst production of NCS has been declining in Asia, it has been rising, even if only slowly, in Latin America. NCS production in Latin America reached an all-time high in 2011, surpassing the two million metric ton level for the first time. This compares to around 1.6 million tons 20 years earlier. In Colombia, the share of sugarcane allocated to production of NCS is now the highest worldwide, at 40%. In Brazil, output rose from an estimated 280,000 tons in 2005 to 470,000 tons in 2011. NCS is traded mostly locally in un-branded, solid presentations, such as blocks, cones or other shapes. Given the challenges associated with dealing with these solid presentations in the kitchen and in industry, such a trait restricts its consumption. In some countries (for example, Colombia, Ecuador, Venezuela and Costa Rica) solid NCS is being progressively replaced by user-friendly, branded, granulated presentations, often packed in plastic or paper bags for use at home and also as an industrial sweetener for the preparation of beverages and many other processed foods. It is also used to produce alcoholic beverages such as rum, and as a substrate for fermentation processes to produce alcohol and other derivatives.

The international trade in NCS has been small and decreasing, reaching more recently levels in the order of 50,000 tons per year. Again, the true quantities are probably greater, as NCS is classified in different ways by importing countries. The introduction of the granulated presentation has permitted the development of a small specialty market in Europe, U.S. and Japan supplied by at least a few producers from India, Costa Rica, Colombia and Brazil.

== Technology ==
NCS is clean dried sugar cane juice. Given the high sugar content of cane juice NCS is essentially made up of crystals of sucrose mixed with molasses, and many additional constituents of cane juice, like inverted sugars (glucose and fructose), minerals, vitamins, organic acids, and other trace substances, many still unknown. Depending on its manufacturing process it is either presented in solid form, known as lump sugar, or granulated form.

== Manufacturing process ==
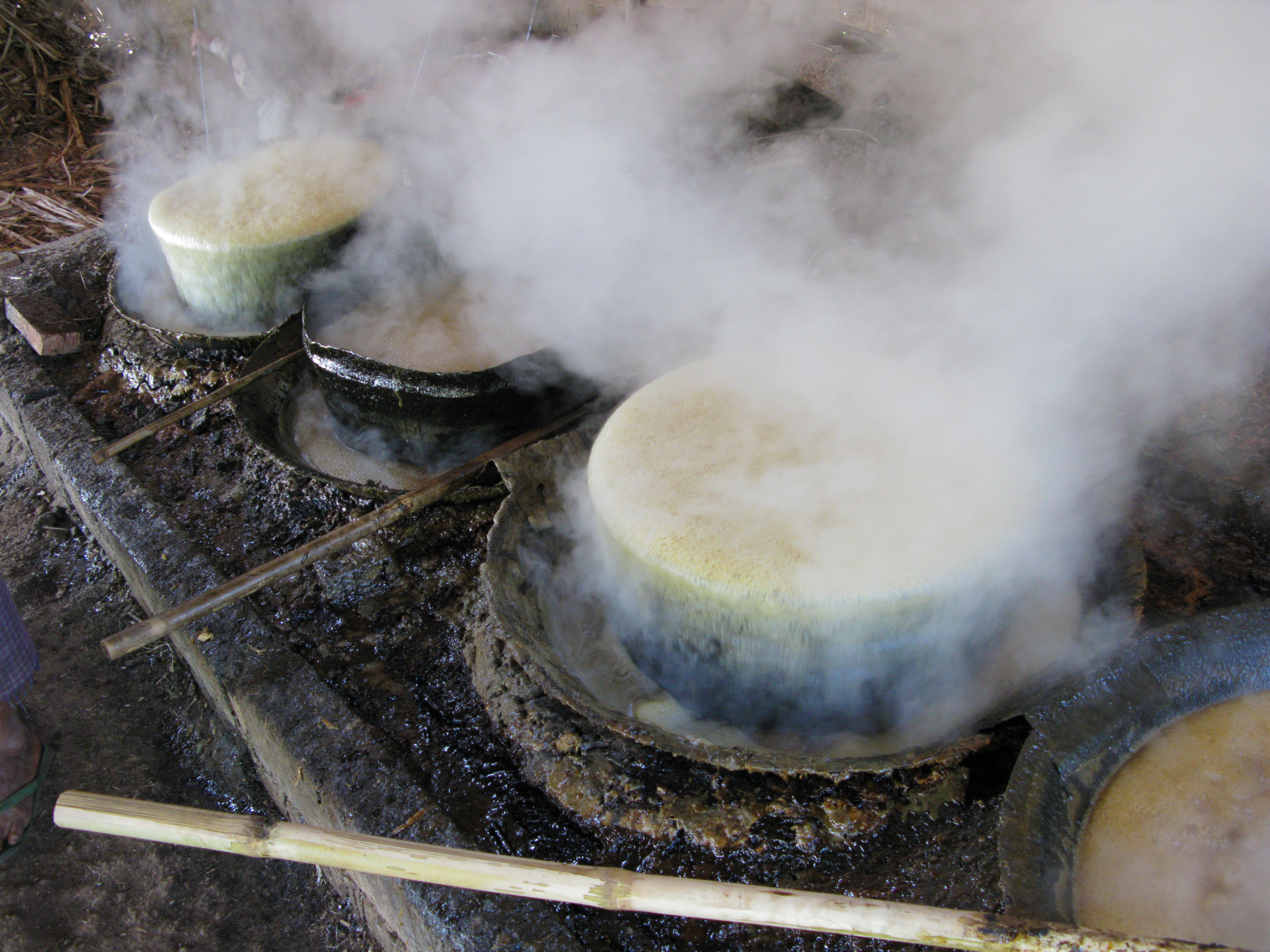
Sugar cane juice boiling, Myanmar.

Non-centrifugal cane sugar (jaggery) production near Inle Lake (Myanmar). Crushing and boiling stage.

The basic manufacture process of NCS involves juice extraction, physical elimination of impurities and clarification of the juice, evaporation of the water content of the juice, crystallization, eventually drying and packaging.

The cane juice is generally extracted from cleaned and eventually shredded cane stalks by mechanical processes, commonly with simple crushers consisting of three metal rollers. It is filtered to separate bagasse particles and/or allowed to settle so to eliminate solid impurities.

Clarification is carried out to coagulate the particulates, which come to the surface during boiling and are skimmed off. A variety of materials are used, such as plant material, ash, etc. With the aim of neutralizing the juice, which facilitates the formation of sugar crystals, lime or sulfur dioxide are added. In some of the larger factories the juice is filtered and chemically clarified.

Boiling, typically in open pans, either in a single pan or in a series of pans placed above a furnace, is how water gets evaporated. Vacuum pans are used in larger enterprises. Crystallization is accomplished in the final stage of evaporation by either pouring the heavy syrup into suitable molds to produce solid forms or swirling the syrup to produce granular result. The granulated product may be dried to enhance its flow and shelf life. Both solid and granulated presentations are then packed.

== See also ==
- Sugar § Refining (centrifugal cane sugar)
- Sugar refinery
