= Sugar side letter =

The sugar side letter was added to the North American Free Trade Agreement (NAFTA) in last minute negotiations between the Clinton Administration and the Mexican Government before the Congress approved the North American Free Trade Agreement Implementation Act (P.L. 103–182). It altered NAFTA's initial sugar provisions by adding one additional factor to the formula to be used to determine how much sugar Mexico could export to the United States through 2008. Mexican access to the U.S. market was initially set to be equal to the amount of its net sugar surplus (sugar production minus sugar consumption), subject to a maximum of 25,000 tonnes (25,000 long tons; 28,000 short tons) over the 1995-2001 period and a maximum of 250,000 metric tons in 2001–2008. The side letter changed this definition to add Mexican consumption of high-fructose corn syrup (HFCS) to the "net production surplus" definition. This change effectively lowers the amount of sugar that Mexico can sell to the U.S. market.
