= Cooperative sugar factories in Maharashtra =

Sugarcane production in Maharashtra, India

Sugarcane is a primary cash crop among farmers of the western Maharashtra region of India. Sugarcane grown in Maharashtra is mostly sold to sugar mills for sugar production. Majority of these mills are cooperatives owned by the sugarcane growers. Solapur district has the highest number of sugar factories in Maharashtra.

== History ==
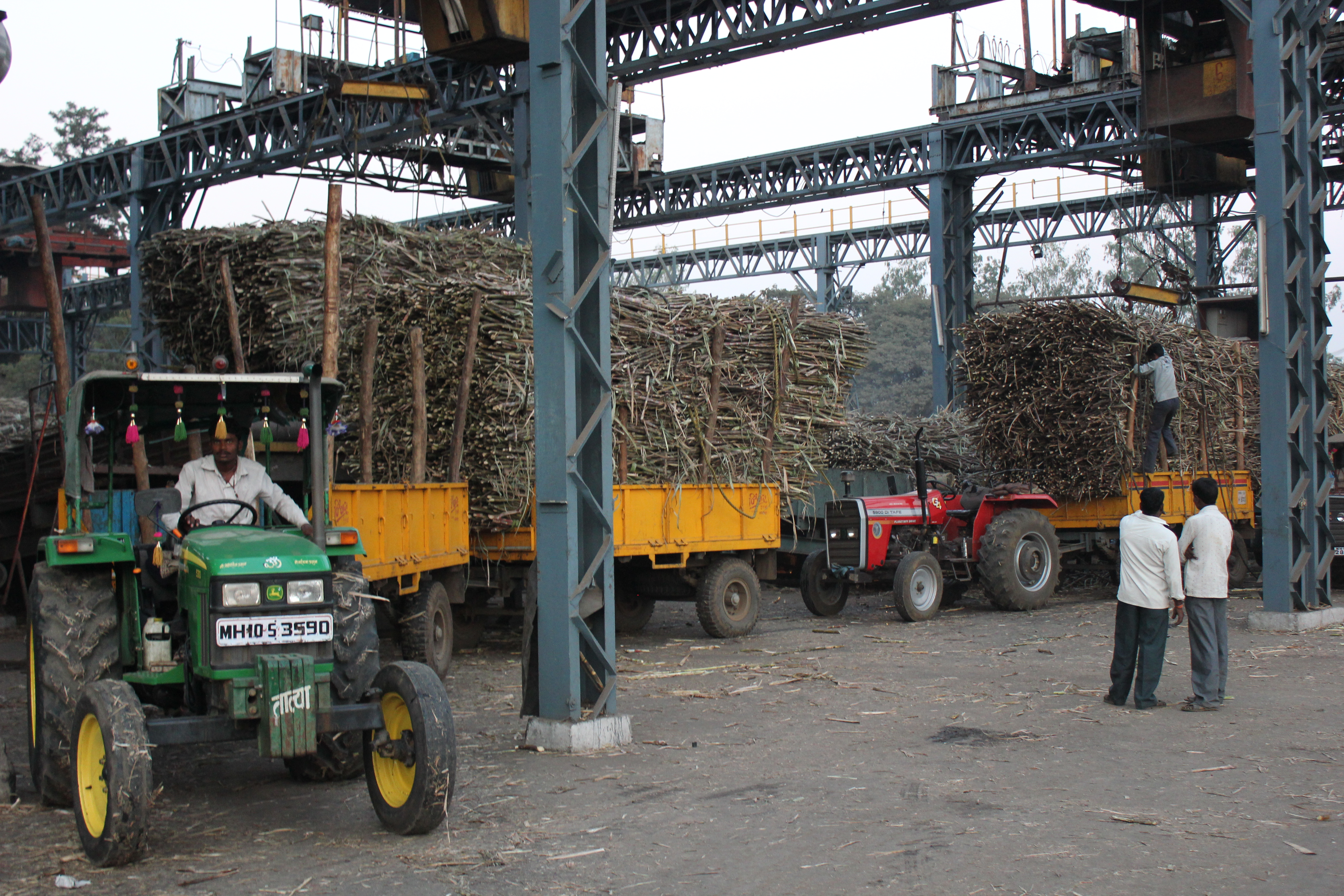
Sugarcane weighing at a cooperative sugar mill in Maharashtra, India.

The cooperative movement for the sugar industry started in the 1960s in Maharashtra with the announcement of 12 places in the state where sugar factories could be established. The then Bombay state government announced a capital share of one million rupees to establish sugar factories at these potential 12 places. A central committee was formed by Bombay State Cooperative Bank under the chairmanship of economist Dhananjayrao Gadgil. Asia's first cooperative sugar factory was established at Pravaranagar in the Ahmednagar District of the then Bombay state in 1950 by Vithalrao Vikhe Patil, & Gadgil.The sugar mill, called Pravara Sahakari Sakhar Karkhana Ltd, had majority ownership by the local farmers.

== Sugar cooperatives and State politics ==
Over the last sixty years, the local sugar mills have played a crucial part in encouraging rural political participation and as a stepping stone for aspiring politicians. In Maharashtra there are a large number of politicians with ties to sugar cooperatives from their respective local areas. Unfortunately, mismanagement and manipulation of the cooperative principles has made a number of these operations inefficient.

== Present scenario ==
In 2016, there were 173 cooperative sugar factories in operation. Maharashtra accounts for 20% of sugar production in India behind Uttar Pradesh at 24%. The presence of this industry has led to development of rural places, from which the sugarcane is drawn to factories, including an improved road network, transportation facilities, medical facilities, education facilities, and banking. Sugar mills in Maharashtra produced just over 100,000 tons of sugar in 2017-18 season, however the glut in global sugar production and the subsequent price crash has led to sugar factories not being able to pay the farmers to the tune of 20 billion rupees (US $300 million). Loss making has led to a significant increase in private ownership of sugar factories. In 2001, 14.6% of sugar mills in Maharashtra were in private hands; by 2022 this share had gone up to almost 50%.

To increase revenue, many sugar mills have extended their product mix by utilizing the byproducts of sugarcane processing. These include bagasse, molasses, and press mud. Bagasse is used by mills to produce electricity to use it in the plant or sell it to the grid. Molasses has been used to make liquor, and now to market alcohol (ethanol) as an additive to petrol. Press mud has been used to make fertilizer, as well as in the production of biogas. The Government of Maharashtra has approved a policy permitting sugar factories to establish projects for processing these sugarcane by-products under the build–operate–transfer (BOT) and build–own–operate–transfer (BOOT) models.

== See also ==
- Cooperative movement in India
