= European Association of Sugar Manufacturers =

European sugar industry association

The European Association of Sugar Manufacturers (Comité Européen des Fabricants de Sucre - CEFS), founded in 1953 and now headquartered in Brussels, is a European sugar industry association. CEFS members are national sugar-producing companies. CEFS is structured into a permanent secretariat, the CEFS Decision-making bodies and CEFS Working Bodies (two committees and 8 working groups).

== Mission ==
Through its activities, CEFS aims at ensuring and/or supporting: sustainable sugar production for EU operators, growers, employees, and consumers; the proper functioning of the EU single market; and a level playing field on the world stage.

CEFS works inter alia to:

- Facilitate the joint analysis and resolution of problems relating to market management, nutrition, environment and sustainability, and trade.
- Carry out studies relating to agricultural and technological problems connected with the sugar industry.
- Organise meetings of a scientific and/or technical nature.
- Collect, to this effect, information of a statistical or documentary nature.
- Ensure the representation of members towards the European and international institutions.

== Organisation ==
The CEFS secretariat provides its members with all relevant information on the development of European legislation. It promotes dialogue, participates in scientific research, carries out economic studies, and arranges for the adoption of common positions whenever necessary. The secretariat seeks to ensure that the unanimous positions of CEFS’ members are taken into account by the European and international institutions.

The supreme decision-making body of CEFS is its general assembly, composed of all CEFS members. There it holds the statutory elections, adopts the budgets, and determines major policy guidelines. The board of directors, elected by the general assembly, manages all the dossiers dealt with by the committees and working groups, with the guidance of the secretariat. The president of the CEFS, elected for a renewable term of office of three years, is the prime mover. He is assisted in his work by a "high-level group of advisers", the presidium, whose members are also elected for three years, and by the CEFS secretariat.

Eight working groups operate under the supervision of two committees, each chaired by a member of the presidium. The working groups deal with the technical aspects of all dossiers affecting the sugar industry. The committees prepare positions to be submitted to the board of directors and call in external experts to enlighten the debates as required.

== Members ==
Industrial manufacturers of white sugar from EU Member States and from Switzerland may apply for membership as full members of CEFS.

National organisations representing industrial manufacturers from EU Member States and from Switzerland may apply for membership of CEFS as representative members playing a purely advisory role.

Raw sugar manufacturers in the French Overseas Departments and European raw sugar refiners, or their representative organisations, may apply for membership as associate members of CEFS. They participate in the work of CEFS in a purely advisory capacity.

Legal persons with a legitimate interest in the pursuance of certain objectives of CEFS may apply for membership as corresponding members. Corresponding members take part in the work of CEFS when they are invited to do so and play only an advisory role.
