= Sugar Nutrition UK =

British lobbying group

- Defunct: 2016
- Type: Lobby group
- Purpose: Advocacy for the sugar industry; nutrition research and public policy
- Headquarters: United Kingdom
- Region served: United Kingdom
- Key people: Dr Alison Boyd (Director)
- Formerly called: British Sugar Bureau

Sugar Nutrition UK formerly the British Sugar Bureau was a lobby group for the British sugar industry.

Dr Alison Boyd was the director of the organisation. She says, in reply to proposals to tax sugar that "Singling out sugar may seem a simple, quick fix solution but risks ignoring many other factors that can contribute to lifestyle diseases." According to the organisation "Sugar consumption in the UK has declined whilst obesity and diabetes rates have increased".

It funded a study published in the American Journal of Physiology – Endocrinology and Metabolism in 2015 which showed that Sugar and water was 'as good as a glucose and water' at maintaining liver glycogen stores during prolonged exercise.

It disbanded in 2016.
