= Sugar industry in India =

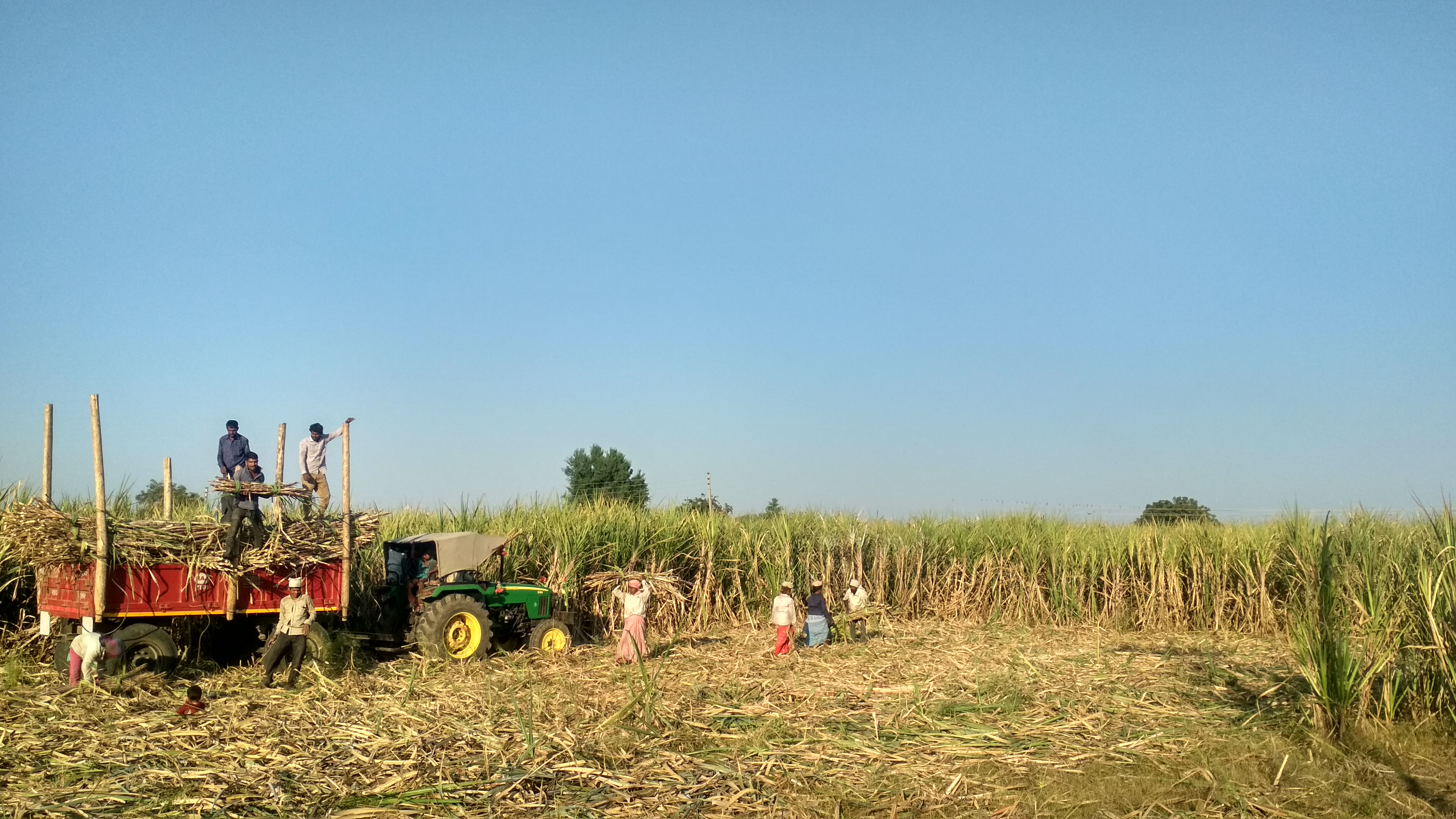
Sugar cane cutting

Sugar has been produced in India since ancient times, or at least 1200 BC. It then spread to other parts. Sugarcane is a native of tropical Indian subcontinent then to Southeast Asia. In India, sugarcane is planted thrice a year in October, March and July depending on part of the country. Most of the sugar production in India takes at local Cooperative Sugar mills. After gaining Independence, India made serious plans for overall industrial development of sugar industry.

== Market ==
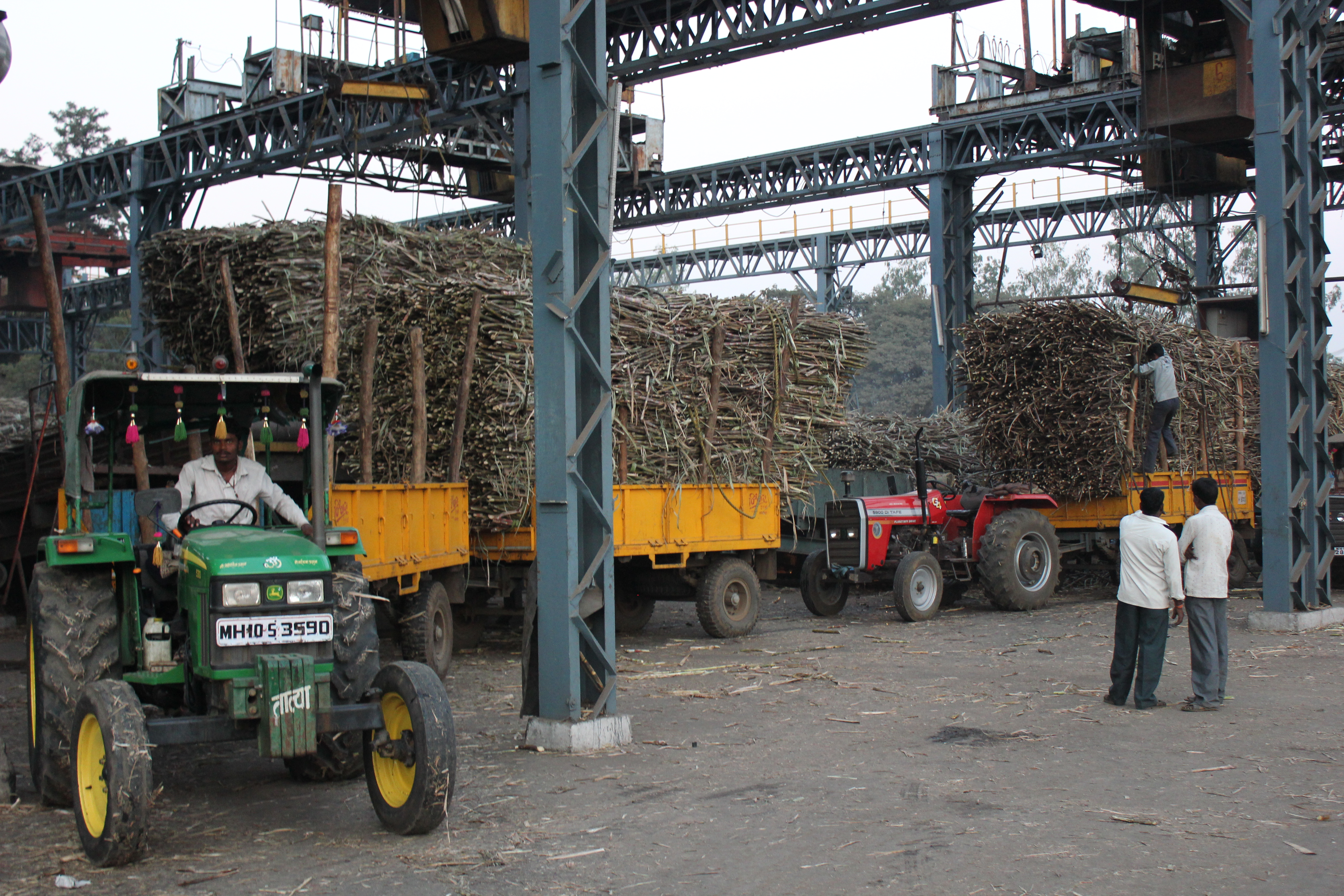
Sugarcane weighing at sugar mill

Sugar industry is a big business in India. Around 525 mills produced more than 30 million tonnes of sugar in the last crushing season, which lasted from October to April. This makes it the world's largest producer, unseating Brazil. Some 50 million farmers and millions of more workers, are involved in sugarcane farming. India is the world's largest consumer of sugar. According to data from the Indian Sugar Mills Association, the country's sugar mill produce 268.21 lakh (26,821,000) tonnes of sugar between October 1, 2019, and May 31, 2020.

On May 24, 2022, the Indian government announced that India will restrict the export of sugar from June 1, 2022. This restriction has been ordered to maintain domestic availability and ensure price stability.

== Production of sugar cane in India ==
Sugar cane is very important input for making sugar. When production of sugar cane increases, sugar production also increases. Sugar cane's production increased from 110 million tonnes in year 1961 to 405 million tonnes in year 2019. Sugar cane are grown in 2413 thousand hectare in 1961 year to 5061 thousand hectare in year 2019. Production quality for sugar cane is also increased. Production quantity improved from 45 tonnes/hectare to 80 tonnes/hectare.

Year	Hectare (thousand)	Production tonnes/hectare	Production (million tonnes)
1961	2,413	45	110
1971	2,615	48	126
1981	2,666	58	154
1991	3,686	65	241
2001	4,315	68	296
2011	4,944	69	342
2019	5,061	80	405

== Production of sugar cane by state ==
Traditionally, Uttar Pradesh and Maharashtra produce the majority of sugar cane in India. This can be attributed to rich soil surrounding major rivers present in both states. However, in 2019 Maharashtra was hit with floods thus affecting total production.

Production by state (2017–18)
State	Production(1000 tonnes)	Share(Percentage)
Uttar Pradesh	177,060.00	46.75
Maharashtra	83,130.00	22.06
Karnataka	28,260.00	7.50
Tamil Nadu	16,540.00	4.39
Bihar	13,980.00	3.71
Gujarat	12,050.00	3.20
Haryana	9,630.00	2.56
Punjab	8,020.00	2.13
Andhra Pradesh	7,950.00	2.11
Uttarakhand	6,300.00	1.67
Madhya Pradesh	5,430.00	1.44
Telangana	2,560.00	0.68
Others	5,980.00	1.59

== Products and by-products ==
The processing of sugarcane generates bagasse, molasses and press mud. Indian sugar industry has been using these by-products to generate bioethanol, electricity and many other products over the years.

== Organisations ==
- Indian Sugar Mills Association (ISMA)
- All India Sugar Trade Association (AISTA)
- National Sugar Institute (NSI)
- The Sugar Technologists Association of India (STAI)

== See also ==
- Cooperative sugar factories in Maharashtra
- Indian Institute of Sugarcane Research
- History of sugar
