= Türkşeker =

Largest sugar company in Turkey

Türkiye Şeker Fabrikaları A.Ş.
- Trade name: Türkşeker
- Type: State-owned enterprise Anonim şirket
- Incorporated: 6 July 1935; 91 years ago
- Headquarters: Ankara
- Key people: Muhiddin Şahin (General Director)
- Website: Official website

Türkiye Şeker Fabrikaları A.Ş. (English: Turkey Sugar Factories Inc.), trading as Türkşeker, is the largest and only state-owned sugar company in Turkey. It produces over a third of the country’s sugar and the government controls the price of sugar beet.
