= Society for Family Development =

Society for Family Development (Polish: Towarzystwo Rozwoju Rodziny (TRR)) is a Polish organization founded in 1957, aiming to promote the sex education of young people, providing assistance and support to individuals and couples in crisis situations, as well as providing care in the field of sexual health.

At the time of its founding, the organization was called the Society of Conscious Motherhood. In 1959 it was admitted to the International Planned Parenthood Federation (IPPF). In 1960 the first national congress of the Society, members were organized. The name of the organization was changed again in 1970, to the Society for Family Planning. Since 1979 the present name – Society for Family Development - is still in use. At the moment of its widest coverage (1988) The company had 8 clinics, 23 premarital clinics and family counseling, 3 youth clinics, 4 antenatal and 40 branches in different provinces. People connected with the Society: sexologists prof. Mikołaj Kozakiewicz – longtime chairman of the TRR, Kazimierz Imieliński, Michalina Wisłocka and Zbigniew Lew-Starowicz.

The Society is currently a member of the International Planned Parenthood Federation and the Federation for Women and Family Planning.

== Tasks and objectives ==
The main tasks of the Society include: support for women and men in their right to decide the number and spacing of their children's birthdays, promotion of family planning movement through: information, counseling and advocacy, and collaboration with all stakeholders. Society for their actions emphasizes the importance of prevention care for the health of women of reproductive age and the health of mother and child, by disseminating information and specific services. An important task is to fight for equal rights for men and women and help women in a bid to fully participate in public, political and economic life.

The objectives of the Society are:

- increasing the level of sex education in schools and in the family
- improving general awareness on the benefits of family planning
- providing access to services in the field of sexual and reproductive health
- reducing the number of unwanted pregnancies
- reducing the incidence of sexually transmitted diseases, especially HIV / AIDS

== Services TRR Facilities also provide ==
- sexology advice and treatment (Warsaw, Lublin);
- endocrine advice (Warsaw);
- andrologic advice (Warsaw, Kraków and Lublin);
- pediatric advice – internist (Kraków);
- cytohormonalne survey (Warsaw, Kraków);
- persufflation (inspection of fallopian tubes) (Warsaw);
- semen analysis (Warsaw, Kraków and Lublin);
- cryotherapy, electrocoagulation (Warsaw, Kraków);
- cryosurgery (Lublin);
- USG – gynecology, pregnancy, ovulation monitoring (Warsaw, Kraków)
- ultrasound – abdomen, testis, prostate, thyroid, breast, blood flow (Warsaw).
