= Indian Sugar Mills Association =

Sugar association in India

Indian Sugar Mills Association is the premier sugar organization in India. It establishes a connection between the Government and the sugar industry (private and public) in the country. The prime objective is to ensure that both private and public sugar mills in the country function in line with government policies.

The association is the oldest industrial association in India, established in 1932. It is an industrial association consisting of more than 532 public and private sector sugar mills. The current ISMA members account for 50% of total sugar manufactured in India and membership spans across major sugar producing states of India. ISMA typically lobbies with the Government of India and local state governments for the benefit and interests of sugar manufacturers. India ranks second in production of sugar in the world. ISMA works closely with Indian Sugar Exim Corporation Limited (ISEC); another association for co-operative sugar mills; and also with All India Sugar Trade Association (AISTA), an organisation representing Indian sugar traders and brokers at international level. ISMA regularly releases statistics regarding sugar output in India.

== See also ==
- Indian Institute of Sugarcane Research
