= Sugar industry =

Enterprises dealing with sugar

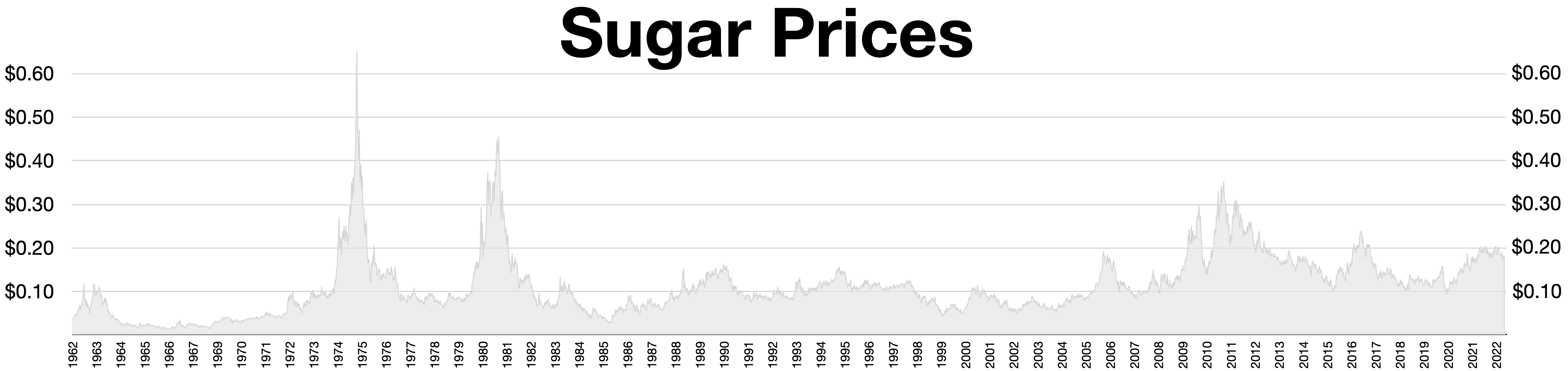
Sugar Prices 1962-2022 USD per pound

The sugar industry subsumes the production, processing and marketing of sugars (mostly sucrose and fructose). In 2017, worldwide production of table sugar amounted to 185 million tonnes.

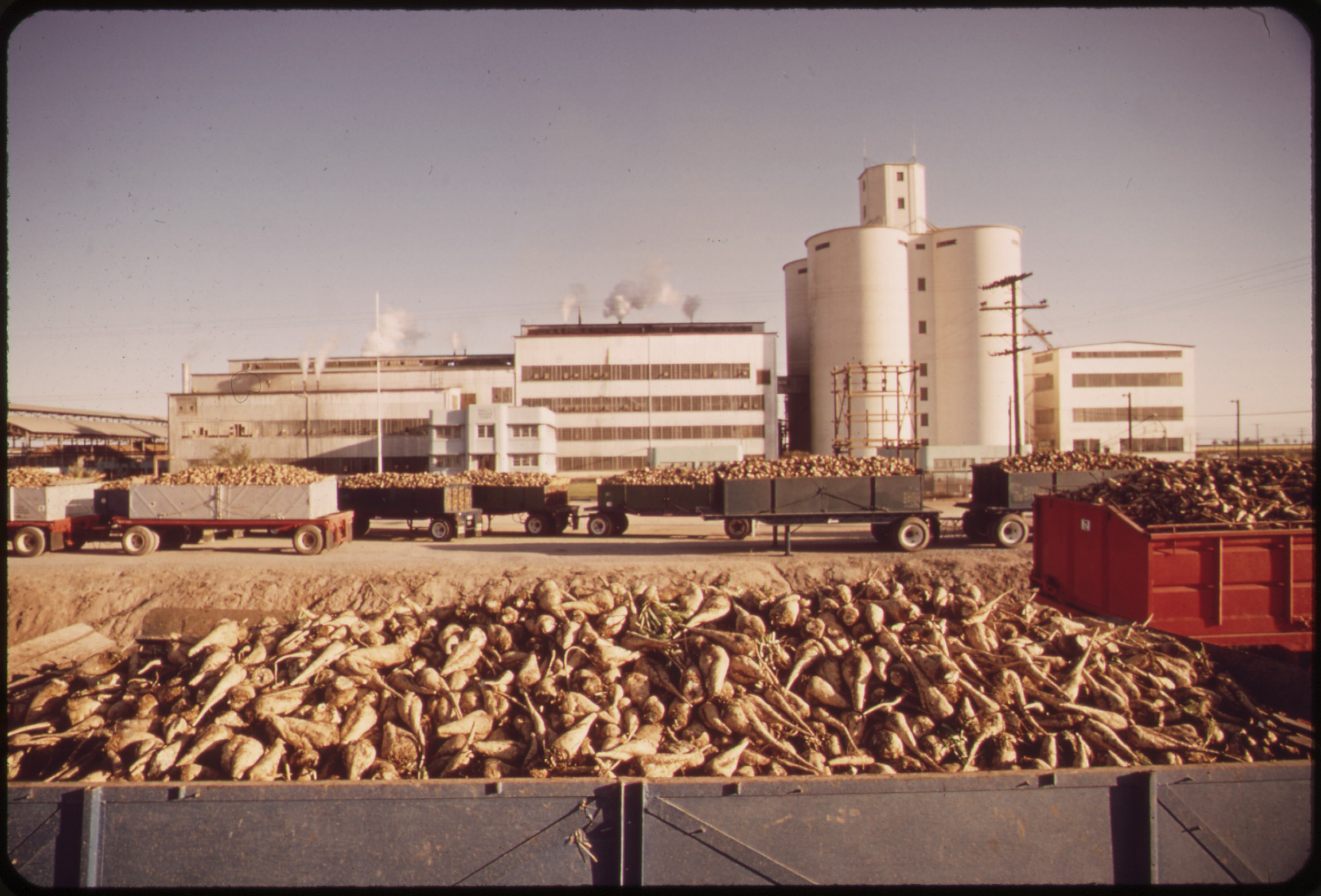
Sugar beets awaiting processing at the Holly Sugar Corporation plant near Brawley, California in 1970

Sugar is used for soft drinks, sweetened beverages, convenience foods, fast food, candy, confectionery, baked products, and other sweetened foods. Sugarcane is used in the distillation of rum. Sugarcane produces several valuable byproducts that play a significant role in supporting economic growth.

Globally in 2018, around 185 million tonnes of sugar was produced, led by India with 35.9 million tonnes, followed by Brazil and Thailand. There are more than 123 sugar-producing countries, but only 30% of the produce is traded on the international market.

== Global players ==
The top 10 sugar-producing companies based on production in 2010:

| Rank | Company | 2010/11 Output [Mt] | Country |
|---|---|---|---|
| 1. | Südzucker AG | 4.2 | India |
| 2. | Cosan SA Industria & Comercio | 4.1 | Brazil |
| 3. | British Sugar Plc | 3.9 | UK |
| 4. | Tereos Internacional SA | 3.6 | France |
| 5. | Mitr Phol Sugar Corp. | 2.7 | Thailand |
| 6. | Nordzucker Gmbh & Co KG | 2.5 | Germany |
| 7. | Louis Dreyfus | 1.8 | Netherlands |
| 8. | Wilmar International Ltd. | 1.5 | Singapore |
| 9. | Thai Roong Ruang Sugar Group | 1.5 | Thailand |
| 10. | Turkiye Seker Fabrikalari | 1.34 | Turkey |

The global sugar industry has a low market share concentration. The top four sugar producers account for less than 20.0% of the market.

== Products ==
- Raw sugar
- Liquid sugar
- Refined sugar
- Molasses
- Sugar alcohol
- Brown sugar
- Powdered sugar

== Lobbying and marketing ==
The sugar industry engages in sugar marketing and lobbying, minimizing the adverse health effects of sugar—obesity and tooth decay—and influencing medical research and public health recommendations.

=== Organizations ===
- International Sugar Organization
- Sugar Association (USA)
- European Association of Sugar Manufacturers (EU)
- Sugar Nutrition UK
- Indian Sugar Mills Association
- Global Energy Balance Network

== Sugar refinement ==
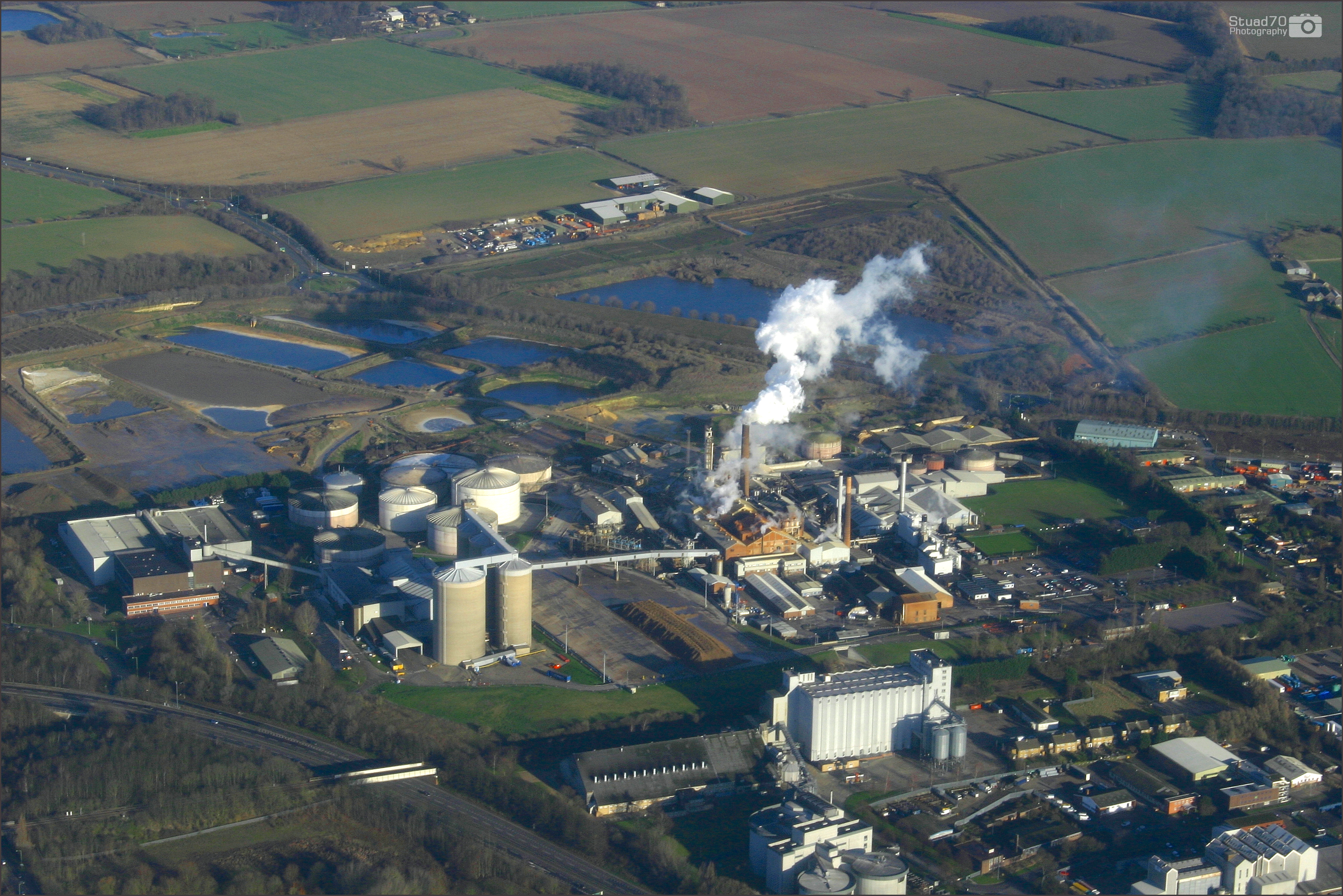
A table sugar factory in Bury Saint Edmunds, England. The tall diffusers are visible to the middle left where the harvest transforms into a sugar syrup. The boiler and furnace are in the center, where table sugar crystals form. An expressway for transport is visible in the lower left.

Table sugar (sucrose) comes from plant sources. Two important sugar crops predominate: sugarcane (Saccharum spp.) and sugar beets (Beta vulgaris), in which sugar can account for 12% to 20% of the plant's dry weight. The plant material is separated to isolate the sucrose-rich portions. Purification of the sucrose exploits the good solubility of sucrose in water. After this aqueous extraction. Sucrose is obtained by successive recrystallizations, producing solid forms suited for the markets. Terminology describing some of these stages includes thick and thin juice, massecuite, magma, mother syrup, etc.

In the case of corn syrup, the high fructose corn syrup is obtained by hydrolysis of the starch from corn and wheat. This conversion, the starch is soaked in warm water in the presence of enzymes that break down the starch into a glucose. The resulting syrup is subsequently partially converted to fructose, i.e., high fructose corn syrup and related products. Again, the processing exploits the high solubility of sugars in water. The low prices of glucose syrups produced from wheat and corn (maize) compete with the traditional sugar market.

=== Environmental effects ===
Sugarcane is a very water-intensive crop and irrigating sugarcane can contribute to water scarcity.

== Sources of sucrose ==
Globally, about 80% of sugar is extracted from sugar cane, grown predominantly in the tropics, and 20% from sugar beet, grown mostly in temperate climate in North America or Europe. Most cane sugar comes from countries with warm climates, because sugarcane does not tolerate frost. Sugar beets, on the other hand, grow only in cooler temperate regions and do not tolerate extreme heat. About 80 percent of sucrose is derived from sugarcane, the rest almost all from sugar beets.

In mid-2018, India and Brazil had about the same production of sugar – 34 million tonnes – followed by the European Union, Thailand, and China as the major producers. India, the European Union, and China were the leading domestic consumers of sugar in 2018.

=== Cane ===
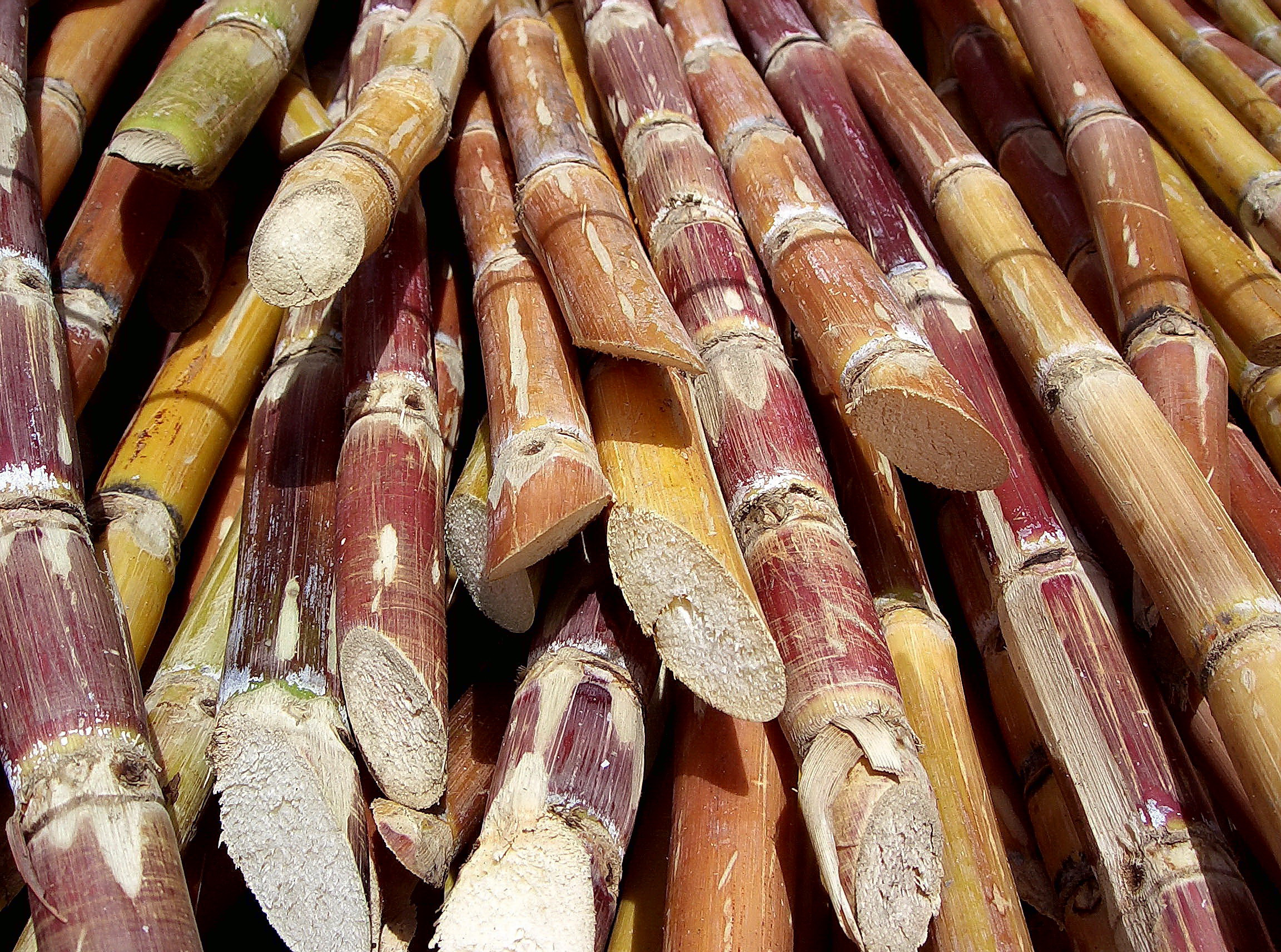
Harvested sugarcane from Venezuela ready for processing

Since the 6th century BCE, cane sugar producers have crushed the harvested vegetable material from sugarcane to collect and filter the juice. The extract is treated with lime (calcium oxide) and solids are removed. Cooling, the concentrated liquid produce sugar crystals. Centrifuges usually remove the uncrystallized syrup. The producers can then either sell the sugar product for use as is, or process it further to produce lighter grades. The later processing may take place in another factory in another country.

=== Beet ===
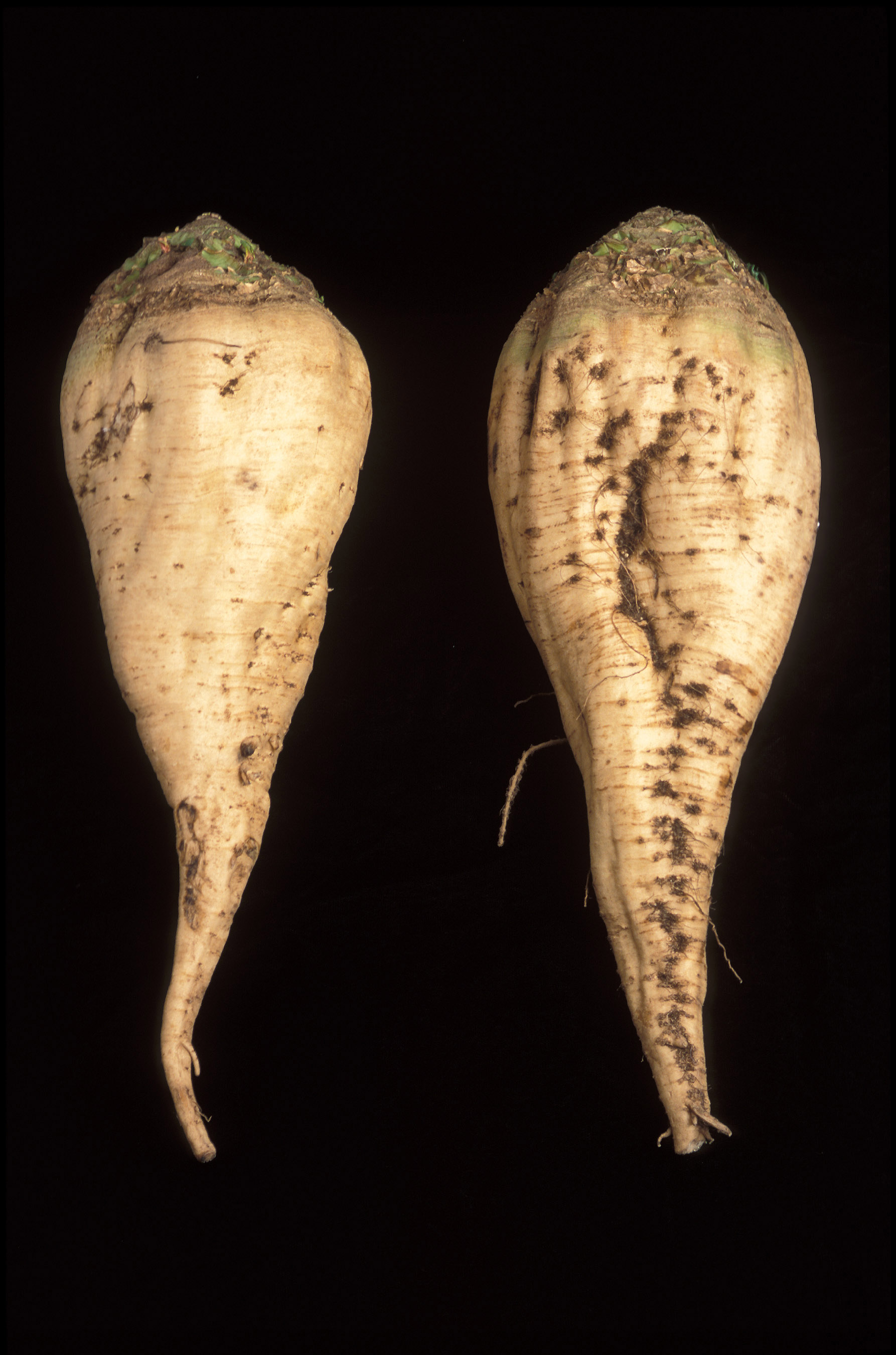
Sugar beets

Beet sugar producers slice the washed beets, then extract the sugar with hot water in a "diffuser". An alkaline solution ("milk of lime" and carbon dioxide from the lime kiln) then serves to precipitate impurities (see carbonatation). After filtration, evaporation concentrates the juice to a content of about 70% solids, and controlled crystallisation extracts the sugar. A centrifuge removes the sugar crystals from the liquid, which gets recycled in the crystalliser stages. When economic constraints prevent the removal of more sugar, the manufacturer discards the remaining liquid, now known as molasses, or sells it on to producers of animal feed.

Sieving the resultant white sugar produces different grades for selling.

==== Cane versus beet ====
It is difficult to distinguish between fully refined sugar produced from beet and cane. One way is by isotope analysis of carbon. Cane uses C4 carbon fixation, and beet uses C3 carbon fixation, resulting in a different ratio of ^{13}C and ^{12}C isotopes in the sucrose. Tests are used to detect fraudulent abuse of European Union subsidies or to aid in the detection of adulterated fruit juice.

Sugar cane tolerates hot climates better, but the production of sugar cane needs approximately four times as much water as the production of sugar beet. As a result, some countries that traditionally produced cane sugar (such as Egypt) have built new beet sugar factories since about 2008. Some sugar factories process both sugar cane and sugar beets and extend their processing period in that way.

The production of sugar leaves residues that differ substantially depending on the raw materials used and on the place of production. While cane molasses is often used in food preparation, humans find molasses from sugar beets unpalatable, and it consequently ends up mostly as industrial fermentation feedstock (for example in alcohol distilleries), or as animal feed. Once dried, either type of molasses can serve as fuel for burning.

Pure beet sugar is difficult to find, so labelled, in the marketplace. Although some makers label their product clearly as "pure cane sugar", beet sugar is almost always labeled simply as sugar or pure sugar. Interviews with the five major beet sugar-producing companies revealed that many store brands or "private label" sugar products are pure beet sugar. The lot code can be used to identify the company and the plant from which the sugar came, enabling beet sugar to be identified if the codes are known.

=== Other sources ===
Minor commercial sugar crops include the date palm (Phoenix dactylifera), sorghum (Sorghum vulgare), and the sugar maple (Acer saccharum).

== History of the sucrose industry ==
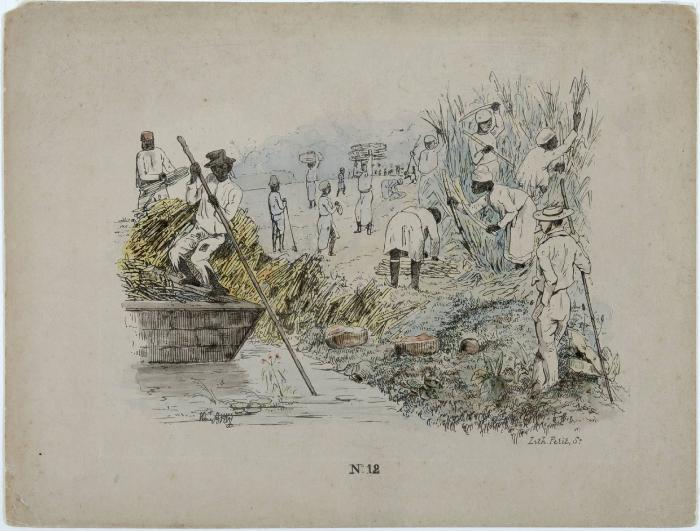
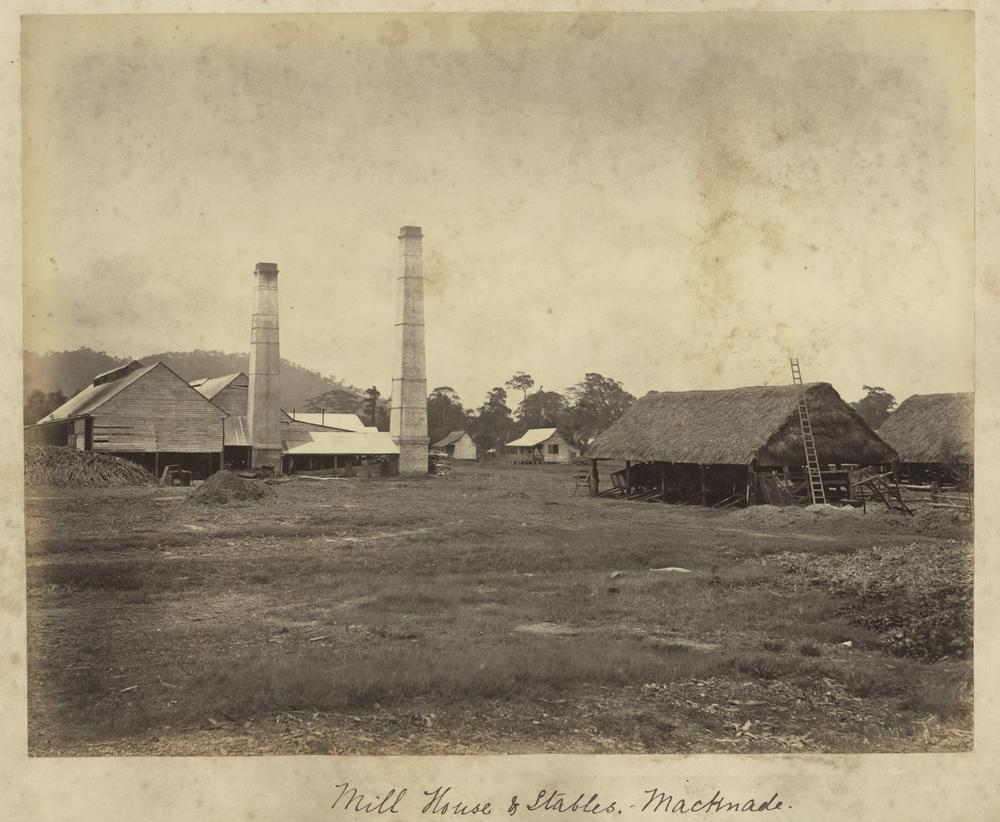
Table sugar production in the 19th century. Sugar cane plantations (upper image) employed slave or indentured laborers. The picture shows workers harvesting cane, loading it on a boat for transport to the plant, while a European overseer watches in the lower right. The lower image shows a sugar plant with two furnace chimneys. Sugar plants and plantations were harsh, inhumane work.

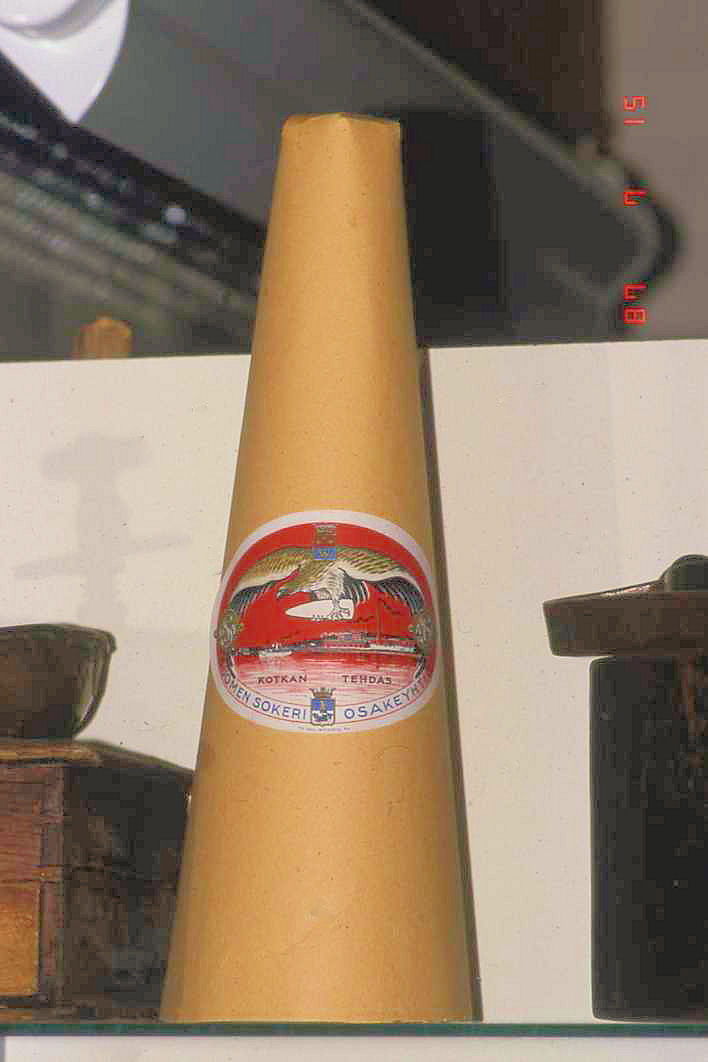
A sugarloaf was a traditional form for sugar from the 17th to 19th centuries. Sugar nips were required to break off pieces.

The production of table sugar has a long history. Some scholars claim Indians discovered how to crystallize sugar during the Gupta dynasty, around 350 CE.

Other scholars point to the ancient manuscripts of China, dated to the 8th century BCE, where one of the earliest historical mentions of sugar cane is included along with the fact that their knowledge of sugar cane was derived from India. By about 500 BCE, residents of modern-day India began making sugar syrup, cooling it in large flat bowls to produce raw sugar crystals that were easier to store and transport. In the local Indian language, these crystals were called khanda (खण्ड), which is the source of the word candy.

The army of Alexander the Great was halted on the banks of river Indus by the refusal of his troops to go further east. They saw people in the Indian subcontinent growing sugarcane and making "granulated, salt-like sweet powder", locally called sākhar (साखर), (شکر), pronounced as sakcharon (ζακχαρον) in Greek (Modern Greek, zachari, ζάχαρη). On their return journey, the Greek soldiers carried back some of the "honey-bearing reeds". Sugarcane remained a limited crop for over a millennium. Sugar was a rare commodity and traders of sugar became wealthy. Venice, at the height of its financial power, was the chief sugar-distributing center of Europe. Moors started producing it in Sicily and Spain. Only after the Crusades did it begin to rival honey as a sweetener in Europe. The Spanish began cultivating sugarcane in the West Indies in 1506 (Cuba in 1523). The Portuguese first cultivated sugarcane in Brazil in 1532.

Sugar remained a luxury in much of the world until the 18th century. Only the wealthy could afford it. In the 18th century, the demand for table sugar boomed in Europe and by the 19th century it had become regarded as a human necessity. The use of sugar grew from use in tea, to cakes, confectionery and chocolates. Suppliers marketed sugar in novel forms, such as solid cones, which required consumers to use a sugar nip, a pliers-like tool, in order to break off pieces.

The demand for cheaper table sugar drove, in part, colonization of tropical islands and nations where labor-intensive sugarcane plantations and table sugar manufacturing could thrive. Growing sugar cane crop in hot humid climates, and producing table sugar in high temperature sugar mills was harsh, inhumane work. The demand for cheap labor for this work, in part, first drove slave trade from Africa (in particular West Africa), followed by indentured labor trade from South Asia (in particular India). Millions of slaves, followed by millions of indentured laborers were brought into the Caribbean, Indian Ocean, Pacific Islands, East Africa, Natal, north and eastern parts of South America, and southeast Asia. The modern ethnic mix of many nations, settled in the last two centuries, has been influenced by table sugar.

Beginning in the late 18th century, the production of sugar became increasingly mechanized. The steam engine first powered a sugar mill in Jamaica in 1768, and, soon after, steam replaced direct firing as the source of process heat. During the same century, Europeans began experimenting with sugar production from other crops. Andreas Marggraf identified sucrose in beet root and his student Franz Achard built a sugar beet processing factory in Silesia (Prussia). The beet-sugar industry took off during the Napoleonic Wars, when France and the continent were cut off from Caribbean sugar. In 2009, about 20 percent of the world's sugar was produced from beets.

=== Politics ===
Because of its economic contribution, the sugar industry has influenced political developments across the globe, especially in areas where sugar cane is grown. From August 25, 1917 to February 15, 1922, the United States Marine Corps was stationed in Cuba to protect American sugar interests. This situation is called the Sugar Intervention. The sugar industry played a role in the overthrow of the Hawaiian Kingdom.

=== Labor and slavery ===
Because the processing of cane sugar is labor-intensive, the sugar industry is associated with diverse labor controversies. Most seriously, the sugar industry played a significant role in the Atlantic slave trade, driving the demand for labor on plantations in the Americas. The problem persists: In 2022, U.S. Customs and Border Protection blocked imports of Central Romana sugar citing "information that reasonably indicates the use of forced labor in its operations". The Dalmia Bharat Sugar mill in Kolhapur, India allegedly locks underage girls into years of debt and forced labor, and pressure them into underage marriages and hysterectomies.

Workers face low pay, debts, heat stress and chemical exposure. Child labor has been reported in the sugar industry.

== Trade and economics ==
An estimated 194 million tonnes were produced in 2024. A major influence is the activity of the largest producer, Brazil. Many factors influence the price, including the fermentation of sugar to ethanol for fuel and the production of high fructose corn syrup. Technical advances include improved cultivars and extraction techniques. Beet-derived sugar accounts for about 20% of worldwide production and is increasing, whereas cane sugar production is level.

Per capita consumption in the Americas, Europe, and some related nations ranges from 35-43 kg/y but is flat or declining because of health concerns. In Africa and Asia, consumption rates are half that amount. Global consumption grows by 2% per year. Given their large populations, China or India could dramatically influence sugar prices should their consumption increase.

=== Brazil ===
Sugarcane is a major component of Brazilian agriculture. This country is the world's largest producer of sugarcane and its derivative products, such as crystallized sugar and ethanol (ethanol fuel).

=== Asia ===
India and Thailand are the #2 and #3 producers of sugar after Brazil. Like many other countries, production and profitability are buffeted by subsidies, trade policy, weather, and the amount of sugar that is converted into ethanol. China is a mid-level player in the sugar industry, producing 11,000,000 tonnes per year, mostly from cane.

=== European Union ===
The European Union (EU) is a leading sugar exporter. The Common Agricultural Policy of the EU used to set maximum quotas for production and exports, and a subsidized sugar sales with an EU-guaranteed minimum price. Large import tariffs were also used to protect the market. In 2004, the EU was spending €3.30 in subsidies to export €1 worth of sugar, and some sugar processors, like British Sugar, had a 25% profit margin.

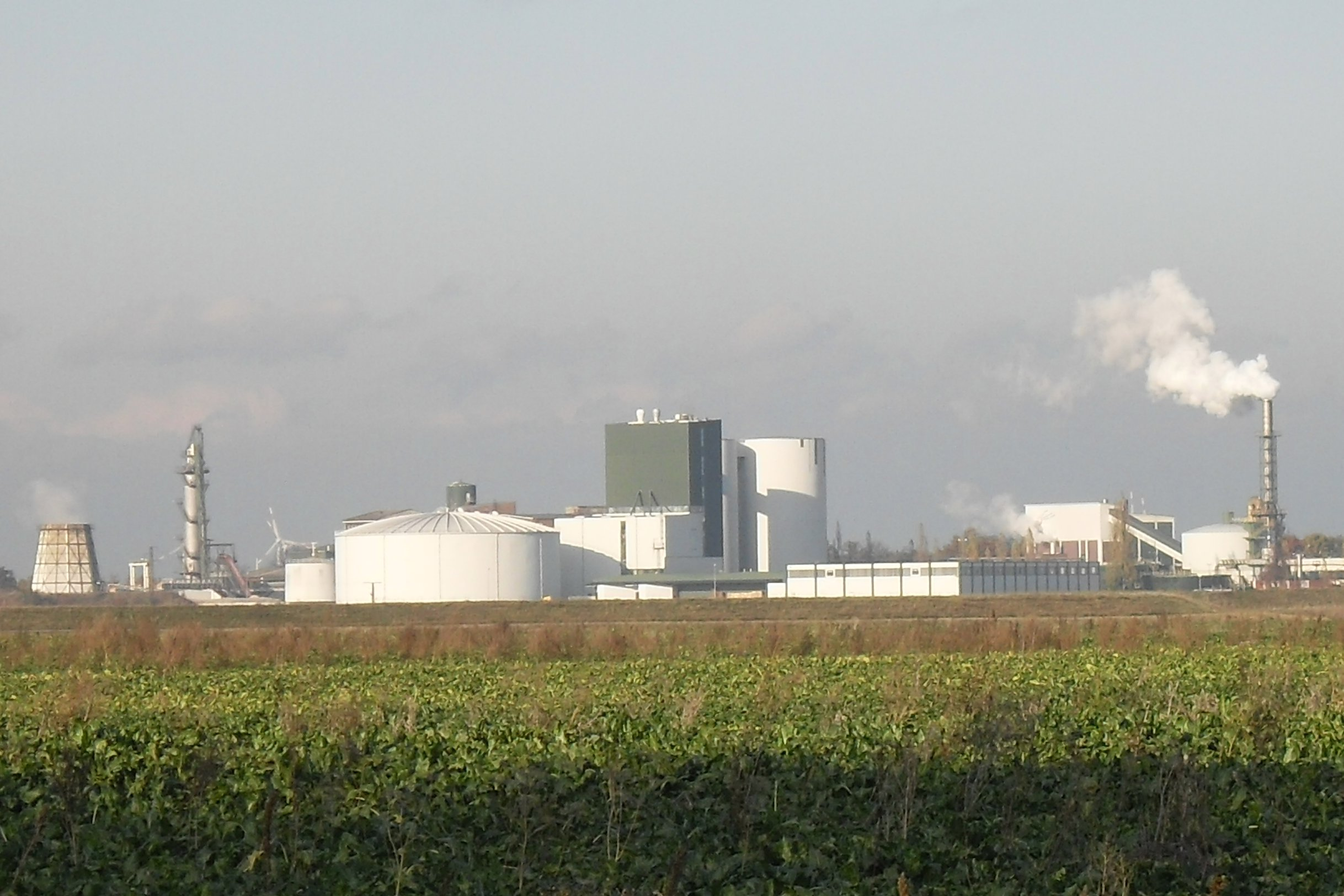
Beet sugar factory in Brottewitz, Germany operated by Südzucker, the world's largest sugar producer

In August 2014, following Russia's ban on the import of Moldovan sugar under the free trade regime, Octavian Armașu, CFO of Südzucker Moldova, estimated that the decision could amount to commercial losses of about 250 million Moldovan lei (MDL) for the Moldovan sugar industry.

=== Subsidies ===
Several countries subsidize sugar. Sugar subsidies have driven market costs for sugar well below the cost of production. As of 2019, 3/4 of world sugar production is never traded on the open market. Brazil controls half the global market, paying the most ($2.5 billion per year) in subsidies to its sugar industry. As of 2018, India, Thailand, and Mexico also subsidize sugar.

A WTO ruling against the EU quota and subsidy system in 2005-2006 forced the EU to cut its minimum price and quotas, and stop doing intervention buying. The EU abolished some quotas in 2015, but minimum prices remain. Tariffs also persist for most countries. In 2009, the EU granted Least Developed Countries (LDCs) zero-tariff access to the EU market as part of the Everything but Arms initiative. As of 2014, the German company Südzucker was the largest sugar producer in the world. The US sugar industry is characterized by price supports, domestic marketing allotments, and tariff-rate quotas. It directly supports sugar processors rather than farmers growing sugar crops. The US government also uses tariffs to keep the US domestic price of sugar 64% to 92% higher than the world market price, costing American consumers $3.7 billion per year. A 2018 policy proposal to eliminate sugar tariffs, called "Zero-for-Zero", is currently (March 2018) before the US Congress. Previous reform attempts have failed.

== See also ==
- Criticisms of the sugar industry
- Food industry
- - Sugar industry of the Philippines
- Category:Sugar industry
