= Thai Roong Ruang =

- Industry: Sugar producing
- Founded: 1946
- Founder: Suri Asdathorn
- Headquarters: Thailand

The Thai Roong Ruang Group (TRR Group, Thai: กลุ่มไทยรุ่งเรือง) is Thailand's and Asia's second-largest sugar producer.

The company was founded by Suri Asdathorn in 1946 during a period of post-World War II sugar shortage. The company grew through Suri's successful investments in the rapidly expanding market, as well as his connections in the governments of Plaek Phibunsongkhram and Sarit Thanarat. By 1971, the company's group of factories contributed to 40 percent of the country's sugar production capacity. The company has since branched out into include renewable energy production (from biomass) and warehouse operation via its subsidiary businesses. TRR is currently not listed on the Stock Exchange of Thailand.
