= Indian Institute of Sugarcane Research =

Research center in Lucknow, Uttar Pradesh, India

Indian Sugarcane Research Institute, Lucknow
- Motto in English: An efficient, globally competitive and vibrant sugarcane agriculture
- Type: Registered Society
- Established: 1952
- Administrative staff: 166
- Location: Lucknow, Uttar Pradesh, India; 26°48′14″N 80°56′06″E
- Nickname: IISR
- Website: IISR
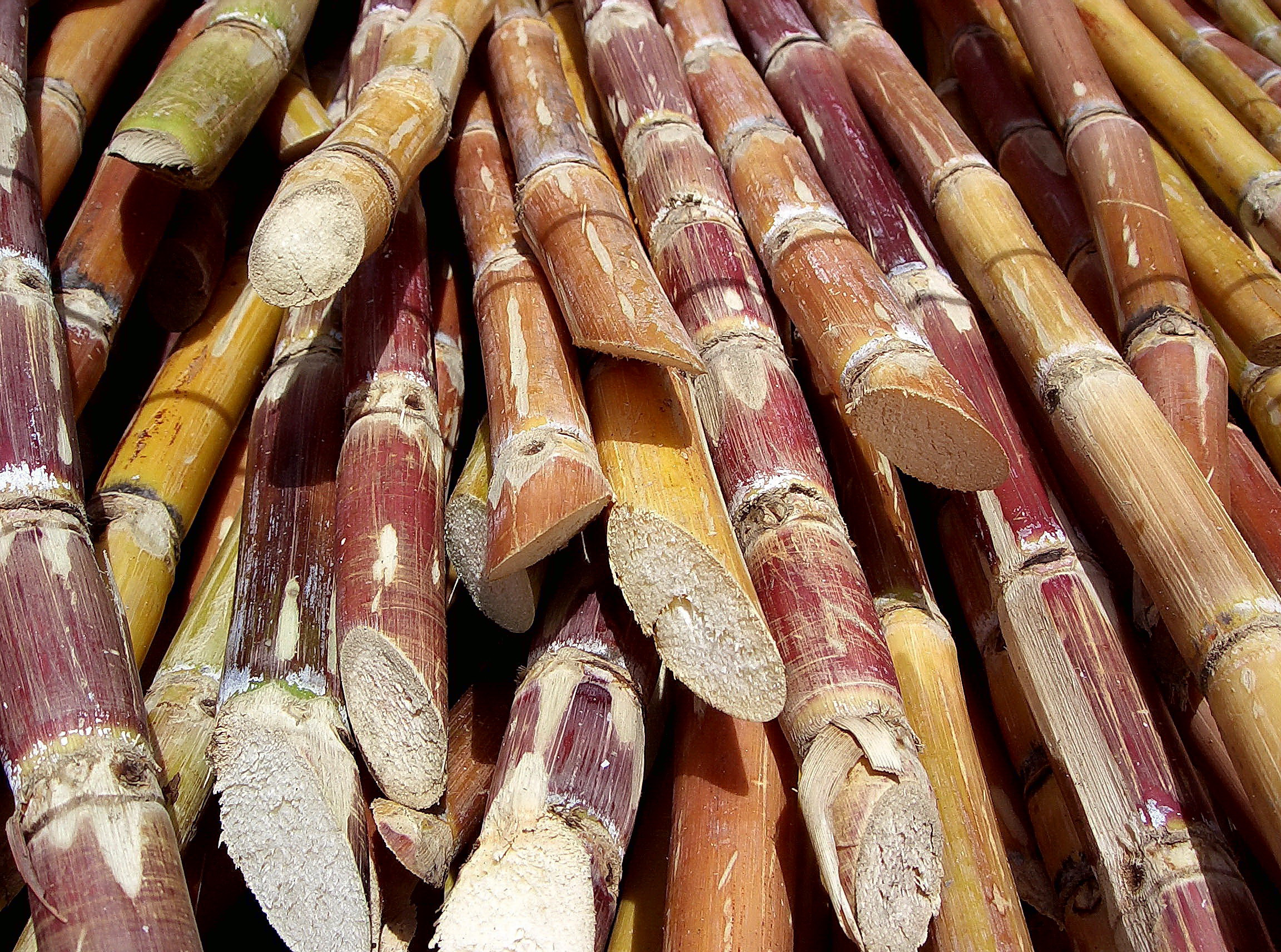

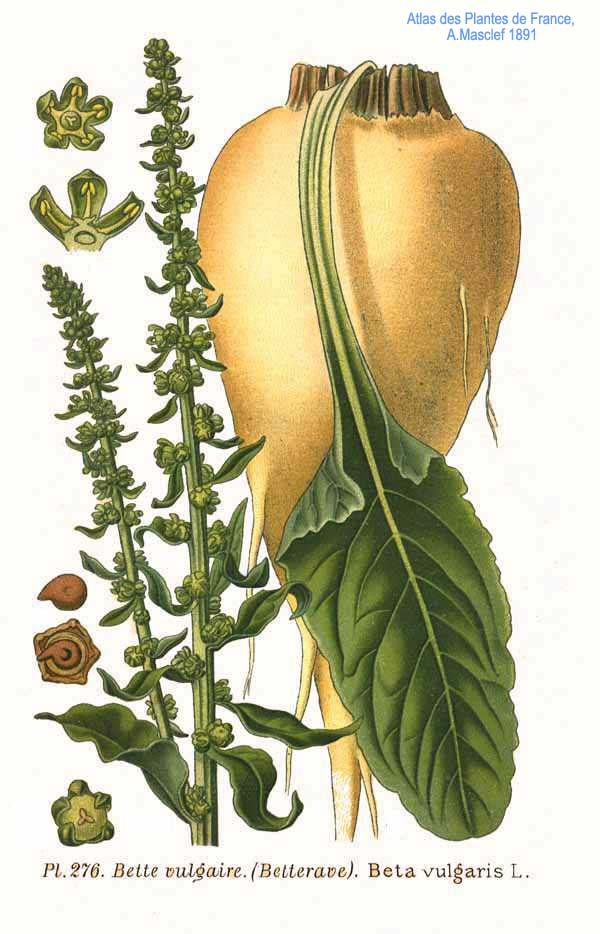
Sugar beet (Beta vulgaris L)

The Indian Institute of Sugarcane Research (acronym: IISR) is an autonomous institute of higher learning, under the umbrella of Indian Council of Agricultural Research (ICAR) by the Ministry of Agriculture, Government of India for advanced research in sugar cane agriculture. The Institute is located on Raibareli Road, Dilkusha (Post Office) in Lucknow, Uttar Pradesh, India. While, The Central Sugarcane Research Institute established in 1912 is located in Coimbatore, Tamil Nadu, India. It works also under the Indian Council of Agricultural Research.

== Profile ==
The Indian Institute of Sugarcane Research (IISR) owes its origin to the recommendations of the erstwhile The Indian Central Sugarcane Committee for advanced research on all aspects of sugarcane cultivation except breeding and coordination of sugarcane researches across the country. The foundation stone of the institute was laid on 16 February 1952 under the administrative control of the Indian Central Sugarcane Committee. It was brought directly under the Government of India on 1 January 1954 and later on it was entrusted to the Indian Council of Agricultural Research (ICAR) on 1 April 1969 along with other agriculture based research institutions.

The Institute is an ISO 9001 accredited agency and has three regional stations for nationwide coverage of its activities.

IISR Regional Centre, Motipur, Muzaffarpur, Bihar: The Centre was the research station of the Sugarcane Breeding Institute, Coimbatore when it was established in 1988 but was brought under IISR on 25 April 2004. The Centre focuses its attention on the development of sugarcane varieties, evaluation of waterlogging tolerance, red rot resistance and mechanization of sugarcane cultivation.

The Centre has developed several varieties of sugarcane for distribution and is involved in breeder seed development of improved varieties.

Sugarbeet Research and Development at the Indian Institute of Sugarcane Research, Lucknow: This Institute is also specialized for sugarbeet, which has wide tolerance levels and is cultivable for extended seasons. IISR has developed various agrotechniques for tropical and subtropical cultivation of sugarbeet, developed mechanized methods of sowing, crop raising and harvesting and standardised seed production technology. The centre also maintains training facilities on maintenance of germplasm, seed production, root crop production, plant protection and region-specific mechanization.

IISR has a Biological Control Centre, at Pravaranagar in Maharashtra.

== Divisions ==
Vision
An efficient, globally competitive and vibrant sugarcane agriculture.
Mission
Enhancement of sugarcane productivity, profitability and sustainability to meet future sugar and energy requirement of India.

Mandate:

The Institute is mandated with the responsibility to:

- conduct basic and applied research on all aspects of production and protection techniques of sugarcane and sugar crops.
- work on breeding of varieties for subtropical region in close collaboration with Sugarcane Breeding Institute, Coimbatore.
- develop linkages with State Agricultural Universities, Research Centres and other organizations for collaborative research, exchange of information and material.
- provide training, consultancy and advisory services to farmers, industries and other users at regional, national and international levels.

=== Division of Crop Improvement ===
The Indian Institute of Sugarcane Research hosted a Botany and Breeding Unit for Sugarcane Breeding Institute, Coimbatore during the sixties and, in 1969, the unit was transferred to IISR. In 1989, the unit was renamed the Division of Crop Improvement.

The Division focusses its attention on advanced research on sugar crops such as sugarcane and sugarbeet and has been successful in developing many improved varieties such as CoLk 8001, CoLk 8102, CoLk 94184 and CoLk 9709, which are known to have high cane yield, sugar content, red rot and top borer resistance and better water logging tolerance. It also produces breeder seed and is also a DUS testing centre of sugarcane.

Mandate: The Division has a set mandate to develop superior sugarcane varieties and breeding and genetic stocks, prescription of biotechnological techniques and documentation and evaluation sugarcane germplasm.

Facilities: The Division is equipped with a Molecular Biology and Biotechnology Lab, a Cytogenetics Lab, a DUS Testing Facility, a Glass house and a Poly house.

=== Division of Crop Production ===
Division of Crop Production, an original division since the inception of IISR 1952, is involved in developing modern technology for sugarcane production in the sub tropical regions. Efforts are on to marry agronomy, soil science and microbiology for improving sugarcane processing including gur and jaggery production.

Major achievements of the Division include ring-pit method of sugarcane planting, skip-furrow method of irrigation, nutrient, water and weed management package in sugarcane production. It looks after the disciplines of Agronomy, Soil Science and Agricultural Chemistry, Agricultural Microbiology and Extension and Training.

=== Division of Crop Protection ===
Cane juice
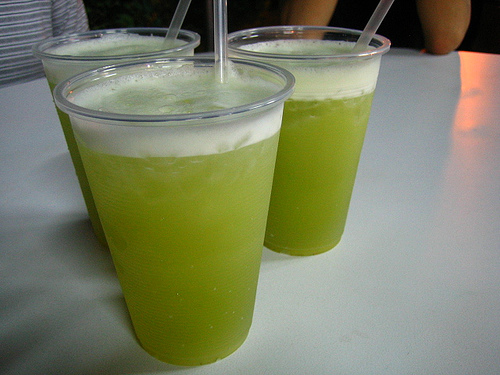
- Freshly squeezed sugarcane juice.

Nutritional value per 28.35 grams
- Energy: 111.13 kJ (26.56 kcal)
- Carbohydrates: 27.51 g
- Sugars: 26.98 g
- Protein: 0.27 g
Vitamins and minerals
Minerals	Quantity %DV^{†}
Calcium	1% 11.23 mg
Iron	2% 0.37 mg
Potassium	1% 41.96 mg
Sodium	1% 17.01 mg
- Nutrient Information from ESHA Research
- ^{†}Percentages estimated using US recommendations for adults, except for potassium, which is estimated based on expert recommendation from the National Academies.

The Institute had four sections, Agronomy, Sugarcane Mycology, Sugarcane Entomology and Agricultural Engineering, when it started in 1952. Four years later, two more sections, Soil Science and Agricultural Chemistry and Plant Physiology, were added. One more section, Botany and Breeding came into existence in 1969. In 2001, two exiting divisions Plant Pathology and Entomology were merged to form the Division of Crop Protection.

The Basic objective of the Division is to conduct advanced research on diseases and pest management of sugarcane and other sugar crops. The Division concentrates on areas such as Plant Pathology with special emphasis on Colletotrichum falcatum, techniques for inducing resistance for sugarcane, use of bio-agents against crop diseases such as yellow leaf virus disease, pragmatic use of chemicals in disease management, variable analysis of pathogens such as Smut, GSD, Mosaic, sugarcane borers, termite and white grub, Entomology and introducing parasitoids in sugarcane agro-ecosystem to combat pests.

=== Division of Physiology and Biochemistry ===
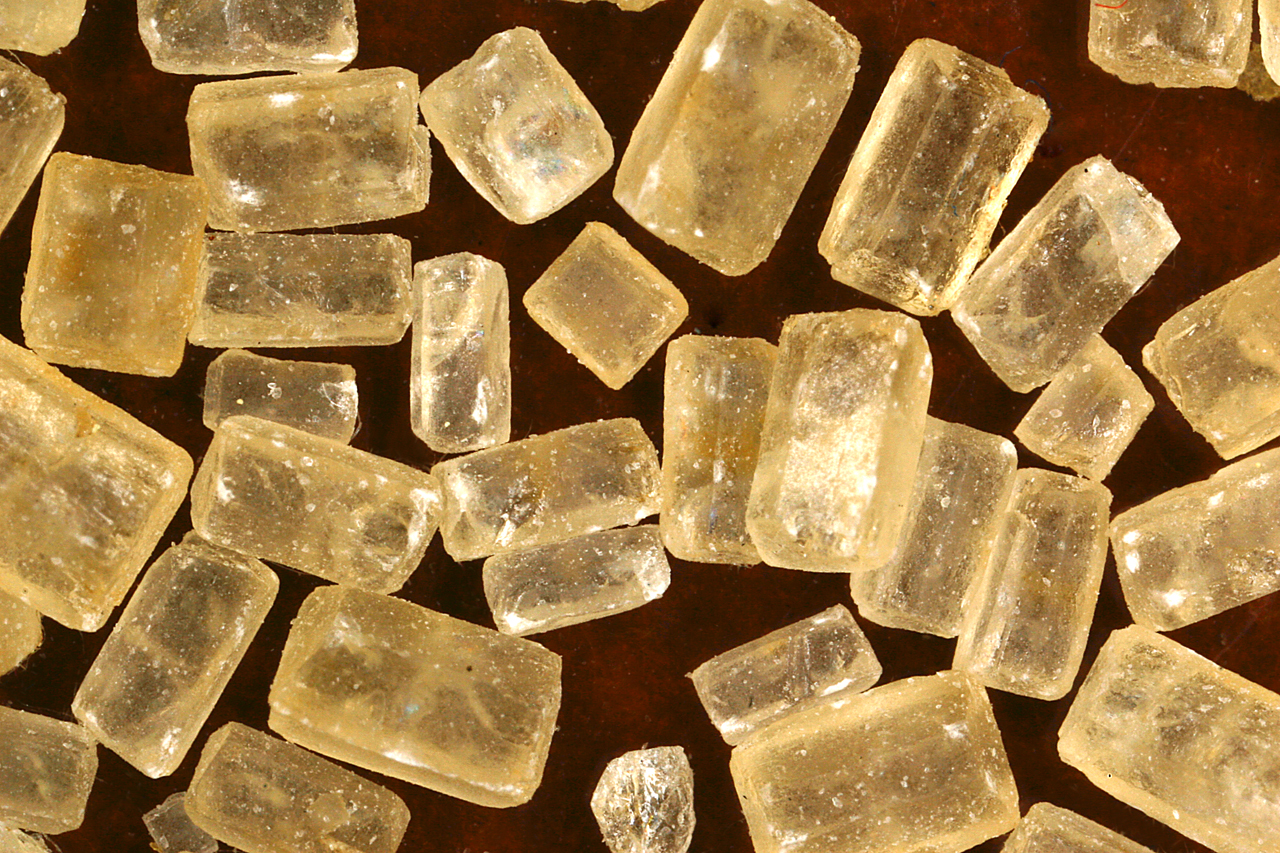
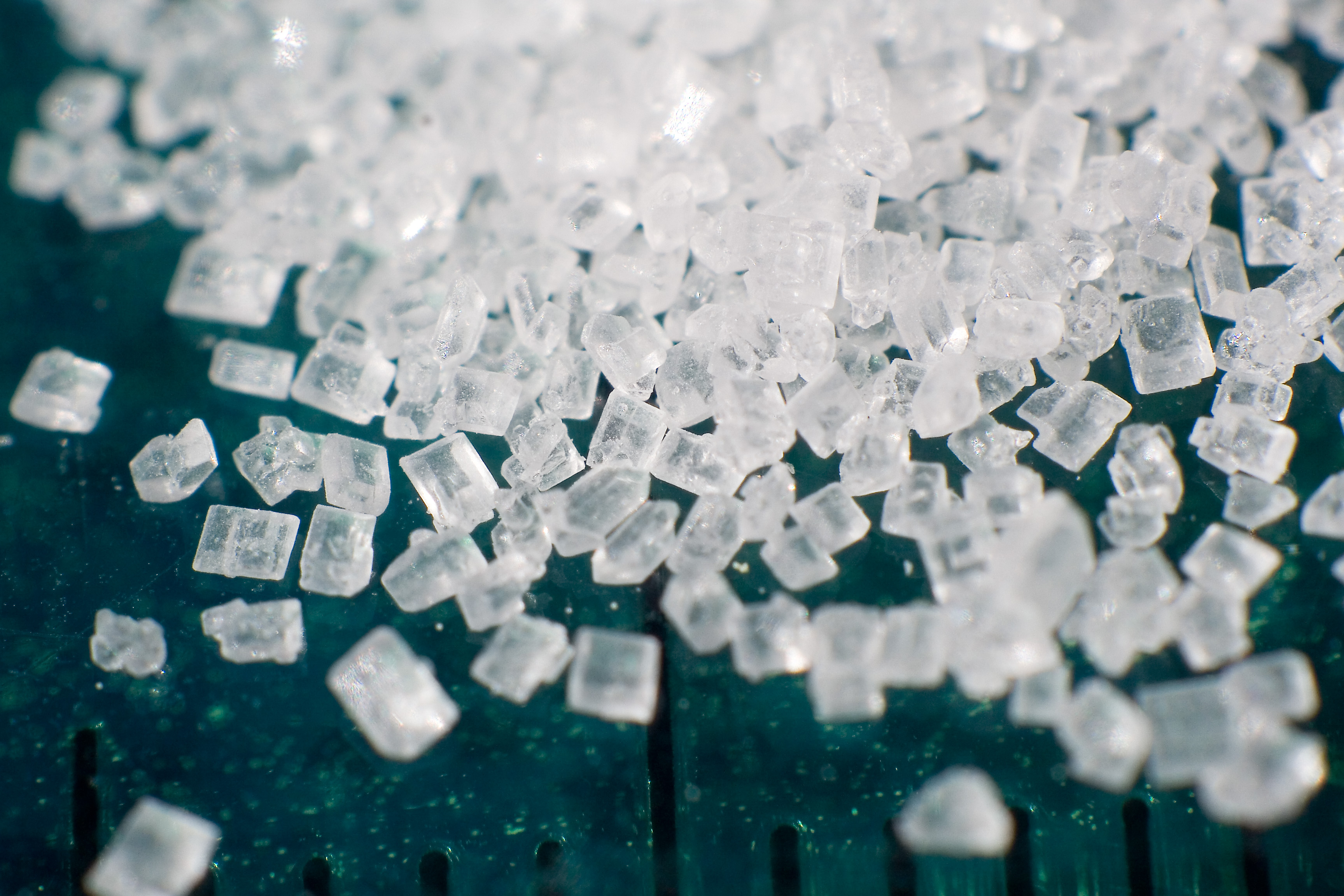
Brown (top) and white sugar crystals.

The Division of Plant Physiology and Biochemistry was originally named Physiology Section started in 1958, but was later elevated to the status of a Division with the new name. The Division attends to the studies on tillering, germination, moisture stress, artificial ripening of crops, seed technology, enhancement of sucrose content, bioethanol production and management of post harvest losses.

=== Division of Agricultural Engineering ===
The Division of Agricultural Engineering evolved out of a small workshop, started in 1952 at the inception of the Institute, for machining and fabrication of tools and equipment and has now grown to be a centre for strategic research on mechanization, water management and post harvest technology of sugarcane and sugar crops. It coordinates with the State Agricultural Universities and other research Centres and provides training, consultancy and advisory services to farmers and other users at national and international levels.

=== Jaggery Unit ===
A video of Sugarcane juice extraction

The Jaggery Unit is the residue of an erstwhile All India Co-ordinated Research Project (AICRP) on Processing, Handling and Storage of Jaggery and Khandsari sugar when the Project was moved to CIPHET Ludhiana, leaving the research on jaggery stayed back at IISR. The Unit is a platform for research on improving technology of sugarcane processing for juice, jaggery and value added products. The main aim is to develop cost, energy efficient ways to produce and store jaggery. The Unit is equipped with:

Facility	Equipment	Equipment
vertical and horizontal crushers	Vacuum oven	Mechanical jaggery drier
Furnace house	Texture analyzer	Band sealer with nitrogen flushing
Jaggery drying-cum-storage warehouse	Hot air oven	Digital refractometer
Laboratory crushers	Bomb calorimeter	Dehumidifier
Environment control chamber	Anemometer	Refrigerator
Juice sampling facility	Colour meter	pH meter
Land for growing vegetative clarificants		Shrink wrapping machine

=== Farm Section ===
IISR maintains a farm, with an extent of 186.50 hectares out of which 125.15 hectares is under research cultivation and is equipped with 13 tube wells and farm equipment including 7 tractors. The Farm produces high quality sugarcane seeds and other produces such as wheat, paddy, mustard and gram. It also sells produces such as Sugarcane, Wheat, Paddy, Gram, Mustard, Cane juice, Bael, Awanla and Mango commercially for revenue generation. Through its activities, the Farm Unit helps IISR research on field experimentation.

=== Research Coordination and Management Unit ===
RCM Unit is the documentation hub of IISR and maintains a database of research projects and project documentation and reports to ICAR as prescribed. The Unit is also responsible for the dissemination of information and the preparation of annual reports, newsletters, technical bulletins and brochures.

== Facilities ==
=== Soil, Water and Plant Sample Analysis Facility ===
This is a microbiological laboratory facility for analysis of soil, water and plant samples. It is open to the Institute and outside users have to pay for the services.

=== Juice Quality Control Laboratory ===
The JQC laboratory is equipped with Auto-Pol 800 and Rapi-Pol extractor for sugarcane and sugarbeet juice quality analysis to check oBrix, pol% juice, purity quotient, reducing sugars, dextran content and fibre content.

=== Agrometeorology Laboratory ===
The laboratory was originally a part of the Division of Soil Science and Agricultural Chemistry when it started in 1992 but, two years later, it was given independent status and the met yard was also merged with it. It assesses the weather fluctuations and climatic changes and analyses their impact on sugarcane production and quality.

=== Library ===
IISR Library is a well stocked one with a collection of 10143 books, 390 periodicals, 18,000 volumes along with research journals, annual reports, these and monographs, some of them rare, on sugarcane and related topics. It also maintains a digital library and the users also have access to journals on CeRA web site.

== All India Coordinated Project for Research ==
Mandate:

The project is mandated with the responsibility to:

- Evaluate locally adapted sugarcane varieties with improved yield and quality as well as resistance to biotic and abiotic stresses.
- Develop a package of practices for higher cane sugar production.
- Develop low cost technologies for sugarcane production.
- Intensify and extend the networking facility and information generation for transfer of technology to the farmers and sugar industry.

Objectives:

The main objectives of the project are:

- To coordinate multilocation testing of germplasm and advance breeding materials for evaluating appropriate region/location specific improved varieties.
- To organize and conduct strategic and applied research of inter-disciplinary nature for evolving appropriate region/location specific package of practices for crop production.
- To develop region or location specific strategies for integrated disease and pest management.

Enhancement and maintenance of disease free nucleus seed material for distribution to the cooperating organizations.

- To disseminate generated information and technology.

Coordinated research activity started in India in 1929 when the then Imperial Council of Agricultural Research, forerunner of the present Indian Council of Agricultural Research, recommended study on sugarcane and sugar industry. In 1971, ICAR set up an All India Coordinated Project for Research (AICRP) on sugarcane with IISR as the base.

Efforts at the All India Coordinated Project for Research on sugarcane is dedicated to the sugarcane cultivation in different parts of the country where the agro-climatic conditions differ from region to region. The project provides a strong infrastructure for the research activities through its various research centres at the Indian Council of Agricultural Research institutes, State Agricultural universities, State Departments of Agriculture and Non Government Organizations, spread all over the country.

== Agricultural Knowledge Management Unit ==
In 1995, IISR started an Agriculture Research Information System section under the National Agricultural Technology Project for augmenting the communication facilities of the Institute. In 2011, the section was renamed as Agricultural Knowledge Management Unit.

Over the years, the section equipped the Institute with modern computing and communication infrastructure consisting of a network of 200 nodes and 120 computers, a Local Area Network based on optical fibre cabling, a series of servers such as Web Server, Mail Exchange, Internet Proxy and Application Server, 100 Mbit/s leased line and connectivity with National Knowledge Network project of Government of India, as a nodal centre.

AKMU is active in the research on designing and sampling sugarcane experiments, performance, production constraints and price policies of sugarcane cropping, statistical support to the scientists, in-house development of required computer software, network and system administration, MIS, gathering market intelligence and other activities related to the dynamics of sugarcane and sugar production.

== Krishi Vigyan Kendra ==
The Krishi Vigyan Kendra is an ICAR initiative for efforts to assist the farming community for the betterment of agricultural production and overall socio economic development of the community. Several KVK centres are functioning with their bases at various ICAR institutes and the KVK in IISR was established in 1999. The centre was formed with an aim to serve the farming community by delivering demand driven services with the assistance of qualified professionals. It was set with a mandate to assess, refine, demonstrate and introduce modern technologies and products to the farming community. The centre hosts a Vermicompost Unit, Bee keeping facility, a Technology Park, a Pashu Chokolate Production Unit and a Nutritional Kitchen Garden.

The major achievements of the KVK is listed by IISR as:

- Introduction of tissue culture banana.
- Propagation of intercropping techniques for vegetables under banana cultivation.
- Large scale sowing of wheat with the assistance of machinery.
- Introduction of intercropping of wheat and rice
- Propagation of improved variety of oilseeds and pulses crops
- Techniques for potato processing at farmers' fields.
- Nutritional kitchen garden at farmer's field.
- Fruit fly management in mango crop.
- Popularization of the production of value added products such as making pickles, murabba, squash, candy, chutney, sauce, chips, french fries etc.
- Use of sugarbeet as a fodder crop.
- Introduction of several hybrid varieties of paddy.
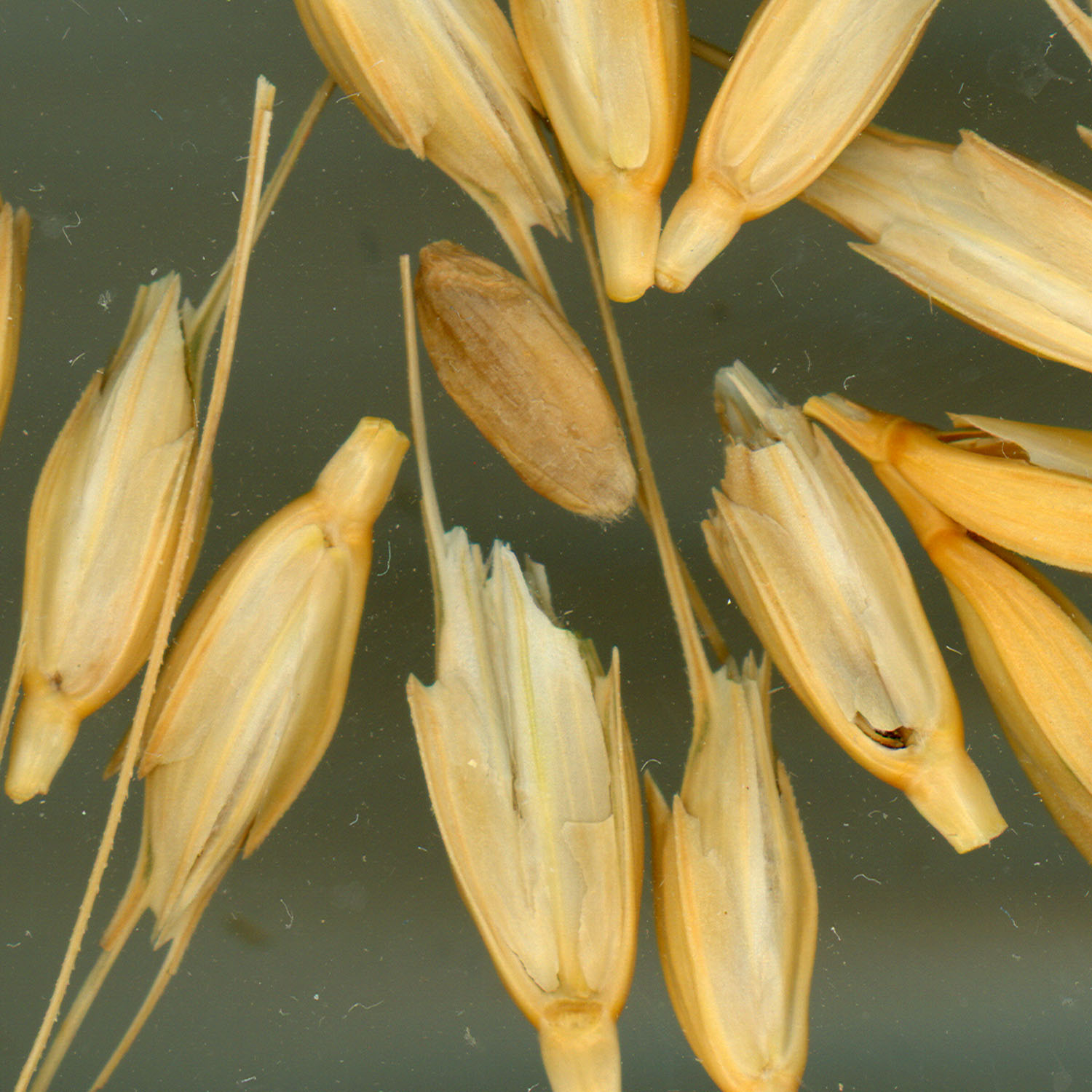
Triticum monococcum spikelets

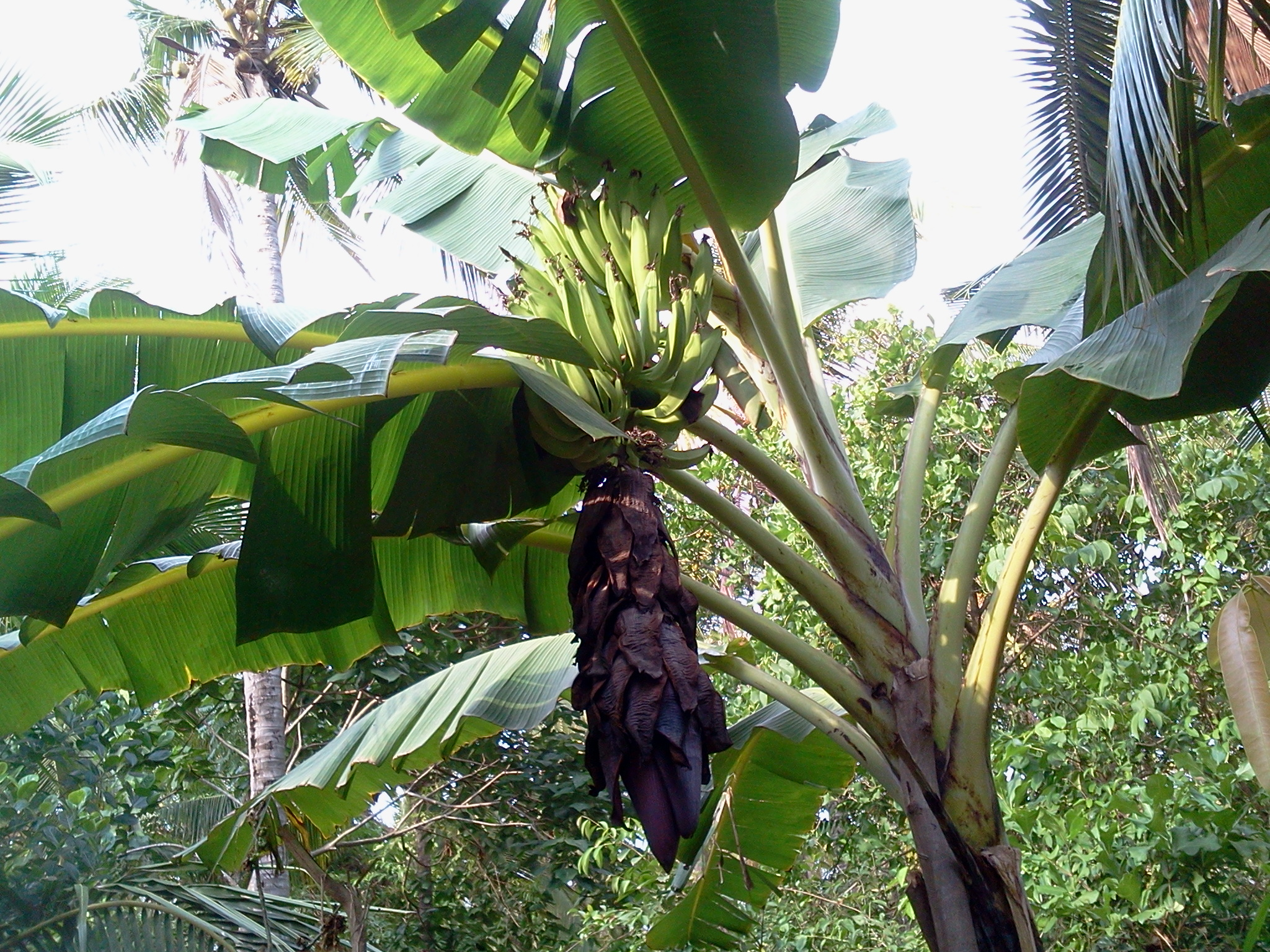
Nendran banana

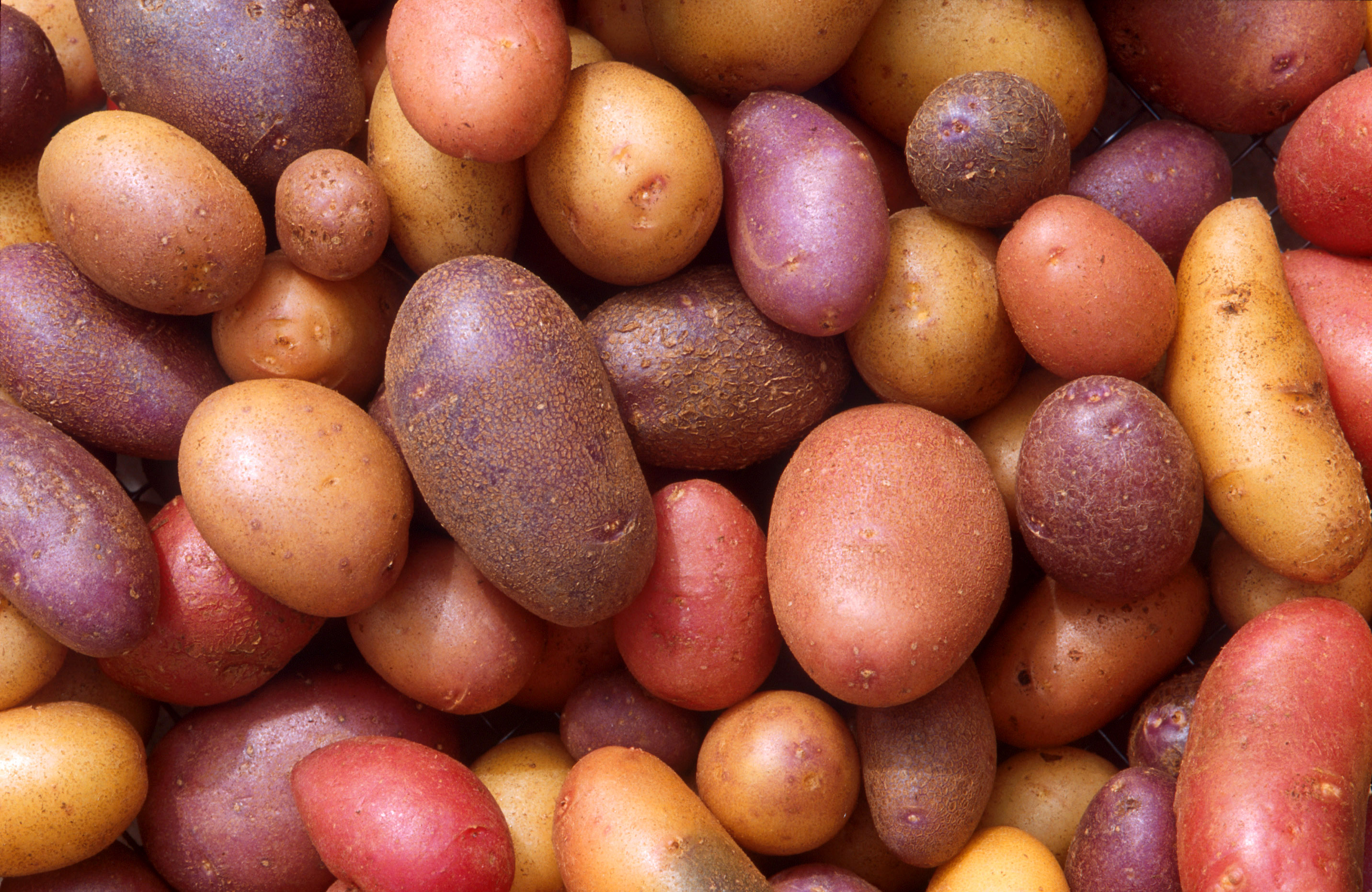
Different potato varieties

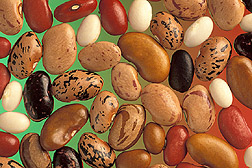
Phaseolus vulgaris seeds

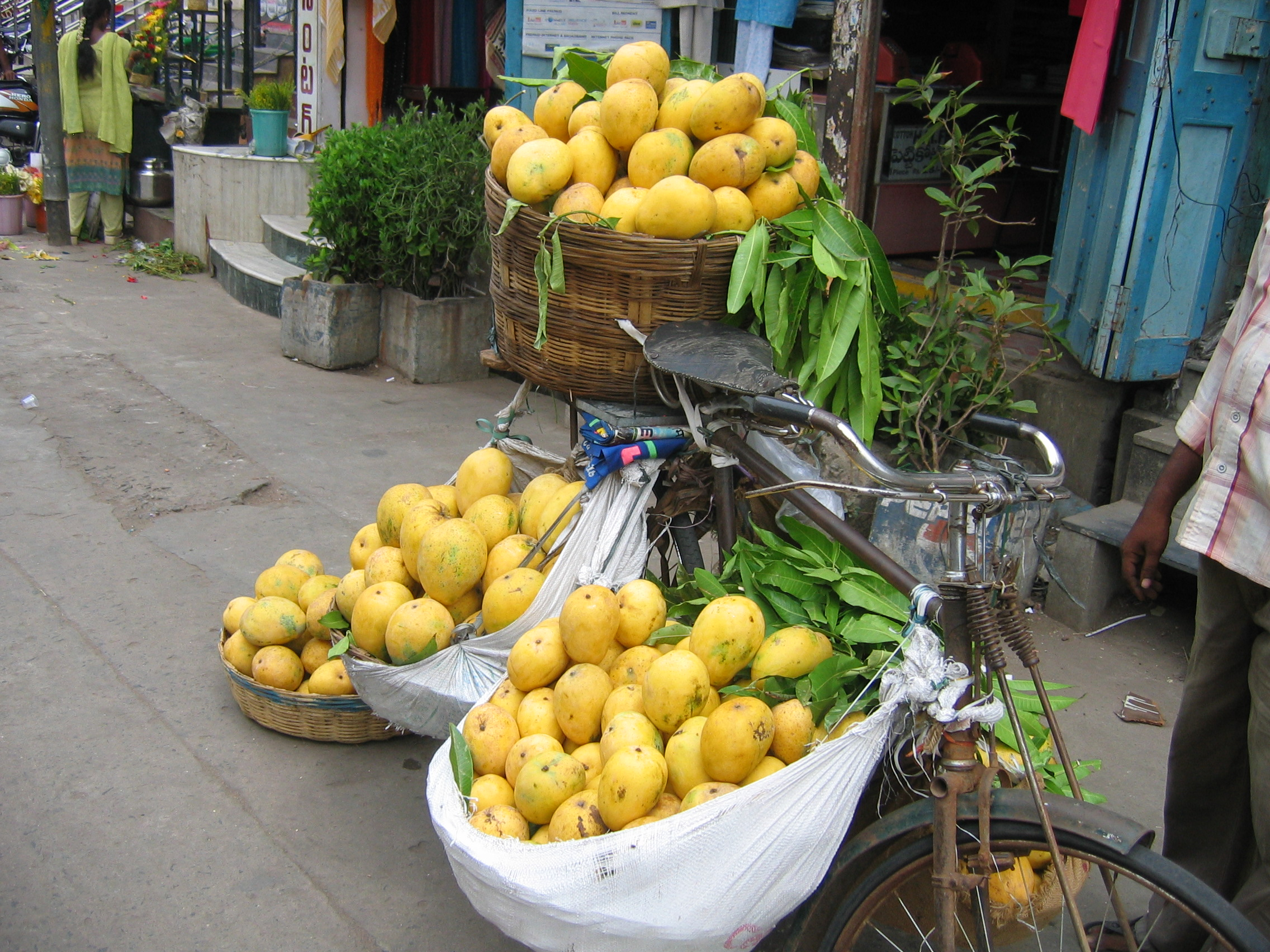
Banganpalli mangoes

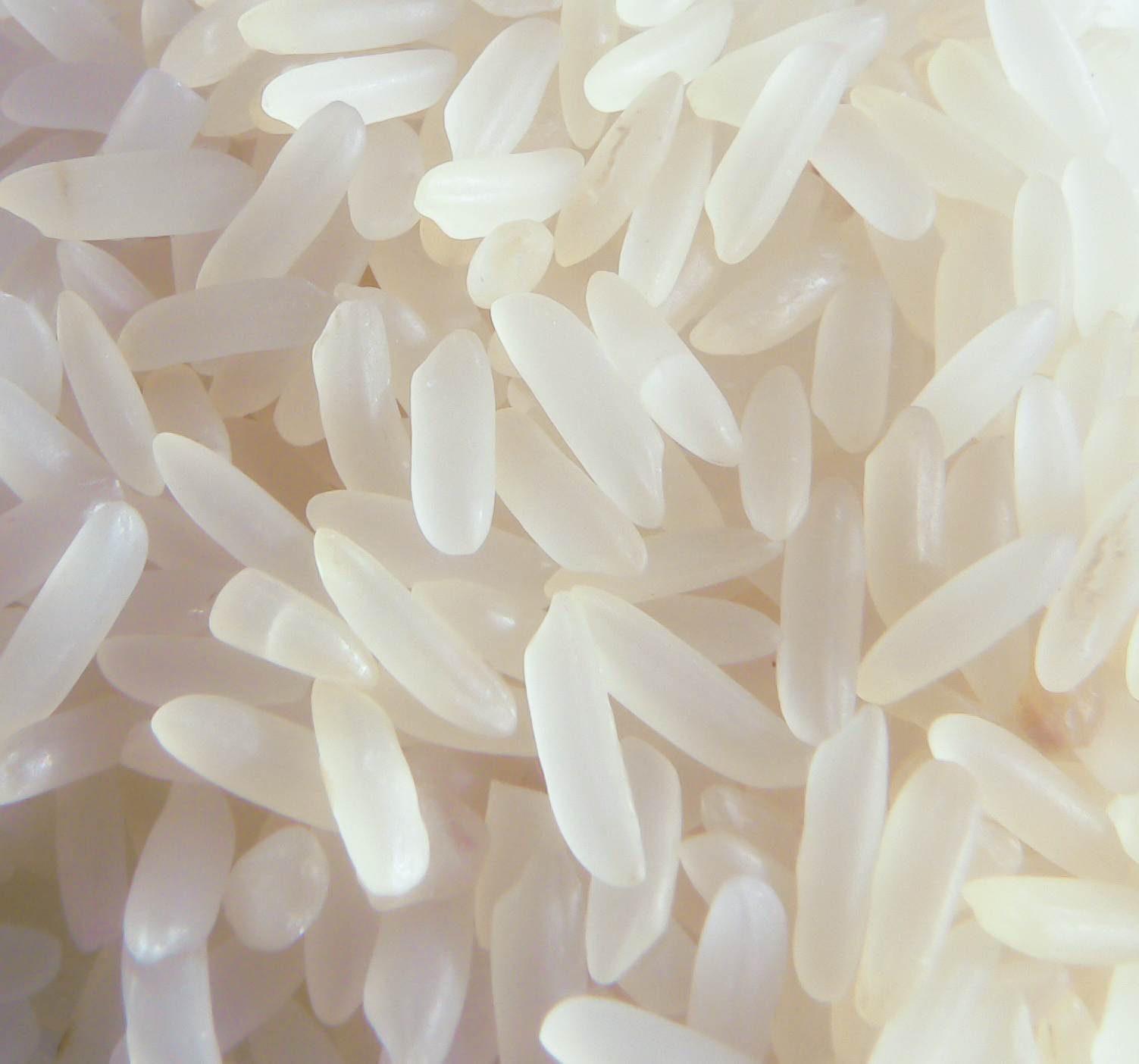
Pre-steamed long rice

== Publications ==
IISR has brought out several publications of which some of the notable ones are:

- V. K. Madan; S. R. Misra; Namita Soni; S. Solomon. Manual for Sugar analysis. Indian Institute of Sugarcane Research.
- A. K. Srivastava; B. L. Srivastava; V. K. Madan. Pre-milling Sugar and their Management in sugarcane. Indian Institute of Sugarcane Research.
- A. K. Srivastava; H. N. Shahi; S. Solomon; Jagdish Lal; N. Kulshrestha. Sugar Production in 21st century, exploring potential of high sugar early ripening varieties. Indian Institute of Sugarcane Research.
- H. N. Shahi; A. K. Srivastava; O. K. Sinha. 50 years of sugarcane research in India - 2000. Indian Institute of Sugarcane Research.
- R. L. Yadav; D. V. Yadav; R. P. Verma. Cane management & development in Sugar Mills Reserved Zone. Indian Institute of Sugarcane Research.
- S. K. Duttamajumder. Red Rot of Sugarcane. Indian Institute of Sugarcane Research.

== See also ==
- Agroecological restoration
- Agroecosystem
- Agroecosystem analysis
- Ecology
- Organic agriculture
