= List of institutions of higher education in Uttar Pradesh =

This is an incomplete list of institutions of higher education in the Uttar Pradesh, India.

== Universities ==
Uttar Pradesh has a total of 84 universities, the second-highest of all Indian states and territories.

Summary
TYPE	Number
Central	6
State	45
Private	49
Deemed	8
Total	84

=== Central ===
Uttar Pradesh has 6 central universities.

University	Location	Established	University status	Enrolled students (as of 2014)	References
Aligarh Muslim University	Aligarh	1875 (Note: Established as Mohammedan Angelo-Oriental College.)	1920	20791	
Babasaheb Bhimrao Ambedkar University	Lucknow	1996	1996	1770	
Banaras Hindu University	Varanasi	1916	1916	30698	
Rajiv Gandhi National Aviation University	Raebareli	2013	2013	N/A	
Rani Lakshmi Bai Central Agricultural University	Jhansi	2014	2014		
University of Allahabad	Prayagraj	1876	1887	22615	

There are 45 state universities in Uttar Pradesh:

University	Location	Established	References
Sampurnanand Sanskrit Vishwavidyalaya	Varanasi	1791 (1958^{†})	
University of Lucknow	Lucknow	1864 (1920^{†})	
King George's Medical University	Lucknow	1905 (2002^{†})	
Harcourt Butler Technical University	Kanpur	1921 (2016^{†})	
Mahatma Gandhi Kashi Vidyapith	Varanasi	1921 (2009^{†})	
Bhatkhande Sanskriti Vishwavidyalaya	Lucknow	1926 (2022^{†})	
Dr. Bhimrao Ambedkar University	Agra	1927	
U.P. Pt. Deen Dayal Upadhyaya Veterinary Science University and Cattle Research Institute	Mathura	1947 (2001^{†})	
Deen Dayal Upadhyay Gorakhpur University	Gorakhpur	1957	
Madan Mohan Malaviya University of Technology	Gorakhpur	1962 (2013^{†})	
Chaudhary Charan Singh University	Meerut	1965	
Chhatrapati Shahu Ji Maharaj University	Kanpur	1966	
Chandra Shekhar Azad University of Agriculture and Technology	Kanpur	1974	
Acharya Narendra Deva University of Agriculture and Technology	Faizabad	1975	
Bundelkhand University	Jhansi	1975	
Dr. Ram Manohar Lohia Avadh University	Faizabad	1975	
Mahatma Jyotiba Phule Rohilkhand University	Bareilly	1975	
Veer Bahadur Singh Purvanchal University	Jaunpur	1987	
Uttar Pradesh Rajarshi Tandon Open University	Prayagraj	1999	
Maa Shakumbhari University	Saharanpur	1999 (2021^{†})	
Sardar Vallabhbhai Patel University of Agriculture and Technology	Meerut	2000	
Dr. A. P. J. Abdul Kalam Technical University	Lucknow	2001	
Gautam Buddha University	Gautam Buddha Nagar	2002	
Uttar Pradesh University of Medical Sciences	Saifai, Etawah	2005 (2016^{†})	
Dr. Ram Manohar Lohiya National Law University	Lucknow	2005	
Dr. Ram Manohar Lohia Institute of Medical Sciences	Lucknow	2006 (2018^{†})	
Dr. Shakuntala Misra National Rehabilitation University	Lucknow	2008	
Banda University of Agriculture and Technology	Banda	2010	
Khwaja Moinuddin Chishti Language University	Lucknow	2010	
Siddharth University	Siddharthnagar	2015	
Jananayak Chandrashekhar University	Ballia	2016	
Allahabad State University	Prayagraj	2016	
Atal Bihari Vajpayee Medical University	Lucknow	2020	
Raja Mahendra Pratap Singh State University	Aligarh	2021	
Maa Pateswari University	Balrampur	2024	
Maa Vindhyavasini University	Mirzapur	2024	
Guru Jambheshwar University	Moradabad	2024	
Kashi Naresh University	Bhadohi	2026	
Jagadguru Rambhadracharya Divyang State University	Chitrakoot	2023	
Major Dhyanchand Sports University	Meerut	2022	
Swami Shukdevanand University,	Shahjahanpur	2025	
Dr. Rajendra Prasad National Law University	Prayagraj	2020	
Mahayogi Guru Gorakhnath AYUSH University	Gorakhpur	2020	
Mahatma Buddha Agriculture and Technology University	Kushinagar	2026	
Uttar Pradesh Forestry and Horticulture University	Gorakhpur	2027	

^{†} granted university status

=== Private ===
There are 37 private universities in Uttar Pradesh:

University	Location	Established	References
Amity University	Noida	2005	
Babu Banarasi Das University	Lucknow	2010	
Bareilly International University	Bareilly	2016	
Bennett University	Greater Noida	2016	
Chandigarh University, Unnao	Unnao	2024	
Era University	Lucknow	2016	
F.S. University	Shikohabad	2021	
GLA University	Mathura	2010	
Galgotias University	Greater Noida	2011	
IFTM University	Moradabad	2010	
IILM University Greater Noida	Greater Noida		
IIMT University	Meerut	2016	
Integral University	Lucknow	2004	
Invertis University	Bareilly	2010	
J.S. University	Shikohabad	2015	
Jagadguru Rambhadracharya Divyanga University	Chitrakoot	2001	
Jaypee University, Anoopshahr	Anupshahr	2014	
K.M. (Krishna Mohan) University	Mathura		
Maharishi University of Information Technology	Lucknow		
Mahayogi Gorakhnath University	Gorakhpur	2021	
Major S. D. Singh University	Fatehgarh		
Mangalayatan University	Aligarh	2006	
Mohammad Ali Jauhar University	Rampur	2006	
Monad University	Hapur	2010	
Noida International University	Greater Noida	2010	
Rama University	Faizabad	2002	
Sanskriti University	Mathura	2016	
SDGI Global University	Ghaziabad		
Sharda University	Greater Noida	2009	
Shobhit University	Gangoh	2012	
Shri Ramswaroop Memorial University	Barabanki	2012	
Shri Venkateshwara University	Gajraula	2010	
Swami Vivekanand Subharti University	Meerut	2008	
Teerthanker Mahaveer University	Moradabad	2008	
Glocal University	Saharanpur	2012	
United University	Prayagraj		
Shiv Nadar University	Greater Noida		

=== Deemed ===
The following 8 institutions have been declared as deemed universities under section 3 of the UGC Act, 1956, by the Ministry of Human Resource Development:

University	Location	Established	References
Central Institute of Higher Tibetan Studies	Varanasi	1967	
Dayalbagh Educational Institute	Agra	1917	
Indian Veterinary Research Institute	Bareilly	1889	
Jaypee Institute of Information Technology^{#}	Noida	2001	
Nehru Gram Bharati^{#}	Prayagraj	1962	
Sam Higginbottom University of Agriculture, Technology and Sciences	Prayagraj	1910	
Santosh Medical College	Ghaziabad	1995	
Shobhit Institute of Engineering & Technology	Meerut	2006	

^{#} Recognition status sub judice in the Supreme Court.

== Research institutions ==
- Indian Institute of Sugarcane Research, Lucknow
- Central Drug Research Institute, Lucknow
- Central Institute of Medicinal and Aromatic Plants
- Centre for Development of Advanced Computing, Noida
- Govind Ballabh Pant Social Science Institute, Allahabad
- Harish-Chandra Research Institute, Allahabad
- Indian Institute of Pulses Research, Kanpur
- Industrial Toxicology Research Centre, Lucknow
- National Botanical Research Institute
- National Bureau of Fish Genetic Resources, Lucknow
- National Sugar Institute, Kanpur
- Uttar Pradesh Textile Technology Institute, Kanpur

== Autonomous institutes ==
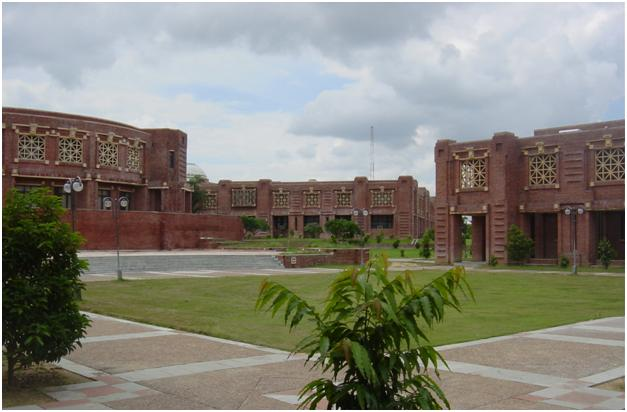
IIM Lucknow

There are 12 autonomous institutions of higher education in Uttar Pradesh:

- Indian Institute of Management Lucknow: the fourth IIM to be established in India
- Indian Institute of Information Technology, Allahabad: a premier institute in computer science and allied areas and a Deemed university
- Indian Institute of Information Technology, Lucknow: one of Indian Institute of Information Technology which are funded by PPP, a Deemed university
- IIT Kanpur: one of the sixteen Indian Institutes of Technology and Institute of National Importance
- IIT (BHU) Varanasi: one of the sixteen Indian Institutes of Technology and Institute of National Importance
- All India Institute of Medical Sciences, Gorakhpur: one of the 24 All India Institute of Medical Sciences and Institute of National Importance.
- All India Institute of Medical Sciences, Raebareli: one of the 24 All India Institute of Medical Sciences and Institute of National Importance.
- Motilal Nehru National Institute of Technology: one of the 20 National Institutes of Technology and Institute of National Importance
- National Institute of Fashion Technology, Raebareli
- National Institute of Fashion Technology, Varanasi
- National Forensic Science University, Varanasi
- National School of Drama, Varanasi
- Sanjay Gandhi Postgraduate Institute of Medical Sciences, Lucknow: one of the five Institute under State Legislature Act
- Dr. Ram Manohar Lohia Institute of Medical Sciences, Lucknow
- Rajiv Gandhi Institute of Petroleum Technology, Raebareli, and Institute of National Importance
- Udai Pratap Autonomous College: situated in Varanasi and it is being converted to State University.

== Colleges ==
=== Engineering and management ===
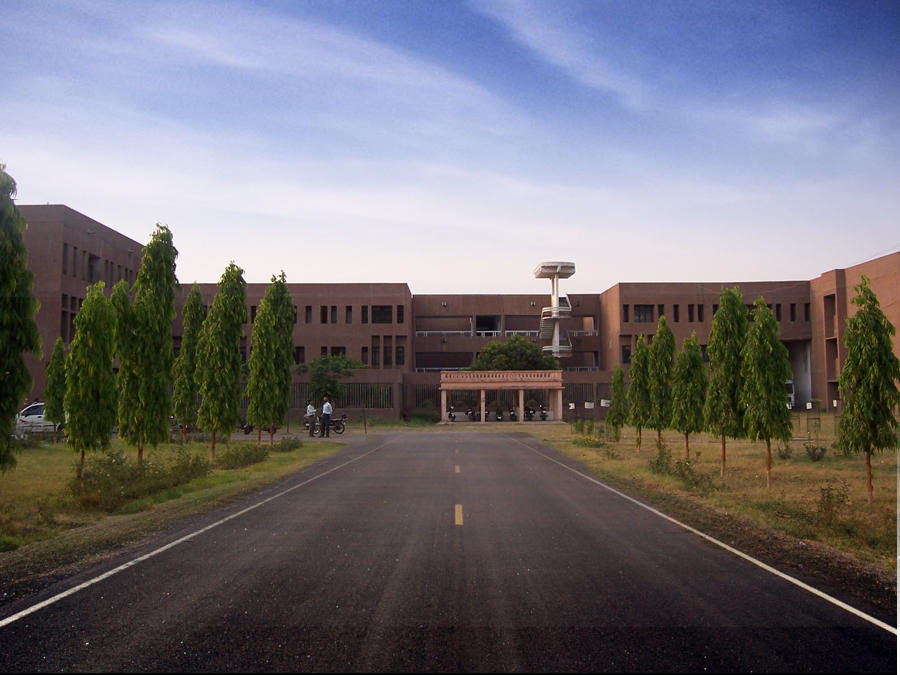
IET Lucknow

- Dr. Gaur Hari Singhania Institute of Management and Research, Kanpur Uttar Pradesh
- College of Computing Sciences & IT (CCSIT), Moradabad
- Teerthanker Mahaveer University, Moradabad
- Institute of Engineering and Technology, Lucknow
- Bundelkhand Institute of Engineering and Technology, Jhansi
- Noida Institute of Engineering and Technology, Greater Noida
- Devprayag Institute of Technical Studies, Allahabad
- Institute of Management Technology, Ghaziabad
- R.D. Engineering College Ghaziabad
- University Institute of Engineering and Technology, Kanpur
- Mangalayatan University , Aligarh

=== Medicine ===
- All India Institute of Medical Sciences, Gorakhpur
- Baba Raghav Das Medical College, Gorakhpur
- Integral Institute of Medical Sciences & Research, Lucknow
- Government Medical College, Faizabad
- Government Medical College, Jalaun
- Dr. Bhimrao Ramji Ambedkar Government Medical College, Kannauj
- Institute of Medical Sciences, Banaras Hindu University
- Ganesh Shankar Vidyarthi Memorial Medical College, Kanpur
- Government Medical College and Super Facility Hospital, Azamgarh
- Jawaharlal Nehru Medical College, Aligarh
- King George's Medical University, Lucknow
- KMC Medical College & Hospital, Maharajganj
- Lala Lajpat Rai Memorial Medical College, Meerut
- Mahamaya Medical College, Akbarpur
- Maharani Laxmi Bai Medical College, Jhansi
- Maharshi Vashishtha Autonomous State Medical College and OPEC Hospital, Basti
- Motilal Nehru Medical College, Prayagraj
- Sanjay Gandhi Postgraduate Institute of Medical Sciences, Lucknow
- Sarojini Naidu Medical College, Agra
- Teerthanker Mahaveer University, Moradabad
- Uttar Pradesh University of Medical Sciences, Saifai, Etawah
- Mangalayatan University , Aligarh

=== General ===
- Avadh Girls' Degree College, Lucknow
- Agra College, Agra
- Teerthanker Mahaveer Medical College & Research Centre, Moradabad
- Akbarpur Degree College Akbarpur, Kanpur Dehat
- Bareilly College, Bareilly
- Brahmanand College Kanpur
- Chaudhary Charan Singh Post Graduate College, Saifai
- Christ Church College, Kanpur
- DAV College, Kanpur
- D.A.V. College, Lucknow
- DAV Post Graduate College Varanasi
- Durgadutta Chunnilal Sagar Mal Post Graduate College, Mau
- Ewing Christian College
- Gandhi Faiz-E-Aam College, Shahjahanpur
- Halim Muslim PG College
- Hindu College, Moradabad
- Institute of Social Sciences, Agra
- Kedar Nath Girdharilal Khatri PG College Moradabad
- Lucknow Christian College
- Meerut College
- National P. G. College, Lucknow
- Post Graduate College, Ghazipur
- Pandit Prithi Nath College Kanpur
- Ramabai Government Women Post Graduate College, Akbarpur, Ambedkar Nagar district
- Shibli National College
- SLJB PG College, Rajesultanpur
- SP Memorial Institute of Technology, Prayagraj
- St. John's College, Agra
- Vikramajit Singh Sanatan Dharma College
- WLC College India
- Shia College, Lucknow
- Sri Jai Narain Misra PG College, Lucknow
- Mangalayatan University , Aligarh

=== Others ===
- Asian Academy of Film & Television, Noida
- Teerthanker Mahaveer University, Moradabad
- Bharatendu Academy of Dramatic Arts
- Footwear Design and Development Institute
- Institute Of Dental Sciences Bareilly
- International Maritime Institute (IMI), Greater Noida
- Lloyd Law College
- Faculty of Fine Arts, University of Lucknow
- Railway Protection Force Academy
- Veterinary College, Mathura

== Madrasas ==
- Darul Uloom Deoband
- Darul Uloom Nadwatul Ulama, Lucknow
- Darul Uloom Waqf Deoband
- Mazahir Uloom

== See also ==
- Education in India
- Education in Uttar Pradesh
- List of engineering colleges in Kanpur
- List of educational institutions in Lucknow
- List of educational institutions in Meerut
