= JAIS =

JAIS may refer to:

- Journal of Arabic and Islamic Studies
- Journal of the Association for Information Systems
- Jerusalem American International School
- Jais, Amethi, a town in India
- Jais (language model), a large language model
- Jebel Jais, a mountain in the United Arab Emirates

== See also ==
- Jaiswal (disambiguation), topographic surname from Jais, India
- Jaisi, topographic surname from Jais, India
