= Jaiswal =

Jaiswal or Jayswal or Jayaswal may refer to one of several communities in India which originate from Jais in Uttar Pradesh, India:

- Jaiswal (surname)
- Jaiswal Brahmin
- Jaiswal Jain

== See also ==
- JAIS (disambiguation)
- Jaisi, another surname from Jais
