= IIMT University =

Private university in Uttar Pradesh, India

Coordinates: 28.9992°N 77.7612°E

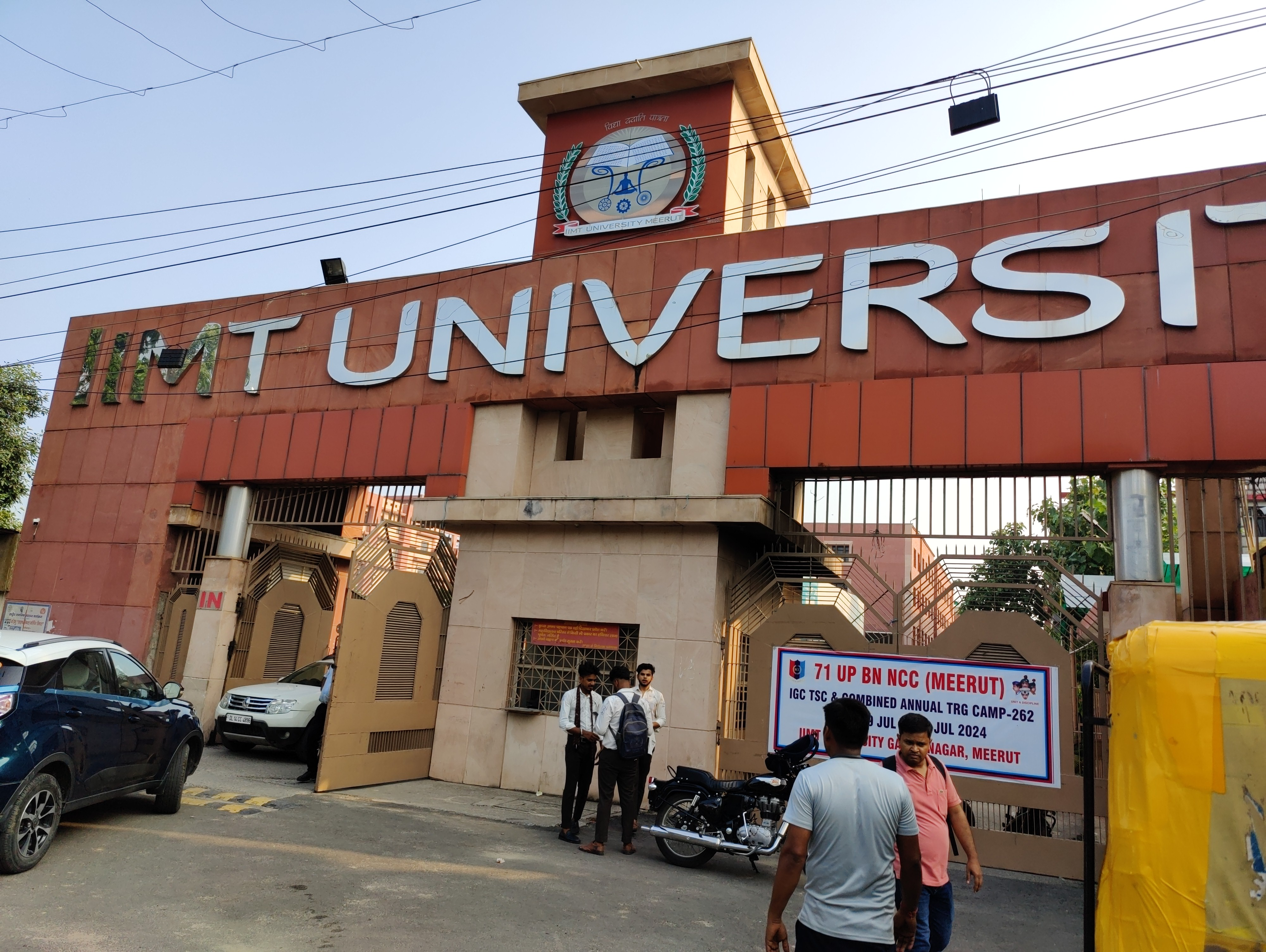
- Main campus entrance
- Type: Private university
- Established: 2016
- Accreditation: NAAC 'A' Grade
- Affiliations: UGC Sections 2(f) & 12B
- Chancellor: Yogesh Mohanji Gupta
- Location: Ganga Nagar, Meerut, Uttar Pradesh, India
- Campus: 100 acres (40 ha); Urban
- Website: iimtu.edu.in

IIMT University is a private university in Meerut, Uttar Pradesh, India, established in 2016 under Uttar Pradesh Act No. 32. It is accredited with an 'A' grade by the National Assessment and Accreditation Council and recognised by the University Grants Commission under Sections 2(f) and 12B. Its main campus is situated in the Ganga Nagar neighborhood of Meerut.

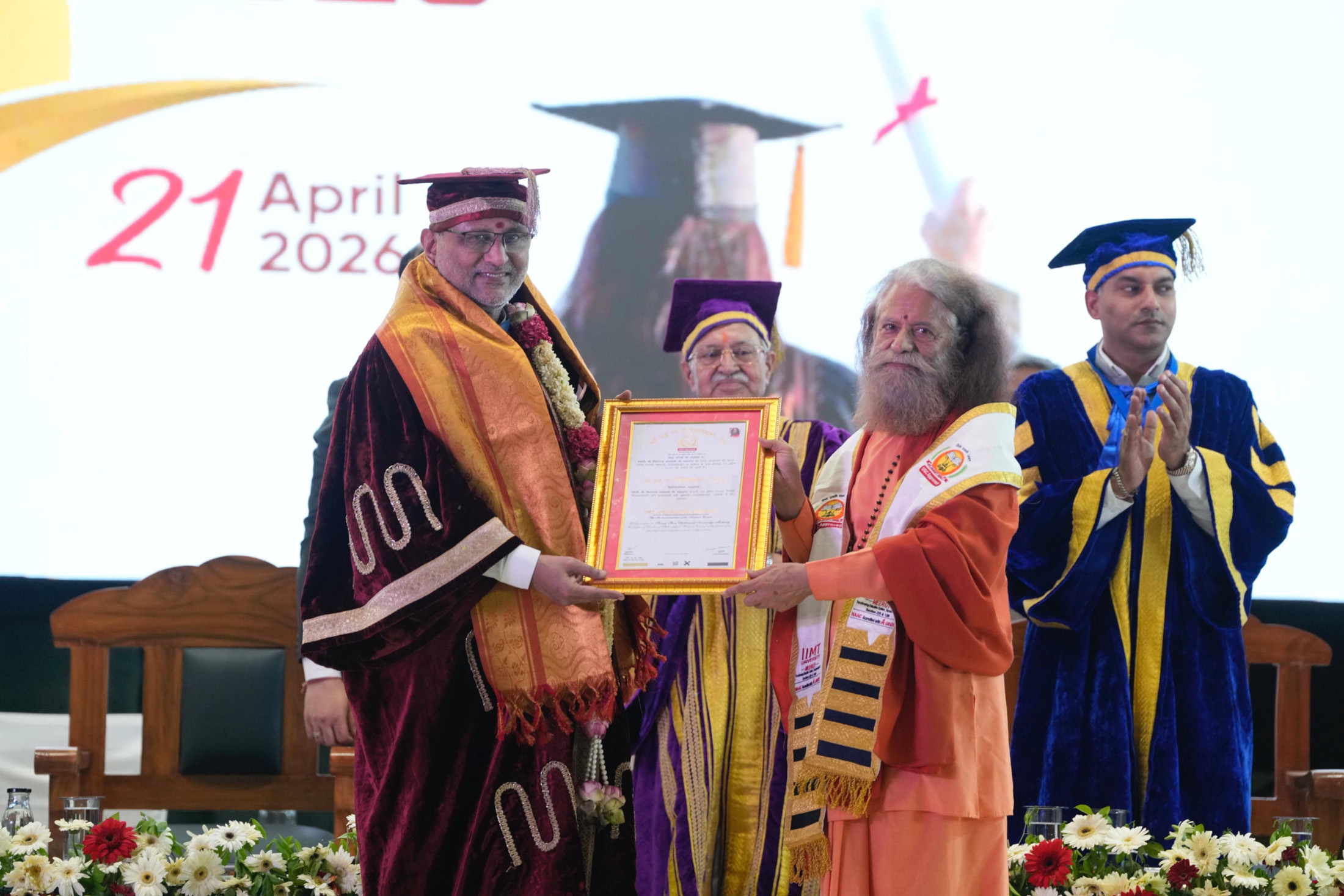
Shri C. P. Radhakrishnan presenting degrees at IIMT in 2026

== Academics ==
IIMT University offers diploma, undergraduate, postgraduate and doctoral programmes, and has been awarded an A grade by the NAAC assessment scale. The Vice President of India Shri C. P. Radhakrishnan addressed the 3rd convocation ceremony of IIMT University, Meerut, highlighting the importance of youth participation in nation-building and encouraging graduates to contribute towards India’s vision of becoming a developed nation by 2047.

=== Rankings ===
Ranking/Body	Achievement
QS I-GAUGE	Diamond Rating for excellence in education
WURI (World University Rankings for Innovation) 2026	Included in the Global Top 500 Innovative Universities list
Times Higher Education (THE) Sustainability Impact Rankings 2026	#1 in Uttar Pradesh, Top 18 in India, 301–400 globally
IIRF Rankings 2026	#1 New Age Emerging University in State, #2 in North Zone
R. World Green Rankings 2026	Titanium Band recognition for sustainability
R. World OBE Rankings 2025	Diamond Band recognition for outcome-based education

== Overview ==
Since its founding in 2016, IIMTU has expanded its campus facilities in Greater Noida. The institute's 2nd convocation was held in 2025 with Defence Minister Rajnath Singh as chief guest. The 3rd convocation was held in 2026 with Vice President C. P. Radhakrishnan as chief guest, during he described IIMTU as having "fast emerged as a centre of academic excellence". The Vice President of India Shri C. P. Radhakrishnan addressed the 3rd convocation ceremony of IIMT University, Meerut, highlighting the importance of youth participation in nation-building and encouraging graduates to contribute towards India’s vision of becoming a developed nation by 2047. During the COVID-19 pandemic in India, the university offered to take guardianship of 100 orphaned children and board them at its residential Meerut campus, supporting their schooling through to college level, subject to verification by the state government's Department of Women and Child Development. The Uttar Pradesh Cabinet has approved the Greater Noida off-campus centre for IIMT in January 2026, citing the need to expand higher education access across western Uttar Pradesh and the NCR region , The campus subsequently became the base for a media education partnership with the India Today Media Institute (ITMI), covering digital journalism, social media strategy, and related disciplines.

== Partnerships and expansion ==
The university has signed a memorandum of understanding with IIT Kanpur for augmentation courses in computer science programmes. The Uttar Pradesh government approved the establishment of an off-campus centre in Greater Noida.

=== Incidents ===
IIMT's administration drew criticism when students protested the withholding of exam admit cards over attendance shortfalls, with some alleging that payment was demanded to release them; at least one student attempted self-immolation on campus before police intervened and the examination was rescheduled.

Another institutional oversight emerged with the discovery that the university had hired Manoj Kumar Madan as vice-chancellor by accepting forged credentials, including fabricated doctoral and postgraduate degrees attributed to IIT Delhi and IIT Madras. Madan had held the position for approximately eight months before a tip exposed him, after which he consequentlt faced fraud charges. IIT Delhi confirmed the degrees were fake, and the university filed a police complaint.

The IIMT campus has had sectarian incidents occur during Holi season in both 2025 and 2026. In 2025 a student who was seen performing namaz prayers in an open area was arrested under Bharatiya Nyaya Sanhita Section 299, for offending religious beliefs, after protests by local groups. A protest by approximately 400 Muslim students demanding his immediate release led to six further arrests. Three security personnel were suspended. In 2026, A video allegedly showed a fasting Muslim student being chased and assaulted on campus, the university's legal cell attributed the event to confusion during the holi festival. After the spread of the video, a brawl between two groups of students occurred outside the campus gate.The university said it formed an internal inquiry committee to look into the events.

== Departments and facilities ==
The main campus spans 100 acres in Ganga Nagar and includes residential hostel accommodation for students as well as hospital facilities operated by its medical and allied health colleges.

IIMT's departments include:

- School of Engineering and Technology
- School of Computer Science and Applications
- School of Commerce and Management
- School of Life Science and Technology (Biotechnology, Microbiology)
- School of Basic Sciences and Technology
- School of Arts and Humanities
- School of Agricultural Sciences
- School of Media, Film and Television Studies
- School of Hotel Management, Catering and Tourism
- School of Pharmaceutical Sciences
- IIMT College of Medical Sciences
- IIMT Ayurvedic Medical College and Hospital
- IIMT College and Hospital of Naturopathy and Yogic Sciences
- College of Law
- College of Education

== See also ==
- Education in Uttar Pradesh
- List of Universities in Uttar Pradesh
- List of educational institutions in Meerut district
