= Memorial University (disambiguation) =

Memorial University is a comprehensive university located primarily in St. John's, Newfoundland and Labrador, Canada.

Memorial University may also refer to:

- Florida Memorial University, a private coeducational four-year university in Miami Gardens, Florida
- Hubert Kairuki Memorial University, a university in Tanzania
- Lincoln Memorial University, a private four-year co-educational liberal arts college located in Harrogate, Tennessee
- Shri Ramswaroop Memorial University, private university in Barabanki, Uttar Pradesh, India
- SRM University (disambiguation) (Shri Ramasamy Memorial University), several universities in India
