= CVPS =

CVPS may refer to:

- Central Vermont Public Service a former electricity supplier in Vermont, United States
- City Vocational Public School, a school in Meerut, India
- Colégio Visconde de Porto Seguro, a school in São Paulo, Brazil
