= Vardhman Academy =

Location
- Tirthankar Mahavir Marg, Railway Road; Meerut, Uttar Pradesh 250002; India; 28.9795°N 77.6858°E

Information
- Type: Private
- Motto: Learning-by-doing
- Established: 1981
- President: Anil Kumar Jain
- Principal: Rupali Chaudhary
- Gender: Co-educational
- Campus: Urban
- Houses: Shivaji, Jawahar, Ashoka, Tagore
- Mascot: Lion
- Affiliation: Central Board of Secondary Education
- Website: vardhmanacademy.com

Vardhman Academy is a private secondary school run by the Jain Boarding House Society in Meerut, India. It is a co-educational day-cum-boarding school affiliated to the Central Board of Secondary Education (CBSE).

== History ==
Jain Boarding House Society was founded in 1909 to disseminate the knowledge of Jain Philosophy and Jain Teachings among the pupils. The Vardhman Academy school was established by the society on 20 July 1981. The current principal of the school is Ms. Poonam Singh. In 2011, the school opened its second campus in Ganga Nagar, catering to the students in Mawana-Hastinapur region.

== Affiliation and examination ==
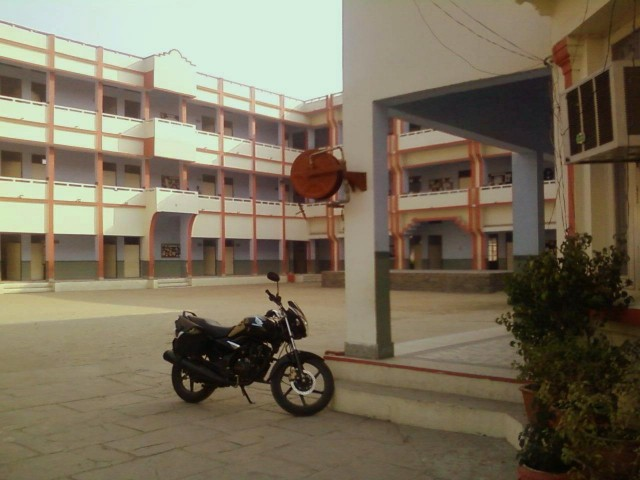
Vardhman Academy, Railway Road Campus

The school is affiliated to the Central Board of Secondary Education and offers education up to the 12th grade in the streams of science and commerce. Jain Dharma and Moral Science education is compulsory for students up to 8th grade. Unit tests, Half yearly exam and Annual exam decides the promotion of students to the next higher class. Final examination for Class X and Class XII follows centralized public examination system conducted by Central Board of Secondary Education.

== Sports and co-curricular activities ==
The School has facility to support an array of sports activities like athletics, cricket, table tennis, chess, carrom, taekwondo, basketball, tchoukball, badminton and volleyball. The school also has a small stadium known as Gyan Sagar Stadium with a seating capacity of around 500 pupils. The students of the school are grouped into four houses, namely Tagore (Red), Shivaji (Yellow), Ashoka (Green) and Jawahar (Blue). Inter house matches are organized throughout the session and the performance of every house team is recorded for the overall championship. As a part of co-curricular activities quizzes, debates and cultural functions are organized from time to time providing an opportunity to the students to showcase their talent. The school always encourages the students to participate in various national and inter-school competitions.

== See also ==
- List of educational institutions in Meerut
