= Kabir Ahmad Jaisi =

- Born: 16 November 1934; Jais in District Raebarely, Uttar Pradesh
- Died: 7 January 2013 (aged 78)
- Education: Phd
- Writing career
- Genres: Criticism, Academician
- Notable awards: Saadi Literary Award

Prof. Kabir Ahmad Jaisi was born 16 November 1934 at Jais in District Raebarely, Uttar Pradesh. He got his early education in Azamgarh at Shibli High School and Shibli Inter College. He joined the AMU in 1961 for his graduation. He topped the list of the successful candidates in B.A. (1963). He did his M.A. Persian (1965), and Ph.D (1973) from the Aligarh Muslim University, Aligarh. He died 7 January 2013.

He was the 2008 recipient of the Saadi Literary Award.

== Awards ==
- University Gold Medal for standing 1st in B.A, 1963
- U.P Urdu Academy Award for his following books
  - Sahra sahra, 1972
  - Baz Ghast, 1975
  - Trikh-e- Adabiyat-e-Tajikistan, 1977
  - Allama Iqbal Musleh-Quran-e-Akhir, 1982
  - Chand Iran Shinas, 1993
- Nawoosh(Lahore) Award, 1986
- Soviet Land Nehru Award, 1989
- MIR Award, 1993
- Certificate of Merit(By President of India), 1994
- Fakhruddin Ali Ahmad Ghalib Award, 2006

(for Persian Research and Criticism)
