= List of educational institutions in Meerut district =

Meerut district is an education hub in western Uttar Pradesh, India. It has 4 universities, 80 technical-professional colleges, 150 academic colleges, and 2 medical colleges. The district also has over 380 schools.

== Universities ==
Meerut has two State universities, three private university:

List of Universities
Name of University	Type
Chaudhary Charan Singh University	State
Sardar Vallabh Bhai Patel University of Agriculture and Technology	State
Shobhit University	Private
Swami Vivekanand Subharti University	Private
IIMT University	Private

== Colleges affiliated to Dr. A.P.J. Abdul Kalam Technical University ==
All professional education in the city comes under the jurisdiction of Dr. A.P.J. Abdul Kalam Technical University, Lucknow. Hence, all colleges offering engineering, pharmacy, hotel management and fashion design are affiliated to it.

=== Engineering ===
The district has only Government engineering college which name is Sir Chhoturam Institute Of Engineering and Technology affiliated with Meerut University and 34 engineering colleges affiliated to Mahamaya Technical University. The following table lists the branches of engineering each institute offers in bachelors courses. Many of these colleges, along with various streams of engineering, also offer MBA and MCA courses.

List of Engineering Colleges
College Name	Computer Science and Engineering	Information Technology	Electronics and Communication	Mechanical	Electrical and Electronics	Civil	Electrical	Electronics and Instrumentation	MBA	MCA	Other
Bharat Institute of Technology	Yes	Yes	Yes	Yes	Yes	Yes	No	No	Yes	Yes	Instrumentation and Control, Chemical
Meerut Institute of Engineering and Technology	Yes	Yes	Yes	Yes	No	Yes	No	Yes	Yes	Yes	Biotechnology, Chemical
Vidya College of Engineering	Yes	Yes	Yes	Yes	Yes	Yes	No	Yes	Yes	Yes	No
Venkateshwara Institute of Technology	Yes	Yes	Yes	Yes	Yes	Yes	No	No	Yes	No	No
ABSS Institute of Technology	Yes	Yes	Yes	Yes	No	Yes	Yes	No	Yes	No	No
Translam Institute of Technology and Management	Yes	Yes	Yes	Yes	No	Yes	No	No	Yes	No	No

=== Pharmacy ===
The following colleges offer a 4-year Bachelor of Pharmacy degree course:

- Bharat Institute of Technology

== Colleges affiliated to Chaudhary Charan Singh University ==
=== Constituent College ===
Sir Chhotu Ram Institute of Engineering and Technology is the constituent college of the university. It was established in July 2002 and is the only engineering college in the city which is Government and not affiliated to Mahamaya Technical University. It offers Bachelor of Technology programs in 13 streams. It is also the mother institute of the National Agriculture Institute, the Government Central food Institute. Autonomous status has been granted to the institute by the Government.

==== Infrastructure ====
The institute is spread across two campuses, the east campus (77 acres) and the west campus (271 acres) situated 3 km apart. Facilities are provided for cricket, volleyball, table tennis, lawn tennis, football, basketball, badminton, baseball, and general physical fitness (gymnasium).

==== Programs ====
B.Tech. (Bachelor of Technology) courses are offered in 13 fields of engineering and technology and all have been accredited by the National Board of Accreditation (NBA)

- Chemical Engineering
- Electronics Engineering
- Mechanical Engineering
- Computer Science and Engineering
- Information Technology
- Food Technology
- Agriculture engineering
- Civil Engineering
- Electrical engineering

=== Govt and Aided Colleges ===
The city arts and science colleges are affiliated to Chaudhary Charan Singh University.

College Name	Location	B.Sc	M.Sc	B.Com	M.Com	B.A	M.A	B.Ed	M.Ed	Other (If Any)
Meerut College	Meerut	Yes	Yes	Yes	Yes	Yes	Yes	Yes	Yes	LLB, LLM, MJMC

== Medical colleges ==
The city has the following medical colleges:

List of Medical Colleges
College Name	Affiliating University	Type
Subharti Medical College	Swami Vivekananda Subharti University	Private
LLRM Medical College	Chaudhary Charan Singh University	Public

== Schools ==
Meerut has innumerable schools. The schools in the city are affiliated to either the CBSE, IB, ICSE, NIOS, or UP Board.

=== CBSE ===
- Army Public School
- Ashoka Academy
- BNG International School
- City Vocational Public School
- Dewan Public School
- Dayawati Modi Academy
- Darshan Academy
- Guru Tegh Bhadur Public School
- K.L. International School
- St. John's Senior Secondary School
- Shanti Niketan Vidyapeeth
- St. Peter's Academy
- Vardhman Academy
- Vidya Global School
- The Aaryans
- St Francis World School
- Meerut Public School
- Meerut Public Girls' School
- Meerut Public School for Girls
- IIMT Academy
- Gargi Girls' School
- MIET Public School
- Translam Academy
- JP Academy
- Brainz Edu World

=== ICSE ===
- St. Mary's Academy
- St. Thomas English Medium School
- Sophia Girls’ School
- St. Francis' Convent School
- All Saints School

=== UP Board ===
- Government Inter College (GIC)
- Raghunath Girls Inter College (RG)

== See also ==
- List of colleges affiliated with Mahamaya Technical University
- Education in Uttar Pradesh
