= Jaiswal (surname) =

Indian surname

Location of Jais, historical Jaiswal center

Jaiswal (/dʒɑːjəsəvɑːl/; IAST: jāyasavāla) or Jayswal or Jayaswal is a surname used by many Hindu communities. Jaiswals are mainly traders and deal in various commodities. Historically, some of them excelled in the art of distilling liquor, and many remain involved in its legal sale today.

== History ==
The origin of the Jaiswal community is not known, but it is speculated that their ancestors hailed from the town 'Jais' in Uttar Pradesh and came to known as Jaiswals. They are mostly found in North India including Agra, Delhi, Uttar Pradesh, Bihar, Maharashtra and Rajasthan.

In 2003, Jaiswal Kalwars or Baniyas were classified and listed as Other Backward Class (OBC) by several state governments, including Delhi, Rajasthan, Bihar, and Uttar Pradesh. However, in Haryana, Punjab, Himachal Pradesh, Jharkhand, Jammu and Kashmir, and Assam, Jaiswal Kalwars are not included in the state or central OBC lists, and are therefore treated under the General (Unreserved) category in those states.

== Notable people ==
- Ankush Jaiswal (cricketer)
- Madan Prasad Jaiswal (Indian politician)
- Naina Jaiswal (table tennis player)
- Pankaj Jaiswal (cricketer)
- Pradeep Jaiswal (Maharashtra politician)
- Pragya Jaiswal (actress and model)
- Radhey Shyam Jaisawal (UP politician)
- Samiksha Jaiswal (TV actress)
- Sanjeev Jaiswal (actor)
- Sanjiv Jaiswal (film director and producer)
- Shankar Prasad Jaiswal (Indian politician)
- Sanjaya Lall (economist)
- Suvira Jaiswal (Indian historian)
- Yashasvi Jaiswal (Indian cricketer)
- Anantram Jaiswal (Freedom fighter and founder of Samajwadi Party)
- Dilip Kumar Jaiswal (Indian politician)
- Jawahar Lal Jaiswal (Indian politician)
- GCR Jaiswal (Vice-Chancellor, Awadh University)
- Gorakh Prasad Jaiswal (Indian politician)
- Navin Jaiswal (Jharkhand politician)
- Ravindra Jaiswal (UP politician)
- Rai Bahadur Thakur Jaiswal (Jharkhand businessperson)
- Ritu Jaiswal (Bihar politician)
- Randhir Jaiswal (Indian Diplomat)
- Sanjay Jaiswal (Indian politician)
- Saligram Jaiswal (freedom fighter and politician)
- Sriprakash Jaiswal (Indian politician)

== See also ==
- Jaiswal Jain
- Kalwar (caste)
