= Education in Uttar Pradesh =

Aspect of Indian society

Education in Uttar Pradesh comprises the primary, secondary, and higher education systems serving the residents of India's most populous state, home to over 1199.88 million people, and with 95% enrollment in elementary education. Uttar Pradesh hosts premier institutions such as the Indian Institutes of Technology (IIT) in Kanpur and Varanasi (BHU), Banaras Hindu University, and Aligarh Muslim University, which contribute significantly to technical and higher education.

== History ==
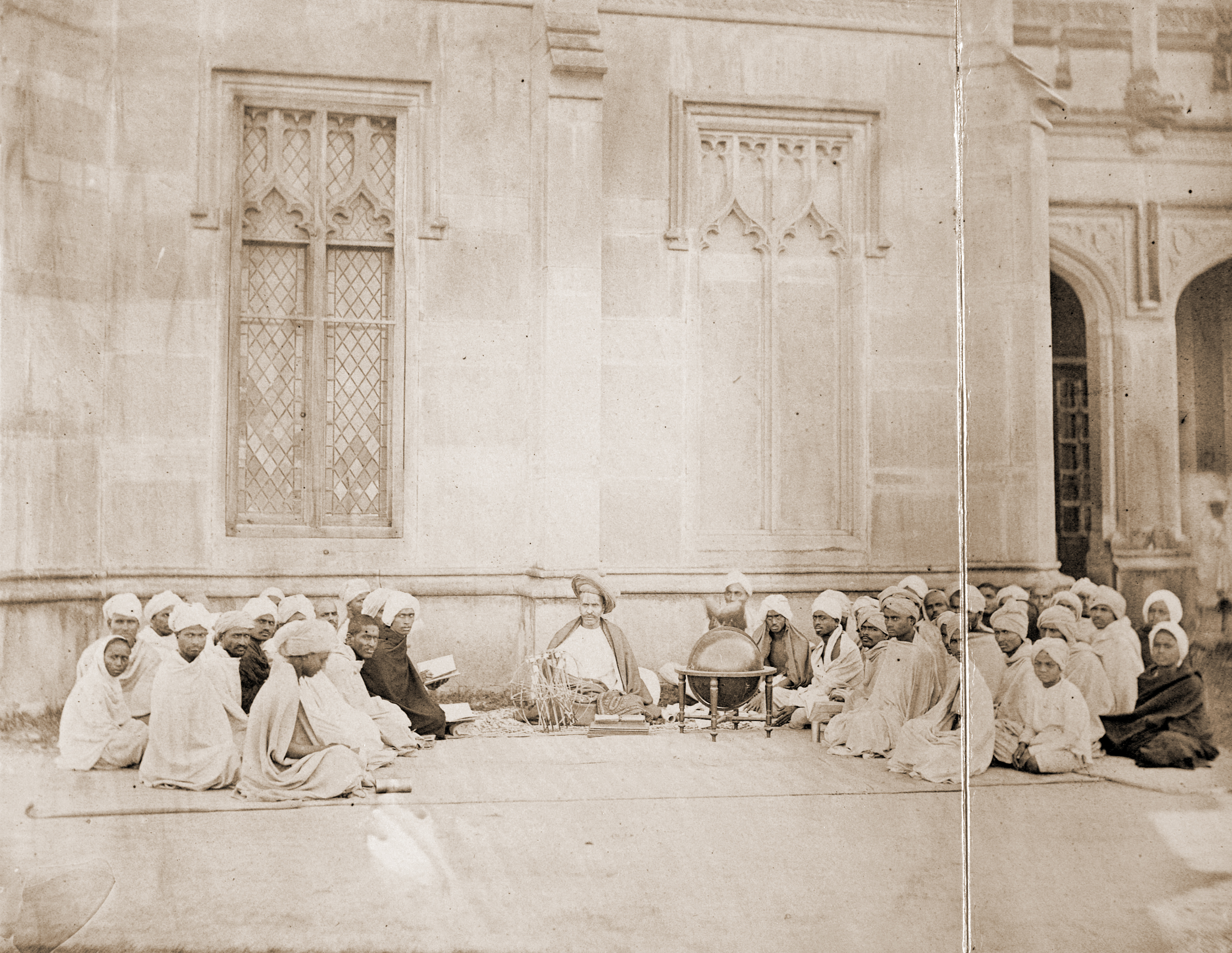
Bapudeva Sastri, holding globe, professor of astronomy, teaching a class at Queen's College, Varanasi, 1870

Sanskrit-based education comprising the learning of Vedic to Gupta periods, coupled with the later Pali corpus of knowledge and a vast store of ancient to medieval learning in Persian/Arabic languages, had formed the edifice of Hindu-Buddhist-Muslim education, till the rise of British power. But, the system became decadent as it missed the advancements that were taking place in Europe during and after the Renaissance, resulting in large educational gaps. Measures were initiated by the British administration for making liberal, universal education available in this area through a network of schools to university system on the European pattern.

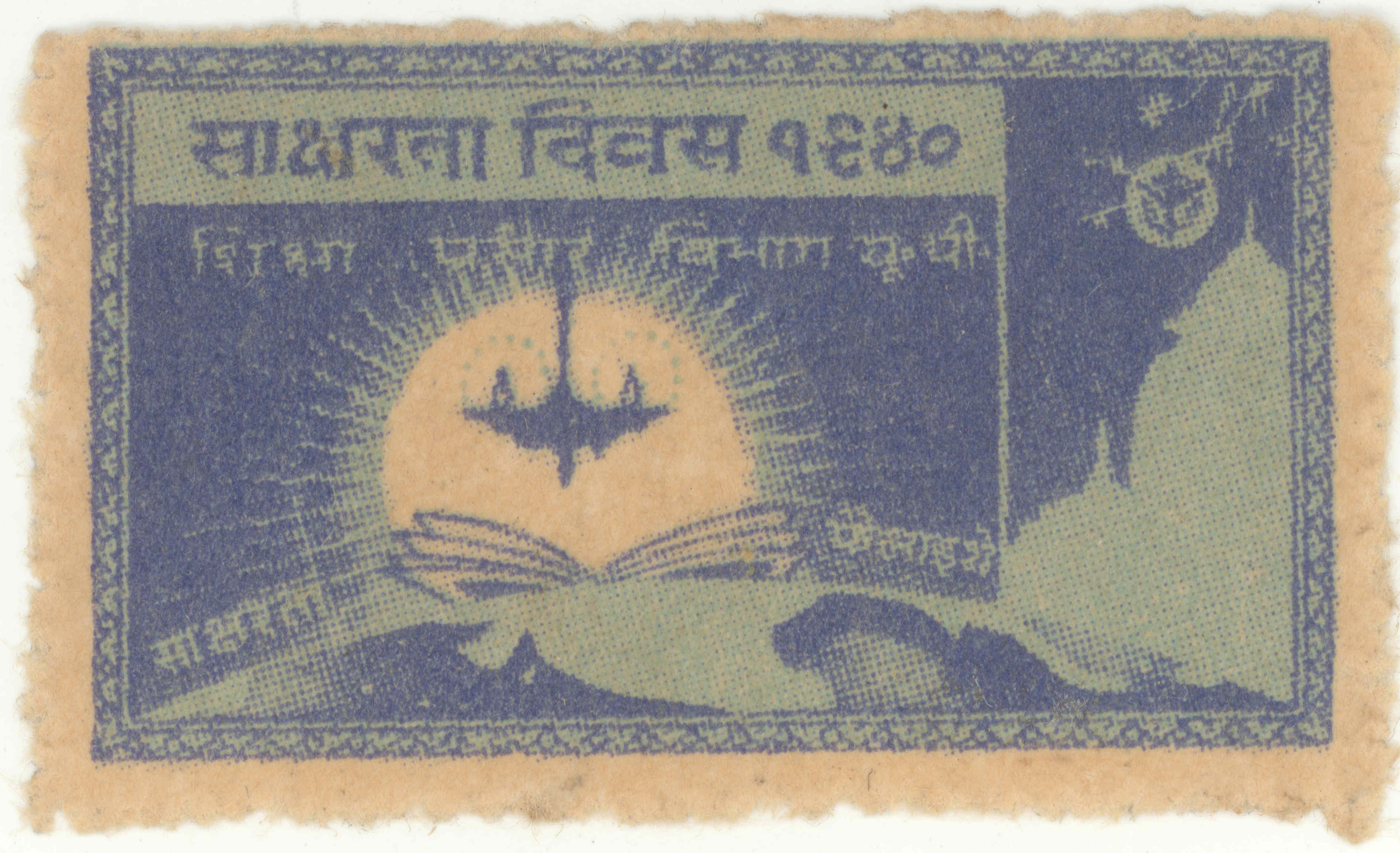
Stamp Issued by Department of Education, Government of United Province, British India, 1940

However, a real turning point came due to the efforts of educationalists like Pandit Madan Mohan Malviya and Sir Syed Ahmad Khan, who championed the cause of learning and supported British efforts to spread it.

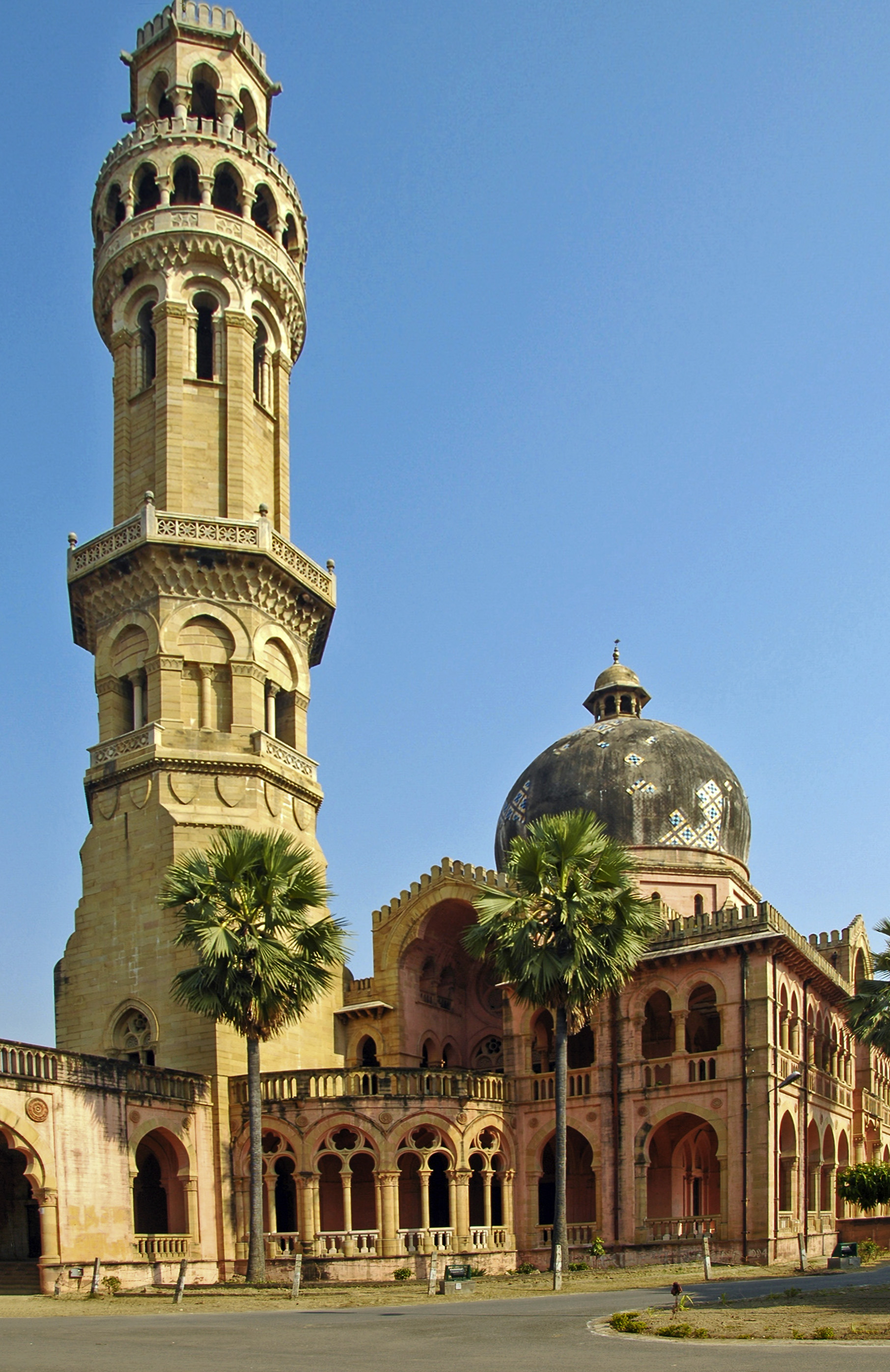
Allahabad University, established 1887

=== Post-independence ===
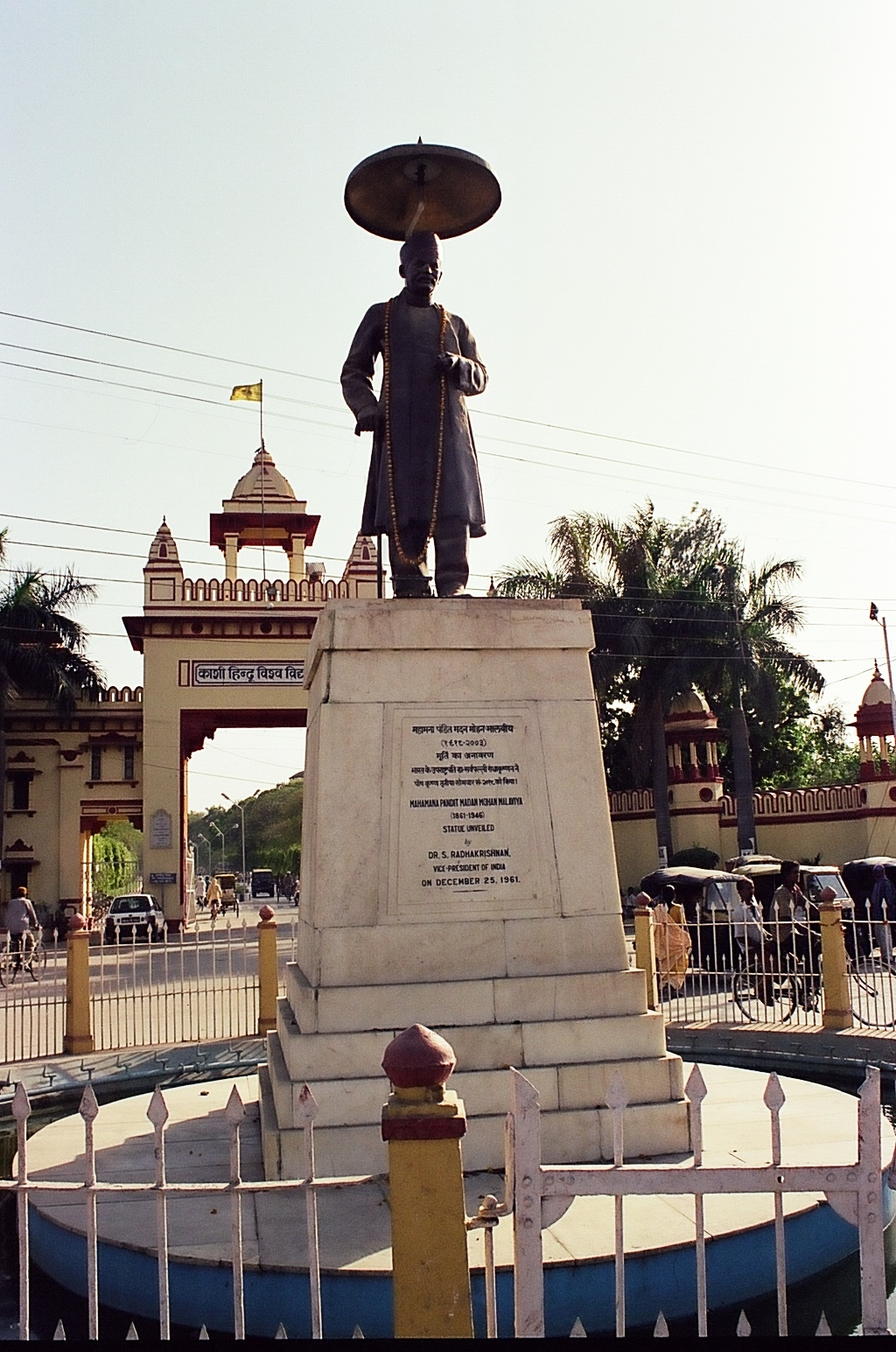
Statue of Pandit Madan Mohan Malaviya at the entrance of Banaras Hindu University, established 1916

After independence, the state of U.P. has continued to make investment over the years in all sectors of education and has achieved significant success in overcoming general educational backwardness and illiteracy. The increase in overall literacy rate is due to persistent multi-pronged efforts made by the state government: to enrol and retain children, specially of weaker sections, in schools; to effectively implement the adult education programmes; and to establish centres of higher education. As a result, U.P. is ranked amongst the first few States to have successfully implemented the Education For All policy. The following is indicative of the gradual progress:

In 1981, the literacy rate in U.P. was 28% and it increased to 42% in 1991. In 1991, the adult literacy rate (per cent literates among those aged 15 and above) was 38% and increased to 49% in 1998, an increase of 11 per centage in the seven-year period. But, the differential between female and male literacy remained high: while in 1991, male literacy was 56% and female literacy 25%, eight years later in 1999, as per survey estimates, the male literacy became 73% and female literacy 43% (NFHS II).

One more notable feature in the state has been the persistence of higher levels of illiteracy in the younger age group, more so in females, especially in the rural areas. In the late 1980s, the incidence of illiteracy in the 10–14 age group was as high as 32% for rural males and 61% for rural females; and more than two-thirds of all rural girls in the 12–14 age group never went to school. Only 25% of the girls in 7+ age group were able to read and write in 1991 and this figure went down to 19% for rural areas: it was 11% for the scheduled castes, 8% for scheduled castes in rural areas and 8% for the entire rural population in the most educationally backward districts. In terms of completion of basic or essential educational attainment (the primary or the secondary education), in 1992–1993, only 50% of literate males and 40% of literate females could complete the cycle of eight years of schooling (the primary and middle stages). Possibly, Bihar is the only state in India which lags behind U.P. in education.

The problems of state's education system are complex. Due to public apathy the public schools are run inefficiently. Privately run schools (including those run by Christian missionaries) are functional, but expensive and so beyond the reach of ordinary people.

In order to make the population totally literate, steps are being taken by the government to involve public participation, including the help of NGOs and other organisations. There are also special programmes, like the World Bank aided DPEP. As a result, progress in adult education has been made and the census of 2001 indicates a male literacy rate of 70.23% and a female literacy rate of 42.98%.

Presently, there are 866,361 primary schools, 8,459 higher secondary schools, 758 degree colleges and 26 universities in the state. Some of the oldest educational institutions – founded by the British, the pioneer educationalists and other social/religious reformers – are still functional. In addition, a number of highly competitive ivy league centres of higher or technical education have been established since Independence.

== Primary and secondary education ==
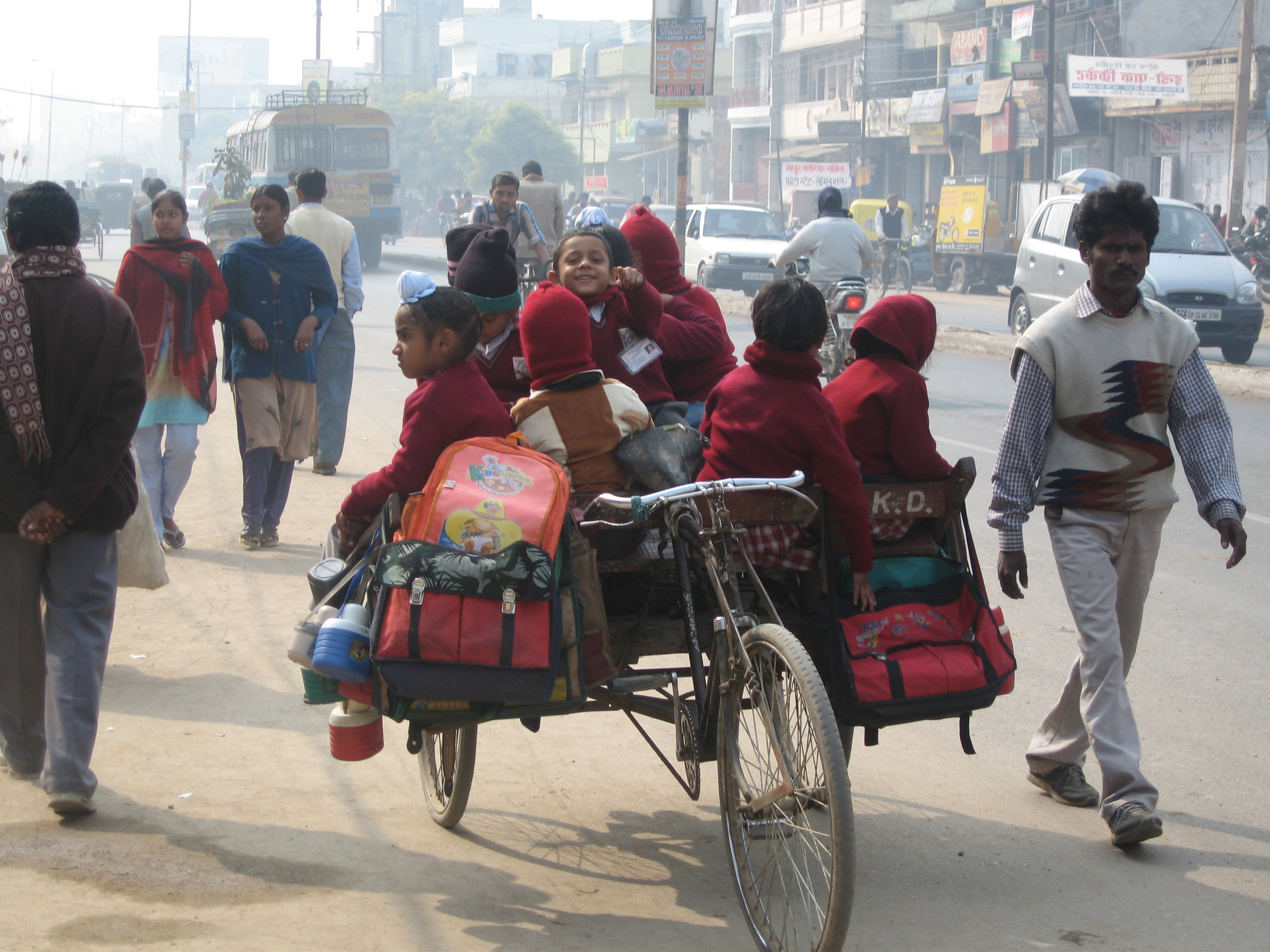
Children in a school-rickshaw on their way to school

Most schools in the state are affiliated to Uttar Pradesh Madhyamik Shiksha Parishad (commonly referred to as U.P. board) with English or Hindi as the medium of instruction, while schools affiliated to Central Board of Secondary Education (CBSE) and Council for the Indian School Certificate Examinations (CISCE) with English as medium of instruction are also present.

== Higher education ==
Considering the size of Uttar Pradesh, it is not surprising that it has a large number of academic and research institutes. These institutes are either under the jurisdiction of the State Government, the Central Government, or are privately run. The state has two IITs – at Kanpur and Varanasi, an IIM at Lucknow, an LU at Lucknow, an NIT and an IIIT at Allahabad. A good number of State and Central Government universities are founded in Uttar Pradesh to provide Higher Education in various course works.

The Rajiv Gandhi Institute of Petroleum Technology: The Ministry of Petroleum and Natural Gas (MOP&NG), Government of India set up the institute at Jais, Rae Bareli district, Uttar Pradesh through an Act of Parliament. RGIPT has been accorded Institute of National Importance. With the status of a deemed university, the institute awards degrees in its own right. RGIPT is co-promoted as an energy domain specific institute by six oil public sector units (ONGC, IOCL, OIL, GAIL, BPCL and HPCL) in association with the Oil Industry Development Board (OIDB). The institute is associated with leading International Universities/Institutions specializing in the domain of Petroleum Technology.

Alongside above mentioned institutes of higher learning, in Uttar Pradesh, a range of Government Degree College has been set up by the Government of Uttar Pradesh for providing Higher Education to scholars who are interested in different course work (undergraduate, postgraduate and research) and program (Humanities, Science and Commerce) in higher studies. At present in Uttar Pradesh, 137 Government Degree Colleges has been established to fulfill the above criteria. The U.P. government administers and controls these colleges through Department of Higher Education, Uttar Pradesh; however, syllabus and affiliation to the universities concerned are depending upon the locality of Government Degree College. Beside government instructions, the government degree colleges also follow the norms and regulations of the University Grants Commission, New Delhi. Few private college likewise, IIMT Group of Institutions (Institute of Integrated Management and Technology) in Varanasi has been established. Uttar Pradesh Board of Technical Education is the body responsible for pre degree vocational and technical education.

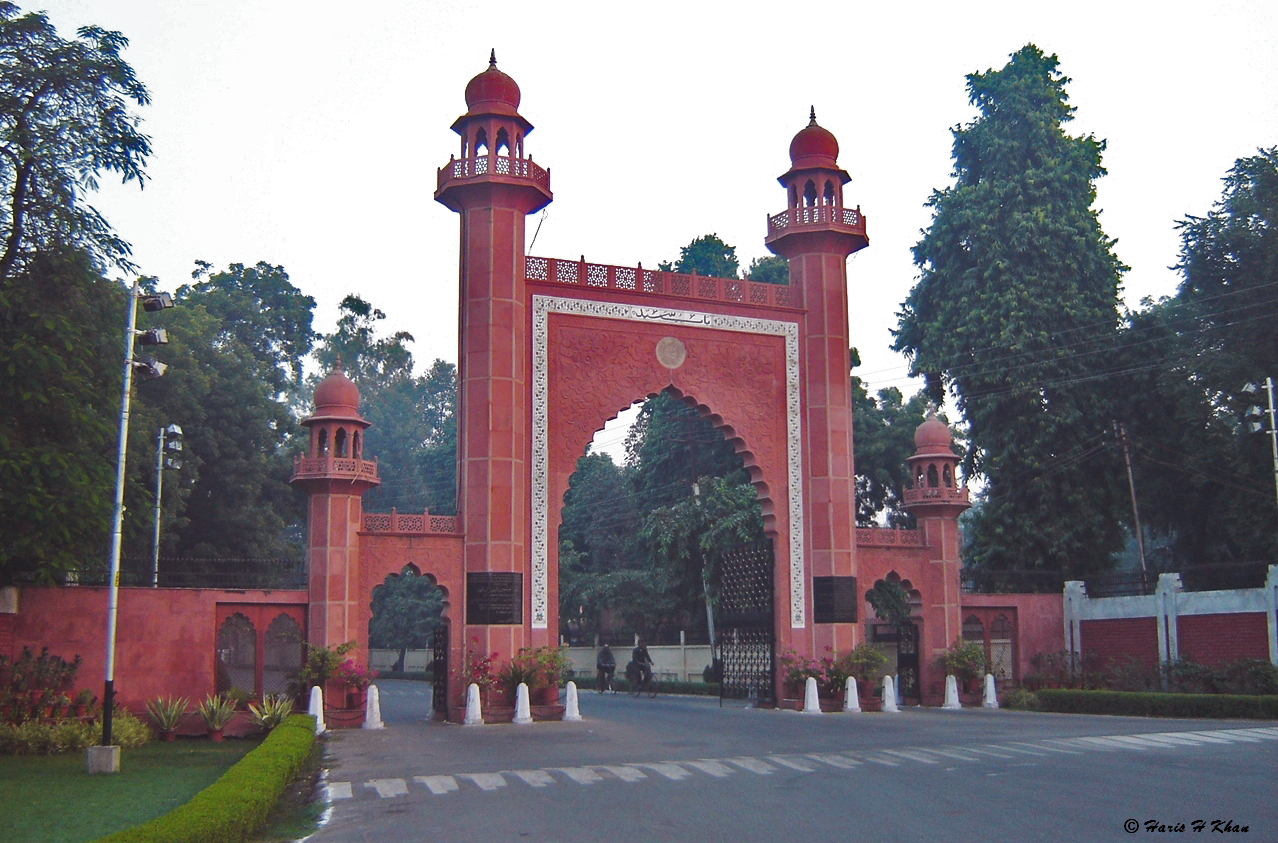
Bab-e-syed, the gateway to Aligarh Muslim University (AMU), established 1875

== Notable universities and institutes ==
Banaras Hindu University (BHU) is a Central University in Varanasi. It evolved from the Central Hindu College of Varanasi, envisioned as a Hindu university in April 1911 by Annie Wood Besant and Pandit Madan Mohan Malaviya. BHU began on 1 October 1917, with the Central Hindu College as its first constituent college. Most of the money for the university came from Hindu princes, and its present 1,350-acre (5.5 km^{2}) campus was built on land donated by the Kashi Naresh. Regarded as one of the largest residential universities in Asia, it has more than 128 independent teaching departments; several of its colleges—including science, linguistics, law, engineering (IIT (BHU) Varanasi) and medicine (IMS-BHU)—are ranked amongst the best in India. The university's total enrolment stands at just over 15,000 (including international students). It is the only university in India hosting one of the IITs on its premises (IIT BHU).

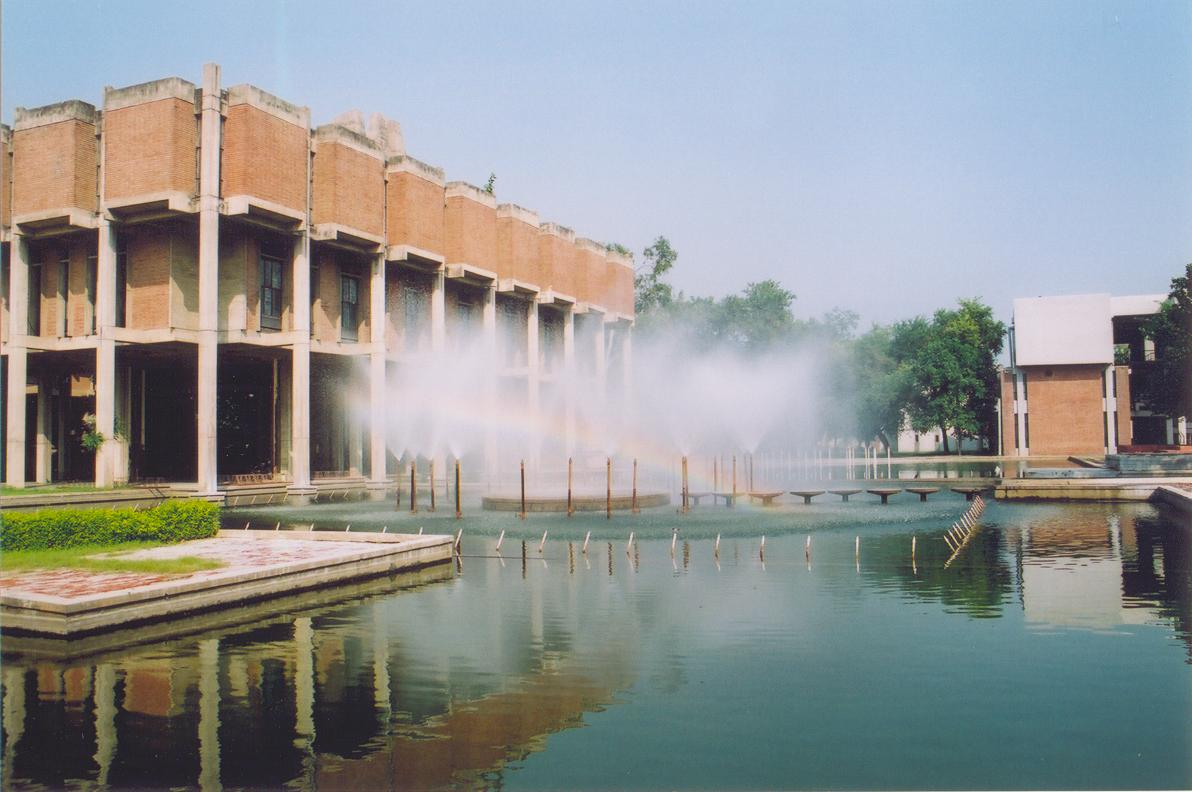
PK Kelkar Library, IIT Kanpur

The Indian Institute of Technology Kanpur (established in 1959 in the industrial city of Kanpur, and now known as IIT-Kanpur or IITK) is an Indian Institutes of Technology; it is primarily focused on undergraduate education in engineering and related science and technology, and research in these fields. It is among the few institutions which enjoys the status of an Institute of National Importance. IITK was the first college in India to offer education in computer science.

The Indian Institute of Technology (BHU) Varanasi traces its origins to three engineering and technological institutions established by Pandit Madan Mohan Malaviya in 1919–1923 in BHU. In 1971 these three colleges, viz. BENCO, MINMET and TECHNO, were merged to form the Institute of Technology (IT-BHU) and admissions were instituted jointly with the IIT's through the Joint Entrance Examination. In 2012, IT-BHU was officially rechristened as IIT (BHU) Varanasi. The institute has 13 departments and three inter disciplinary schools. It enjoys the status of an Institute of National Importance.

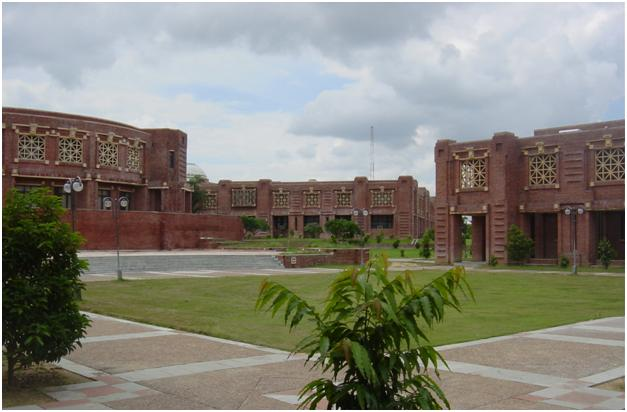
IIM Lucknow

The Indian Institute of Management Lucknow was established in 1984 by the government of India. It was the fourth Indian Institute of Management to be established in India, after IIM Calcutta, IIM Ahmedabad and IIM Bangalore. IIM Lucknow's 185-acre (75 ha) main campus is in Prabandh Nagar, about 21 kilometres (13 mi) from Lucknow railway station and 31 kilometres (19 mi) from Lucknow Airport. A second campus, focusing on executive programs, was established in Noida. According to the institute's website, IIM Lucknow is the first IIM in the country to establish a second campus.

Administrative building, MNNIT Allahabad

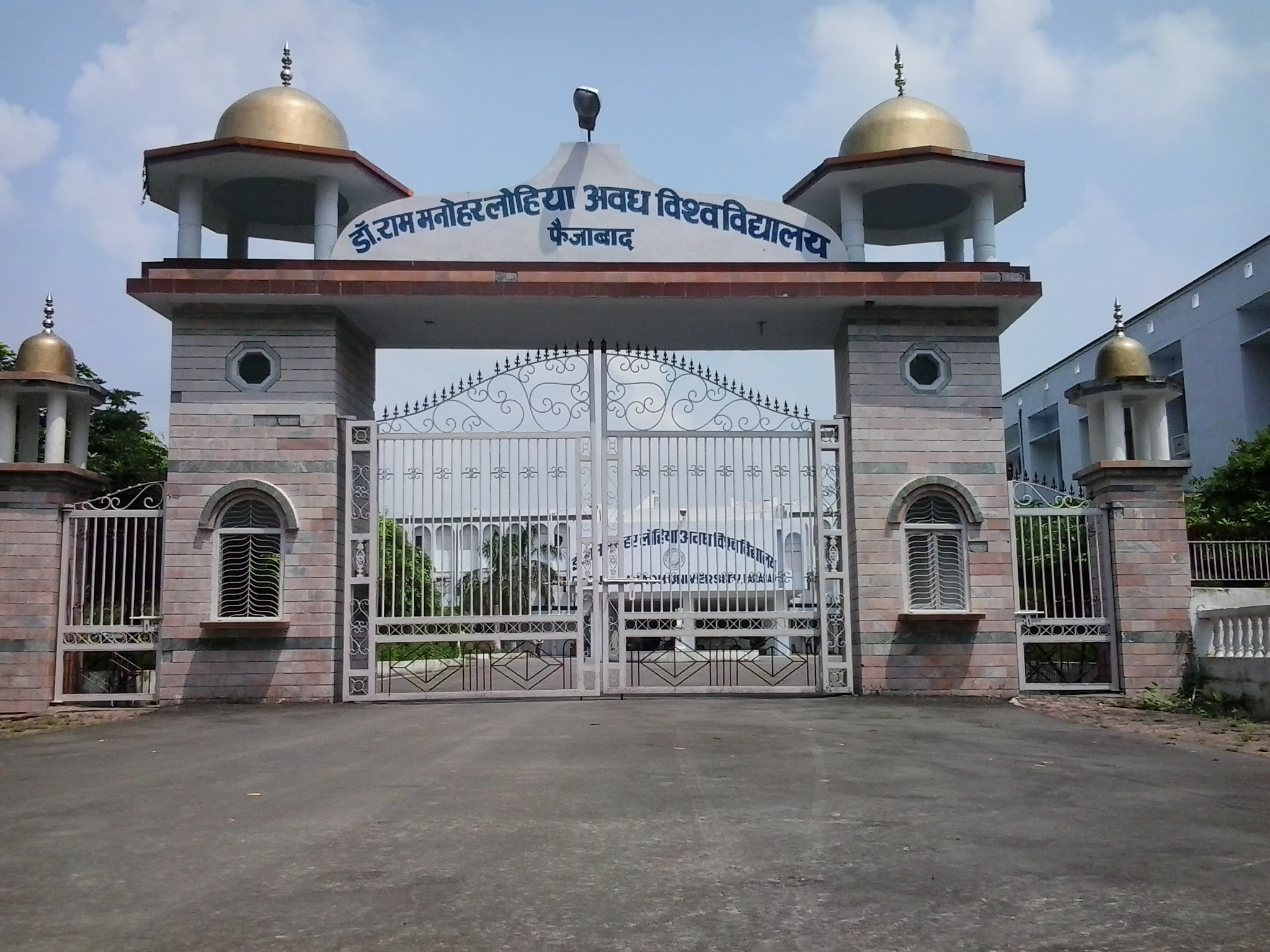
RMLU University Faizabad

The Motilal Nehru National Institute of Technology, Allahabad (MNNIT) was formerly Motilal Nehru Regional Engineering College, Allahabad. It is one of the leading institutes in the country, established in 1961 as a joint enterprise of the governments of India and Uttar Pradesh in accordance with the plan to establish regional engineering colleges. On 26 June 2002 the college became a deemed university and is now known as an Institute of National Importance. MNNIT was the first college in India to grant a Bachelor of Technology degree in computer science and engineering, and among the very few colleges in India to have a PARAM supercomputer.

RGIPT Raebareli

The Rajiv Gandhi Institute of Petroleum Technology (RGIPT) in Jais, Raebareli was established by the Ministry of Petroleum and Natural Gas (MOP&NG) of the Government of India through an act of Parliament. RGIPT has been designated an Institute of National Importance, along with the Indian Institute of Technology (IIT) and Indian Institute of Management (IIM). With deemed university status, the institute awards degrees in its own right. RGIPT is co-sponsored as an energy-domain-specific institute by six oil public-sector units (ONGC, IOCL, OIL, GAIL, BPCL and HPCL), in association with the Oil Industry Development Board (OIDB). The institute is associated with international universities and institutions specialising in petroleum technology.

Rajiv Gandhi National Aviation University (RGNAU) is an autonomous public central university located in the Fursatganj Airfield, Rae Bareli, Uttar Pradesh.

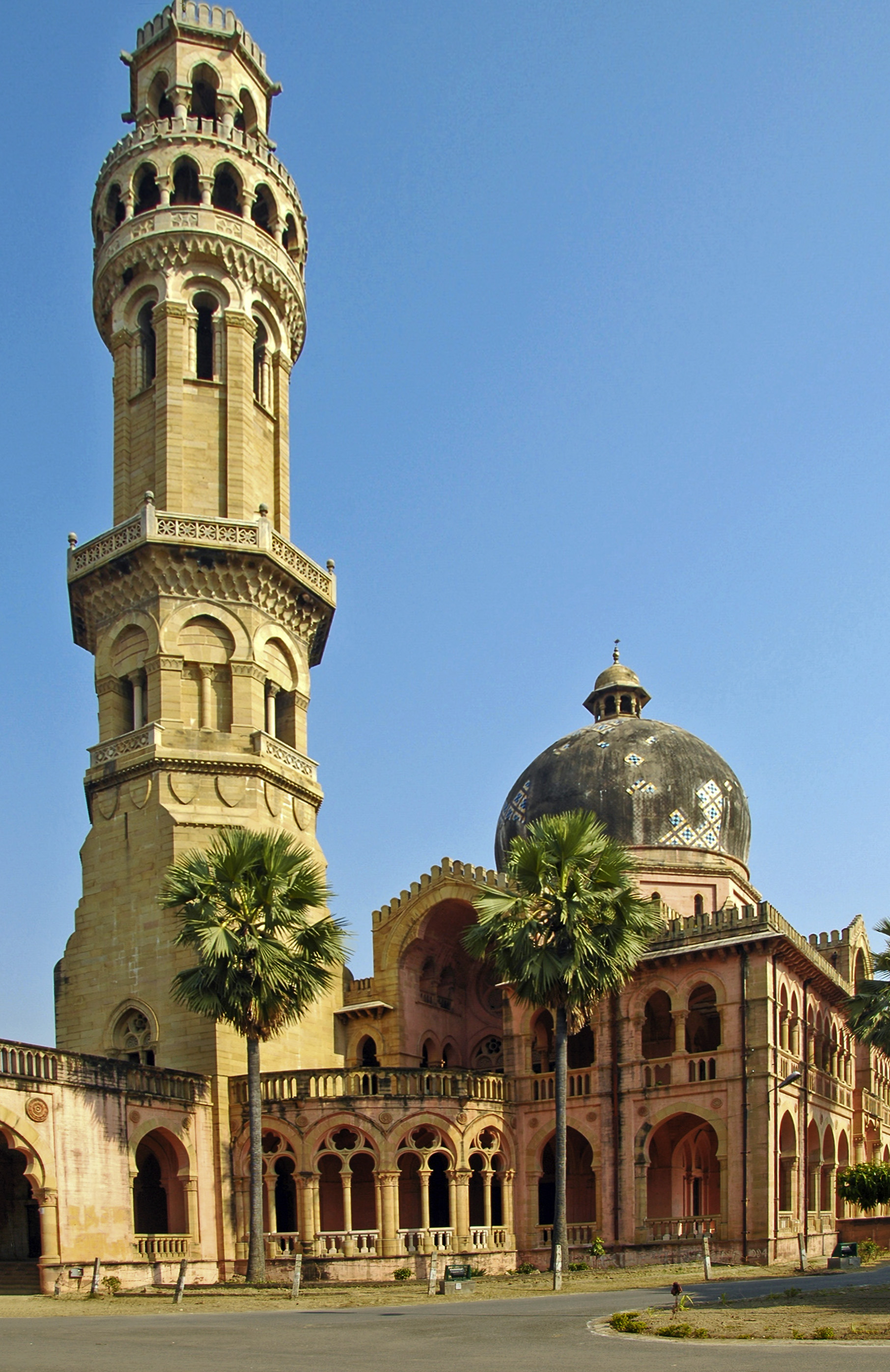
Allahabad University

Allahabad University is a Central University located in Allahabad. Its origins lie in Muir Central College, named after Lt. Governor of North-Western Provinces Sir William Muir in 1876; Muir suggested a Central University at Allahabad, which later evolved into the present institution. At one point it was called the "Oxford of the East", and on 24 June 2005 its Central University status was restored through the University Allahabad Act, 2005 of the Parliament of India. It is the fourth-oldest university in the country.

The Aligarh Muslim University is a residential academic institution. This university is spread over an area of 1155 acres (467.6 ha) . Modelled on the University of Cambridge, it was established by Sir Syed Ahmed Khan in 1875 as Mohammedan Anglo-Oriental College and was granted the status of a Central University by an Act of Parliament in 1920. Located in the city of Aligarh, it was among the first institutions of higher learning established during the British Raj.

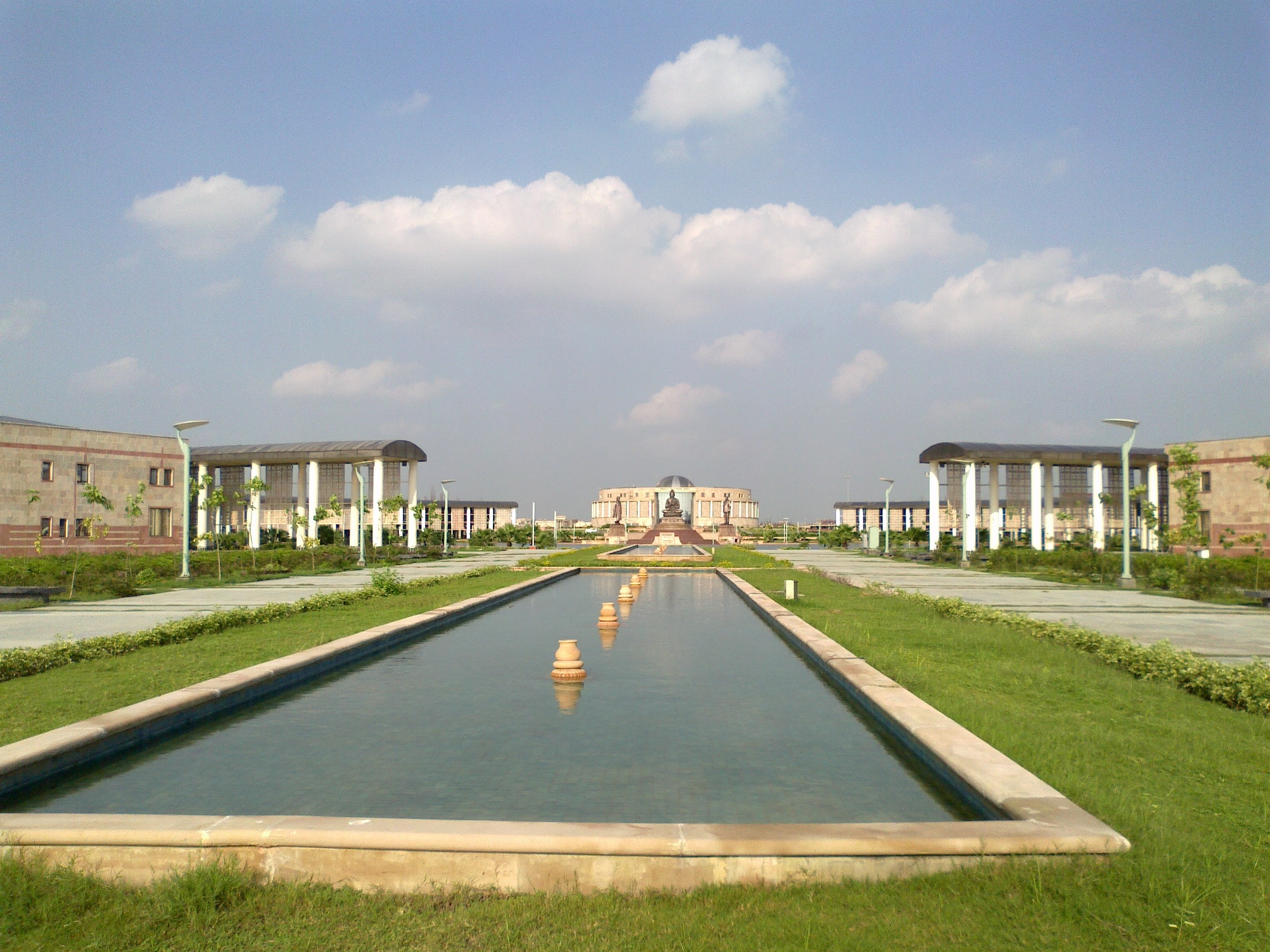
Gautam Buddha University

The Gautam Buddha University was established in 2002 by the Uttar Pradesh government. The university commenced its first academic session in 2008. It basically focusses on research and offers integrated dual-degree courses in engineering, biotechnology, Bsc, BBA+MBA, BBA+LLB, humanities and Buddhist studies. Its campus is spread over 511 acres and is located in Greater Noida in close proximity to many industrial units. The university has eight schools: Gautam Buddha University School of Engineering, Gautam Buddha University School of Information and Communication Technology, Gautam Buddha University School of Biotechnology, Gautam Buddha University School of Vocational Studies and Applied Sciences, Gautam Buddha University School of Management, Gautam Buddha University School of Law, Justice and Governance, Gautam Buddha University School of Buddhist Studies and Civilization and Gautam Buddha University School of Humanities and Social Sciences.

The Indian Institute of Information Technology, Allahabad was established in 1999 by the government of India. The institute was conferred deemed university status in 2000, empowering it to award degrees following the setting of its own examinations. The new campus has been developed on 100 acres (0.40 km^{2}) of land at Deoghat, Jhalwa, on the outskirts of Allahabad. The campus and other buildings have been styled on patterns developed by mathematics professor Roger Penrose. IIITA offers a BTech degree in both information technology and electronics and communications engineering. Admission is through the All India Engineering Entrance Examination (AIEEE). Foreign students are accepted based on SAT II scores. IIITA has an extension campus at Amethi, Sultanpur District (the Rajiv Gandhi Institute of Information Technology).

The Dr. A.P.J. Abdul Kalam Technical University is a well-known technical university, formerly known as Uttar Pradesh Technical University. It provides technical education, research and training in such programs as engineering, technology, architecture, town planning, pharmacy and applied arts and crafts which the central government decrees in consultation with All India Council for Technical Education (AICTE). There are five government engineering colleges of GBTU:

- Harcourt Butler Technological Institute, Kanpur
- Kamla Nehru Institute of Technology, Sultanpur
- Madan Mohan Malaviya Engineering College, Gorakhpur
- Institute of Engineering and Technology, Lucknow
- Bundelkhand Institute of Engineering & Technology, Jhansi

Other schools in the state capital, Lucknow, include Colvin Taluqdars' College, St. Francis' College, Lucknow and La Martinière College. Secondary schools include the Loreto Convent, St Agnes' Loreto High School and City Montessori School. The Babasaheb Bhimrao Ambedkar University, Lucknow is one of the youngest central universities in the country. The jurisdiction of this residential university is over the entire state of Uttar Pradesh. The campus Vidya Vihar is located off Rae Bareli Road, about 10 km south of the Charbagh railway station in Lucknow. All courses offered by the university are postgraduate, innovative and non-traditional.

M.J.P. Rohilkhand University, established in 1975, has produced a large number of scholars and technocrats in various fields of the arts, science and technology; it has departments of management, engineering, the arts, science, law, education and technology. The university's Institute of Engineering and Technology was established in 1995, and it has a successful job-placement bureau throughout India for graduating students.

- Harish-Chandra Research Institute, Allahabad : Harish-Chandra Research Institute (HRI) is a research institution, named after the mathematician Harish-Chandra, and located in Allahabad, Uttar Pradesh. It is an autonomous institute, funded by the Department of Atomic Energy (DAE), Government of India.

The Govind Ballabh Pant Social Science Institute, Allahabad: Established in 1980 as one in the network of Social Science Research Institutes, which Indian Council of Social Science Research (ICSSR) set up in association with the State Governments, in G.B.Pant's case, the Government of Uttar Pradesh. The Institute undertakes interdisciplinary research in the field of social sciences. G.B.Pant Institute entered privileges of the University of Allahabad in 2005. Govind Ballabh Pant Social Science Institute became a Constituent Institute of the University of Allahabad on 14 July 2005, when the University of Allahabad Act, 2005 came into force.

The main areas of research at the Institute include development planning and policy, environment, health and population, human development, rural development and management, culture, power and change, democracy and institutions.

Institute offers a doctoral programme in social sciences and an MBA in rural development programme. In both programmes the degree is awarded by the University of Allahabad.

== See also ==
- Education in India
- List of educational institutions of Uttar Pradesh
