= Guru Jambheshwar University, Moradabad =

State university

- Motto: By knowledge, one attains immortality
- Type: State
- Established: 2025 (1 year ago)
- Affiliations: UGC
- Chancellor: Governor of Uttar Pradesh
- Vice-Chancellor: Prof. Sachin Maheshwari
- Location: Moradabad, Uttar Pradesh, India
- Website: gjum.ac.in

Guru Jambheshwar University, Moradabad is a state university located in the Camp Office Govt Polytechnic Campus Kanth Road Moradabad in Uttar Pradesh, India.

== History ==
In February 2023, the Government of Uttar Pradesh allocated ₹150 crore in its budget to establish three new universities in the state. These institutions were planned for the Vindhyachal, Devipatan, and Moradabad divisions. On 1 November 2023, the Uttar Pradesh Cabinet gave formal approval for the establishment of a state university in Moradabad.

The Chief Minister of Uttar Pradesh, Yogi Adityanath, laid the foundation stone for the Moradabad state university on 16 March 2024. During the ceremony, he also announced that the university would be named after Guru Jambheshwar, the founder of the Bishnoi community. According to local tradition, Guru Jambheshwar had arrived in Lodhipur Vishanpur town of Moradabad from Rajasthan 493 years ago, in 1587 AD (Vikram Samvat 1587). On 11 June 2024, the state government formally approved the university’s official name as Guru Jambheshwar University.

On 3 December 2024, Prof. Sachin Maheshwari was appointed as the first Vice Chancellor of the university. The University Grants Commission (UGC) granted recognition to the university on 27 March 2025, with the university’s establishment being retroactively acknowledged from 8 November 2023. The university’s official website and logo were unveiled on 14 July 2025.

The Guru Jambheshwar University now oversees all the colleges within the Moradabad division that were previously affiliated with MJP Rohilkhand University, Bareilly. A total of 372 colleges across the division are affiliated with the university, including 87 in Moradabad, 122 in Bijnor, 82 in Amroha, 37 in Rampur, and 44 in the Sambhal district.

The university commenced teaching from the academic session 2025-26.

== Campus ==
The university is presently functioning from a temporary campus at Govt Polytechnic, Kanth Road, Moradabad. Construction of the permanent campus of the university at Hardaspur, Moradabad began in June 2024. A Budget of Rs 299 Crore was allotted for construction of the permanent campus of the University.

== Faculties ==
The University offers academic courses through 74 schools, organized into 12 faculties:

Faculty	No of Schools	Schools
Faculty of Arts, Humanities, and Social Sciences	09	School of Hindi; School of Modern Indian Languages and Literature; School of International Languages and Literature; School of History & Heritage Studies; School of Geospatial Studies; School of Political Science and Governance; School of Strategic Studies and National Security; School of Disaster Resilience and Management; School of Family Sciences
Faculty of Creative and Performing Arts	04	School of Music and Sound Arts; School of Dance and Movement Arts; School of Theatre and Performing Arts; School of Traditional Crafts and Folk Arts
Faculty of Indian Knowledge Systems and Social Innovation	10	School of Indian Knowledge Systems; School of Linguistic Studies & Communication; School of Sanskrit & Indic Traditions; School of Persian, Arabic & Urdu Studies; School of Yoga and Holistic Practices; School of Philosophy, Ethics, and Culture; School of Policy Research & Governance; School of Media Studies & Communication; School of Behavioral Studies; School of Sociology
Faculty of Engineering Design and Technology	07	School of Computer and Information Engineering; School of Electronics and Communication Engineering; School of Mechanical and Automation Engineering; School of Instrumentation and Control Systems; School of Materials and Metallurgical Engineering; School of Product and Industrial Design; School of Applied Sciences for Engineering
Faculty of Applied Sciences and Technology	11	School of Statistical Science; School of Materials Science & Nanotechnology; School of Forensic Science & Criminology; School of Life Sciences & Microbiology; School of Computational Science & Applications; School of Bioinformatics & Computational Biology; School of Environmental Sustainability; School of Geophysics & Remote Sensing; School of Artificial Intelligence & Machine Learning; School of Earth & Planetary Sciences; School of Food Processing Technology & Nutrition Science
Faculty of Pharmaceutical Science & Pharmacy	02	School of Pharmaceutical Sciences; School of Pharmacy
Faculty of Commerce Economics and Business Studies	03	School of Economic Sciences; School of Financial Systems and Accounting Practices; School of Global Trade and International Business
Faculty of Management and Sustainable Development	07	School of Business and Strategic Management; School of Hotel and Hospitality Management; School of Forest and Environmental Management; School of Crop Sciences and Agronomy; School of Rural Industries and Sustainable Livelihoods; School of Spiritual and Eco-Tourism; School of Natural Resource Planning and Development
Faculty of Education & Pedagogical Sciences	05	School of Teacher Education & Development; School of Vocational & Skill-based Education; School of Physical Education & Sports Studies; School of Library & Information Studies; School of Inclusive Education
Faculty of Pure Sciences	06	School of Physical Sciences; School of Chemical Sciences; School of Earth Sciences; School of Mathematical Sciences; School of Botany and Plant Sciences; School of Zoology and Animal Biology
Faculty of Agriculture and Allied Sciences	08	School of Horticulture and Perennial Crops; School of Fisheries & Aquatic Sciences; School of Animal Husbandry and Dairy Technology; School of Crop Sciences and Agronomy; School of Plant Breeding and Genetics; School of Soil Science and Agrochemistry; School of Agricultural Economics, Policy, and Data Analytics; School of Plant Health and Pathology
Faculty of Legal Studies	02	School of Law and Justice; School of Jurisprudence and Legal Innovation
