= Jaisi =

Jaisi or Jayasi is a toponymic surname from Jais (formerly Jayas) in northern India. Notable people with the name include:

- Kabir Ahmad Jaisi (1934–2013), Indian writer
- Malik Muhammad Jayasi (1477–1542), Indian poet who wrote in the Avadhi language
