= City Vocational Public School =

Location
- 250, Circular Road; Meerut, Uttar Pradesh 250001; India
- 29°00′10″N 77°41′15″E

Information
- Type: Private
- Motto: "Learn To Shine"
- Established: 1990
- Founder: Lt. Chandra Sen Agarwal
- Status: Open
- School board: CBSE
- Chairperson: Sarojini Agarwal
- Director: O. P. Agarwal
- Principal: N. P. Singh
- Teaching staff: 125
- Grades: Nur-12
- Gender: Co-educational
- Enrollment: 3042
- Language: English
- Campus: Urban
- Campus size: 5.93 acres
- Houses: Aravali, Nilgiri, Shivalik, Vindhya
- Affiliation: Central Board of Secondary Education, Dehradun
- Website: www.cvpschool.com

City Vocational Public School is an English-medium, private, senior secondary school in Meerut Cantonment, India. It is co-educational non-boarding school affiliated to the Central Board of Secondary Education (CBSE).

== History ==
Late Shri Chandra Sen Agarwal, retired Joint Director of Education U.P. and Ex-Secretary, Board of High and Intermediate Education, U.P. Allahabad, laid the foundation of this institution in the year 1990. He was the director of the school at the start. The first principal of the school Mr. P.N Raina served as the principal for a short period till around 1991 . From 1992 onwards, Smt Suman Khare was the principal of City vocational public school. The first batch of class 10 students passed out in the year 1995 - the same year that Smt Suman khare died due to illness. The school initially stated functioning from the campus of today's Meerut Institute of Engineering and Technology.

== Campus ==
School is located in quiet surroundings of Meerut Cantonment. The school campus is spread in an area of 23,998 m^{2} (5.93 acres) with 2 playground, 115 rooms, 12 labs and 2 libraries. It also have 10 Digital Classrooms with wifi facility.

== Affiliation and examination ==
The school is affiliated to the Central Board of Secondary Education, Delhi. It is also a center for CBSE board examinations.

== Academics ==
=== Results ===
Passing percentage (percentage of students passing the examination) for board examinations are as follows:

Passing percentages
Year	10th	12th
2014	99.2%	90%
2015	98.0%	84.46%
2016	97.3%	85.0%
2017	-	-

== Extracurricular activities ==
The School has facility to support an array of sports activities like cricket, basketball, badminton, table tennis, volleyball. The school also has a dedicated cricket academy with practice nets. Students are grouped into four houses, Aravali, Nilgiri, Shivalik and Vindhya, named after mountain ranges of India. Inter house activities like quizzes, debates and cultural functions are organized throughout the session to promote healthy competition. An annual sports week is organized where every house's performance is recorded for the overall championship. As a part of co-curricular events are organized from time to time providing an opportunity for students to showcase their talent.

In December 2015, school's cricket team won the 6th All India Hema Kohli Cricket Tournament by defeating Karan Public School in the final. It has participated and won in various other tournaments in the past.

Schools's Basket Ball team is also an active participant in various district and state-level tournaments.

== Awards and recognition ==
- Public Choice Awards 2016: CVPS was voted 1st in category: 'Public Choice Award 2016 - School of Excellence' for the city of Meerut.

== Criticism ==
In 2015, the school, among other private schools in the district, came under media criticism for being autocratic in determining various fees and commissions on books, dress etc.

In 2017, the school among various other schools, was accused of not prescribing NCERT books in its curriculum which is against the CBSE norm. CBSE sent a notice to the school and sought clarification in this regard with a provision of penalizing in case of failure to justify. This led to the school administration publishing a list of books prescribed in the curriculum for classes 1 to 12 on their website.

== See also ==
- List of educational institutions in Meerut
