= Ganga Nagar, Meerut =

Ganga Nagar, Meerut Up Government
- Suburb
- Country: India
- State: Uttar Pradesh
- District: Meerut
- Founder: MDA (Meerut Development Authority

Government
  - Body: Ganga Nagar Police Station

Population
  - Total: 80,000

Languages
  - Official: Hindi
- Time zone: UTC+5:30 (IST)
- PIN: 250 001
- Vehicle registration: UP-15
- Nearest city: Meerut
- Literacy: -%
- Lok Sabha constituency: Meerut
- Vidhan Sabha constituency: Meerut Cantt
- Civic agency: Ganga Nagar Nagar Police Station
- Website: meerut.nic.in

Ganga Nagar is a neighbourhood in the northeast part of Meerut, Uttar Pradesh. This neighbourhood was named after the Ganges river. It is surrounded by the Defence colony and Awho colony Meerut cantt to the south, Buxar village to the north, and Abdullahpur to the east. Ganga Nagar is approximately 10 km from Meerut City railway station and approximately 5 km from Meerut Cantt railway station.

== Education ==
It is home to educational institutes such as IIMT University, The Avenue Public School, International Public school, and Gargi girls school, while also being close to JP Hotel management college, Forte Institute and Translam Academy.

== Economy ==
In last few years, Ganga nagar is emerged as a youth hub of Meerut as there are so many multinationals cafes, fast food outlets are situated and growing in the area. Branches of banks such as State Bank of India, Punjab National Bank, UCO Bank, ICICI Bank, Syndicate Bank and Axis Bank, along with the UP West Regional Office of Airtel and BSNL. Super Market Retail Chains like Vishal Mega mart, Reliance are also here.

== Transport ==
Meerut Metro phase 3 is also planned to cover Ganga Nagar with 3 Stations.

== Ganga Nagar Extension ==
In 2017, after a verdict in their favour in the Supreme Court, the Meerut Development Corporation decided to start the development of 200 acres of Ganga Nagar Extension after a survey. Earlier, demanding a higher price as compensation for their land, the farmers protested and after MDC failed to yield, they moved the court.

In August 1987, the farmers of Ganga Nagar were paid an amount of Rs.201 per sq. yard while other colonies got just Rs 165 per sq yard. However, after protests by Shatabdi Nagar farmers, a higher amount was paid to them in 2011. In 2015, the protests increased. So Ganga Nagar farmers too demanded the same but failed to get it.
