= Durgadutta Chunnilal Sagar Mal Post Graduate College, Mau =

Educational institute in Uttar Pradesh

Coordinates: 25.93°N 83.56°E

Durgadutta Chunnilal Sagarmal Khandelwal Post Graduate College, Mau
- Established: 1964
- Affiliations: Maharaja Suhel Dev State University, Azamgarh Uttar Pradesh.
- Principal: Prof. Sharvesh Pandey
- Location: Mau, Uttar Pradesh, India
- Campus: Urban
- Website: www.dcskmau.com

Durgadutta Chunnilal Sagarmal Khandelwal Post Graduate College or Simply DCSK is an educational institution in Mau of Uttar Pradesh state in India.

== Departments ==
The departments offering courses include:

- Physics
- Chemistry
- Mathematics
- Zoology
- Botany
- Journalism and Mass Communicating
- Economics
- Political Science
- History
- Geography
- Sociology
- Psychology
- Education
- English
- Hindi
- Urdu
- Sanskrit

== See also ==
- List of universities in India
- Universities and colleges in India
- Education in India
- Distance Education Council
- University Grants Commission (India)
