= Monad University =

Private university in Uttar Pradesh

Coordinates: 28.7216°N 77.6962°E

- Type: Private
- Established: 2010
- Affiliations: UGC
- Vice-Chancellor: virender singh
- Location: Hapur, Uttar Pradesh, India
- Website: www.monad.edu.in
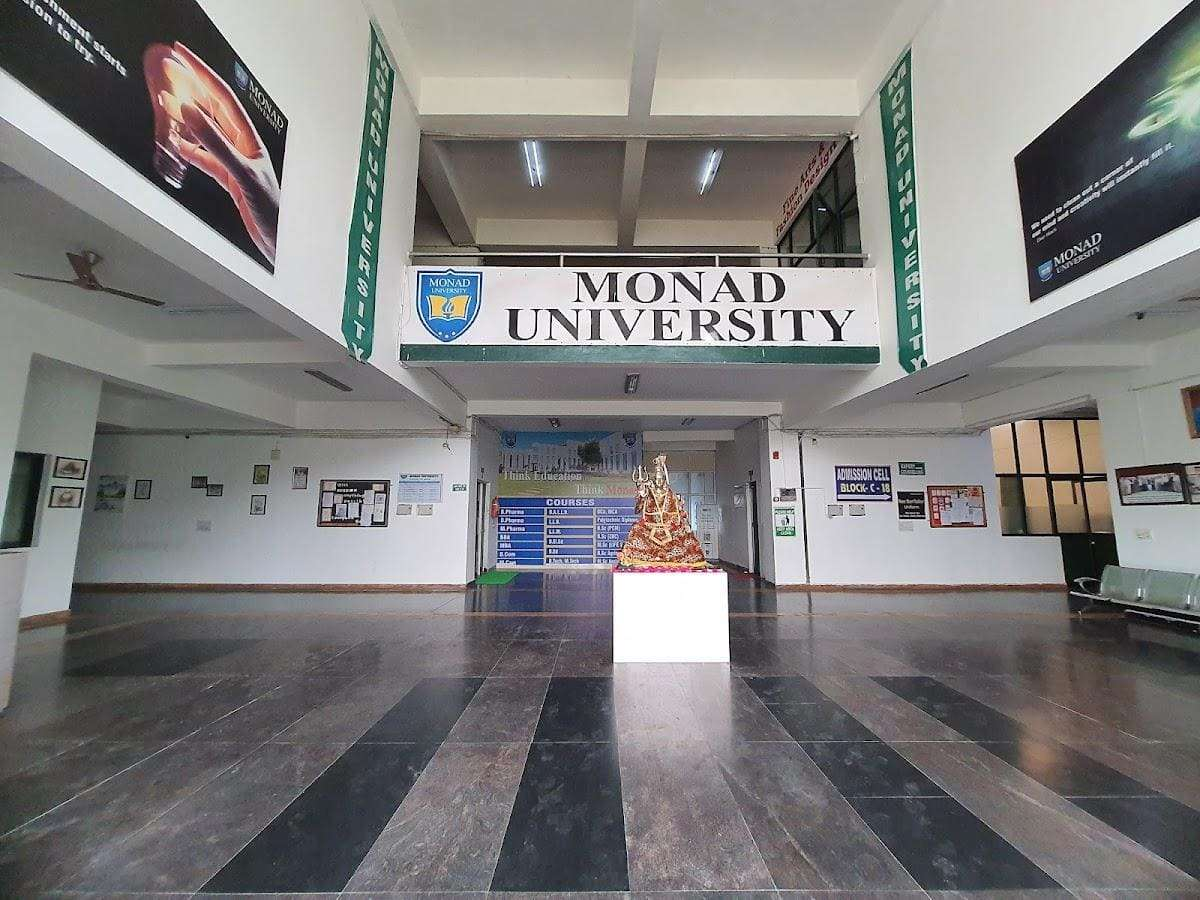

Monad University is a private university located in NCR region, Hapur, Uttar Pradesh. It offers various courses in field of engineering, sciences, Education, pharmacy, law etc.
