= Rajiv Gandhi Institute of Petroleum Technology =

Public university in Raebareli under IIT kanpur

- Motto in English: Education is the ultimate wealth
- Type: Public engineering school
- Established: 2007; 19 years ago
- Endowment: ₹17.7 billion (US$180 million) all campuses
- President: A. B. Pandit
- Director: Harish Hirani
- Academic staff: 102
- Administrative staff: 45
- Undergraduates: 2121
- Postgraduates: 85
- Doctoral students: 223
- Location: Jais, Amethi, Uttar Pradesh, India; 26.2648064°N 81.5054372°E
- Campus: Rural
- Website: www.rgipt.ac.in

Rajiv Gandhi Institute of Petroleum Technology (RGIPT), in Jais, Amethi (formerly in Raebareli), Uttar Pradesh, India, is a research and education institute focusing on STEM and petroleum industry. It is an institute of national importance equivalent to IITs. It was formally opened in July 2008.

It has been accorded the Institute of National Importance status and a governance structure similar to that available to IITs It admits undergraduate students from the rank list of students who have qualified for Joint Entrance Examination – Advanced (JEE Advanced) Examination.

== History ==
Former Prime Minister Manmohan Singh laying foundation stone of RGIPT Assam Campus

- 4 Jul 2007: The Union Cabinet approved the setting up of the Rajiv Gandhi Institute of Petroleum Technology at Jais in Amethi District of UP.
- 29 Nov 2007: The Rajya Sabha passed the Rajiv Gandhi Institute of Petroleum Technology (RGIPT) Bill 2007.
- 3 Dec 2007: The Lok Sabha passed the Rajiv Gandhi Institute of Petroleum Technology (RGIPT) Bill 2007.
- 20 Feb 2008: Congress President and UPA Chairperson Sonia Gandhi lays foundation stone of Rajiv Gandhi Institute of Petroleum Technology at Jais.
- 2008–2009: Start of academic session.
- 2011: Former Prime Minister of India Manmohan Singh laid the foundations of the Rajiv Gandhi Institute of Petroleum Technology (Assam centre).
- 2012: First BTech batch passes out.
- 2013: Bangalore centre gets approved.
- 2014: Veerappa Moily, former Minister of Petroleum and Natural Gas inaugurates Rajiv Gandhi Institute of Petroleum Technology at Kambali Pura Village, Hoskote Taluk, Bangalore District.
- 2015: First Convocation was conducted with Minister of Petroleum and Natural Gas Dharmendra Pradhan and other high level dignitaries from Ministry of Petroleum and Natural Gas as Chief Guests.
- 2016: Institute is moved to the permanent campus at Jais.
- 22 Oct 2016: Union ministers, Minister of Textiles Shrimati Smriti Irani, Minister of Petroleum and Natural Gas Shri Dharmendra Pradhan and Minister of Human Resource Development Shri Prakash Javadekar, inaugurated the permanent campus at Jais.
- May 2017: The institute increases the student intake for BTech program to 120 seats from 75 seats.
- 13 May 2017: Chief Minister of Assam Sarbananda Sonowal and Minister of Petroleum and Natural Gas Shri Dharmendra Pradhan jointly launched the full swing construction work of second campus at Sivasagar, Assam.
- Dec 2017: Sivasagar campus starts academic sessions for diploma in petroleum and chemical streams.
- Sept 2018: Bangalore Campus starts academic sessions for 3 MTech courses in the fields of Renewable Energy, Power and Energy Systems Engineering and Energy Science and Technology.

== RGIPT and its Centers ==
=== Main (Old & New) campus ===
- The institute started functioning from a leased land from Feroze Gandhi Institute of Engineering and Technology at Rae Bareli as academic center and ITI Township as Residential center for almost 9 years. On 15 October 2016, the institute was moved to a 47-acre newly constructed permanent campus at Jais, Uttar Pradesh. The infrastructure is not completely finished, but is expected to complete in 5 years.
- The new campus is a state-of-the-art campus with air conditioned classrooms having projectors, high definition televisions, computers for the faculty, video conferencing equipment. LAN connectivity has been provided in each room including hostel, classrooms along with permanent WI-FI setup has been provided.

=== RGIPT Jais, Amethi ===
- Started academic sessions in June 2008 at a temporary campus at Rae Bareli. On 15 October 2016, the institute moved from temporary campus to the permanent campus at Jais.
- This campus offers the BTech, MTech, MBA, PhD programs and other research related activities. The cost for setting up this campus was ₹8.61 billion (US$89 million).
- From 2020 onwards, The Institute began offering BTech Courses in Computer Science Engineering and Electronics Engineering.
- In the year 2021, a new four year B.Tech. programme in Mathematics & Computing has been started at RGIPT with the goal of setting the stage for developing skills in mathematics and computer science.

=== RGIPT Sivasagar Campus, Assam ===
- Started academic sessions in 2017 at Sivasagar, Assam in 37 acres as a first phase while 63 acres is under construction.
- On 13 May 2017, Chief Minister of Assam Sarbananda Sonowal and Minister of Petroleum and Natural Gas Shri Dharmendra Pradhan jointly launched the full swing construction work of second campus at Sivasagar, Assam. This campus is being built at a cost of ₹8.801 billion (US$91 million).

=== RGIPT Bengaluru Campus, Karnataka (center of RGIPT) ===
- Third campus of RGIPT is in Bengaluru.
- In July 2013, Karnataka government agreed to offer 150 acres of land to set up the Bangalore centre which is going to be Asia's first centre on fire and safety for oil and gas sector. The Bengaluru Campus is currently offering 04 M.Tech. programmes namely M.Tech. in Renewable Energy, Energy Science and Technology, Power and Energy Systems Engineering & Electric Vehicle Technology and PhD programmes in all disciplines of Engineering specifically in the field of Energy. The institute has commenced its academical activities from its transit campus at NMIT Bangalore from 2018.
- This campus would initially house 10 research labs established over 1.8 lakh square feet in a research cum academic complex. An Energy Experience Centre, Incubation/E-Cell, Library, Auditorium and Seminar Halls etc. will support the activities of the campus. The institute coming up will cost ₹18 billion (US$190 million).

== Organisation and administration ==
=== Departments at RGPT Jais ===
RGIPT has the following departments:

- Department of Chemical and Biochemical Engineering
- Department of Computer Science and Engineering
- Department of Mechanical Engineering
- Department of Electrical and Electronics Engineering
- Department of Management Studies
- Department of Mathematical Sciences
- Department of Petroleum Engineering and Geoengineering
- Department of Science and Humanities

=== Campuses ===
- RGIPT Jais Campus, Uttar Pradesh
- RGIPT Sivasagar Campus, Assam
- RGIPT Bengaluru Campus, Karnataka

=== Budget ===
Union ministers inaugurating RGIPT's Campus

==== Jais Campus ====
The total estimated capital cost: ₹ 861 crores (₹ 416 crores (Central Exchequer) + ₹ 250 crores (GOI) + ₹ 150 crores (Oil Industry Development Board) + ₹ 45 crores (Institute itself)) The institute's permanent campus infrastructure was provided with ₹ 129 crores during Congress led UPA government and additional ₹ 302 crores were provided by the current NDA government for completion of campus. During fiscal 2016–17, Ministry of Petroleum and Natural Gas has allocated additional ₹ 47 crores while the institute remains independent to generate more funds for operational purposes through college fees and other funds/awards.

==== Sivasagar Campus ====
The Detailed Project Report has stated the cost for setting up and running Sivasagar campus will be ₹8.801 billion (US$91 million) in which ₹3.96 billion (US$41 million) will be for spent for land acquisition and construction of facilities and ₹4.83 billion (US$50 million) for running the institute.

==== Bengaluru Campus ====
The Detailed Project Report has stated the cost for setting up and running Bangalore campus will be ₹18 billion (US$190 million) in which ₹8 billion (US$83 million) will be for spent for land acquisition and construction of facilities and ₹10 billion (US$100 million) for research related activities. It one of the most expensive research institutes in India.

== Academics ==
=== Admissions ===
- The institute admits B Tech students from the rank list of qualified students in the JEE Advanced Examination and M Tech through GATE.
- For MBA, institute admits candidates from qualification through CAT/XAT/CMAT/GMAT/MAT score.
- For admission to PhD programmes, candidates must have a valid scorecard of: GRE/NET (UGC/CSIR)/NBHM/ DBT/ GPAT/ Rajiv Gandhi National Fellowship/ Maulana Azad National Fellowship/ DST Inspire Award or any similar Fellowship.

=== Rankings ===
University rankings

Engineering – India
- NIRF (2022): 182
- NIRF (2023): 79
- NIRF (2024): 80

The National Institutional Ranking Framework (NIRF) ranked it 78 among engineering colleges in 2025.

=== Academic programmes ===
Location of the RGIPT Campuses
- RGIPT offers courses in engineering, sciences, management and humanities with a focus on petroleum engineering. The programs and courses offered at RGIPT are changing as the school evolving into a full-fledged petroleum engineering university.
- Admission to the courses of BTech is done from candidates appearing for JEE Advanced Examination.
- Admission to the MTech courses are done through the Graduate Aptitude Test in Engineering (GATE).
- Admissions to the MBA program is done through the Common Admission Test (CAT). Interviewing cities are Delhi, Mumbai, Bangalore, Kolkata, Lucknow and Jais.
- Admissions to the MSc.Tech. and PhD courses are done through examinations conducted by the institute at Jais.
- Entrance examination is held at Sivasagar campus for all diploma engineering courses.

Degree	Specialization	Campus
Bachelor of Technology (BTech)	Chemical Engineering; Chemical Engineering (Major: Renewable Energy Engineering); Computer Science and Engineering; Computer Science & Design Engineering; Electronics Engineering; Electrical Engineering (Major: EV Technology); Information Technology; Mathematics & Computing; Mechanical Engineering; Petroleum Engineering	Jais Campus
Master of Science (M.Sc.)	Geosciences; Sustainable Energy	Jais Campus
Master of Business Administration	MBA; MBA in Business Analytics; MBA in Energy Transition (for working professionals)	Bengaluru Campus
Diploma	Chemical Engineering; Fire and Safety Engineering; Mechanical Engineering; Electronics and Instrumentation Engineering; Petroleum Engineering	Sivasagar Campus
PhD	All allied disciplines of Science, Engineering, Management and Humanities	RGPT
PhD	Electrical and Electronics Engineering; Mechanical Engineering; Material Science and Engineering	Bengaluru Campus

Main Hostel Building

== Student life ==
=== Energia ===
This is an annual festival of three days of activities including sporting events, talent playoffs and similar activities. It was separated from the annual cultural festival in 2017 and since then, sporting events are held in this festival. Sawai godara is the current Energy Chief and prime person behind sport activities in the college In 2019, this event marked its third anniversary as sports were part of annual cultural fest since the beginning of the institute. This festival is currently financed by the institute while some of the amount is fetched by sponsorship.

=== Kaltarang ===
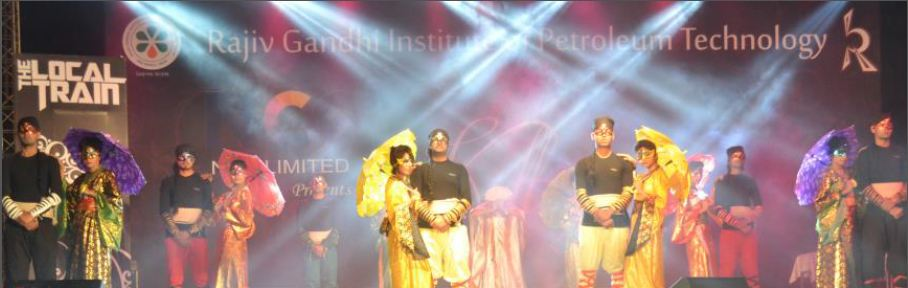

Kaltarang is the annual cultural and sports fest of Rajiv Gandhi Institute of Petroleum Technology, Amethi. It is a themed fest, generally held in the month of February every year, since the very first time in 2011. It is a three-day fest having events like rock band performance, fashion show, rock band competition, stand-up comedy, cyber gaming, themed events, various sports events.

== See also ==
- List of autonomous higher education institutes in India
