= Shri Ramswaroop Memorial University =

Private university in Barabanki

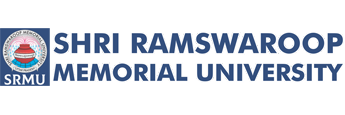
- University Logo
- Other name: SRMU
- Motto: Chase reality, dreams will follow
- Type: Private university
- Established: 2012; 14 years ago
- Affiliations: UGC
- Chancellor: Er. Pankaj Agarwal
- Pro-Chancellor: Er. Pooja Agarwal
- Academic staff: 240
- Students: 10,000+ (2025)
- Location: Barabanki, Uttar Pradesh, India
- Campus: Urban
- Colours: White, navy blue
- Nickname: Ramswaroopians
- Mascot: Gillu
- Website: srmu.ac.in

Shri Ramswaroop Memorial University (SRMU) is a private university established under the Uttar Pradesh Private Universities Act, located on Lucknow-Deva Road, Barabanki, Uttar Pradesh, India. As of 2026, the university enrols more than 10,000 students across 100+ academic programmes.

The university was established in 2012 under UP State Govt. ACT 1. It holds recognition from the University Grants Commission (UGC) and the All India Council of Technical Education (AICTE). SRMU is a member of the Association of Indian Universities (AIU). It offers courses approved by the Council of Architecture (COI), National Council for Teacher Education (NCTE), Pharmacy Council of India (PCI), and Bar Council of India (BCI).

== Campus ==
SRMU is situated on Lucknow-Deva Road in Barabanki district, approximately 25 kilometres from Lucknow. The campus houses academic blocks, specialised laboratories, a central library, sports infrastructure, and separate hostel facilities.

== Academics and Industry Partnerships ==
The university offers more than 100 programmes across engineering, management, law, agriculture, and pharmacy. It has established industry-integrated "Honours Programmes" in collaboration with Larsen & Toubro (L&T), covering fields like Cyber Security, Data Science, and Electric Vehicle (EV) Engineering.

Other academic partners include Tata Motors, IBM, and the Uttar Pradesh Government Skill Development Mission.

== Research and Intellectual Property ==
As of 2026, SRMU's research output includes:

- Over 150 patents granted or published.
- More than 1,200 research papers in peer-reviewed journals.
- Over ₹3 crore in external research and consultancy funding.

== Placements ==
The university's Training and Placement Cell facilitates recruitment with over 250 organisations annually. Notable recruiters include Morgan Stanley. The university reports a sector-specific placement rate of approximately 90% in Biotechnology, Engineering, and Management.

== Rankings and Recognition ==
Shri Ramswaroop Memorial University has received recognition in several national surveys. In 2026, it was ranked 15th among the top private universities in India by India Today. The university has also been featured in the QS Asia University Rankings and has been rated for its academic performance by Shiksha.

The university was also awarded as the "Best Innovative University" by ASSOCHAM and highlighted for its career insights and educational events.
