= Jais =

Town in Uttar Pradesh, India

Jais Jayas
- Town
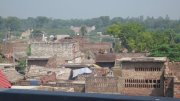

- Location in India Jais (India)
- Coordinates: 26.25°N 81.53°E
- Country: India
- State: Uttar Pradesh
- Division: Ayodhya
- District: Amethi
- Founder: Hazrat Meer Imaduddin Qilchi

Government
  - Type: Municipal Council
  - Body: Jais Municipal Council
  - Municipal Chairperson: Manisha (INC)
- Elevation: 101 m (331 ft)

Population (2011)
  - Total: 26,735

Language
  - Official: Hindi
  - Additional official: Urdu
- Time zone: UTC+5:30 (IST)
- Postal code: 229305
- Telephone code: STD code 5313
- Vehicle registration: UP-36

Jais, also spelled Jayas, is a city with a municipal board in Amethi district (formerly in Raebareli district) in the Indian state of Uttar Pradesh.

== Geography ==
Jais is located at 26.25°N 81.53°E. It has an average elevation of 101 metres (331 feet).

== Demographics ==
As of 2011 Indian census, Jais has a population of 26,735 people. Males constitute 52% of the population and females 48%. Jais' literacy rate is 62.42%, lower than the national average of 67.68%. Male literacy is 70% and female literacy is 54.54%. In Jais, 13.39% of the population is under six years of age.

== Transport ==
Jais has two railway stations on the Indian Railways network: Bahadurpur and Kasimpur. The bus station is at Sultanpur-Raebareli road. The nearest airport Fursatganj Airfield is 19.3 km away, and the nearest international airport Ayodhya Airport is 70 km away.

== Education ==
=== Institute of National Importance ===
Rajiv Gandhi Institute of Petroleum Technology

The Ministry of Petroleum and Natural Gas set up the Rajiv Gandhi Institute of Petroleum Technology at Jais. It has been accorded "Institute of National Importance" status and a governance structure similar to that available to IITs. It admits undergraduate students from the rank list of students who have qualified JEE (Advanced) Examination.

== Notable people ==
- Malik Mohammad Jayasi, a poet who wrote Padmavat and Akhravat. In Padmavat Jayasi expresses his deep reverence to Chishti Sufi Master Syed Ashraf Jahangir Semnani and his descendants. Jayasi Samarak (Jaisi Memorial) has been constructed in his memory.
- Syed Sibtey Razi, former Governor of Jharkhand. He is a senior leader of the Indian National Congress and has served in the Government of India and Uttar Pradesh in various capacities.
- Leela Mishra, film actress, notable for playing the role of Mausi in the Bollywood classic Sholay.

=== Sadaat of Jais ===
The Oudh family of Sayyids of Jais, well known for Mujtahids of Lucknow, settled in Rae Bareli during the thirteenth century.

== See also ==
- Jaisi
- Jaiswal
