= Dr. A. P. J. Abdul Kalam Technical University, Lucknow =

State government university in India

Dr. A.P.J. Abdul Kalam Technical University
- Former names: Uttar Pradesh Technical University; Gautam Buddh Technical University; Mahamaya Technical University
- Motto in English: Excellence in action is yoga
- Type: State Government University
- Established: 26 July 2000 (26 years ago)
- Accreditation: National Assessment and Accreditation Council (NAAC A)
- Affiliations: UGC, AICTE
- Chancellor: Governor of Uttar Pradesh
- Vice-Chancellor: J. P. Pandey
- Location: Lucknow, Uttar Pradesh, India; 26.9443029°N 80.9396275°E
- Campus: Urban
- Language: English, Hindi
- Colors
- Website: aktu.ac.in

Dr. A.P.J. Abdul Kalam Technical University (AKTU), before 2015 known as the Uttar Pradesh Technical University (UPTU), is a public collegiate university in Lucknow, Uttar Pradesh, India. It was established as the Uttar Pradesh Technical University through the Government of Uttar Pradesh on 8 May 2000. To reduce workload and to ensure proper management, the university was bifurcated into separate universities, Gautam Buddh Technical University (GBTU) and Mahamaya Technical University (MTU), with effect from 1 May 2010. In 2013, as a new government came into power, the university was formed again by combining the two on 5 January 2013.

It is an affiliating university, with approximately 800 colleges affiliated to it. The university was earlier on the IET Lucknow campus. Now it is in its newly inaugurated campus in Jankipuram, Lucknow. Additionally, the university had a Centre and Regional Office in Noida, Uttar Pradesh.

== History ==
Dr. A.P.J. Abdul Kalam Technical University, Lucknow formerly known as Uttar Pradesh Technical University (UPTU), was established by the government of Uttar Pradesh on 8 May 2000 (Act No. 1248 (2)XVII-V-I-I-19-2000 Uttar Pradesh Adhiniyam Sankhya 23 of 2000). Under the University Act, 'Technical Education' includes programmes of education, research, and training in engineering, technology, architecture, town planning, pharmacy, applied arts and crafts, and such other programmes and areas that the central government may declare by notification in the Gazette in consultation with All India Council for Technical Education (AICTE).

The university was bifurcated into the Mahamaya Technical University and Gautam Buddha Technical University as of 1 May 2010 for better management of education in the state. On 1 May 2013, the Uttar Pradesh government decided to merge GBTU and MTU to bring back the original form of UPTU. On 31 October 2013, GBTU (Gautam Buddha Technical University, Lucknow) and MTU (Mahamaya Technical University, Noida) merged back to with old name UPTU (Uttar Pradesh Technical University, Lucknow), the university with the maximum number of colleges affiliated to it, in India. On 18 September 2015, the university was officially renamed as Dr. A.P.J. Abdul Kalam Technical University.

== Overview ==
The university is affiliating in nature and its jurisdiction spanned the state of Uttar Pradesh. It is one of the largest technical universities in India and perhaps in Asia. Because of its size, the number of colleges affiliated with it, and geographic dispersion, it is sub-divided into five zones with 150–160 colleges in each zone for the ease of management and facilitating inter-zonal comparison and possible internal competition to enhance the quality of teaching-learning processes.

The university envisioned to facilitate and nurture quality technical education and research in its own premises as well as all affiliated institutions. There were 49 affiliated colleges in 2000, now in August 2019, 785 colleges and institutions. The task of the university included conducting the SEE-UPTU for admission to programs affiliated with it. The university conducted central examinations each semester for all the affiliated colleges and institutions. Results were declared using technology-enabled systems. At present, in August 2019 around 4,00,000 students are enrolled in its programmes. The medium of instruction and examination is English.

As per a dipstick study conducted by MeritTrac in association with UPTU Watch magazine (2011), the engineering talent pool of the university was found to be significantly better than the national average.

== Colleges ==
=== Constituent Colleges ===
- Institute of Engineering and Technology
- Faculty of Architecture and Planning
- Centre for Advanced Studies, Lucknow
- U.P. Institute of Design, Noida

=== Formerly affiliated institutions ===
- Motilal Nehru National Institute of Technology (2000 to 2002)
- Madan Mohan Malaviya University of Technology (2000 to 2013)
- Harcourt Butler Technical University (2000 to 2016)
- Jauhar College of Engineering and Technology (2010 to 2014)
- Pharmacy College Saifai (2015 to 2016)

== Courses and rankings ==
The university offers undergraduate courses in engineering, architecture, hotel management and catering technology, fashion and apparel design, and pharmacy. These lead to degrees of B.Tech, B.Arch, BHMCT, BFAD, and B.Pharma respectively. The university offers postgraduate courses in computer applications and business administration leading to degrees of MCA, MBA and MBA (Rural Development). The university received its lowest number of applications in 2016, lowest in past 5 years. The university offers training and placement support to affiliated colleges and institutes through the University industry interface cell (UIIC).

Dr. A.P.J. Abdul Kalam Technical University (AKTU) is accredited by the NAAC with an 'A' grade. The university is approved by the UGC and the AICTE. Many of the affiliated institutes under AKTU have secured NBA (National Board of Accreditation) accreditations for their engineering, pharmacy, and management programs.

== Notable alumni ==
List of notable people who studied at Dr. A.P.J. Abdul Kalam Technical University, Lucknow.

- Sudhanshu Trivedi, MP
- Praveen Kumar Nishad, former MP
- Yasar Shah, former MLA
- Abdullah Azam Khan, former MLA
- Swati Maliwal, MP and women's rights activist
- Arun Verma, former MLA
- Utkarsh Verma, MP
- Kumudini Tyagi, Indian aviator
- Vinay Kumar Pathak, Vice Chancellor Chhatrapati Shahu Ji Maharaj University, Uttarakhand Open University, Vardhaman Mahaveer Open University and Dr. A.P.J. Abdul Kalam Technical University
- Shishir Dua Electronic Arts, GlobalLogic, Hitachi
- Reecha Sinha, actress
- Prachi Mishra, actress
- Srijan Pal Singh, Author
- Ruchita Misra, Author

== Vice-chancellors ==
- Durg Singh Chauhan (July 2000 to July 2006)
- R. K. Mittal (July 2006 to July 2006)
- Prem Vrat (July 2006 to July 2009)
- Kripa Shanker (July 2009 to September 2012)
- R.K. Khandal (September 2012 to April 2015)
- Onkar Singh (April 2015 to August 2015)
- Vinay Kumar Pathak (August 2015 to August 2021)
- Vineet Kansal (August 2021 to January 2022)
- Pradeep Kumar Mishra (January 2022 to February 2023)
- Alok Kumar Rai (February 2023 to May 2023)
- J. P. Pandey (May 2023 to Present)

== See also ==
- Ghanshyam Binani
