= Ghanshyam =

Ghanshyam is an Indian masculine given name.

== Notable people ==
- Krishna, another name.
- Swaminarayan, founder of Swaminarayan Sampraday, born as Ghanshyam Pande.
- Ghanshyam Anuragi, politician.
- Ghanshyam Binani (1932-1998), industrialist.
- Ghanshyam Chandravanshi, politician.
- Ghanshyam Dass, politician.
- Ghanshyam Desai, writer.
- Ghanshyam Singh Lodhi, politician.
- Ghanshyam Mahar, politician.
- Ghanshyam Oza (1911-2002), politician.
- Ghanshyam Patidar (died 2019), politician.
- Ghanshyam Saraf, politician.
- Ghanshyam Sarda, businessman
- Ghanshyam Tiwari, politician from Bihar.
- Ghanshyam Tiwari, politician from Rajasthan.
- Ghanshyam Swarup, molecular biologist.
