= Onkar Singh =

Professor of mechanical engineering

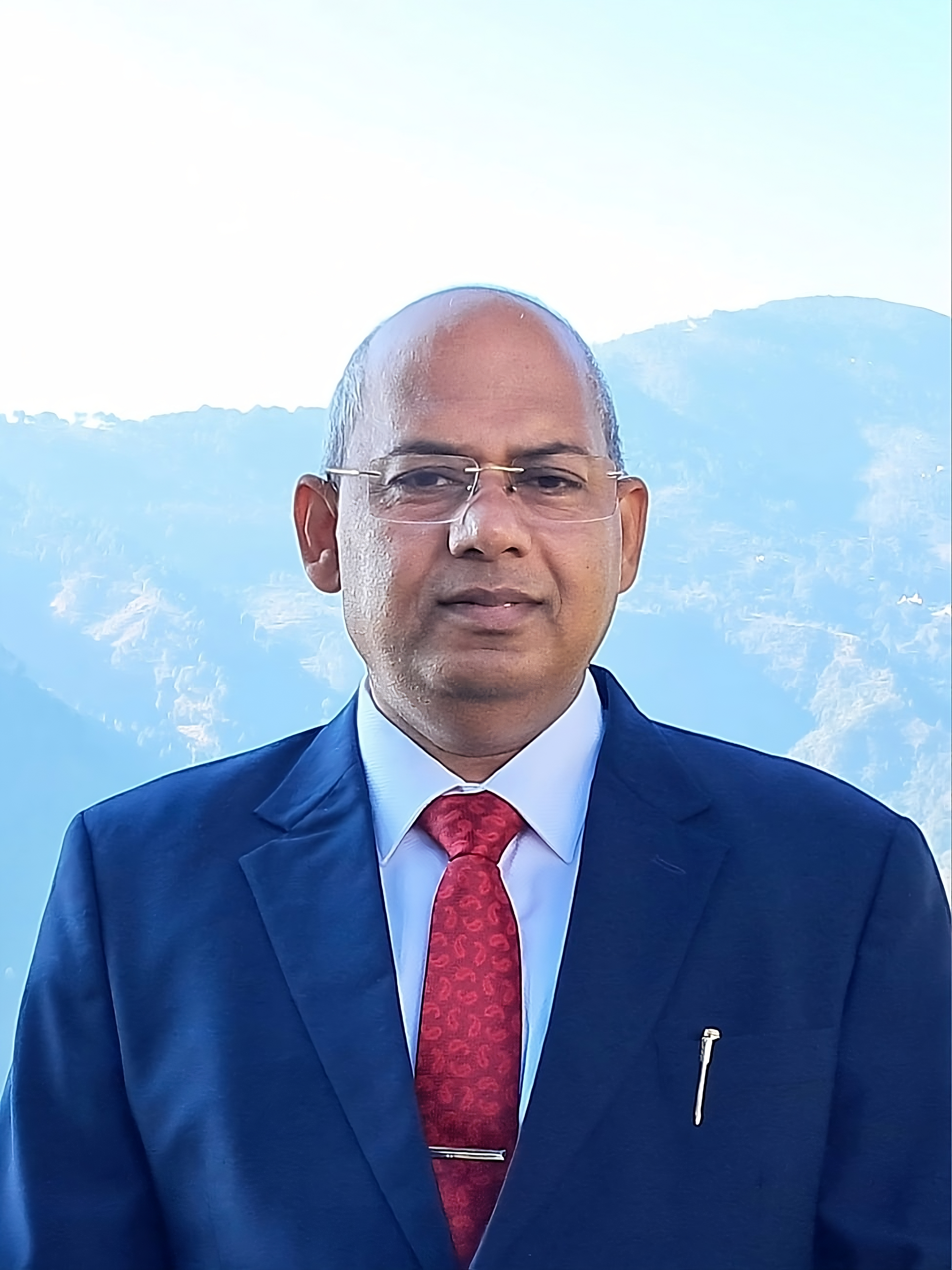
- Born: 8 October 1968 (age 58); Kanpur, Uttar Pradesh, India
- Occupation: Professor
- Years active: 1991 – present
- Title: Professor
- Spouse: Parvin
- Children: Sneha, Prateek
- Awards: AICTE Young Teacher Career Award (2000) National Record for development of air turbine engine for running motor bike – LIMCA Book of Records (2014) National Record for First academics’ work in US school text book – LIMCA Book of Records (2015) 100 Most Influential Vice Chancellors Award (2016) Asia's Education Excellence Award (2016) Honorary Fellowship-2020 of Indian Society for Technical Education New Delhi Sherpa Kulpati of India - 2023 Global Visionary Award - Collaborative Visionary Award for Exceptional Leadership in Educational Enhancement (2024) Vice Chancellor of the Year Award (2024)

Academic background
- Education: Harcourt Butler Technological Institute, Kanpur University (B.Tech.); Motilal Nehru Regional Engineering College, University of Allahabad (M.E., Ph.D.)
- Doctoral advisor: Dr. R. Yadav

Academic work
- Discipline: Thermodynamics, Turbomachinery, IC Engines, Refrigeration
- Institutions: Institute of Engineering and Technology; Uttar Pradesh Technical University; Madan Mohan Malaviya University of Technology; Harcourt Butler Technical University; Uttarakhand Technical University
- Website: http://dronkarsingh.in/

Onkar Singh (born 8 October 1968) is an Indian Professor of Mechanical Engineering and Ex Vice Chancellor of Veer Madho Singh Bhandari Uttarakhand Technical University, Dehradun. He has been the founder Vice-Chancellor of Madan Mohan Malaviya University of Technology, former Vice-Chancellor of Hemwati Nandan Bahuguna Uttarakhand Medical Education University, Dehradun, Veer Chandra Singh Garhwali Uttarakhand University of Horticulture and Forestry, Pauri Garhwal, Tehri Garhwal, and Uttar Pradesh Technical University.

== Early life and education ==
Singh was born in Kanpur, Uttar Pradesh. His father was a retired Indian Air Force personnel. Dr. Singh is a native of Unnao district of Uttar Pradesh.

Singh did his B.Tech. from Kanpur University's Harcourt Butler Technological Institute (now Harcourt Butler Technical University) in 1989. After that, he joined University of Allahabad's Motilal Nehru Regional Engineering College (now Motilal Nehru National Institute of Technology, Allahabad) and completed his M.E. and Ph.D. in 1991 and 2000 respectively.

== Career ==
After completing his master's he joined Institute of Engineering and Technology, Lucknow as a faculty. In 1999 he joined Harcourt Butler Technological Institute (now Harcourt Butler Technical University) as a faculty and later became Head, Department of Mechanical Engineering, Harcourt Butler Technological Institute. He also worked as additional controller of examination and later as vice-chancellor at Uttar Pradesh Technical University. After establishment of Madan Mohan Malaviya University of Technology (MMMUT) he joined as its founding vice-chancellor in 2013. He spearheaded the transformation of Madan Mohan Malaviya Engineering College into one of India's top emerging universities – MMMUT.

He has been associated with many apex bodies and organisations of India. He is a member of Board of Governors of many institutions, some of which include (past as well as current associations) -

- Member, Board of Governors, Indian Institute of Technology, Kanpur (U.P.)
- Member, Board of Governors, Indian Institute of Technology, BHU, Varanasi (U.P.)
- Member, Board of Governors, Indian Institute of Technology, Roorkee (Uttarakhand)
- Member, Northern Regional Committee, All India Council for Technical Education, New Delhi
- Member, General Council, National Board of Accreditation, New Delhi
- Member, Finance Committee, National Board of Accreditation, New Delhi
- Member, Board of Governors, Gautam Buddha University, Greater Noida(U.P.)
- Member, General Council, Ram Manohar Law University, Lucknow (U.P.)
- Member, Court, University of Allahabad, Allahabad (U.P.)
- Member, Board of Governors, Kamla Nehru Institute of Technology, Sultanpur (U.P.)
- Member, Board of Governors, U.P. Textile Technology Institute, Kanpur (U.P.)
- Member, Governing Council, Jaypee University of Information Technology, Waknaghat, Solan (H.P.)
- Member, Executive Council, Allahabad State University, Allahabad (U.P.)
- Member, Executive Council, Jannayak Chandrashekhar University, Ballia (U.P.)
- Member, Board of Governors, Institute of Engineering & Technology, Dr. Ram Manohar Lohia Avadh University, Faizabad (U.P.)
- President, Alumni Association, HBTI, Kanpur
- Member, Board of Governors, Lucknow College of Architecture, Lucknow
- Member, Executive Council, Soban Singh Jeena University, Almora (Uttarakhand)

== Awards and recognitions ==
Onkar has been a Limca Book of Records holder twice (2014, 2015) for his novel work in air turbine-engine based motorbike. He is also a holder of three patents –

1. "Motorised Wheel Chair" Jointly with Artificial Limbs Manufacturing Corporation Ltd., Kanpur
2. "Solar Powered Tricycle" Jointly with Artificial Limbs Manufacturing Corporation Ltd., Kanpur
3. "Rotary & Vane Type Air Engine" - jointly with Bharat Raj Singh

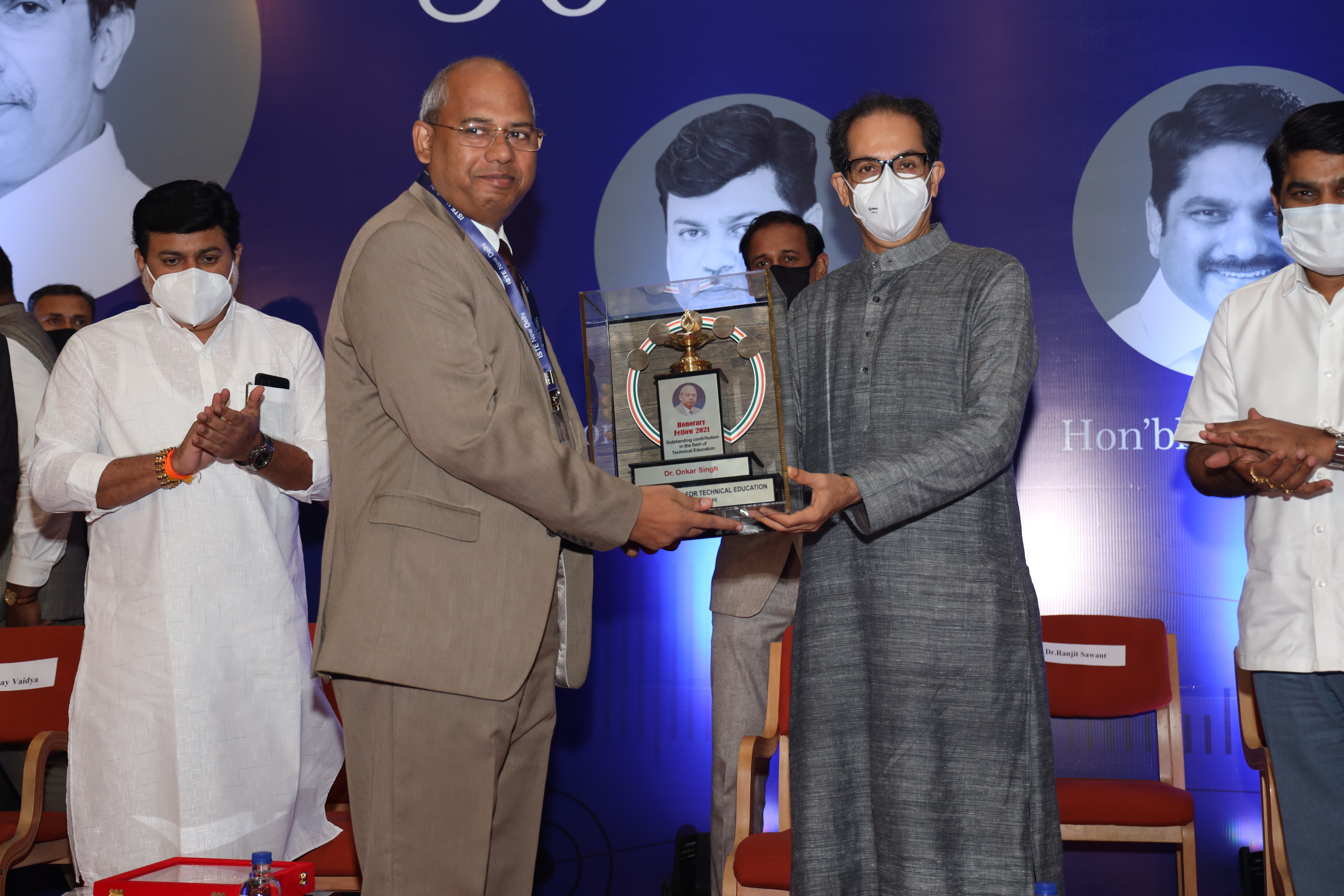
Prof. Onkar Singh receiving ISTE Honorary Fellowship from Hon'ble Chief Minister of Maharashtra, Uddhav Thackeray

He has also received several awards at national and international levels, which include –

1. Honorary Fellowship - 2020 of Indian Society for Technical Education New Delhi received on 5 October 2021
2. AICTE Young Teacher Career Award, 2000
3. National Record for development of air turbine engine for running motor bike – LIMCA Book of Records, March 2014
4. National Record as the first academics’ work in US school text book – LIMCA Book of Records February 2015.
5. 100 Most Influential Vice Chancellors Award, 2016, Mumbai.
6. Asia's Education Excellence Award – Exemplary Leader award, 2016, Singapore
7. Letter of Appreciation from Vice Chancellor, U.P. Technical University, Lucknow, 2006
8. Letter of Appreciation from Vice Chancellor, Mahamaya Technical University, Noida, 2011
9. Sherpa Kulpati of India - 2023
10. Global Visionary Award - Collaborative Visionary Award for Exceptional Leadership in Educational Enhancement, 2024
11. Fellow of Eminence Award on World Teachers Day 5 October 2024 by World Academy of Higher Education and Development, New Delhi
12. Vice Chancellor of the Year Award - 2024
13. Eminent Mechanical Engineer Award 2025 by The Institution of Engineers (India) in its 40th National Convention of Mechanical Engineers 23 August 2025 at Durgapur (West Bengal)- INDIA
14. Padma Vibhushan Dr. Murli Manohar Joshi Teachers Award 2025 in 8th FWA Industry - Academia Conclave 2025, held on 31 October 2025 at New Delhi.
15. Mata Savitribai Phule Distinguished Academia Award 2026 on birth anniversary of Mata Savitribai Phule on 3 January 2026 at Orai, Jalaun (Uttar Pradesh) - INDIA.

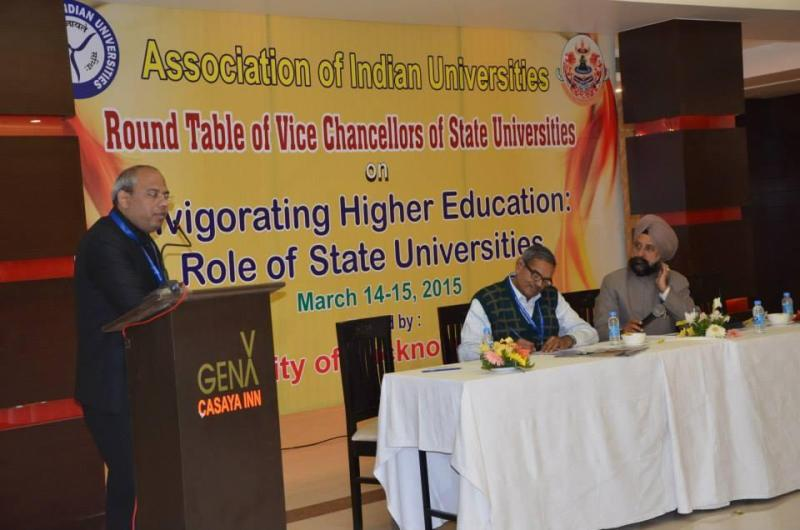
Onkar Singh delivering a talk at Association of Indian Universities Conference

== Books authored ==
Onkar has authored many books widely used as textbooks in many engineering colleges across India and for general reading.

1. Engineering Thermodynamics
2. Applied Thermodynamics
3. Introduction to Mechanical Engineering (Thermodynamics & Strength of Materials)
4. Thermal Turbomachines
5. Elements of Mechanical Engineering
6. Challenges and Strategies for Sustainable Energy, Efficiency, and Environment
7. Thermodynamic Investigation Upon Combined Cycle with Inlet Air Cooling
8. Thermodynamic Analysis Of Combined Power Cycle With Ammonia Water Mixture For Power Generation
9. Some Discourses on Education - In Indian Context
10. Musings on Education
11. The Catch 22s of Indian Education
12. Exploring Horizons
13. Engineering India's Education

He has also authored a large number of articles and his books on education, titled Some Discourses on Education– in Indian Context, Musings on Education, The Catch 22s of Indian Education, Exploring Horizons , Engineering India's Education, discuss the present-day issues with education in India.

== Books edited and Book chapters ==
Onkar has edited two books.

1. Hybrid Power Cycle Arrangements for Lower Emission
2. Prospects of Hydrogen Fueled Power Generation

He also has contributed book chapters to many popular books on climate change and global warming, and some other subjects like

1. The Impact of Air Pollution on Health, Agriculture and Technology
2. Fossil Fuel and the Environment
3. Global Warming – Impacts and Future Perspective
4. Can Glacier and Ice Melt Be Reversed?
5. Elements of Teaching Learning Process
6. Quality, Accreditation and Ranking
7. Hazardous Waste Management
8. Advances in Thermofluids and Renewable Energy
9. Hybrid Power Cycle Arrangements for Lower Emissions
10. Human Resource Management in Universities: Pitfalls and Prospects
11. Prospects of Hydrogen Fueled Power Generation
