= Alok Kumar Rai =

Professor at BHU and Director of IIM Calcutta

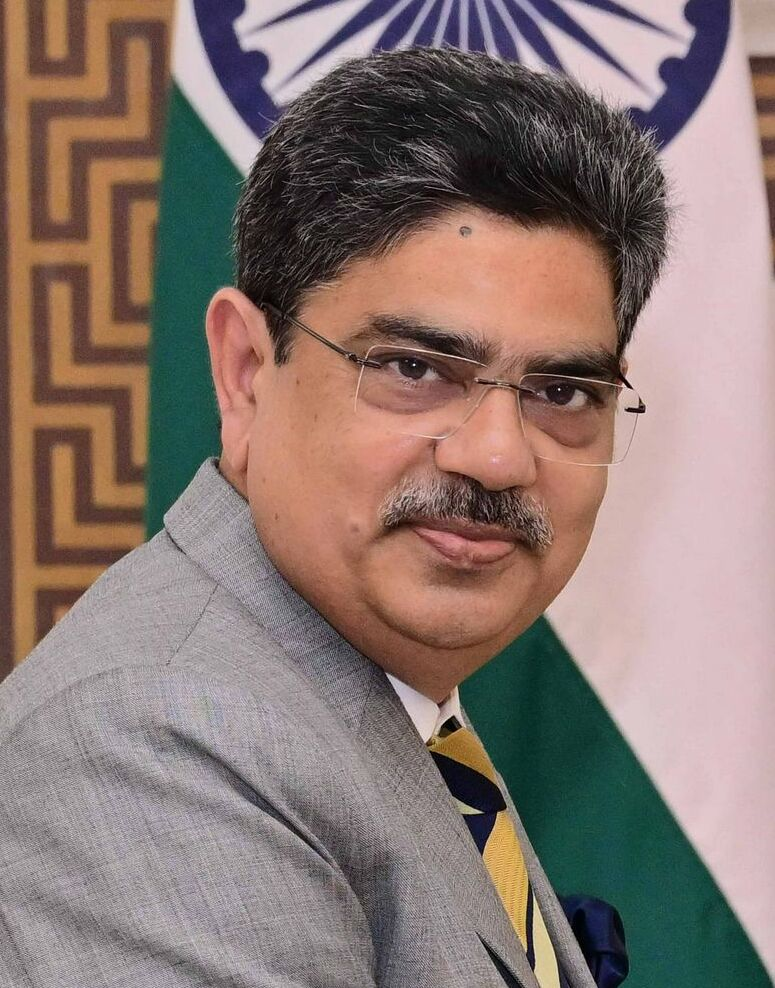
- Rai in 2025
- Born: 20 January 1976 (age 50)
- Education: VBS Purvanchal University; Banaras Hindu University; University of Allahabad

Alok Kumar Rai (born 20 January 1976) is a professor of marketing at the Institute of Management Studies, Banaras Hindu University, currently serving as the Director of IIM Calcutta since 15 July 2025. He previously served as the 40th Vice-Chancellor of the University of Lucknow from December 2019 to July 2025.

== Education and career ==
Rai completed his B.Sc. from Allahabad University, MBA from Banaras Hindu University, and PhD from VBS Purvanchal University. He has also held additional charge as Vice-Chancellor of Sampurnanand Sanskrit Vishwavidyalaya, Dr. Bhimrao Ambedkar University, Agra, and Dr. A. P. J. Abdul Kalam Technical University, Lucknow.

== Publications ==
Rai has published several famous textbooks, some of which are:

- Kumar Rai, Alok (2017). Customer Loyalty: Concept, Context and Character. McGraw Hill. ISBN 9789332902718.
- Kumar Rai, Alok (2012). Customer Relationship Management: Concepts and Cases (2nd ed.). Prentice Hall India Learning Private Limited. ISBN 9788120346956.

=== Research ===
- Rai on GoogleScholar
