= Yang Gao (academic) =

Aeronautical engineer and academic

Yang Gao was the Professor of Space Autonomous Systems and the Associate Dean (International) in the Faculty of Engineering and Physical Sciences (FEPS) at Surrey Space Centre. Gao's work has been used for developing missions including ExoMars, Proba3, MoonLITE and Moonraker.

== Early life and education ==
Gao received a B. Eng (with first class honors) in Electrical and Electronic Engineering at Nanyang Technological University, Singapore in 2000, followed by a Ph.D. in Electrical and Electronic Engineering from the same university in 2003.

== Career ==
Gao develops robotics for extreme environments, specializing in robotic perception and sensing and applications of artificial intelligence. Gao's work has been covered in numerous media outlets, including the BBC.

Gao is an elected fellow of the Royal Aeronautical Society and the Institute of Engineering and Technology.

== Awards and honors ==
- Institute of Engineering and Technology (IET) - Elected Fellow
- Royal Aeronautical Society (RAeS) - Elected Fellow.
- SCEPTrE Fellowship - 2010-2011
- SMF Fellowship - 2002-2004
- NTU Scholarship for PhD Research - 2000-2002
- Singapore-Millennium-Foundation Fellowship - 2002
- First Prize, IEEE Asia-Pacific Region Postgraduate Paper Contest - 2002
- Motorola Book Prize on Robotics and Automation - 2000
