= Ajay Taneja =

Indian environmental chemist

Prof. Ajay Taneja
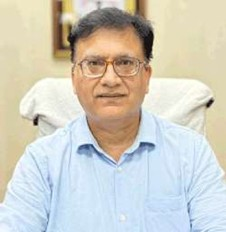

Ajay Taneja is an Indian environmental chemist and academic administrator who serves as the Vice-Chancellor of Khwaja Moinuddin Chishti Language University. He assumed office in April 2025 after being appointed by the Governor of Uttar Pradesh, Anandiben Patel, in her capacity as Chancellor of the university. He is the former Pro Vice-Chancellor of Dr. Bhimrao Ambedkar University.
