= Rashesh Shah =

Indian businessman (born 1963)

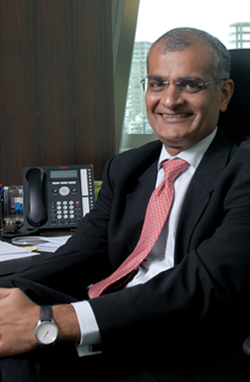
- Chairman & CEO of the Edelweiss Group
- Born: 30 September 1963 (age 62)
- Education: Bachelor of Science degree in statistics, KC College; MBA, Indian Institute of Management Ahmedabad, 1989
- Occupation: Finance
- Known for: Financial Advisor
- Spouse: Vidya Shah
- Children: (2) Neel, born in 1995 and Avanti, born in 2000

Rashesh Shah (born 30 September 1963) is an Indian businessman, chairman and CEO of the Edelweiss Group. Also, he is one of India's leading diversified financial services conglomerates. He is also the co-founder of Edelweiss Financial Services Limited (EFSL).

== Early life and education ==
Rashesh Shah was a student of Bharatiya Vidya Bhavan and Manav Mandir High School in Mumbai. He completed a Bachelor of Science degree in statistics from KC College, Mumbai, and spent a year studying exports at the Indian Institute of Foreign Trade (IIFT), Delhi.

After that, he completed his MBA from the Indian Institute of Management (IIM), Ahmedabad in 1989. Post graduation, he joined ICICI and later co-founded Edelweiss Group with Venkat Ramaswamy in November 1995.

== Family ==
Born in a Gujarati family, Rashesh Shah was the first in his family to attend an English-medium school. He is married to Vidya Shah, CEO of EdelGive Foundation, and with whom he has two children: Neel, born in 1995, and Avanti, born in 2000.

== Career ==
He left his position at Prime Securities to co-found Edelweiss with Venkat Ramaswamy. The company was established in November 1995 and began operations in February 1996. Due to an inability to meet SEBI's capital requirement of ₹5 crore, Shah and Ramaswamy adjusted their business plan, focusing on private equity syndication, mergers and acquisitions (M&A), and advisory services. They started with a small office in Mumbai's Fountain area, employing just three people.

In 2000, the 10-employee company crossed a capital mark of ₹5 crores and became a Category-1 merchant bank. Currently, Rashesh and Vidya Shah hold nearly 27% stake in Edelweiss. The company has an asset base of ₹48,000 crore and a net worth of ₹5,400 crore. Besides, Rashesh Shah has worked as a member of the executive committee of the National Stock Exchange (NSE) and the Stock Exchange Board of India (SEBI). He reviewed Insider Trading Regulations at SEBI. He has also held the chair of the National Council on Capital Markets formed by the Associate Chambers of Commerce and Industry of India (ASSOCHAM)

He served as the President of the Federation of Indian Chambers of Commerce and Industry (FICCI) for 2017–18.

A regular commentator on macroeconomic policies, development matters, and financial markets in the mainstream and financial media, Rashesh is a part of the High-Level Task Force on Public Credit Registry for India and the Insolvency Law Committees.

== Awards and recognition ==
Rashesh Shah, Co-founder and Chairman of the Edelweiss Group, has received several awards and recognitions throughout his career for his contributions to the financial services sector and his leadership in corporate social responsibilities.

=== Awards and honors ===
- Entrepreneur of the Year Award Finalist (2017):Shah was a finalist for the Entrepreneur of the Year Award in 2017, acknowledging his significant contributions to the financial services industry.
- National CSR Award (2019): Under Shah's leadership Edelweiss Financial Services Limited received the National Corporate Social Responsibility (CSR) Award in 2019. The award, presented by the President of India, acknowledge the company's commitment to impactful social initiatives (Source).

== Allegations ==
In January 2020, the Enforcement Directorate issued summons to Edelweiss Group and Shah to join a case involving an alleged INR. 2,000 crore violation of FEMA provisions. This pertains to Mumbai-based Capstone Forex Pvt. Ltd. Rashesh Shah has rejected allegations of FEMA violations.

== Philanthropy ==
He is involved in the EdelGive Foundation, Edelweiss's philanthropy arm, which was set up in 2008 by his wife Vidya, to provide expertise in the financial sector to the not-for-profit sector.
