= Veer Bahadur Singh Purvanchal University =

University in Jaunpur, Uttar Pradesh, India

- Former name: Purvanchal University
- Motto: tejasvi nāvadhītamastu (from the Taittiriya āraṇyaka of the Yajurveda, 8.0.0)
- Motto in English: "May our knowledge become brilliant."
- Type: State university (Government)
- Established: 2 October 1987 (38 years ago)
- Accreditation: AICTE; NAAC
- Academic affiliations: AIU; UGC; BCI; PCI
- Chancellor: Governor of Uttar Pradesh
- Vice-Chancellor: Rakesh Kumar singh
- Faculty: 150+
- Administrative staff: 412 campus employees
- Students: 1,421
- Undergraduates: 864
- Postgraduates: 535
- Doctoral students: 22
- Location: Jaunpur, Uttar Pradesh, India
- Campus: Semi-urban, 171.5 acres (69.4 ha)
- Colours: Yellow; Barbie Pink
- Mascot: Lotus flower
- Website: www.vbspu.ac.in

Veer Bahadur Singh Purvanchal University (VBSPU), formerly Purvanchal University, is a public state university based in Jaunpur, Uttar Pradesh, India. It was established in 1987 as a residential-cum-affiliating university. It is named after Shri Veer Bahadur Singh, the former chief minister of Uttar Pradesh.

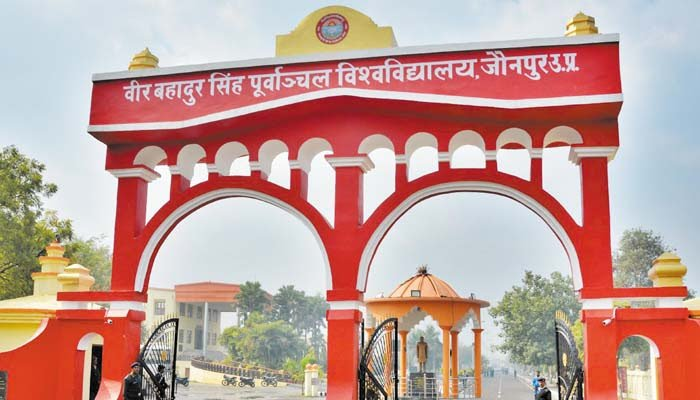
Main entrance gate of the university

The university is engaged in research through MoU with foreign and local universities, organizations and institutions. Many of its departments are identified by UGC as Centres of Excellence.

== History ==
Purvanchal University, Jaunpur renamed as Veer Bahadur Singh Purvanchal University in the honour of late Shri Vir Bahadur Singh, former Chief Minister of the state, was established on 2 October 1987 as an affiliating university under U.P. state university act 1973. Started with the 68 affiliated colleges, the university now has widened its spectrum of activities with 367 affiliated graduate and post-graduate colleges and student enrollment of nearly three lakh and eighty thousand (380,000) in five districts of Eastern Uttar Pradesh.

In 2024, Two professors were suspended for allegedly extorting money from students in exchange of marks on answer sheets written with songs, music, names of cricketers and the slogan Jai Shree Ram. They purposefully increased the marked from Zero to close to Sixty percent.

== Campus ==
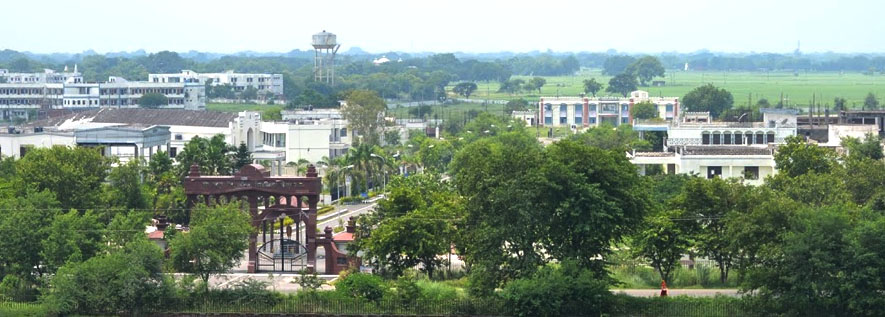
Aerial View of Main Campus

Inside of the university

The university is about 11 km from the historic city of Jaunpur on Jaunpur-Shahganj road which divides its 171.5-acre (0.694 km^{2}) campus into two parts: one with the campus and another with a hostel, teacher's colony, transit hostel, guest house, chancellor suite and vice chancellor residence.

=== Auditorium ===
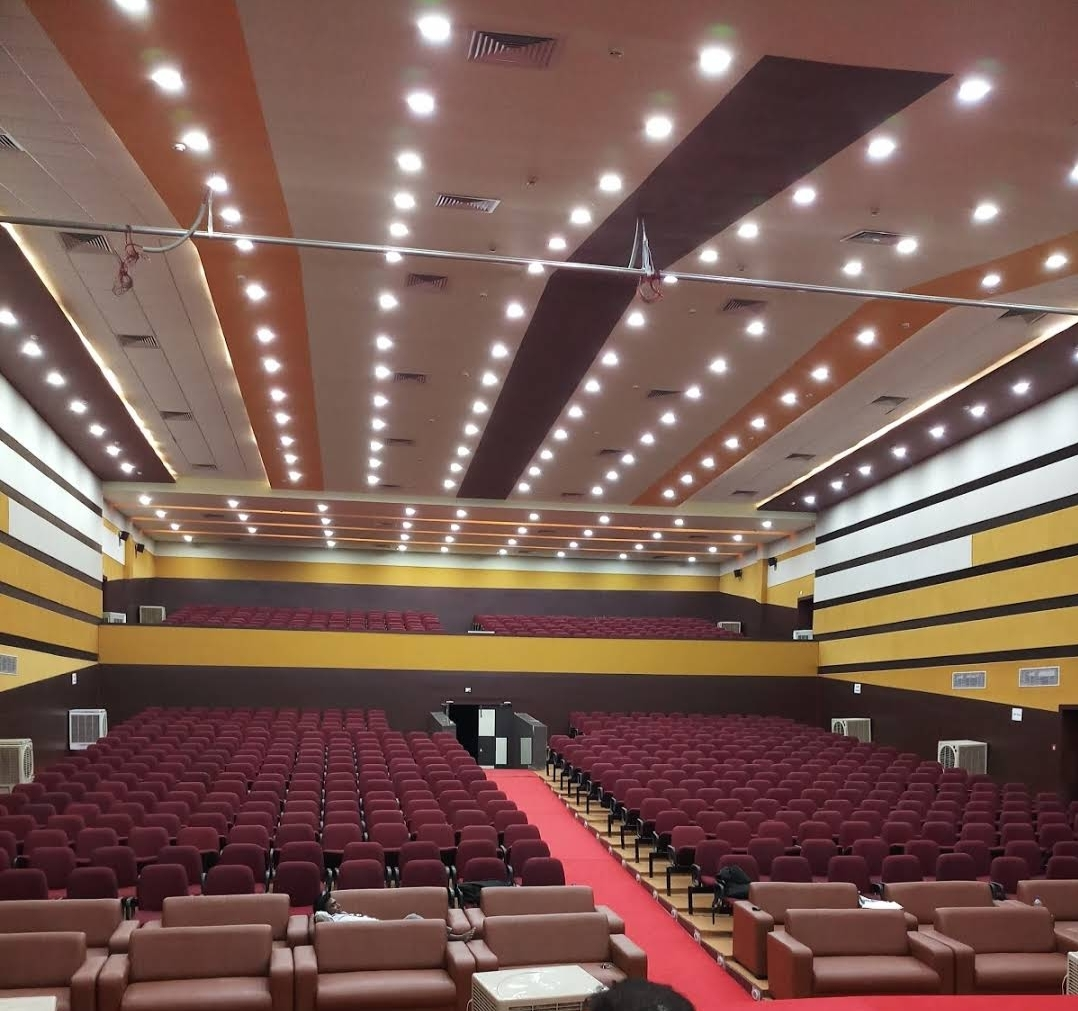
Mahant Avaidyanath Auditorium

The university auditorium has a capacity of 1000 students. It is fully air conditioned with wooden work on the stage lot of space in front. The auditorium has separate rooms and other basic facilities for conducting special programmes like convocation, national and international level conferences, and many other academic and cultural events.

== Organisation and administration ==
=== Faculties ===
Faculty of Management Studies

Institute of Pharmacy

Faculty of Engineering and Technology

- Departments
  - Computer Science and Engineering (CSE)
  - Information Technology (IT)
  - Electrical Engineering (EE)
  - Mechanical Engineering (ME)
  - Artificial Intelligence (AI)
  - Electronics and Communication Engineering (ECE)
  - Electronics and Instrumentation Engineering (EIE)

Faculty of Management Studies

- Departments
  - Business Management (includes MBA, Agri Business and e-Commerce)
  - Finance and Control
  - Business Economics
  - Human Resource Development (HRD)

Faculty of Computer Applications

- Departments
  - Computer Applications (BCA and MCA)

Faculty of Medicine

- Departments
  - Pharmacy (D.Pharm. and B.Pharm)

Faculty of Commerce

- Department
  - Bachelor of Commerce (Hon.)

Faculty of Science

- Departments
  - Biotechnology
  - Microbiology
  - Biochemistry
  - Environmental Science

Faculty of Applied Social Sciences

- Departments
  - Social Science
  - Applied Psychology
  - Mass Communication

Faculty of Law

- Departments
  - Integrated B.A. L.L.B.

=== Institutes ===
Prof. Rajendra Singh Institute of Physical Science for Study & Research

- Department
  - Mathematics
  - Physics
  - Chemistry
  - Earth and Planetary Sciences
  - Nanoscience and Technology
  - Renewable Energy

== Academics ==
=== Admission ===
Students are admitted to various courses based on the merit of a qualifying degree. To pursue post-graduation courses at Veer Bahadur Singh Purvanchal University, the candidate must have passed graduation with at least 45% marks from a reputable university in the relevant specialisation. Selection of candidates to MCA, MBA, B.Pharma and B.Tech. is done on the basis of marks obtained in JEE MAINS Following the publication of the SEE-UPTU merit list, candidates need to appear for the counselling on the specified date and time at the allotted venue. The final list of candidates selected for admission is published on the university website thereafter.

=== Placement ===
The university has been in ties with the top companies offering various job roles and opportunities to the students at lucrative pay packages, ranging from INR 1.8 lakh (180,000) to INR 15 lakh (1,500,000). Some of the key employers include Infosys, Paytm, Swiggy, Max Life Insurance, Zomato, LG Electronics, ICICI Prudential, Tech Mahindra, Kotak Mahindra Bank, Genpact and others.

== Research ==
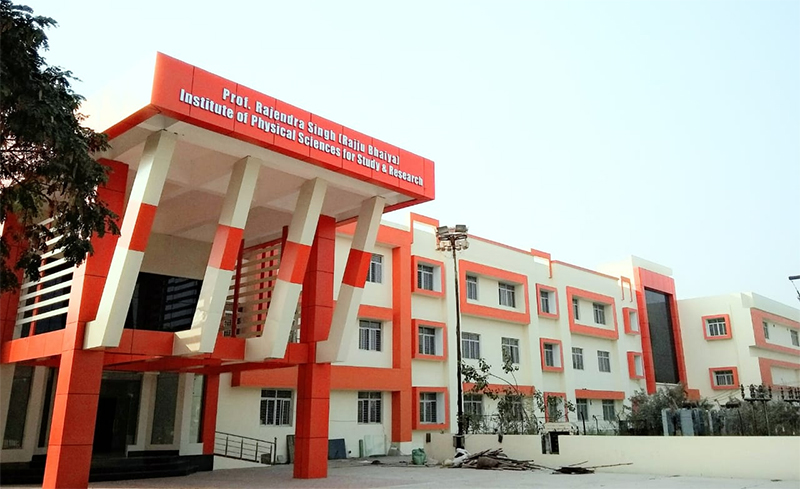
Research Institute in Purvanchal University

A committee is assigned to monitor research activity in the university. Over 60% of the faculty members have doctoral degrees and they are engaged in guiding research scholars. Faculty members are eligible to guide students after five years of teaching and publications in peer-reviewed journals. The Department of Biotechnology is one of the leading departments of the university. It was established in 1999. The department has good research facilities and the research groups, mainly the Human Molecular Genetics Laboratory and Molecular Biology Group, are involved in basic research.

== Sports ==
A large open stadium of ground and sitting capacity of 5000 has been witnessing several sports finale of zonal, state and national level. The lounge of the stadium includes rooms in first and second floor and other basic facilities useful for conducting sports, NSS, Rovers and Rangers programmes. In the recent years the university has conducted several sports events like All India Kabaddi, basketball, handball, Inter-University Cricket tournament etc.
