= Aashisha Chakraborty =

Indian author and management professional

Aashisha Chakraborty is an Indian author and management professional. She received the PM-YUVA from the Ministry of Education and Write India awards, and is the author of a bestseller, Misadventures of a Salesgirl.

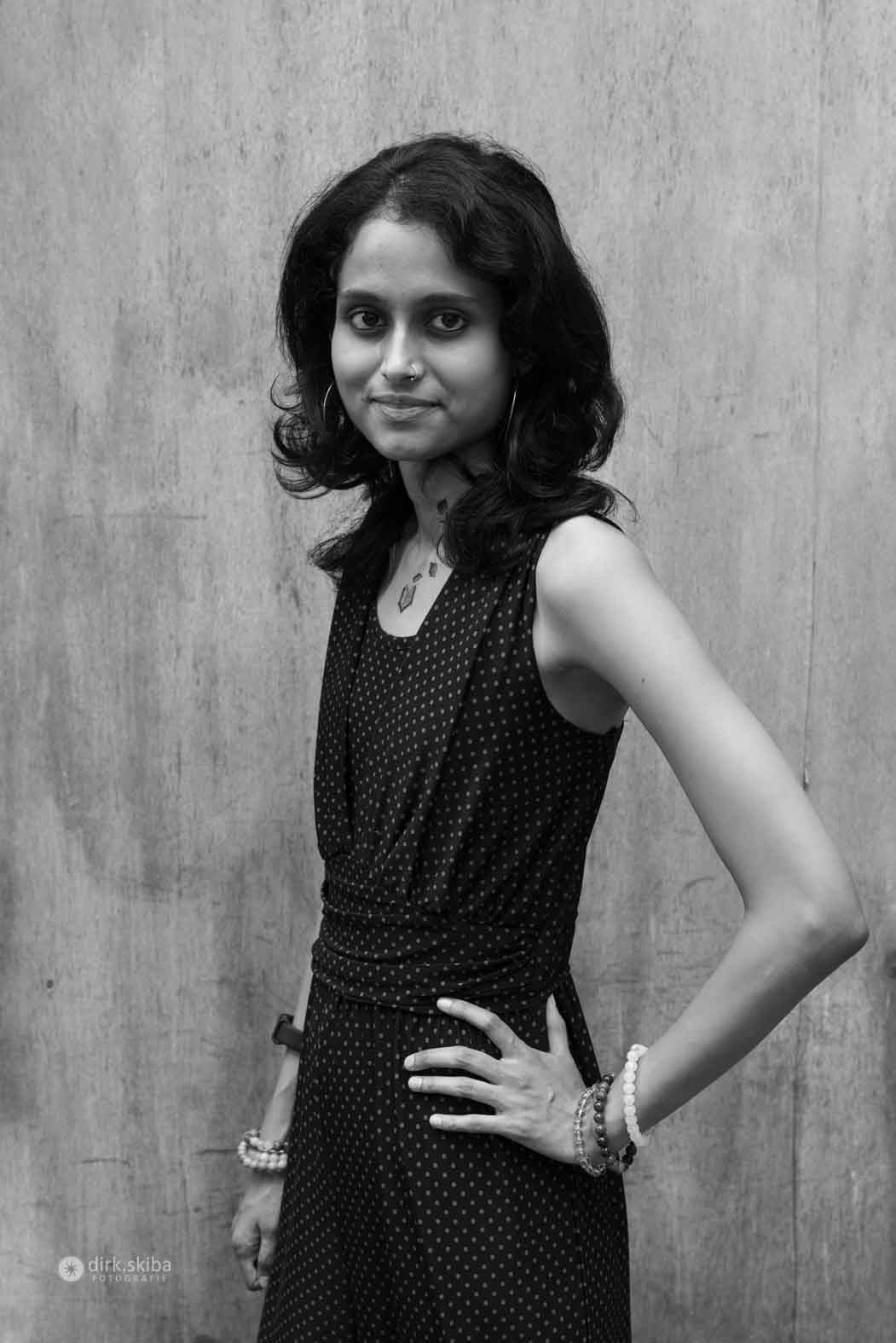
Aashisha Chakraborty

== Early life and education ==
Aashisha Chakraborty was born to Shila and Utpal Chakraborty in New Delhi, India. She attended Summer Fields School, Kailash Colony, New Delhi. Aashisha obtained her bachelor's degree in computer engineering from Jamia Millia Islamia, and her master's degree in business administration from the Indian Institute of Foreign Trade, New Delhi.

== Author ==
Chakraborty debuted as an author with her bestselling novel called Mis(s)adventures of a Salesgirl, published by Rupa Publications. The book was loosely based on her experiences as a sales manager. Her second book is a work of historical fiction with the National Book Trust, titled The 13-year-old Queen and Her Inherited Destiny.

== Writing ==
=== Books ===
- Mis(s)adventures of a Salesgirl (Rupa Publications, 2022)
- The 13-year-old Queen and her inherited destiny (National Book Trust, 2023)

== Awards ==
Chakraborty was one of 75 recipients of the PM-YUVA Fellowship from the Ministry of Education, Government of India in 2021. She was the winner of The Times of India Write India Season 2, having been ranked first by Shobhaa De, and 6 each by Manu Joseph and Twinkle Khanna, in 2018.
