= Khwaja Moinuddin Chishti Language University =

State university in Uttar Pradesh, India

- Former names: Uttar Pradesh Arabi Pharsi University; Uttar Pradesh Urdu, Arabi-Farsi University; Manyavar Shri Kanshi Ram Ji Urdu, Arabi-Farsi University; Khwaja Moinuddin Chishti Urdu, Arabi-Farsi University
- Type: State university
- Established: 2009
- Affiliations: UGC
- Chancellor: Governor of Uttar Pradesh
- Vice-Chancellor: Ajay Taneja
- Location: IIM Road, Lucknow, Lucknow, Uttar Pradesh, India; 26.928709°N 80.8963305°E
- Campus: Urban
- Website: www.kmclu.ac.in

Khwaja Moinuddin Chishti Language University (KMCLU), formerly Khwaja Moinuddin Chishti Urdu, Arabi-Farsi University (KMCUAFU) is a state university based in Lucknow, Uttar Pradesh, India. Established in 2009, the university is named after Sufi saint Mu'in al-Din Chishti.

== History ==
The university was established in 2009 as "Uttar Pradesh Arabi Pharsi University", under the Uttar Pradesh Arabi Pharsi University Act, 2009. In 2010 the act was repealed and the university was reintroduced as "Uttar Pradesh Urdu, Arabi-Farsi University" under Uttar Pradesh State Universities (Amendment) Act, 2010. It was renamed "Manyavar Shri Kanshi Ram Ji Urdu, Arabi-Farsi University" in 2011 under Uttar Pradesh State Universities (Amendment) Act, 2011, to honor the politician and social reformer Kanshi Ram. About a year later it was renamed again "Khwaja Moinuddin Chishti Urdu, Arabi-Farsi University" in 2012, under Uttar Pradesh State Universities (Amendment) Act, 2012, in honor of Sufi saint Mu'in al-Din Chishti. In 2020, it was renamed a final time "Khwaja Moinuddin Chishti Language University" under Uttar Pradesh State Universities (Amendment) Act, 2020.

Anis Ansari was appointed the founder vice-chancellor (VC) of the university in April 2010. Mahrukh Mirza was appointed VC in October 2017. After vacating the position in October 2020, in January 2021, after all candidates for the VC position have been rejected, Vinay Kumar Pathak was appointed VC as an additional charge. Anil Kumar Shukla was appointed VC in April 2021. In January 2022, Alok Kumar Rai, VC of Lucknow University, was appointed VC as KMCLU as an additional charge. Prof. Masood Alam was appointed as Vice Chancellor on 25.10.2020 and he was on the post till 22.12.2020.

== Campus ==
The university is presently located on 28 acres of land on Sitapur-Hardoi Bypass road, adjacent to Indian Institute of Management (IIM), Lucknow. The Govt. of U.P. has decided to acquire additional 15 acres of land for the University. Another proposal of purchasing additional 120 acres of land from Lucknow Development Authority(LDA) is also being considered by Govt. of U.P.

== Department ==
- Arts and Humanities
  - Arabic
  - English and Modern European & Asian Languages
  - Hindi
  - Persian
  - Sanskrit and Pali
  - Urdu
  - Commerce
  - Business Administartion
  - Commerce
- Engineering & Technology
  - Applied Science and Humanities
  - Biotechnology Engineering
  - Computer Science and Engineering
  - Civil Engineering
  - Mechanical Engineering
- Legal Studies
- Pharmacy
- Science
  - Botany
  - Biotechnology
  - Chemistry
  - Computer Science abd Information Technology
  - Mathematics
  - Microbiology
  - Zoology
- Social Science
  - Economics
  - Education
  - Geography
  - History
  - Journalism and Mass Communication
  - Physical Education
  - Political Science
  - Sociology
  - Psychology
- Department of Home Science
