= Vinay Kumar Pathak =

Indian professor

- Born: 2 June 1969 (age 57); Kanpur, India
- Citizenship: Indian
- Education: Bachelor of Technology in Computer Science, Harcourt Butler Technological Institute (1991) Master of Technology, IIT Kanpur (1998) PhD, UP Technical University(now AKTU), (2004)
- Occupations: Professor, Vice Chancellor, Chhatrapati Shahu Ji Maharaj University, Dr. A.P.J. Abdul Kalam Technical University, Vardhaman Mahaveer Open University, Uttarakhand Open University

Vinay Kumar Pathak (born 2 June 1969) is an Indian professor (Computer Science) who has served as a lecturer, Assistant Professor at Harcourt Butler Technical University Kanpur, Project Scientist at IIT Kanpur, and again as Professor and Dean at Harcourt Butler Technical University Kanpur on lien. He has served as Vice Chancellor of Uttarakhand Open University (UOU) from 25 November 2009 till November 2012. He was then appointed Vice-Chancellor of Vardhaman Mahaveer Open University (VMOU) in Rajasthan's Kota on 1 February 2013 and served there till 31 July 2015 with additional charge as officiating Vice-Chancellor of the Rajasthan Technical University in Kota on 16 May 2015 till 31 July 2015. On 4 August 2015, he was appointed as Vice-Chancellor of Dr. A.P.J. Abdul Kalam Technical University (AKTU) and served there till 9 August 2021 with additional charge as Vice-Chancellor of Harcourt Butler Technical University Kanpur and officiating Vice-Chancellor of Lucknow's Khwaja Moinuddin Chishti Language University (KMCLU) till 9 August 2021. In, April 2021 he was appointed as Vice-Chancellor of Chhatrapati Shahu Ji Maharaj University where he is currently serving with additional charge as Vice-Chancellor of the Dr. Bhimrao Ambedkar University in Agra from January 2022 till September 2022. He has also served as President of the Association of Indian Universities (AIU) from 1 July 2024 till 30 June 2025. He has successfully organized many national and international conferences.

== Education ==
Pathak did his Bachelor of Technology in computer science from Harcourt Butler Technological Institute, Kanpur, in 1991; M.Tech. from IIT Kharagpur in 1998; and Ph.D. in computer science from U.P. Technical University, Lucknow under the joint guidance of IIT Kanpur, November 2004. Pathak's research interests include computational geometry and image processing, artificial intelligence, and machine learning.

Pathak was instrumental in implementing Vedic mathematics in 1992. He worked at Media Lab Asia and successfully completed an info-sculpture project.

== Controversies ==
Extortion and corruption allegations.

In 2022, the Uttar Pradesh Police registered an FIR against Vinay Kumar Pathak for bribery, extortion, and criminal intimidation during his tenure as Vice-Chancellor of Dr. Bhimrao Ambedkar University. The complaint was filed by a private technology services company, which alleged that Pathak demanded a commission of approximately 15 percent for clearing examination-related payments. The matter was initially investigated by the Uttar Pradesh Special Task Force (STF) and was later transferred to the Central Bureau of Investigation (CBI).

Financial irregularities

Media reports have alleged financial mismanagement and irregularities in the approval of contracts and payments during Pathak's administrative tenure at multiple universities. These include accusations of seeking commissions for passing institutional bills and for influencing procurement decisions. Investigations into these claims were reported by regional and national newspapers.

Academic credentials and plagiarism concerns

Separate reports have questioned aspects of Pathak's academic résumé, including allegations of inaccuracies in curriculum vitae details and plagiarism in scholarly work. These issues were highlighted in national media coverage during the corruption investigation.

Administrative and governance criticism

Pathak's administrative decisions have drawn criticism from sections of faculty and academic bodies, including complaints regarding appointments and procedural irregularities. In addition, some university officials raised concerns about his continued tenure as President of the Association of Indian Universities, citing governance and tenure-related issues.
