= Edelweiss Group =

Indian investment and financial services company pvt ltd

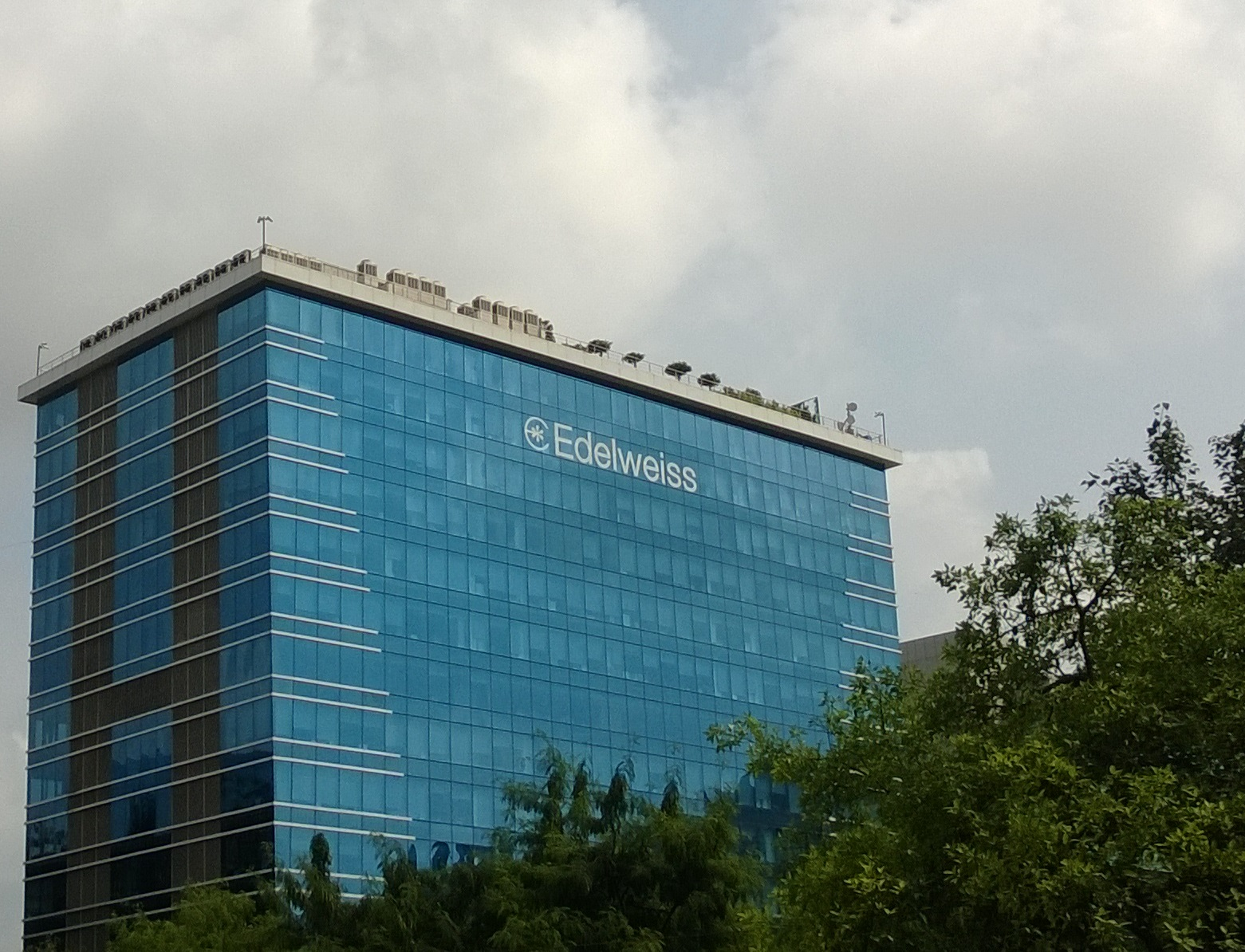
- Edelweiss Financial Services building in Mumbai
- Type: Public
- Traded as: BSE: 532922; NSE: EDELWEISS
- ISIN: INE532F01054
- Industry: Financial services
- Founded: November 1995; 31 years ago
- Founders: Rashesh Shah; Venkat Ramaswamy
- Headquarters: Mumbai, Maharashtra, India
- Area served: Worldwide
- Key people: Rashesh Shah (Chairman & CEO)
- Products: Stockbroker; Commodity Broker; Asset Management; Wealth Management; Investment Management; Investment Banking; Private Equity; Mortgage loans; Insurance
- Revenue: ▲₹8,632 crore (US$900 million) (2023)
- Operating income: ▼₹2,827 crore (US$290 million) (2023)
- Net income: ▲₹273 crore (US$28 million) (2023)
- AUM: ▲₹175,000 crore (US$18 billion) (2023)
- Total assets: ▲₹44,064 crore (US$4.6 billion) (2023)
- Total equity: ▲₹6,654 crore (US$690 million) (2023)
- Number of employees: 8,820 (2023)
- Subsidiaries: Edelweiss Life Insurance Company Limited; Edelweiss Asset Reconstruction Limited; EAAA India Limited; Edelweiss Asset Management Limiter; ECL Finance Limited; Edelweiss Retail Finance Limited
- Website: edelweissfin.com

Edelweiss Group (officially known as Edelweiss Financial Services Limited) is an investment and financial services company based in Mumbai. It was co-founded by Rashesh Shah and Venkat Ramaswamy.

The company deals in various financial services ranging from brokerage services to life insurance and general insurance, private equity and other investment-related services through subsidiaries. It has a network of sub-brokers and authorised people across India. It is registered with National Stock Exchange of India, Bombay Stock Exchange and Multi Commodity Exchange.

== History ==
Edelweiss was founded in 1995 by Rashesh Shah and Venkat Ramaswamy. Initially, the company worked on private equity syndication, mergers, acquisitions (M&A) and focused on advisory services.

Edelweiss worked on mergers & acquisitions, providing advisory and investment banking services. Edelweiss also offered equity broking, portfolio management, and wholesale financing services to individuals and corporates.

=== 1996–2004 ===
The company became a merchant bank in 2000. It was also helped start-ups raise funds via the non-IPO route, Venture Capital (VC) and Private Equity funds (PE). In 2000, the company had capital mark of ₹50 million. It acquired Rooshnil Securities in 2001.

=== 2004–2012 ===
During this period Edelweiss added institutional broking and non-banking financial company (NBFC) activity to its portfolio. In 2007, Edelweiss obtained its Clearing Member License. The same year, Edelweiss commenced asset management business with the launch of real estate funds.

In 2007, Edelweiss Global Wealth Management was established to offer wealth structuring solutions, asset protection, asset transfer strategies, risk management and investment banking solutions.

In 2008, EdelGive Foundation (the company's charitable wing) was established with education and livelihoods as its primary focus areas.

In mid-2008, with the launch of its wholly owned subsidiary, Edelweiss Alternative Asset Advisors Limited (EAAA), it entered the alternative asset management market. The group developed the platform organically, focusing on private credit, real estate, and infrastructure yield strategies for institutional and high-net-worth investors.

In 2010, Edelweiss acquired Anagram Capital, for Rs. 164 crore. In 2011, Edelweiss Tokio Life Insurance was established as a joint venture between Edelweiss and Japanese insurer Tokio Marine. Edelweiss held a 74 per cent stake in the JV.

=== 2012–2022 ===
In 2014, Edelweiss Financial Services acquired Mumbai-based asset management company, Forefront Capital Management.

In 2016, Edelweiss Asset Management Company completed the acquisition of fund schemes of JP Morgan Asset Management India.

In September 2016, Edelweiss Financial Services Ltd also agreed to acquire Ambit Investment Advisors' longshot hedge fund Ambit Alpha Fund.

In 2016, Caisse de dépôt et placement du Québec (CDPQ), a pension fund manager in North America, acquired 20 per cent equity stake in Edelweiss Asset Reconstruction Company (EARC) with a view to investing annually in stressed assets and the specialized corporate credit segment, over a four-year period.

In 2022, Edelweiss General Insurance's Group Health Policy includes LGBTQ+ community.

=== 2023–present ===
In 2023, the group launched its first dedicated Climate Fund, targeting a total corpus of US$500 million. The fund focuses on climate change mitigation and adaptation investments across sectors such as renewable energy, electric mobility, green infrastructure, water treatment, and industrial decarbonization. With a fund tenure of 10–12 years, it is structured to provide long-term capital to projects aligned with India's net-zero goals and the United Nations Sustainable Development Goals.

In 2024, the Reserve Bank of India suspended Edelweiss Asset Reconstruction Company from acquiring more business, and placed restrictions on the business activities of ECL Finance on concerns of evergreening of loans. Both are subsidiaries of Edelweiss Financial Services Ltd.

In December 2024, Edelweiss Alternatives filed a draft red herring prospectus (DRHP) with the Securities and Exchange Board of India (SEBI) for an initial public offering. The filing was rejected by SEBI in March 2025, citing regulatory concerns. The episode drew media attention due to the nature of the intervention and the company's prominent position in the alternatives space.

In July 2025, Nuvama Wealth Management, a firm spun off from Edelweiss Financial Services, was subjected to an income tax search by Indian authorities in connection with alleged irregularities. While Nuvama operates as an independent entity, Edelweiss Financial Services retains a small residual stake through its financial subsidiaries.

In September 2025, the Securities and Exchange Board of India (SEBI) settled adjudication proceedings against two entities of Edelweiss Alternatives namely Edelweiss Stressed and Troubled Assets Revival Fund Trust (ESTAR) and its investment manager, Edelweiss Alternative Asset Advisors Ltd (EAAAL), over alleged violations of the Alternative Investment Funds (AIF) Regulations. The case arose from investor complaints filed on SEBI's SCORES platform in 2021-22 and a subsequent show-cause notice issued in July 2024, citing governance and disclosure lapses. According to SEBI's settlement order dated 30 September 2025, the entities jointly paid a settlement amount of ₹61.42 lakh, and certain officers-in-default accepted a 12-month bar from associating with the firms in any capacity. SEBI stated that the settlement was made “without admission or denial” of findings and that the regulator may reopen the case if disclosures are later found to be incomplete or misleading.
