= Vardhman Mahaveer Open University =

Open university in Rajasthan, India

Coordinates: 25.134°N 75.811°E

- Type: Public, open
- Established: 1987; 39 years ago
- Affiliations: UGC
- Chancellor: Governor of Rajasthan
- Vice-Chancellor: Dr. Kailash Sodani
- Location: Kota, Rajasthan, India
- Website: www.vmou.ac.in

Vardhman Mahaveer Open University (VMOU), formerly Kota Open University, is an open university in Kota, Rajasthan, India, established in 1987. VMOU offers courses particularly in the humanities, commerce, library science and informatics. It is geographically distributed throughout Rajasthan, with regional centres in Ajmer, Bikaner, Jaipur, Jodhpur, Kota, Udaipur and Bharatpur, and several tens of study centres in other cities, in addition to a special centre at New Delhi.

== Leadership ==
Vinay Kumar Pathak was vice chancellor in 2013. Kailash Sodani was appointed vice chancellor in 2022.
