= R.K. Khandal =

Indian academic

Former vice chancellor at Dr. A.P.J. Abdul Kalam Technical University
- In office 2012–2015

Personal details
- Born: 6 September 1957 (age 68) Alwar, Rajasthan, India
- Education: Ph.D.(Applied Chemistry)
- Alma mater: Royal Society of Chemistry; Indian School of Mines, Dhanbad; University of Delhi
- Occupation: Academician

R.K. Khandal (born 6 September 1957) is an Indian academic. He is a former vice- chancellor of Uttar Pradesh Technical University. He is also a fellow of the Royal Society of Chemistry.

Khandal was also the president of the World Association of Industrial & Technological Organisations (WAITRO).

== Early life ==
Khandal was born in the village Jonaicha Kalan in district Alwar, India, He completed his education up to eighth standard in the village school, and studied for his higher secondary education at a Govt. school in Delhi followed by further higher studies (graduation and post graduation) from the Hindu College of the University of Delhi and received a Doctorate degree in Applied Chemistry from the Indian School of Mines, Dhanbad.

== Academics ==
- FRSC - Fellow of Royal Society of Chemistry (FRSC), United Kingdom
- Ph.D. (Applied Chemistry), Indian School of Mines, Dhanbad
- M.Sc. (Chemistry), University of Delhi, India

== Awards ==
- Foundation Day IIC (Northern Regional Centre): R.K. Khandal Awarded By Ex. Prez Pranav Mukherjee

== Books edited ==
- Radiation Processing Technology Applications: Volume I, An SRI Publication ISBN 978-81-910772-0-9
- Radiation Processing Technology Applications: Volume II, An SRI Publication ISBN 978-81-910772-1-6
