= Indian Institute of Foreign Trade =

Central civil service training institute

- Type: Public Business school Deemed-to-be-university
- Established: 2 May 1963; 63 years ago
- Accreditation: AACSB, NAAC
- Academic affiliations: UGC; AIU
- Budget: ₹184.08 crore (US$19 million) (FY2024–25 est.)
- Vice-Chancellor: Dr. K. Rangarajan (interim)
- Academic staff: 75
- Students: 1,034
- Postgraduates: 836
- Doctoral students: 198
- Location: South Delhi (HQ), India; 28°53′42″N 77°18′31″E
- Campus: Multiple sites 6 acres (24,000 m^{2})
- Other branches: GIFT City; Kolkata; Kakinada
- Nickname: IIFT
- Website: www.iift.ac.in

Indian Institute of Foreign Trade (IIFT) is a public business school headquartered in South Delhi, Delhi, India. It has been proposed to be declared as an Institute of National Importance by the Government of India. Established in 1963, it functions under the Ministry of Commerce and Industry of the Government of India. It also serves as a training institute for the probationary officers of the Indian Trade Service. Its headquarters are in South Delhi and it has additional campuses in GIFT City, Kolkata and Kakinada. A campus is set to open in Dubai and one in Maidangarhi in 2029.

== History ==
The institute was established as a Centre of Excellence in International Trade and Business in 1963. It is as an autonomous educational institute under the Ministry of Commerce and Industry.

It was granted "Deemed to be University" status in 2002. The National Assessment and Accreditation Council (NAAC) has recognized IIFT as a Grade 'A+' Institution in January 2024.

== Campuses ==
=== IIFT Delhi Campus ===
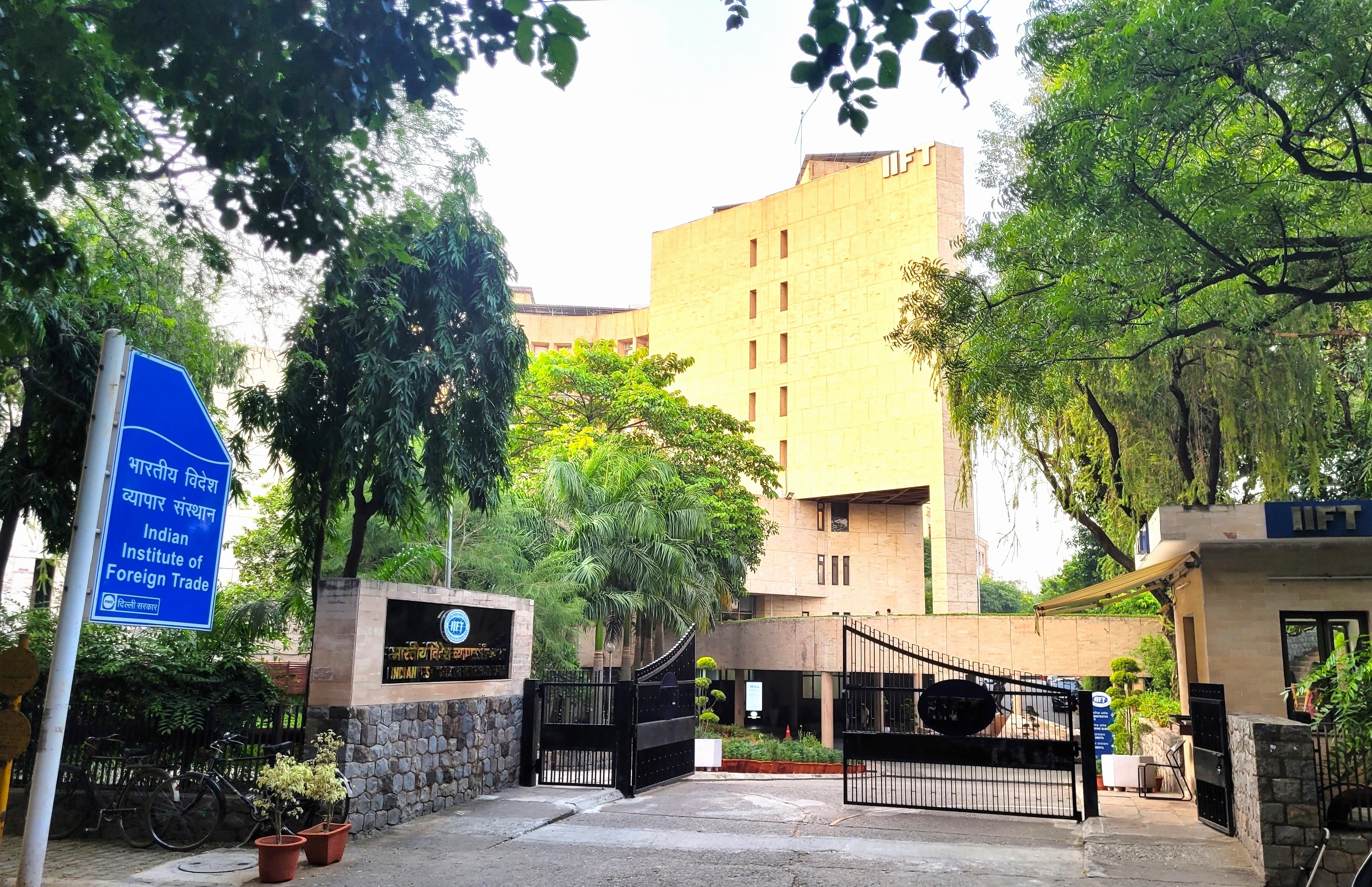
IIFT Delhi campus entrance

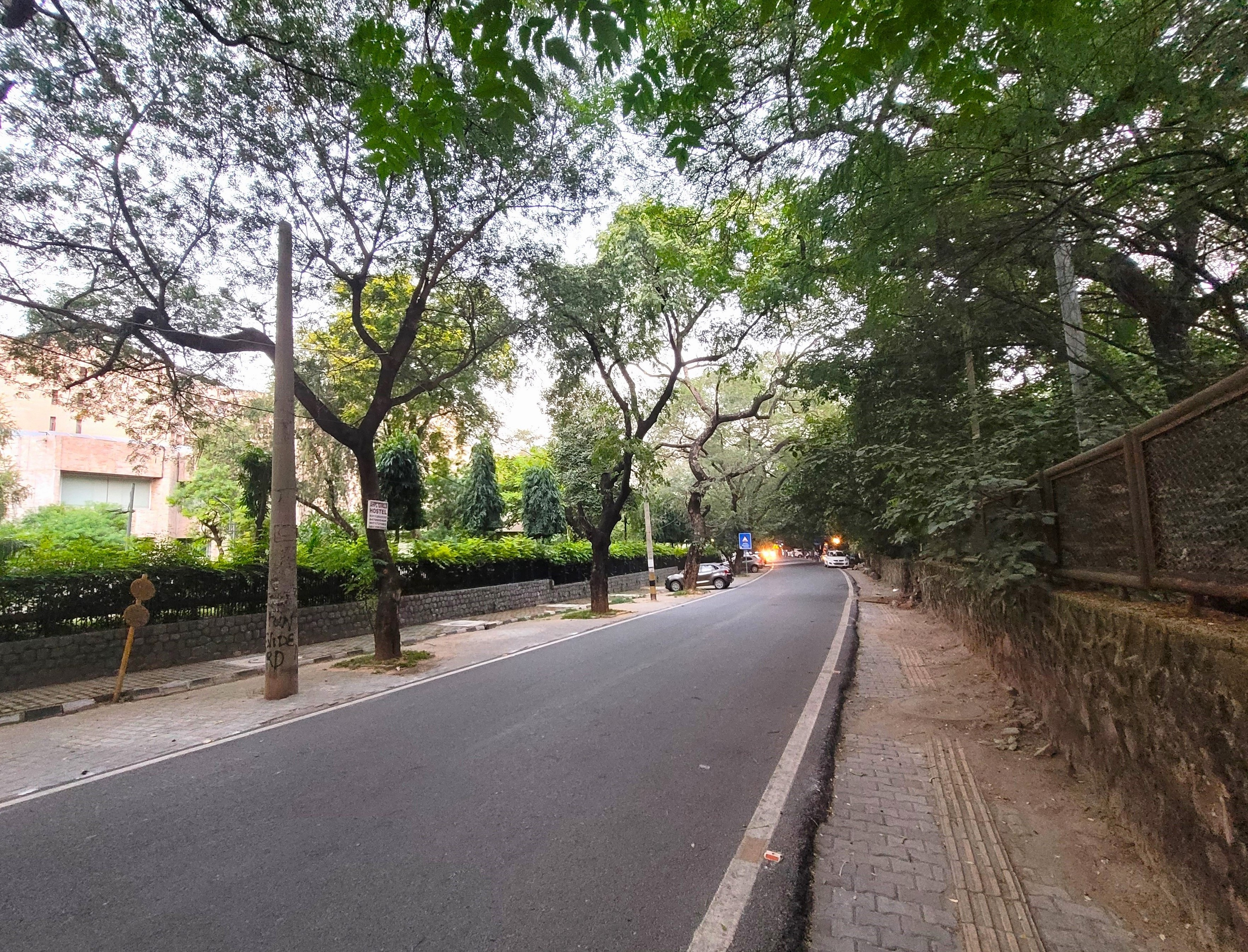
IIFT Delhi campus is on the left, Sanjay Van is on the right.

The IIFT Delhi campus is located in Qutub Institutional Area, overlooking green ridge and historical Qutub Minar. The campus is spread over 6.5 acres of land houses, two academic blocks and two residential blocks for students and visiting faculty.

=== IIFT Kolkata Campus ===
On August 2005 decision was taken to start new campus in city of Kolkata. IIFT's Kolkata Campus is located in East Kolkata, near Ruby Hospital, in a sprawling area of around 7 acres. The campus is developed as a green and fully integrated campus with independent blocks for academic, administration and student living areas with all modern amenities. The campus also houses three water bodies to maintain ecological diversity.

=== IIFT Kakinada Campus ===
In 2018, then Union Minister for Commerce and Industry Suresh Prabhu, in the presence of Chief Minister N. Chandrababu Naidu laid the foundation stone for 3rd campus of Indian Institute of Foreign Trade (IIFT) in Kakinada of East Godavari district at Andhra Pradesh. The State Government has allotted 25 acres land to build the Campus. Starting of IIFT full time 5 year integrated MBA(IB) Programme in a temporary premises at Kakinada has been approved.

Government of India has approved ₹25 crore for the construction of a permanent campus for the IIFT in Kakinada, Andhra Pradesh. This significant investment, announced on June 28, 2025, aims to expand and strengthen IIFT’s presence in southern India while enhancing the country’s international business education infrastructure. The ₹25 crore allocation will support the development of a modern, permanent campus in Kakinada, with classrooms and lecture halls, research and training facilities, Hostels and faculty accommodations, Spaces for industry collaboration. This upgrade marks a shift from the temporary setup, enabling IIFT to meet growing academic and operational demands.

=== IIFT GIFT City Campus ===
Union Commerce and Industry Minister Piyush Goyal, who is set to attend the 55th convocation ceremony in August 2022, had announced the setting up of the International IIFT Campus in GIFT City in the state of Gujarat.

=== Overseas Dubai Campus ===
In October 2024 an MoU has been signed between Vice-chancellor of IIFT and UAE Minister of State for International Cooperation Reem Al Hashimy and CEO of Expo City Dubai to establish IIFT's Dubai campus.

The Indian government has officially approved the IIFT's proposal to establish its first offshore campus in Dubai, a landmark decision announced on May 16, 2025. This approval, facilitated by the Ministry of Education, comes with no-objection certificates from the Ministries of Home Affairs and External Affairs, as well as the University Grants Commission (UGC). The move aligns with the National Education Policy (NEP) 2020, which promotes the internationalization of Indian education, and marks a significant step in expanding India's educational influence in the Gulf region.

=== Facilities ===
==== Hostel facilities ====
The full-time MBA (International Business) is a fully residential program.

==== Library ====
The institute has a collection of books by eminent authors on Trade, Economy, Management and WTO related issues. It also has a collection of journals, research reports, company reports, CD-ROMs, video cassettes, International Trade Statistics and Databases. Apart from books on traditional Management and Economics related areas, the library has a large collection of books on upcoming areas like WTO, Intellectual Property Rights, Services Management, Mergers & Acquisitions, Trade Finance, e-Business, Global Business Strategies, International Business Law, and Information Technology, etc. The library also subscribes to over 235 journals and periodicals and publications of national and international organizations such as the UN, ITC, UNCTAD, WTO, IMF, World Bank, Ministries and Departments of Government of India.

== Academics ==
=== Selection Process ===
Selection in IIFT is a four-pronged process:

1. The entrance test takes place in November, for admission in MBA; it is a computer-based test conducted by the National Testing Agency.
2. A short-list based on the test scores is used to invite students for a Group Discussion. Topics of national and international importance across social, political, economic and corporate domains are given as individuals are tested on their group discussion skills.
3. A Writing Ability Test is conducted to test the candidate's writing skills, along with knowledge of the subject and structure of representation.
4. A Personal Interview is done which has a distinct focus on goals, achievements, knowledge and awareness.

All of the three ability tests are normally held on a single day. A cumulative weighted score depending on the rules of that particular year of examination is taken to identify the final short-list of candidates separately for IIFT Delhi & IIFT Kolkata.

For admission in M.A. in economics (Specialization in Trade and Finance), an entrance test based on Economics and Finance is held. The final merit list along with the student's preference decides a short-list for IIFT Delhi & IIFT Kolkata.

=== International Collaborations & Student Exchange Programmes ===
IIFT Exchange Programme is an outcome of the institute's academic collaboration with institutions across the world. These collaborations are mainly for student, faculty exchange programmes, joint collaborations on research and various other capacity building exercises. IIFT has developed relations with many international organizations by signing MoUs and participating in their activities or taking collaborative initiatives. IIFT has international accreditation from Association to Advance Collegiate Schools of Business (AACSB). The institute is also a member of the following international organizations:

- Academy of International Business (AIB)
- Association of Management Development Institutes in South Asia (AMDISA)
- International Association of Trade Training Organization (IATTO)
- The European Foundation for Management Development (EFMD)

=== Rankings ===
University rankings

Business/Management – India
- NIRF (2022): 24
- NIRF (2023): 27
- NIRF (2024): 15

IIFT was ranked 60th in the world and 1st in India for International Trade education (Masters/MBA) in 2024 by QS World University Rankings. It was ranked 51st best B-school globally by LinkedIn in 2024, and in the same rankings it was ranked 1st globally in terms of its Networking capability.

IIFT was ranked 7th best B-school in India in 2024 by Indian Institutional Ranking Framework (IIRF). It was ranked 9th best B-school in India in 2023 by India Today. It was ranked as the most competitive B-school in India by Unstop (formerly Dare2Compete) for the year 2023.

=== Port Visit and Social Awareness Program ===
IIFT also offers its students opportunity to visit various national and international ports. Students can choose their port of choice and are accompanied by faculty members during the visit. This is in line with the goal of providing practical exposure to what is being taught in class.

The institute also has a month-long social awareness program, in which several NGOs such as Muskaan Foundation are invited to the campus to pitch their projects to the students. The students are then allowed to choose any NGO of choice and have to work closely with the NGO for the next month. The SAP is a part of the course curriculum, and IIFT is one of the few institutions who have undertaken similar social programs.

=== Papers and publications ===
The research carried out by the institute is widely disseminated in the form of study reports, monographs and occasional papers. The major beneficiaries of these research findings are academicians, policy makers, trade and industry, multilateral organizations, researchers and NGOs. In addition, the Institute publishes a quarterly journal Foreign Trade Review published by SAGE Publications. The journal focuses on key relevant areas such as international trade, finance, econometrics, IT, WTO, Trade blocs and marketing. Focus WTO, another quarterly journal published by the Institute focuses exclusively on WTO related issues. Each issue of the journal is thematic. An electronic magazine E-Zine is also published by the Centre for International Trade in Technology of IIFT.

== Organization and administration ==
=== Centres at IIFT ===
==== Centre for International Trade in Technology ====
It is an institution in which roles of active players in international technology trade especially those of Ministry of Commerce & Industry and Ministry of Science and Technology are proposed to be synthesised.

==== Centre for WTO Studies ====
The major objective of the centre has been to provide research and analytical support on a continuous basis to the Department of Commerce on identified issues pertaining to the World Trade Organization. In addition, it is also tasked to carry out research activities, bring out Publications on WTO related subjects, carry out Outreach & Capacity Building programmes by organising seminars, workshops, subject specific meetings etc., and to be a repository of important WTO documents in its Trade Resource Centres

==== Centre for Trade and Investment Law ====
The Centre for Trade and Investment Law (CTIL) was established in the year 2016 and the centre's primary objective is to provide sound and rigorous analysis of legal issues pertaining to international trade and investment law to the Government of India and other governmental agencies. Further, the Centre aims to create a dedicated pool of legal experts who could provide technical inputs for enhancing India's participation in international trade and investment negotiations and dispute settlement. In addition, the Centre aims to be a thought leader in the various domains of international economic law such as WTO law, international investment law and legal issues relating to economic integration.

==== Centre for MSME Studies ====
The growing importance of Micro, Small and Medium Enterprises in the economy as a whole and External Trade, in particular, has prompted IIFT to establish a separate Centre for MSME studies which can act as a catalyst to the internationalization of MSME activities. The center has become operational from 2005. The Centre for MSME Studies at IIFT provides continuous support to the MSME sector by carrying out activities which can be broadly classified into conducting Training Programmes, provision of Business Intelligence services through a Databank and acting as a catalyst for Interfacing with other concerned and associated institutions.

==== Centre for North-Eastern Studies (CeNEST) ====
North Eastern Council (NEC) has entered into an agreement with Indian Institute of Foreign Trade (IIFT) for the setting up of Centre for North Eastern Studies (CeNEST) at IIFT Kolkata Campus. The centre would facilitate the North Eastern states in policy making, strategic planning and effective implementation of various trade promotion schemes and undertake research and analysis on issues relating to international trade and business, capacity building and serve as a knowledge partner. It will help the states in exploiting the potentials of exports of the products from the region and promote innovations in business.

== Student life ==
The institute has a student body called International Management Forum (IMF). IMF is the official representative student body at IIFT which acts as a coordinator for, and provides administrative support to, various student activities and events at IIFT besides taking policy decisions regarding student affairs in consultation with the Director/Chairperson/Programme Director. Among the key roles of IMF is co-ordination and supervision of the activities of various domain-specific clubs and cells. 6 clubs and 7 cells work to ensure collaborative and comprehensive learning round the year. The clubs impart domain and industry-specific knowledge via Knowledge Transfer Sessions throughout the year. Also the practical learning experience is enhanced through the regularly scheduled competitions-case studies, Group discussions, quizzes, etc. Live projects from various corporates in all domains are also brought by clubs, which ensures significant industry exposure. The activities of the clubs and cells are supervised by the General Secretary, a member of the IMF.

== Notable alumni ==
- Vineet Joshi, IAS officer and Chairman of University Grants Commission
- Rashesh Shah, founder of Edelweiss Capital
- Ruchita Misra, author
- Sheikh Noorul Hassan, Member of the Legislative Assembly (India)
- Aashisha Chakraborty, author and management professional

== See also ==
- Indian Institutes of Management
