= Awadh Samman =

Award in India

The Awadh Samman is an award constituted by the Government of Uttar Pradesh, to honor exceptional and meritorious contribution in their chosen field/profession. Prominent recipients of award include Naushad, Lata Mangeshkar, Dilip Kumar, Dev Anand, Amitabh Bachchan, Ashok Kumar Udit Narayan and A R Rahman.

== Zee News Awadh Samman Awardees for 2012 ==
=== General Award ===
Name	Description	Field of Merit
K. A. Dubey Padmesh

=== Lifetime Achievement Award ===
Name	Description	Field of Merit
Bharat Bhushan (yogi)

=== Literature ===
Name	Description	Field of Merit
Ruchita Misra

== Zee News Awadh Samman Awardees for 2009 ==
Awards were presented at the Taj Hotel in Lucknow.

=== General Award ===
Name	Description	Field of Merit
Draupadi alias Duiji Amma	for increasing awareness amongst women mine workers	Social Service
Dr. T C Thakur	for Modern Agricultural Techniques Research	Agriculture
Dr Nalinaksh Vyas	IIT Kanpur	Science & Technology
Nayantara Sehgal	eminent writer	Literature
Rooprekha Varma	former VC of Lucknow University Professor who has made a notable contribution in the field of education	Education
Manjari Chaturvedi	for new experiments in Kathak	Dance
Dr Ramlakhan Singh	for specialized work on wild animals	Environment & Wild Life Conservation
Mohammed Shahid	for bringing laurels to India in Field Hockey	Sports
Vijay Jaddhari		Seed Conservation & Rural Development
Tapsi Kushwaha		Social Service & Environment
Manoj Sengar		Social Awareness
Upendra Srivastava	Education

=== Lifetime Achievement Award ===
Name	Field of Merit
Girija Devi	contribution to the world of Indian Classical Music
Birju Maharaj	contribution to the world of Kathak

=== Special Achievement Award ===
Name	Field of Merit
Yugratna Srivastava	for making a mark in the international arena in the field of Environment

== Sahara Awadh Samman Awardees for 2006 ==
Award was presented to recipients in a ceremony held at the Laxman Mela ground in Lucknow. Award included a Rs 1 Lakh & atrophy.

=== General Award ===
Name	Field of Merit
Hrithik Roshan	Cinema
Udit Narayan	Singer
Javed Siddiqui	Writer
Lalit Khaitan	Industrialist

== Radico Awadh Samman Awardees for 2005 ==
Award was presented to recipients in a ceremony in Lucknow.

=== General Award ===
Name	Field of Merit
Sharmila Tagore	film artist & chairperson of the Censor Board of India
Muzzafar Ali	filmmaker & designer

=== Naaz-e-Awadh ===
Name	Field of Merit
Muzzafar Ali	Chikankari & Zardozi
Meera Ali	Chikankari & Zardozi

== Sahara Awadh Samman Awardees for 2003 ==
Award was presented to recipients in a ceremony in Lucknow.,

=== General Award ===
Name	Field of Merit
Hrithik Roshan	Cinema
Malini Awasthi	Singer

== IAAC Awadh Samman Awardees for 2002 ==
Awards were by Governor Vishnu Kant Shastri presented in a ceremony held at the Laxman Mela ground in Lucknow.

=== General Award ===
Name	Field of Merit
Anil Kapoor	Cinema
Raveena Tandon	Cinema

== Awadh Samman Awardees for 2001 ==
Award was presented to recipients in a ceremony in Lucknow by Governor Vishnu Kant Shastri., The award included Rs. 1 lakh, a citation and a memento.

=== General Award ===
Name	Field of Merit
Ashok Kumar	Cinema
A.R.Rahman	Music
Javed Akhtar	Poetry/Lyrics

== Awadh Samman Awardees for 1999 ==
Award was presented to recipients in a ceremony in Lucknow.

=== General Award ===
Name	Field of Merit
Ali Sardar Jafri	–

== Awadh Samman Awardees for 1980 ==
Award was presented to recipients in a ceremony in Lucknow by Governor Vishnu Kant Shastri .

=== General Award ===
Name	Field of Merit
Amitabh Bachchan	Cinema
