= R. K. Mittal =

R. K. Mittal or Raj Kumar Mittal is Vice-Chancellor of Chaudhary Bansi Lal University, Bhiwani and has worked as Director-Development in Guru Gobind Singh Indraprastha University, Delhi. He is former Vice-Chancellor of Teerthanker Mahaveer University, Moradabad, Uttar Pradesh, India, at present appointed as Vice Chancellor of Babasaheb Bhimrao Ambedkar University (BBAU) Lucknow.
