= Ghanshyam Sarda =

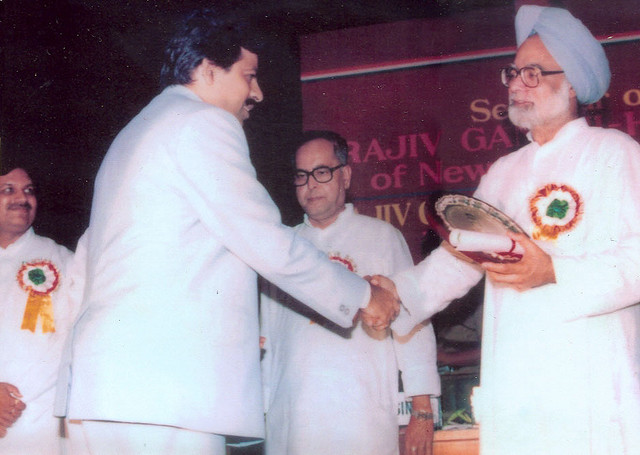
Ghanshyam Sarda receiving award from Honorable Prime Minister India

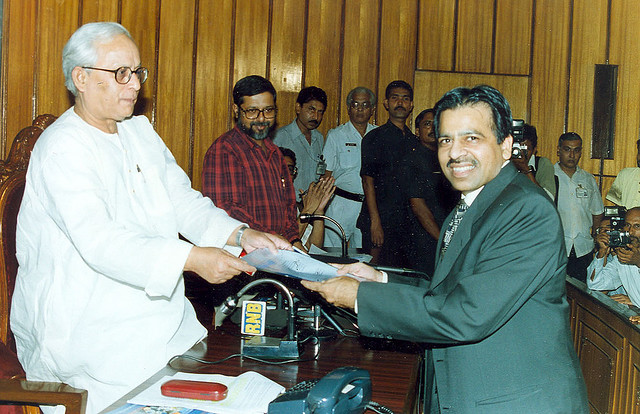
Ghanshyam Sarda with chief minister of West Bengal

Ghanshyam Sarda (born August 1959 in Calcutta, India) is a Calcutta-based businessman and owner of the Sarda Group of Industries, which operates mainly in the jute and IT industries. Alwar Jute Mill, Agarpara Jute Mill, Axsys Technologies, and Vision Comptech are all owned by the Sarda Group. He also has a charitable trust known as Chandakala Devi Trust.

== Businesses ==
The Sarda Group of Industries is scattered all over West Bengal and has her headquarters in Kolkata. The group currently has eight jute mills that together produce more than 500 tons of jute products daily. The recently opened Alwar Jute Mill in Rajasthan has an estimated investment of Rs 100 crore.

The Sarda Group was also the first business organization in India to set up professional training facilities for people working in jute mills. To date, Sarda group employs over 50,000 people and is one of West Bengal's largest employers. Apart from the field of business, Mr. Sarda also contributed to the state in various forms of events, sports and public affairs. Sarda has also been honoured for his work by many eminent personalities of the state.

== Expansion strategy ==
The Sarda Group has expanded its business to form a Pan-India presence in the field of jute goods manufacturing. The Group has acquired the JK Jute Mills in Kanpur. This unit has brought the production unit closer to the consumer. The mill produces jute bags in bulk order to sugar mills in Uttar Pradesh. Sarda has been a proponent of initializing refinement of the skills of the factory workers. He stressed that with the development of skills, the industry would meet the demands for eco-friendly products out of natural fibre. Recently, Sarda Group of Industries had started a venture to help Jute laborers to take care of their own health for their benefit.

Following the acquisition of the Kanpur mill, which has a capacity of 120 tones per day (TPD), the Sarda group's jute goods manufacturing capacity now stands at 560 tones per day. Apart from seven jute mills in Bengal, the group has set up plants in Bihar, Orissa and Andhra Pradesh. The group is setting up a mill in Rajasthan and is also planning a unit in Tamil Nadu.

== Investments ==
The Sarda Group acquired a 4% stake in GIC Housing, calling it a long-term investment. Ghanshyam Sarda said, "The global trend shows a great future for the housing finance companies". The investor-friendly approach of the new West Bengal government, led by Buddhadeb Bhattacharjee, has acted as a stimulant to the companies willing to set up shops and development centers in Bengal.
