= Ghanshyam Binani =

Ghanshyam Das Binani (born 1932 – died 1998) was an Indian Marwari industrialist, and was the President of Indian Non-Ferrous Metal Manufacturers Association. His company, Cominco Binani Zinc Ltd. became the first producer of primary zinc metal in India. As a tribute to his works, an Academy of Management Sciences associated with the Uttar Pradesh Technical University has been named after him. There is also an award, Ghanshyam Binani Children's Bravery Award, named after him and it is awarded by Binani's company Braj Binani.

== Life history ==
Binani (1932–1998) was an Indian Marwari industrialist, playing an active role in his father's ancestral business of trading in non-ferrous metals. He had been the President of Indian Non-Ferrous Metal Manufacturers Association and had also been on the committees of Indian Merchants Chambers and Federation of Indian Chamber of Commerce and Industry. He, along with his father, set up joint ventures with Revere Copper and Brass for Copper and Copper Alloy Extrusions and with Consolidated Mining & Smelting Company Ltd., Canada for manufacture of Electrolytic Zinc. With this came the birth of Cominco Binani Zinc Ltd., on 2 August 1962, promoted by Binani Metals Limited in Binanipuram on the banks of Periyar River in Kerala. Cominco Binani Zinc Ltd. became the first producer of primary zinc metal in the country and the first slab was cast on 21 April 1967. In line with their overall worldwide policy, Cominco Ltd. also withdrew as financial collaborators of the company on 3 May 1991, and the company was rechristened Binani Zinc Ltd.

There is an Academy of Management Sciences associated with the Uttar Pradesh Technical University named after him. There is also an award, Ghanshyam Binani Children's Bravery Award, named for him and it is awarded by Binani's company Braj Binani.
