= Ruchita Misra =

Indian author

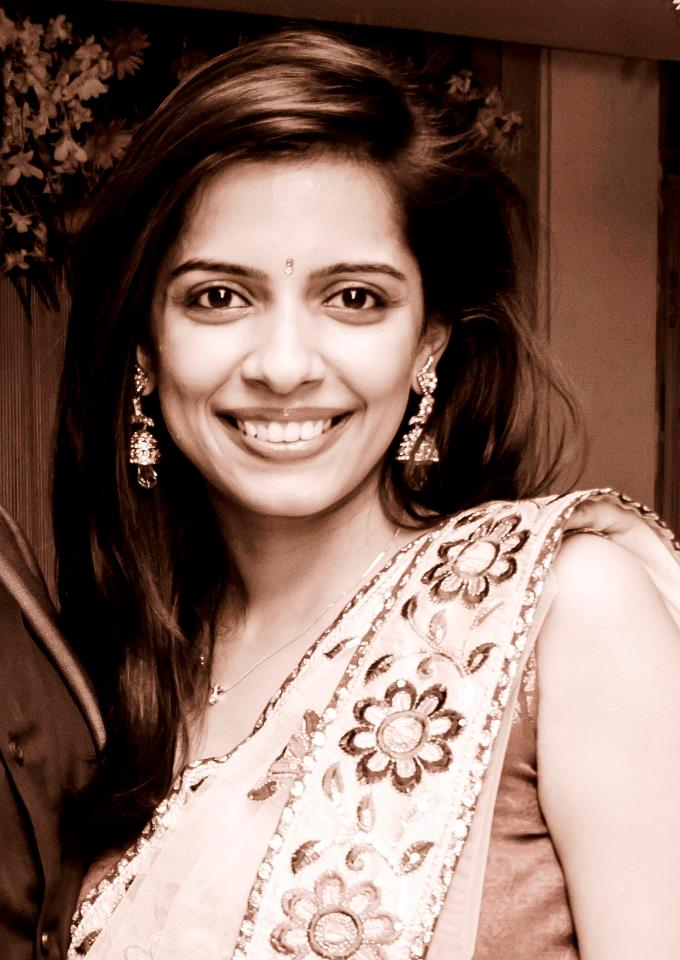
- Born: 2 February 1984 (age 42); Lucknow, Uttar Pradesh, India
- Citizenship: India
- Education: B.Tech (Information Technology), MBA
- Alma mater: Indian Institute of Foreign Trade, Institute of Engineering and Technology
- Occupations: Author, Speaker, Entrepreneur, Sales Director
- Writing career
- Language: English
- Notable awards: Awadh Samman
- Website: Ruchita Misra

Ruchita Misra is a British podcaster. She hosts and produces 'No Ordinary Life'. She is also an author. She was born and raised in Lucknow, Uttar Pradesh.

She was awarded the Awadh Samman in 2012 for her contribution to the field of literature by the Government of Uttar Pradesh.

At university, Ruchita was awarded three gold medals by the Indian Institute of Foreign Trade, New Delhi, and now lives in London.

== Early life and education ==
Ruchita Misra was born and brought up in Lucknow. She did her schooling from La Martinière College, Lucknow. Later she joined the Indian Institute of Foreign Trade for her MBA and was awarded three gold medals.

== Work ==
Ruchita is the host and producer of the video podcast 'No Ordinary Life', which is available on platforms including YouTube and Spotify.

Ruchita Misra has authored six books till date.

- The (In)eligible Bachelors (Rupa & Co., 2012)
- I Do! Do I? (HarperCollins, 2014)
- Second chance at Love (HarperCollins, 2015)
- Someone to Love (HarperCollins, 2016)
- Can This Be Love (HarperCollins, 2017)
- Her One True Love (Harper Collins, 2023)

== Awards ==
- Awadh Samman 2012: For her contributions to the field of Literature.
