= Madan Mohan Malaviya University of Technology =

State university in Gorakhpur, Uttar Pradesh, India

- Former name: Madan Mohan Malaviya Engineering College (1962–2012)
- Motto: Yogaḥ karmasu kauśalam
- Motto in English: "Excellence in action is yoga"
- Type: State University (Government)
- Established: 1962 (64 years ago)
- Accreditation: NAAC A Grade
- Chancellor: Governor of Uttar Pradesh
- Vice-Chancellor: Anupama Kaushik Sharma
- Undergraduates: 930 per year
- Location: Gorakhpur, Uttar Pradesh, 273010, India; 26°43′50″N 83°26′00″E
- Campus: 354 acres; Urban
- Website: www.mmmut.ac.in

Madan Mohan Malaviya University of Technology (MMMUT) is a state university in Gorakhpur, Uttar Pradesh, India. It was established in 2013 by upgrading Madan Mohan Malaviya Engineering College (MMMEC), which was established in 1962, into a university.

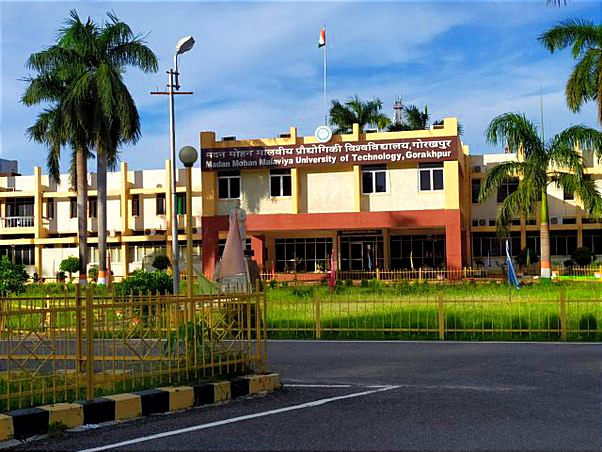
MMMUT Administrative Block, main building.

== History ==
MMMUT has its roots in Madan Mohan Malaviya Engineering College (MMMEC), established in 1962. In October 2012, the Government of Uttar Pradesh announced that it will upgrade the college into a residential university, quoting the lack of technical education in Uttar Pradesh since the Reorganisation of 2000, when Roorkee University went to Uttrakhand. The university was established a year later through the Uttar Pradesh Madan Mohan Malaviya University of Technology Act, 2013, which was passed by the government in September 2013.

== Admissions ==
Under Graduate Admissions

Undergraduate admissions until 2014 were being done through the Uttar Pradesh State Entrance Examinations SEE-UPTU, also known as UPSEE. Post the college was recognized as a State Technical University, the admissions to UG courses were taken through an admission test conducted by MMMUT named as Malaviya Entrance Test (MET). From the session 2021–2022, Joint Entrance Examination – Main (JEE-MAIN) conducted by the National Testing Agency (NTA) replaced the MET for future BTech (First Year) admissions in the university. It also offers bachelor in pharmacy through CUET entrance examination.

Post Graduate Admissions

Admission to the MTech programme is done based on Graduate Aptitude Test in Engineering- GATE Score of the candidate. Admission to courses like MCA and MSc were also taken by the Madan Mohan Malaviya University of Technology, Gorakhpur through the Malaviya Entrance Test (MET) till the academic session 2020–2021. The university has finally decided to take future admissions in its BBA, B.Pharm., BTech II (Lateral Entry), MBA, MCA, MTech in 12 specialization streams, and MSc courses through the Uttar Pradesh Combined Entrance Test (UPCET) from the academic session 2021–2022. The UPCET-2021 will also be conducted by National Testing Agency. UPCET is the replacement of UPSEE conducted earlier and is also referred to as Uttar Pradesh Joint Entrance Examinations (UPJEE). Reservation rules are followed in admissions as per the norms of UP Govt./MMMUT, Gorakhpur.

== Accreditation ==
In 2022, MMMUT was accredited with an A grade by the National Assessment and Accreditation Council (NAAC), the first state university in Uttar Pradesh to get this rank.

== Rankings ==
The National Institutional Ranking Framework (NIRF) ranked the university 84th in 2024. It increased its ranking to 60 in the 2025 rankings in Engineering category, 64 in University category, 23rd in state public University and Rank 99th in Overall.
