= SEE-UPTU =

The State Entrance Examination - Uttar Pradesh Technical University(SEE-UPTU) (formerly known as UPSEAT) is an annual college entrance examination in Uttar Pradesh for engineering, architecture, pharmacy and management courses. All institutions affiliated to Dr. A.P.J. Abdul Kalam Technical University (formally Uttar Pradesh Technical University) admit students through centralized counselling of SEE-UPTU. The private institutions may, however, admit 15% of the total intake directly. The exam is conducted by Dr. A.P.J. Abdul Kalam Technical University. It is one of the highly reputed exams of India.

== Examination format ==
As per the new format, it has two papers. The syllabus of the examination is based on topics covered by the Board of High School and Intermediate Education Uttar Pradesh, Central Board of Secondary Education and Indian School Certificate board examinations, though all topics are not included in the syllabus. The pattern of questions in the exam is almost fixed. Currently, the examination has objective type question paper for all the subjects and uses machine-readable Optical mark recognition answer sheets. There is no negative marking for incorrect answers.

== History ==
It was started in 1959.

== Seats ==
As per the statistics, the number of applicants, each year, is progressive. In 2008, the number of applicants almost touched 3,12,000. Whereas, in 2015, total 3,48,453 registrations are confirmed. There are many private and government institutions affiliated to aktu. As per statistics, to get a seat in a good government institutions, an applicant must have rank below 3000.

== See also ==
- List of colleges affiliated to Dr. A.P.J. Abdul Kalam Technical University
- Dr. A.P.J. Abdul Kalam Technical University (AKTU)
- JEE-Advanced, an entrance test for Indian Institutes of Technology
- JEE-Main, an entrance test for Engineering and Architecture courses other than IITs
