= Institute of Engineering and Technology =

Engineering college in Lucknow, India

Institute of Engineering and Technology, Lucknow
- अभियांत्रिकी एवं प्रौद्योगिकी संस्थान, लखनऊ
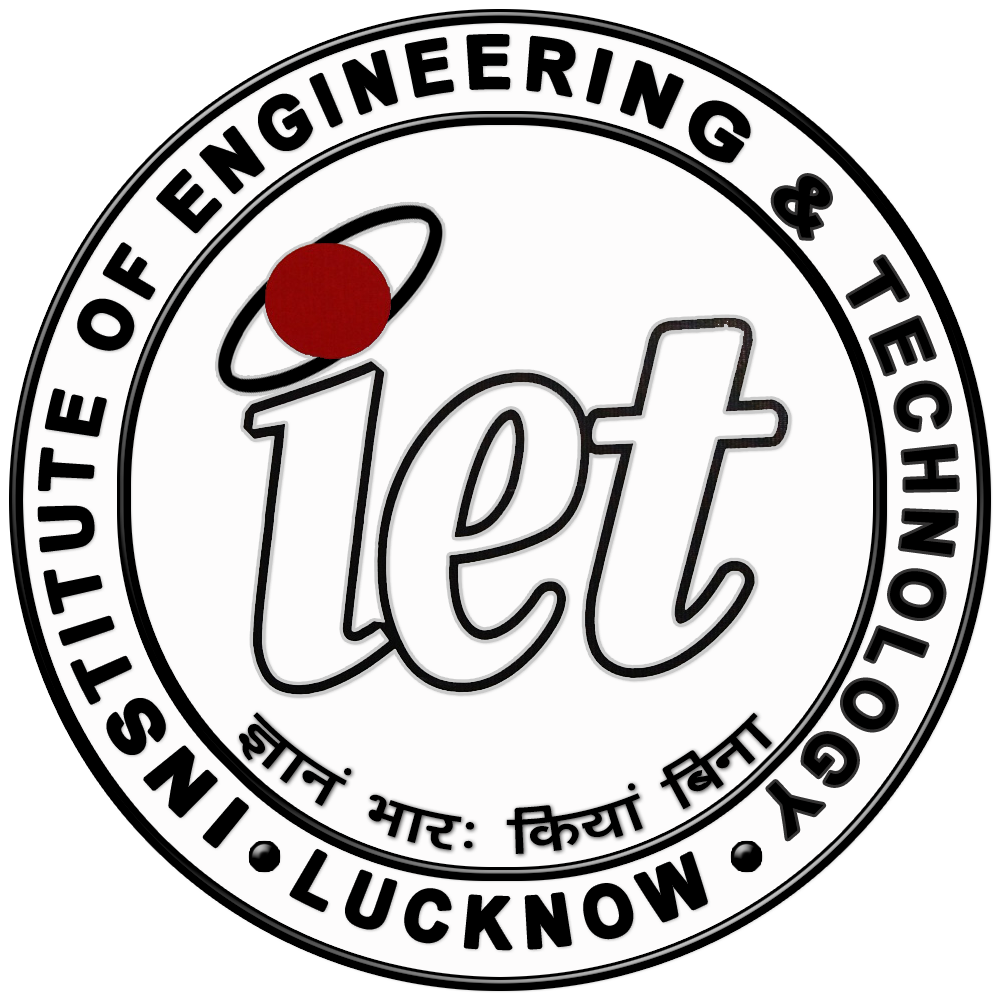
- IET logo
- Other name: IET
- Motto: Gyanam Bharah Kriyam Bina (Sanskrit)
- Motto in English: Knowledge is a load without Experiment
- Type: Government College
- Established: 19 November 1984; 41 years ago
- Academic affiliations: Dr. A.P.J. Abdul Kalam Technical University (earlier known as Uttar Pradesh Technical University and Gautam Buddh Technical University) (2000 – present); University of Lucknow (1984 – 2000)
- Director: Prof. Vineet Kansal
- Academic staff: 120
- Administrative staff: 350
- Students: 2806
- Undergraduates: 2168
- Postgraduates: 502
- Doctoral students: 136
- Location: Lucknow, Uttar Pradesh, 226021, India; 26.9143°N 80.9415°E
- Campus: Urban 100 acres (0.40 km^{2})
- Language: English, Hindi
- Website: www.ietlucknow.ac.in

Institute of Engineering and Technology, Lucknow (IET, Lucknow) is a state government-funded technical institute located in Lucknow, Uttar Pradesh, India. The institute was established in 1984 as the Faculty of Engineering of the University of Lucknow, and was subsequently reorganised as an independent institute. It is autonomous in nature and has been affiliated to Dr. A.P.J. Abdul Kalam Technical University since 2000.

== History ==
IET was established by the government of Uttar Pradesh in 1984, for imparting technical education. The institute is fully financed by Uttar Pradesh Government and is being administered by the executive committee of Dr. A.P.J. Abdul Kalam Technical University.

The institute is fully residential. The institute was formerly affiliated (1984–2000) to the University of Lucknow and from 2000 to 2012 to Uttar Pradesh Technical University. The institute had been a constituent college of Gautam Buddh Technical University (2010–2012). Currently it is under Dr. A.P.J. Abdul Kalam Technical University (2015–present). It is an autonomous Institute, recognized by AICTE and is NBA accredited.

IET Lucknow, started on 19 November 1984, began with the Faculty of Engineering and Technology of Lucknow University. Initially, it offered a B.Tech. degree in three branches - Computer Science, Electrical and Electronics. Within a year, two more branches - Civil and Mechanical - were introduced. Apart from this it has included Information Technology and Chemical branches as well. It has an MBA, M.TECH. and MCA course as well. The campus was constructed by Uttar Pradesh Rajkiya Nirman Nigam Ltd (UPRNN) on a 100-acre (0.40 km^{2}) plot purchased from the Lucknow Development Authority. UPRNN constructed a substation, academic block, eight boys' hostels, four girls' hostel and nearly 70 residences. LDA provided its support for construction of external roads, electric supply, drainage and sewage.

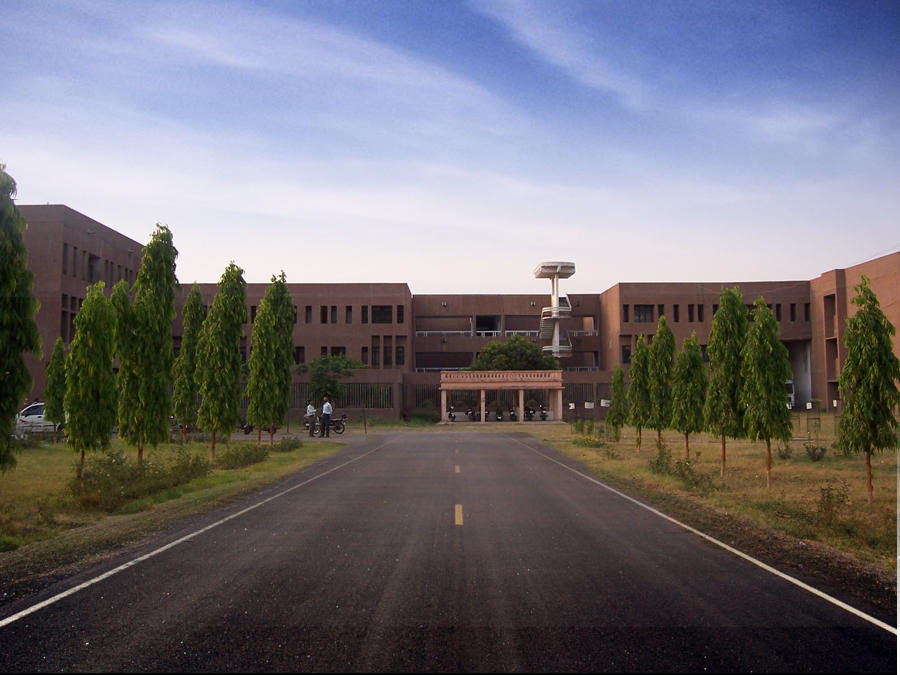
IET Lucknow

The founder Director, Prof. Suresh Chandra, joined on 26 June 1984 and the teaching faculty joined their posts from 11 October 1984 onwards. The Director, IET Lucknow, also assumed the office of Dean of Faculty of Engineering and Technology, Lucknow University on 25 April 1985.

== Hostel and accommodation ==
There are eight Boys' and four Girls' Hostels, accommodating around 2500 students. All the hostels are located within the institute campus. Each hostel has its own mess, managed by student representatives. Hostels are provided with Television, Water-Purifier, Water-Cooler, Geyser, and facilities for Indoor Games. Various hostels are Vishveshwaraiya Bhawan-A, Vishveshwaraiya Bhawan-B, Raman Bhawan-A, Raman Bhawan-B, Bhabha Hostel, Aryabhatt Hostel, Ramanujam Hostel, Ram Manohar Lohia Hostel, Gargi Bhavan (Girl's ' Hostel) Apala Hostel (Girl's Hostel) and Sarojni Bhawan (Girl's Hostel). A newly constructed 'Maitraiyee Hostel is ready for the allotment to the girl-students.

== Placement ==
The institute has a placement cell. which is headed by Dr. Arun Kumar Tiwari, Professor, Mechanical Department, IET Lucknow. The institute was granted an Industry Institute Partnership Cell in 1999 by the Ministry of Human Resource Development, Government of India. The Institutes Placement Cell is equipped with dedicated interview rooms, Group Discussion rooms, computer centers and presentation rooms helping recruiters have the highest art of facility.

== Departments ==
- Applied Science and Humanities Department
- Biotechnology
- Chemical Engineering Department
- Civil Engineering Department
- Computer Application
- Computer Science and Engineering
- Electrical Engineering Department
- Electronics and Communication Engineering Department
- Mechanical Engineering Department
- Self Finance Department

== Alumni ==
IET Lucknow Alumni Association or IETLAA was officially registered under the societies act on 25 May 2009. The association had its first General Body Meeting on 31 May 2009 at Scientific Convention Center, KGMU, Lucknow.

The Executive Committee of the association is an elected body that is responsible for its day-to-day operations. The association's constitution mandates an online election every two years to select new office bearers. The latest elections to the executive committee were held in July 2022. The alumni association operations are conducted on its official alumni website 'IETHUB'.

=== Alumni Speak series ===
One of the notable activities of IETLAA is to conduct a speaker series called the "Alumni Speak". This is an interactive program which aims to give exposure to the students and alumni about different fields of industry, academia and public service. The sessions include presentations by distinguished alumni on their respective fields and an account of their professional journey after graduating from IET. The program doesn't only help students to choose their career wisely, but also gives them an insight on the preparations required to achieve their goals.

=== Notable alumni ===
- Srijan Pal Singh, author
- Sharat Sinha, CEO of Airtel Business
- Ruchita Misra, author
- Laxmi Singh, first woman police commissioner of U.P.
