= Harcourt Butler Technical University =

STEM college in Kanpur, India

- Harcourt Butler Prāvidhika Viśvavidyālaya (Hindi - IAST)
- Former name: HBTI (Harcourt Butler Technological Institute)
- Motto: śrama eva paraṃ tapaḥ (Sanskrit - IAST) ɕrəmə eːvə pərⁿ t̪əph (IPA)
- Motto in English: "Work Indeed is Great Austerity"
- Type: State University (IN)
- Established: 1921 (105 years ago)
- Founder: Sir Spencer Harcourt Butler
- Accreditation: NAAC A+ Grade
- Chancellor: Governor of Uttar Pradesh
- Vice-Chancellor: Dr. Samsher
- Location: Hastings Ave., Nawabganj, Kanpur, Uttar Pradesh, 208002, India
- Campus: 323 acres (131 ha); Urban
- Language: English
- Colours: Royal Blue #002366; Sage Green #aac588 Racing Red #bb0000
- Website: hbtu.ac.in

Harcourt Butler Technical University (HBTU), formerly Harcourt Butler Technological Institute (HBTI), is a reputed and old STEM college currently functioning as a public technical university, and is located in Kanpur, Uttar Pradesh, India. Established in 1921, it is one of India's oldest engineering institutes, India's second institute for industry-oriented applied science, and also India's first technological institute for higher research in technical chemistry. (Note: Technical Chemistry focuses on applying chemical principles to design materials or processes in industrial or technological areas.)

It is named after its visionary and relentless proponent-in-chief Sir Spencer Harcourt Butler, a highly regarded ICS officer and Governor in British India, who preferred to be addressed as "Harcourt Butler". As an advocate of industrial advancement, Sir Harcourt was a promoter of technical education in general, and the patron of "Technological Institute" in particular. Originally, the institute aimed to train science graduates for pursuing career as technologists, or starting their own industrial venture.

It has historical and foundational connections to many scientific entities. It is the parent of the National Sugar Institute which operated from HBTI campus from 1936 to 1963. The Central Control Laboratory (for Ghee, Edible oils, and Vanaspati) started in HBTI in 1937. HBTI also housed ICAR's Sugar Technologist (1930-36), and provincial govt's offices of Glass Technology (1942–91) and Alcohol Technology (estd. 1953). It assisted three new state-govt colleges - Rajkiya Engineering College (REC) Bijnor (started in 2010 as BRAECIT), REC Kannauj (started in 2015), and REC Mainpuri, (started in 2015). And, when IIT Kanpur was established in 1959, its classes, starting 9 August 1960, were initially held in HBTI until IITK had its own campus.

== History ==
=== Origins ===
In early 1900s, there was a need for application of science in industry in the United Provinces of Agra and Oudh, and technical education was paramount. On the initiative of Harcourt Butler, the Secretary to Industrial Committee (1907-08) and DC of Lucknow, the 1907 Industrial Conference at Naini Tal convened by the Lt.Gov. of the province, Sir John P. Hewett, GCSI, KBE, CIE, recommended establishment of a Technological Institute at Cawnpore. Therein, Thomason's Principal Sir Edwin H.deV. Atkinson, KBE, CIE, RE, opined on location of the institute, and views of Upper India Chamber of Commerce (UICC) were expressed by their Secretary, Alexander B. Shakespear, CIE. (Note: Alexander Blake Shakespear was Manager, and then Director, at the managing agency Begg, Sutherland & Co., Cawnpore (Shakespear Family).)

The conference approved teaching and research via four chemical sections (of four students each) in industries of leather, sugar, acid-n-alkali, and textile-n-papermaking (dyeing, bleaching, etc.). In 1908, Sir Harcourt left UPA&O, and the provincial secretary (and future CAG), Sir Robert W. Gillan, KCSI, submitted the scheme to the government. But, the India Secretary deferred, and sought opinions from Dr. Morris W. Travers, FRS, DSc, among others, regarding overlaps with IISc, and relevant areas of instruction and enquiry. However, it was generally accepted that a colloquial Central Higher Technical Institute be set-up in two branches. The Rurki Branch would take over Thomason's engineering courses while the Cawnpore Branch would be the industrially accessible Technological Institute.

By 1914, the idea of starting it as a British Polytechnic was abandoned, and industry-oriented applied research became the keynote, with some provision of teaching courses of practical importance to regional industries. Deferments also happened due to World War I, apart from differing opinions, and lack of funds. By mid 1910s, an IISc-like central higher research institute under Imperial control in North India was steadily demanded not only by industrialists and professionals, (Note: One such industrialist was Charles Turner Allen, CIE, the Co-Founder of The Pioneer newspaper, and son of the Co-Founder of Cooper, Allen & Co., Cawnpore (Jacob Family). The list of keen professionals included Caetano Mariie de Souza who was the Director of Premier Oil Mills, shareholder of Oberoi hotels, and owner of Dwyer Limestone (Gray-ons).) but also by officials like the Director of Industries (DI) A.H. Silver.

Indian businessmen wanted training in leather chemistry as Kanpur had leather industry since 1800s. Contrarily, officials like Director (LR&A) H.R.C. Hailey, CSI, OBE, CIE, (Note: Hammett Reginald Clode Hailey was an ICS Officer, and Director of Land Records and Agriculture (LR&A) in UPA&O in 1912-20 (Cotes Family, and The Gazette UK).) and Offg. DI & DD (Agri.) Sir Bryce C. Burt, CIE, MBE, FCS, concurred with European industrialists and UICC that the proposed institute should focus on research in applied chemistry, and offer special branches only on demand. The Indian Industrial Commission (1916–18) headed by Sir Thomas H. Holland, KCSI, KCIE, FRS, DSc, recommended that technological institutes should be controlled by provincial Director of Industries to facilitate research in regional industries. A representative committee recommended that training be provided for research chemists, and technical chemists (in oil, textile, and leather).

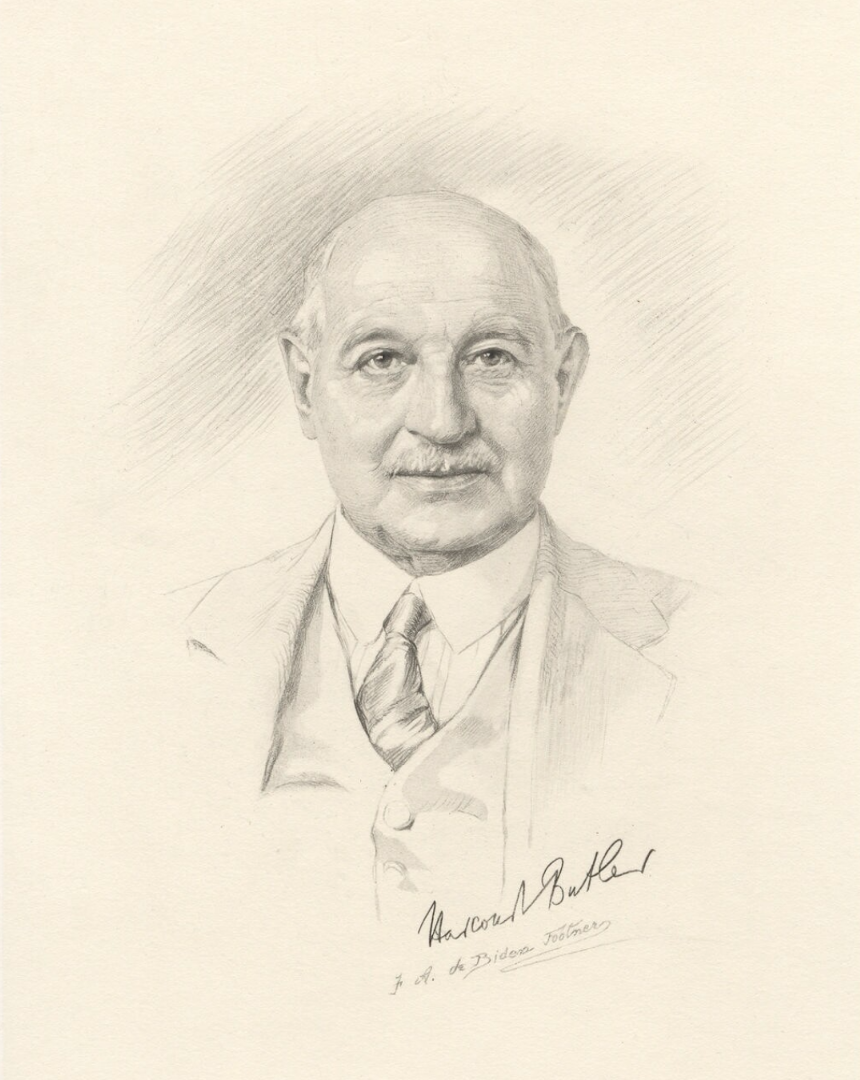
Sir Spencer Harcourt Butler, c.1934

=== GRI and GTI ===
Sir Harcourt returned to UPA&O in 1918 as Lieutenant-Governor, and expressed dismay at the delays in starting the institute. Ultimately, Government Research Institute, Cawnpore, was launched in January 1920, offering industrial research without teaching any courses. It was headed by the Agricultural Chemist Dr. Harold Edward Annett, OBE, FIC, FCS, DSc, (Note: Dr. Harold Edward Annett was also Member of South Eastern Agricultural College (M.S.E.A.C.), a famous college of agricultural sciences in 18th-19th centuries (BAHS article).) then the Principal of Opium Research Laboratory, of which GRI was an adjunct. It was housed in two rooms of Sher Wali Kothi, a British era bungalow near Nawabganj.

The distinguished dye scientist Dr. Edwin Roy Watson, DSc, Professor at Dacca College, was appointed as Research Chemist. Dr. Watson had been research assistant to Charles T.R. Wilson (who won 1927 Physic Nobel prize), and Siegfried Ruhemann (who discovered Ninhydrin in 1911) at University of Cambridge (1903-04). He was aided by two Asst. Res. Chemists - his DC colleague Kshitish Chandra Mukherji, AIC, and Dr. Nitya Gopal Chatterji, DSc, DIC, AMIChemE (who did DSc under four-times Nobel nominee N.L. Dhar at University of Allahabad). Dr. Watson became the Principal of GRI as Dr. Annett was appointed Officiating Principal of Govt Agricultural College.

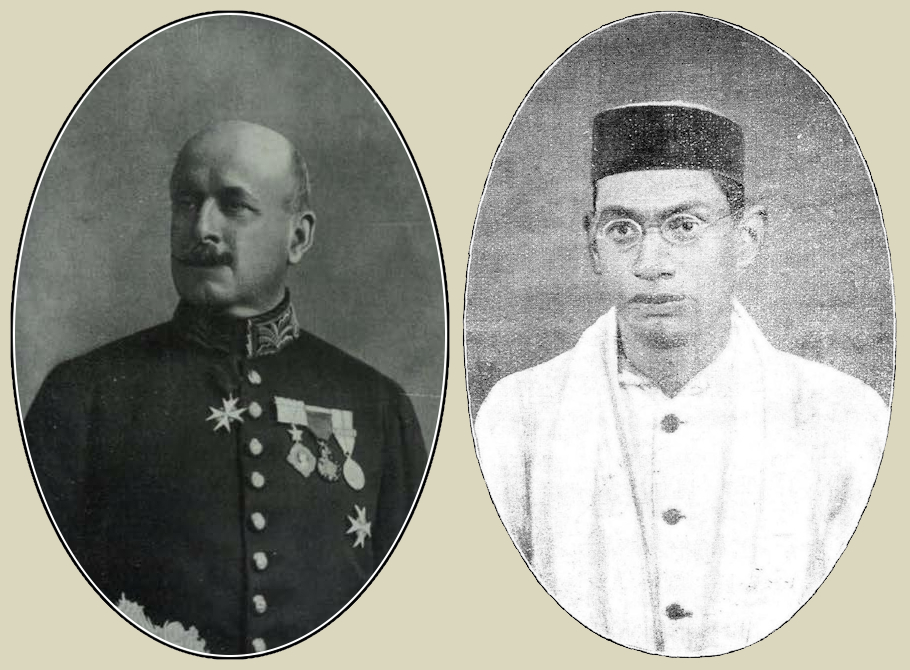
(L) Sir J.P. Hewett, c. 1907; (R) Sir C.Y. Chintamani, c. 1911

In 1921, Sir Harcourt became the (first) Governor of UPA&O. He appointed Sir C.Y. Chintamani, LLD, the Chief-Editor of The Leader newspaper, as the Minister of Education and Industries. With active support from the keen minister in UPA&O Legislative Council, the institute secured funding for and started teaching three-year postgraduate diploma courses apart from their activities in applied research, and became the Government Technological Institute.

The institute started with two Chairs each in three areas of applied chemistry: oil, tinctorial, and leather. Dr. E.R. Watson was appointed as the first Principal (1921–26) of GTI. On 25 November 1921, Sir Spencer Harcourt Butler, GCSI, GCIE, DL, FRGS, FRAS, formally laid the foundation-stone of the Main Building. Sir Harcourt had envisioned to make it a full-fledged technological university, but had to leave charge in UPA&O to go to Burma in 1922.

"The institute will have two sides, instruction and research. They must operate and energise together. [...] The work of the institute will take time. The professors must be given a reasonably free hand. But they must not lose touch with the world of business and the practical conditions of industry.

Let our motto be 'on and ever on'. The outlook is favourable. The site of the new institution is within easy reach of the great industrial centre of Cawnpore, rich with capacity and experience. [...] I will set no limits in my imagination to the future progress of Cawnpore or the United Provinces. I will not admit one argument against their destiny."

— Sir Harcourt Butler at the Foundation-Stone Laying Ceremony

=== Initial years ===
The first batch of PG Diploma in Technology ("Dip.Tech.") consisted of three students each in two courses of General Applied Research ("Gen Res"), and Oil Chemistry & Technology ("Oil Tech"). Due to lack of infrastructure, they were sent to the Govt Technical School (under principalship of P.A. Lyons) in Lucknow for a six-month preliminary course in mechanical engineering. The first classes & laboratories were held in two buildings (later, the erstwhile Forest View Hostel) of the old govt soda factory, and the first hostel was a Nawab's bungalow in Souterganj near the Govt School of Dyeing & Printing (GSDP, (Note: A reference to GSDP (estd. 1914) can be found in an old The Tribune newspaper article.) later a GCTI constituent).

In 1922 the institute moved its operations to the new bungalows in Luxman Bagh - Bungalow No. 1 for "Gen Res", Bungalow No. 2 for workshop (with pilot plant), Bungalow No. 3 for "Oil Tech", and Bungalow No. 4 for hostel. By 1925, the north-wing of Main Building was completed, and a temporary hostel was constructed behind the central hall. In 1926, under the then Minister of Industry, Sir M.A.S. Khan, GBE, KCSI, KCIE, the generically monikered GTI took the name Harcourt Butler Technological Institute in honour of its patron, though Sir Harcourt was absent, working as the (first) Governor of British Burma.

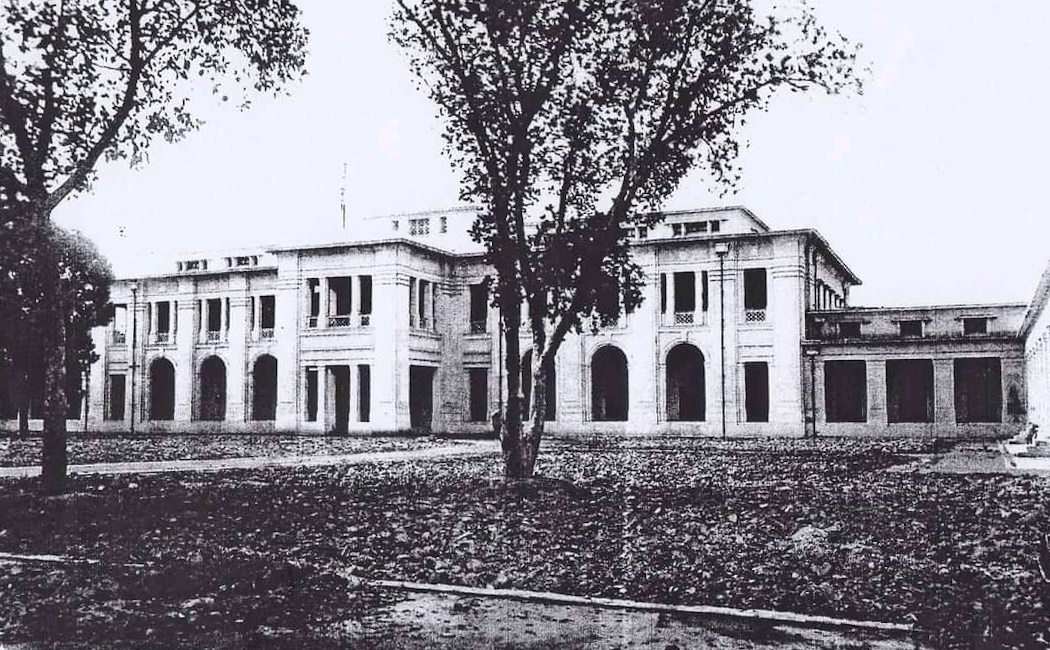
Old Photograph of Main Building

As Richardson Committee prioritized leather over sugar, a third course of Leather Chemistry & Technology was started in 1922 under Madhav Balkrishna Hudlikar. A course in Tinctorial Chemistry was also considered. In 1924, the Department of (Applied) Chemistry was established, and all six students of the first batch also received their PG diplomas. Though, grading and classification criteria based on test scores was only finalised a year later in 1924-25. A fourth course of Sugar Chemistry & Technology was started in July 1926. Dr. Gilbert J. Fowler, FIC, FRSI, DSc, who held the Chair of Biochemistry at IISc (first in India and The East), became the Officiating Head of chemical research in 1926, and then Principal of HBTI in 1927.

Academically, the first-year included a short course in mechanical engineering followed by instructions in applied chemistry. Second-year onwards, special branches were taught. HBTI emphasised practical training in simulation plants and commercial factories. Admissions were done through competitive exams (written and oral). The oil course developed an excellent reputation while the sugar course became popular. Post-diploma courses, two-year studentship and three-year fellowship, were also introduced within the first decade. The head(s) of technology section(s) worked de facto as area Expert(s) to the Industries Department, while the head of chemical research worked as Industrial Chemist to the provincial government.

=== Reforms ===
During ministership of Sir J.P. Srivastava, KCSI, KBE, DSc, the Director of Industries was made the ex-officio Principal in 1932, and an Acting Principal was to be the head. NASI Founder-Fellow and industrial researcher Dr. H.D.H. Drane, DSc, AMIEE, AMIChemE, (Note: Dr. H.D.H. Drane was Research Engineer at Thermal Syndicate Ltd in Wallsend (UK), the manufacturers of Vitreosil® branded fused silica products (Grace's Guide). In 1930s, he lived in the Brooksland House, a Georgian Regency era Grade II listed building in Greenwich (BLB). Also, he retired from British Army as Honorary Major in April 1945. He was Second Lieutenant in Royal Engineers, and War Substantive Captain in the Regular Army WW2 Emergency Commissions (The Gazette UK, Fold3).) was the last British Principal, and Dr. J.A.H. Duke, (Note: Dr. Joseph Algernon "Algie" Hare Duke later became the Deputy Director of Industries (UPA&O), and was also awarded the 1935 King George V Silver Jubilee Medal (Forces War Record).) the Oil Expert, was appointed the first Acting Principal of HBTI. Also, the three-year "Dip.Tech." was replaced by a two-year PG course for an Associate of HBTI (A.H.B.T.I.), and a further two years of studies for a Fellow of HBTI (F.H.B.T.I.). The "Gen Res" and leather courses were discontinued in 1932 on the recommendations of the second Mackenzie Committee. Short courses and non-diploma courses were also started in 1932-33 session.

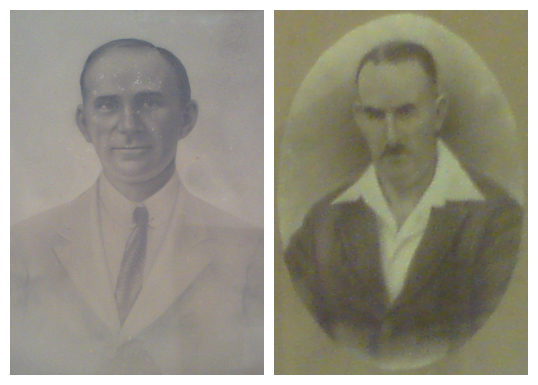
(L) Dr. E.R. Watson, first principal; (R) Dr. J.A.H. Duke, first acting principal

In 1932-34, ICAR was proposed to take over the oil section to make an all-India institute of oil technology, and in 1936 the sugar section was taken over to establish the Imperial Institute of Sugar Technology on the recommendations of Indian Sugar Committee, and others. Student enrolment crossed the three-figure mark to 106 in the year 1936-37. The first Indian Actg. Principal, Rao Saheb Dattatraya Yeshwant Athawale, officiated from 1937 to 1947, followed by Dr. D.R. Dhingra, ARIC, in the first decade post-independence from 1947 to 1957. An R&D scheme, and a short-course on essential oils were started in the latter's tenure

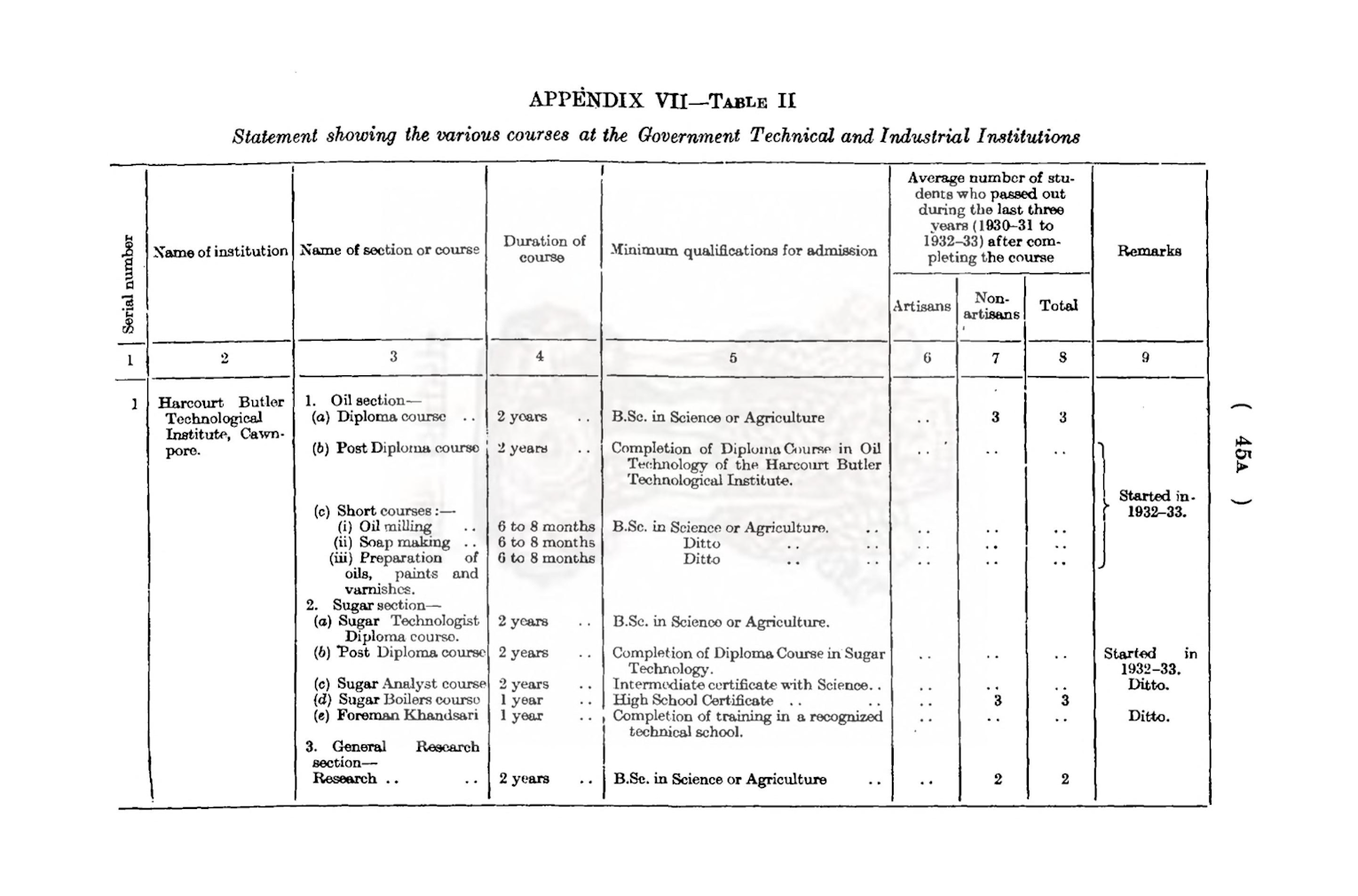
HBTI courses, c. 1933-34

In 1952, a committee headed by Sir J.C. Ghosh, DSc, FNI, advised that HBTI operate as a university college with IIST, GCTI, and GLI (Note: Government Leather Institute (GLI) was founded in 1941, taking over from Government Leather Working School (GLWS) of 1916 (GLI History).) as integral parts, and offer new courses. But, it was not implemented, except for a course (India's second) in Chemical Engineering in 1954. AICTE review in 1955 suggested teaching reorganisation, and in 1956, faculty posts separate from Experts/Chemists were sanctioned. Dr. Hrishikesh Trivedi became the first Indian-origin Principal when the post was revived in 1957. HBTI was affiliated to Agra University in 1958, and AHBTI/FHBTI diplomas were converted to degrees: a four-year B.Sc. (Chem. Engg.) to be pursued post I.Sc. (HSC), and a three-year B.Sc. (Tech.) post B.Sc.

=== Expansion ===
HBTI widened the spectrum of its activities in the 1960s. The M.Sc. (Tech.) courses and an Industrial Research Centre were started in 1960, along with appointment of a Head of Oil Technology, and completion of Lake View Hostel. The state's industrial-advisor and MIT/SEAS alumni Dr. Chittaranjan "CR" Mitra became Principal in 1962. The departments of Physics and Mathematics were started in 1961, while those of mechanical, electrical, and civil engineering were started in 1964-66. India's first courses in Biochemical Engineering and Chemical Engineering Practice were launched in 1964 and 1965 respectively. And, HBTI organised India's first seminars in Biochemical Engineering ('67) and Biomedical Engineering ('68) under the pioneer Dr. Tarun K. Ghosh.

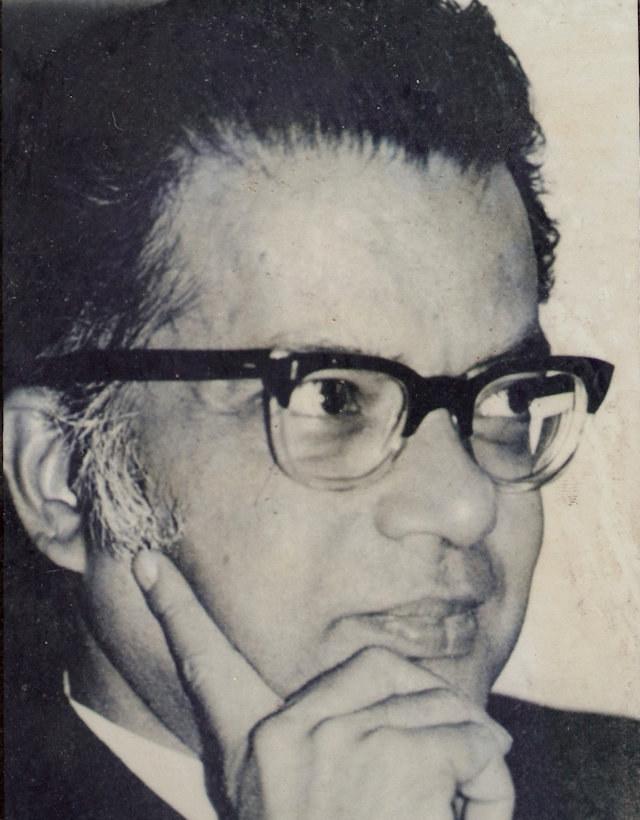
Dr. CR Mitra, first director

On 26 March 1965, the GoUP made HBTI an autonomous institution registered as a society. Accordingly, it got a Board of Governors, and the post of Principal raised to Director. Dr. Mitra became the first Director in 1965, and remained till 1969 (when G.D. Birla invited him to lead BITS Pilani). The college's affiliation was transferred to Kanpur University in 1967 on the latter's inception. On AICTE's 1967 recommendations, GoI sanctioned grants for development of HBTI, which led to many new infrastructure projects by 1972-73.

By 1970s, HBTI had transformed from an instructor in chemical branches to a prominent institute of higher education in STEM fields. The Science & Technology Entrepreneur's Park (STEP-HBTI) was launched on-campus in 1986 to encourage entrepreneurship, sponsored by DST (GoI), ICICI, and IFCI. In 1991, all B.Sc. (Engg/Tech) courses were changed to four-year B.Tech., and all M.Sc. (Tech) were changed to two-year M.Tech., in keeping with the times.

=== 21st century ===
In 2000, the GoUP established the Uttar Pradesh Technical University (UPTU), and HBTI was affiliated to it in 2001. This made HBTI lose the autonomous status which it had retained in previous affiliations. However, HBTI worked for, and later became the only STEM college in Uttar Pradesh to be granted the academic autonomy by the University Grants Commission on 27 February 2008, a status it had lost a decade earlier. While still affiliated to UPTU administratively, the institute could now conduct its own internal academic affairs independently, viz., syllabus, exams, grading, etc.

By 2000s, HBTI's infrastructure had become inadequate and degraded. There was also worsening of student–teacher ratio due to unfilled vacancies, faculty leaving for new CFTIs, etc. Mismanagement and failures increased even in important activities. Hence, its reputation suffered against some NITs. The alumni offered financial assistance to resolve immediate issues, but it could not be initiated due to government regulations. UPTU plans to develop it as a STEM CoE did not materialize either. In this period (2001-21), HBTI did not have any long-term permanent head, either short-term ones or mostly temporary "Acting" ones.

On 1 September 2016, HBTI was raised to the status of a technical state-university by the UP HBTU Act, 2016 (dated 7 April 2016), and its name was modified to Harcourt Butler Technical University. Prof. M.Z. Khan was appointed as the first Vice-Chancellor. HBTU obtained administrative autonomy, and some much needed infrastructure upgrades were started. In 2021, the college completed its centenary, and the then VC Dr. Samsher requested the President of India to make HBTU a central university.

== Campus ==
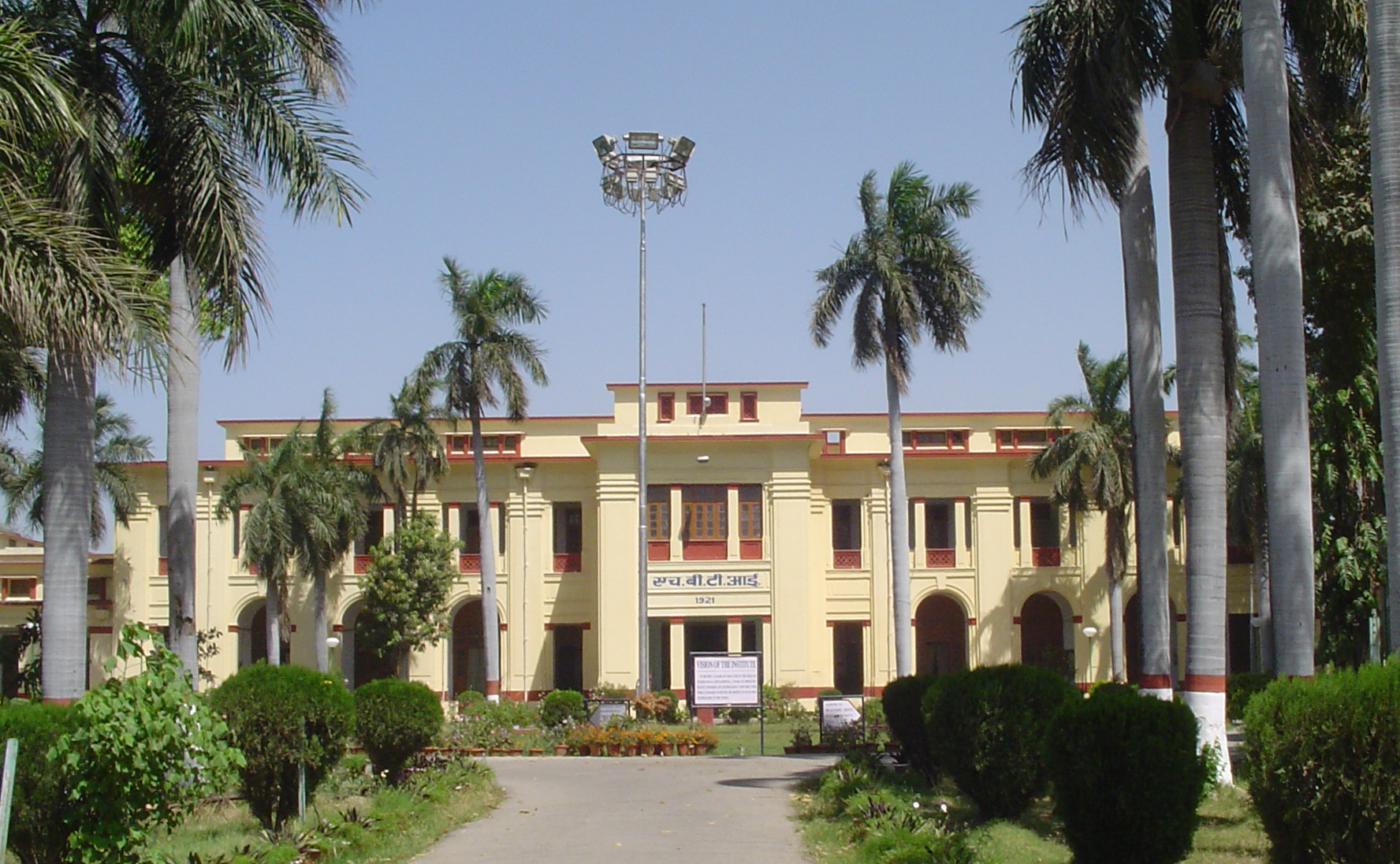
HBTI Main Building, c. 2004

The university is on the Hastings Avenue in Nawabganj area in the northern outskirts of the metro-city of Kanpur, officially in the Kanpur Nagar district. It is situated between the Kanpur Zoo and the Company Bagh Chauraha (crossing), about 4 km from the Kanpur Ganga Barrage, and within 2 km of the Ganga river. It is spread across two campuses – the East campus (74.84 acres), and the West campus (248.64 acres), roughly 3 km apart. The East Campus is primarily academic with limited accommodation facilities, while the West campus is entirely residential.

=== East campus ===
The East Campus has its main entrance gate opposite the CSA Univ. of Agriculture premises on the Agricultural College Lane. The other gate on the opposite side of campus faces the Azad Nagar locality. It is 3 km of the Rawatpur railway station, 3 km from the Rawatpur metro station (on Orange Line), 8 km from the Kanpur Central railway station, and 9 km from the Kanpur Central ("Jhakarkati") Bus Station.

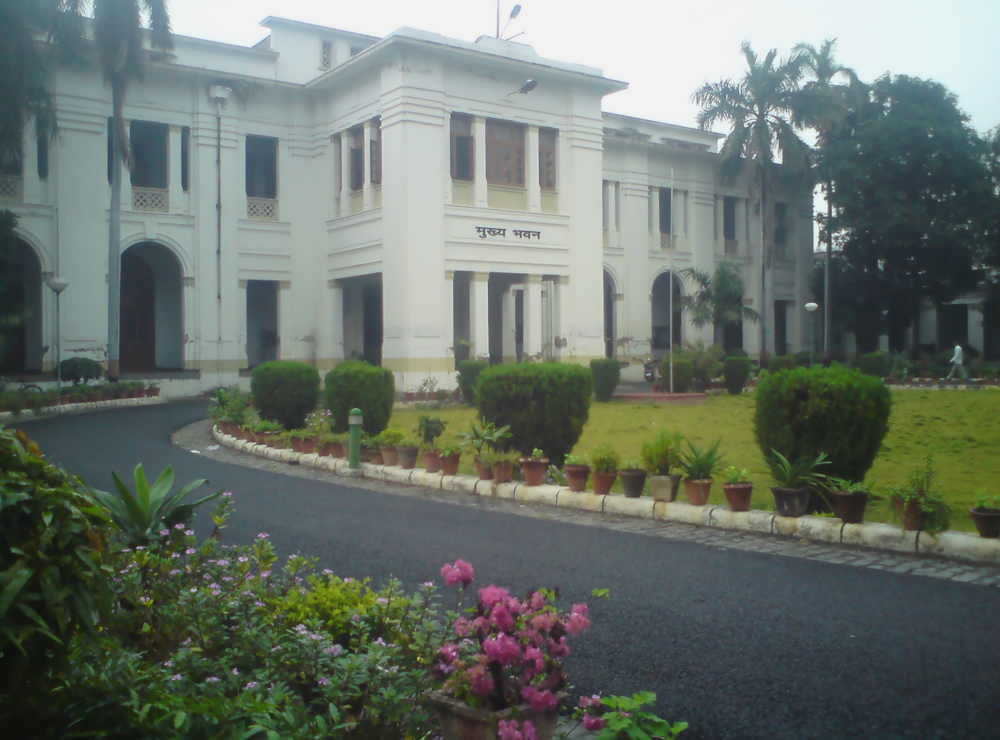
HBTI Main Building, c. 2010

The Main Building, in use since 1925, houses the administrative offices, classrooms, halls, MOOC recording studio, and departments of Sciences, Chemical Technology (five out of six branches), and Humanities. Seven other independent buildings house the departments of engineering (six fields), and Leather Technology. The Central Workshop (finished 1957) consists of seven shops: Foundry, Welding, Machine, Sheet Metal, Blacksmithy, Carpentry, and Fitting-&-Benchworking. It once also had a state of the art industrial-grade oil mill, a sugar plant, a soap-factory, and manufacturing machines for paint and varnish.

The Tagore Central Library is an independent building. It offers a web-based OPAC catalogue with 83,000+ books, and 25,000+ journals & periodicals. The library provides access to e-journals like the ACS, J-Gate, IEEE, Springer Nature, and Web of Science database. It also offers e-books from leading publishers, along with E-ShodhSindhu (eSS) subscriptions, like NDLI eBooks/archives, and ShodhShuddhi PDS system.

This campus also has the offices of several engineering and technology organisations of national repute. It has the headquarters of Oil Technologists' Association of India (OTAI), the central regional office of Council of Leather Exports (CLE), the Kanpur Local Centre of Institution of Engineers (India) (IEI), the Kanpur Regional Centre of Indian Institute of Chemical Engineers (IIChE), and the headquarters of the Paint and Coating Technologist Association (PACT).

All female hostels are in this campus, namely, Alaknanda Hostel (GH-I), Mandakini Hostel (GH-II), Gangotri Hostel (GH-III), Bhagirathi Hostel (GH-IV, and formerly Lake View III, "LV New"), Kaveri Hostel (GH-V), and Saraswati Hostel (GH-VI). There are also two male hostels - Shridharacharya Hostel (Lake View I & II, "LV Old"), and Ramanujan Hostel. Additionally, it has a few residential quarters for staff, and a Central Bank of India branch (with ATM).

=== West campus ===
The West Campus is on Indra Road, opposite Deen Dayal Nagar locality, and around 1 km from the Gurudev Chauraha (and same name metro station). It is on the other side of the Kanpur Zoo with reference to the East Campus. This land was acquired in 1965 to expand the institute.

The West Campus features several male hostels - Abdul Kalam Hostel (WCH-I), Visveswaraya Hostel (WCH-II), Raman Hostel (WCH-III), Ambedkar Hostel (DBRA-I), Aryabhatt Hostel (DBRA-II), and Vishwakarma hostel (WCH-IV). It also has the VC residence, VC camp office, multi-purpose hall (Shatabdi Bhawan), new gymnasium, community centre, a State Bank (SBI) ATM, postal facilities, and residential quarters for faculty and staff. There are also playing grounds for cricket, football, hockey, basketball, and volleyball.

== Administration ==
Principals of HBTI
Name	Years
E.R. Watson	1921-25
G.J. Fowler	1926-28
H.D.H. Drane	1929-32
J.A.H. Duke	1932-37
D.Y. Athawale	1937-47
D.R. Dhingra	1947-57
H. Trivedi	1957-62
C.R. Mitra	1962-65

=== Governance ===
HBTU is a state-university nominally headed by the Governor of Uttar Pradesh as its ex-officio Chancellor. The Chancellor appoints the Vice-Chancellor (VC), nominates certain members of the Executive Council, and is the appellate authority. HBTU is administered by the following structure:

- Chancellor
  - Executive Council (VC as Chairperson)
    - Vice-Chancellor (VC)
      - Pro Vice Chancellor (Pro VC)
      - Registrar
      - Finance Controller
      - Controller of Examinations
      - Statutory Authorities

The above-mentioned statutory authorities have their own respective chairperson, secretary, and members. They can be convened for specific functions as per their mandate. The authorities are: Academic Council, Board of Studies, Board of Examinations, and several other Committees (Finance, R&D, Admission, Grievance, etc).

=== Organisation ===
The university is operationally headed by the Vice Chancellor (VC) who is assisted by several officials in the following reporting order:

- Vice-Chancellor (VC)
  - Pro-Vice-Chancellor (Pro-VC)
    - Registrar, and Deputy Registrar
    - Finance Controller, and Fin/Acc Officer
    - Deans of six function groups
      - Associate Deans (respective)
    - Deans of six schools
      - Heads of nineteen departments
    - HR Development (HRD) Coordinator

The six functional Deans are of following work: Academic Affairs, Student's Welfare, Planning & Resource Generation (PRG), R&D, Incubation Hub, and CE-n-IQA.

== Academics ==
HBTU is a government-aided state-university for technical UG and PG education specialising in engineering and technology, along with research and consulting in allied areas. It is a non-collegiate unitary-type university, and does not affiliate or administer other colleges or institutes. It is recognised by the University Grants Commission, and is approved by the AICTE for STEM programmes. HBTU holds the NAAC A+ Grade, and the courses are accredited by the NBA. It received funding from the World Bank's IDA in TEQIP Phase-I (2004–2009), and later more under RUSA, TEQIP-II, and TEQIP-III.

"In England the epoch-making report of Sir J. J. Thomson's committee has pealed the bells of a new era. On every side one hears the cry for more and more applied science. The day of the specialist has dawned at last. Chemistry ...is the foundation of all modern civilized activities. India's great need to-day is the application of chemistry to agriculture and industry."

— Sir Harcourt Butler

=== Research ===
The college takes up R&D schemes sponsored by various entities, like DST, SERB, ICAR, DRDO, CPCB, BARC, CIDA (via SICI), CSIR, DAE, ICMR, MoFPI, DBT, etc. There are research MoUs with BIS, KGMU, LSSC (url), ACME Group (url), etc. HBTU is also an S&T partner in the Rural Technology Action Group (RuTAG) initiative of IITK.

HBTU has two Centres of Excellence - in Lipids and Paint. In 2025, the IIT Alumni Council selected HBTU as an academic partner for the Novel Materials Research Centre (NMRC) near Noida International Airport in the NCR. In 2009, Current Science ranked it #17 in top 30 Indian engg-tech institutes for their research performance, and #25 in 67 institutes based on number of papers published, using the Scopus database for the period 1999-2008.

=== Programmes ===
HBTU offers bachelor's, master's, and doctoral programmes in engineering, and technology; as well as master's and doctoral programmes in mathematics, natural sciences, and business administration. It confers the degrees of B.Tech., M.Tech., MCA, MBA, M.Sc., and Ph.D. on successful completion of these courses.

Engg-Tech Depts. of HBTU
Department	Estd.
Oil Technology	1921
Chemical Engineering	1954
Food Technology	1964
Plastic Technology	1964
Mechanical Engineering	1964
Biochemical Engineering	1964
Electrical Engineering	1965
Civil Engineering	1966
Leather Technology	1978
Computer Sci. & Engg.	1984
Electronics Engineering	1990
Paint Technology	1991

B.Tech. courses are offered in 13 fields of engineering & technology by their respective departments (plus IT by CSE dept.). Admissions to the full-time four-year B.Tech. programmes are through the NTA JEE Main exam since 2017 (previously, SEE-UPTU from 2001 to 2016, and CEE from 1979 to 2000), and to the three-year B.Tech. (Lateral Entry) are done via the CUET-UG exam.

Full-time two-year M.Tech., MBA, MCA, and M.Sc. programmes are offered at the masters level. M.Tech. is offered in 11 of the aforementioned 13 branches (except IT, and Leather Technology), while M.Sc. is offered in Physics, Chemistry, and Mathematics. A four-year BS-MS course is also offered in Mathematics & Data Science. Admissions are done to the M.Tech. programmes via the GATE & CUET-PG scores, the M.Sc. programmes via the JAM & CUET-PG exams, the MCA programme through the NIMCET exam, and the MBA programme through multiple exams (CAT, CMAT, AIMA-MAT, etc.). Admissions to the doctoral programmes (Ph.D.) are via the UGC–NET test.

=== Reputation and rankings ===
HBTU was a nationally reputed engineering college in India in the 20th century. Initially, it was affected by the industrial decline of Kanpur post 1980, a city once called Manchester of the East. By 2000s, HBTI suffered infrastructure deterioration, and faculty insufficiency. Moreover, HBTU struggled for prestige after the central institutes (IITs, IIITs, and NITs) were expanded in number by the Indian government. Some old ranking reports are given below:

- Ranked #25 by Outlook India (2006) and India Today (2007) in their India's best engineering colleges lists.
- Ranked #21 and #23 by Outlook India in their Top Govt. Engg. Colleges list in 2007 and 2008 respectively.
- Ranked #21, #21, #32, and #48 by Dataquest's DQ-CMR T-Schools Survey 2005, 2006, 2011, and 2012 respectively.
- Ranked #26, and #31 in Mint's Top 50 Government Engineering Colleges of 2008, and 2009 respectively.
- Ranked #26, #24, and #25 in Outlook India's Survey of Top Engineering Colleges of 2011, 2012, and 2013 respectively.
- Ranked #39 nationally by Career360 in 2012 in their engineering colleges list.
- Ranked #25 in Best Engineering College of India in the EDU-Rand survey in 2015.

== Entrepreneurship ==
HBTU's Technology Business Incubation Foundation (TBIF) was incorporated in 2022, and runs the Atal Incubation Hub on campus to support new ventures and entrepreneurs. It replaced the erstwhile Gen-X Innovation Incubation and Entrepreneurship Cell (GIIEC) of college. It has signed up with TiE and SIIC (IITK) for nurturing start-ups. In 2022, it collaborated with Start-in-UP initiative of Govt of UP, with support from Wadhwani Foundation, iCreate (url), Xscale (url), and others, to organise Aarambh-22 entrepreneurship conclave.

== Centenary ==
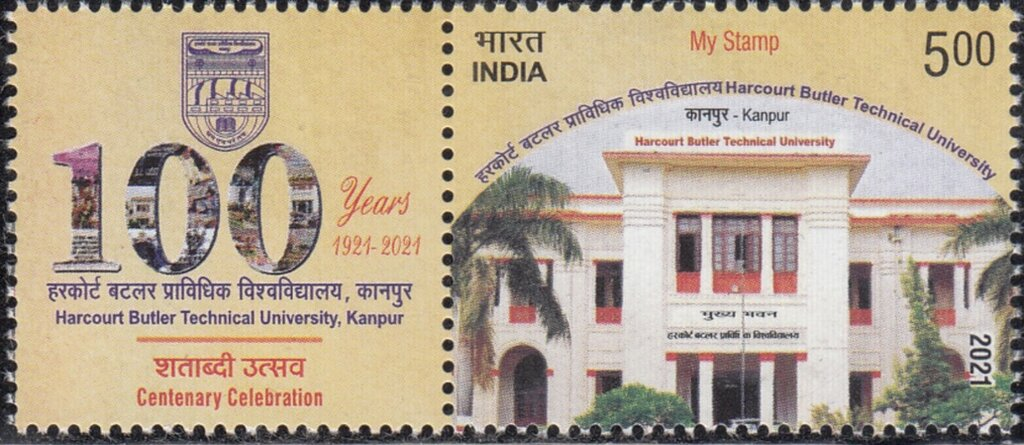
HBTU Centenary Stamp

HBTU successfully completed a century of its establishment as a teaching institution in the year 2021. It also celebrated the 100th anniversary of its Foundation-Stone Laying Ceremony on 25 November 2021. The centennial occasion was officially recognised and commemorated in the Centenary Year Function organised on the very date of anniversary under the Vice-Chancellor Dr. Samsher. The function was attended by the then President of India, Ram Nath Kovind, and the Governor of Uttar Pradesh, Anandiben Patel.

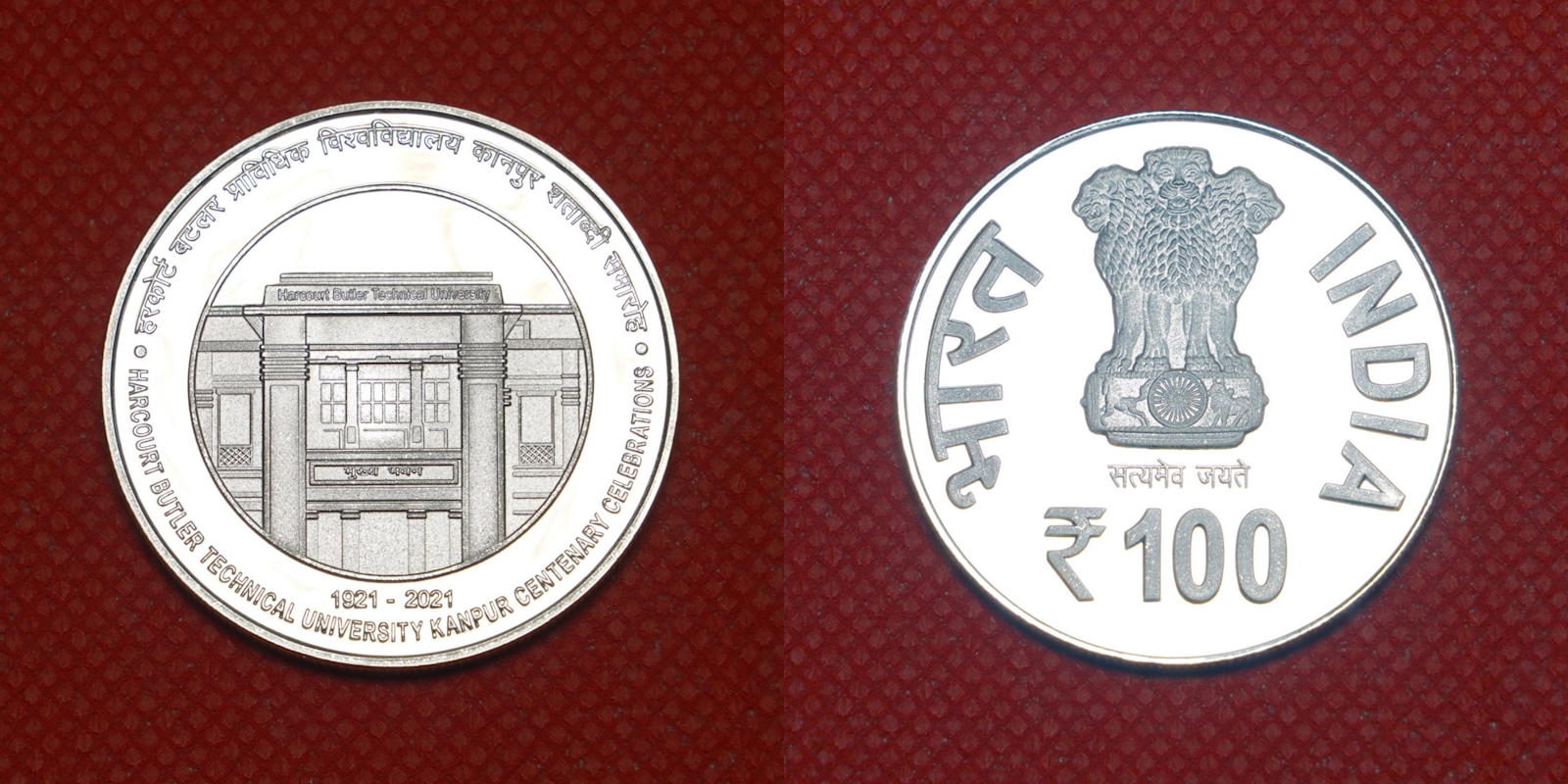
HBTU Centenary Coin

The following commemorative actions were performed as part of the centenary celebrations:

- A dual-cell 400 Kg time capsule filled with historically significant artifacts buried 10m deep below the specially constructed 60-ft high Shatabdi Stambh (Centenary Tower) in front of the Main Building.
- Launch of the book titled The History Book: HBTU, a collaborative effort of university administration, students, and alumni.
- Issue of the HBTU Centenary commemorative stamp of INR 5 face value by the India Post under the My Stamp branded personalised series made available in sheets. It is a multicolour stamp featuring the image of the Main Building, and comes attached with an informative label mentioning the centennial occasion.
- Release of the HBTU Centenary commemorative coin of INR 100 denomination. It is produced by SPMCIL at the India Government Mint, Kolkata. It is made of the quaternary metallic alloy of Silver, Copper, Nickel, and Zinc in the proportion 10:8:1:1. The reverse face of the coin (tails or back-side) bears the name of the event (in Hindi and English), the image of HBTU's Main Building along with the years of commemoration (1921-2021). It is available for order in two variants: the Uncirculated Coin (UNC), and the Proof Coin.

== Career Assistance ==
The Dean (PRG) is in-charge of the Training and Placement (T&P) Cell which is responsible for assisting students in acquiring industrial training and availing job opportunities. It consists of admin-staff and student-members from all branches. It aids in the making and verification of CVs. It also coordinates with interested organisations, and facilitates the campus placement process.

== Student life ==
=== Activity council ===
For extra-curricular activities, there are several officially recognised Sub-Councils (informally called Clubs). They are governed by an apex body called the University Students Activity Council (USAC) which is headed by a Chairman. All sub-councils have an administrative Convener, and are primarily run by their respective student-members.

The student-bodies can be categories based on their primary function:

- a college-unit of National Service Scheme (NSS)
- a college-unit of National Cadet Corps (NCC)
- clubs assisting ancillary work (Technical, Cultural, Community of Emerging Technologies (ComET), Print-n-Social Media)
- clubs for pursuing personal interests (Sports, Literary, Hobby, Photography, Yoga)
- a Personality Development Program (PDP) to organize corresponding activities

=== Associations ===
The various departments of engineering and technology also have their own Associations of engineers and technologists, e.g., ACE, AOFT, AME, etc. These associations coordinate among their faculty, students, and alumni for various co-curricular and extra-curricular activities as they deem important, including but not limited to intra-department or inter-college events. The associations have their own intra-departmental conveners, and student-members.

=== Events ===
The college organizes several annual events open to all students. Adhyaay is the annual cultural open festival, previously called Odyssey, while Taal is the intra-college cultural competition. The annual technical event is Technika (earlier, Zest), and Aagaz is the inter-college sports meet.

Separate events have been organised by different departments and clubs in the past decades. Departmental associations have organised Nirmaan (civil), Mecharnival (mechanical), Incord (computer science), Resonance (electrical), Anuvartan (electronics), Tech Era (jointly by E/E), etc. There was also a Lit Fest by cultural and literary clubs, and Udbhav by STEP-HBTI.

== Alumni ==
HBTU alumni are popularly known as Harcourtians.

The alumni have a considerable representation in the cadres of central government services (UPSC, SSC, etc.), PSUs, banks, CSIR institutes, state-government services (UPPSC, UKPSC, etc.), and provincial corporations like state-PWDs, metro-rail corps (DMRC, UPMRC, etc.), utility corps (UPPCL, UPJN, etc.), development units (DDA, UPSIDC, etc.), and many more. They are also working in the private sector firms, including all prominent MNCs.

Many alumni also go to IITs, IIMs, IISc, or foreign colleges for further education. Alumni of batches till 1990 often worked and settled abroad. There is also a HBTU Alumni Association North America (HANA), a non-profit registered in New Jersey.

=== OBA ===
Old Boys' Association was the first alumni association of HBTI, founded in the early 1930s, and referred to as "OBA, HBTI". In 1936, the sugar section was separated as an institute named IIST, but the association kept representing both. After IIST was renamed NSI in 1957, the joint alumni association was renamed "OBA, HBTI & NSI" to reflect the change. When NSI moved to its own campus in 1963, the association still carried on its activities across both campuses. The industrialist Gujarmal Modi used to be one of the patrons of OBA. However, the joint association was ultimately broken in 1971, and was again called "HBTI OBA". The association's activities declined after late 1970s.

=== Alumni association ===
The currently active Alumni Association, HBTU (originally as AA HBTI) was founded after the OBA went defunct. It was informally referred to as the Harcourtian's Association, and was officially registered in 1996. The association has chapters in major Indian cities. It organised the first International Alumni Meet in 2005, and does so every year.

=== Alumni Cell ===
HBTU's Alumni Cell is headed by the Dean (PRG) as ex-officio Chairman. The Associate Dean (PRG) is the ex-officio Member-Secretary in-charge of the alumni affairs, and there are three other rotating members - two from faculty, and one from students.

=== Notable alumni ===
- K.D. Malviya, known as "Father of the Indian Hydrocarbon Industry", UP Minister of Industries, GoI Minister of: Natural Resources (1954-57), Mines & Oil (1957-62), Mines & Fuel (1962-64), Steel (1974), Petroleum & Chemicals (1974-75), and Petroleum (1975-77)
- Dr. Devendra Kumar, Founder of Centre of Science for Villages, initiator of pan-India artisan movement Karigar Panchayat, Vice-Chancellor (1986-89) of Gandhigram Rural Institute, and 1998 Jamnalal Bajaj Award recipient
- Anil Khandelwal, Ex-Chairman-&-MD of Bank of Baroda, and recipient of the 2007 William “Bill” Seidman Award for Lifetime Achievement in Leadership in the Financial Services Industry from The Asian Banker
- Ajay Agarwal, Managing Director of Servosys Solutions, an Indian enterprise software company focused on low-code BPM, enterprise document management, and workflow automation solutions for the BFSI sector. A post-graduate in Computer Applications from Harcourt Butler Technical University,
- Alakh Pandey, Founder of Physics Wallah (India's first Edtech Unicorn)
- Dinesh Agarwal, Founder & CEO of IndiaMART (India's largest B2B marketplace)
- Dr. Kamal Kishore Pant, Director of IIT Roorkee, Petrotech Chair (FIPI) Professor at IIT Delhi, Fellow of RSC, Fellow of NASI, Fellow of INAE, Winner of Herdillia Award by IIChE, Winner (twice) of Gandhian Young Technological Innovation (GYTI) Award, and Winner of Holkar's Dr. S.S. Deshpande Award (2013)
- Robin Saraswat , a distinguished researcher in IIT Madras in the field of Reinforcement Learning and Optimizations.
- Anu Garg, Founder of A.Word.A.Day (AWAD) site Wordsmith.org (labelled "...the most welcomed, most enduring piece of daily mass e-mail in cyberspace [sic]" by The New York Times), Author of two books, and Columnist for - Microsoft Encarta, Mental Floss, and Weekly Reader

== See also ==
- National Sugar Institute (formerly IIST)
- IISc Bangalore, IIT Kanpur and NIT Allahabad
- UP Technical University (AKTU, formerly GBTU)
- UP Textile Technology Institute (formerly GCTI)
- Education in India and Higher education in India
