= N. A. Ramaiah =

Indian physical chemist

- Born: 26 August 1923 (age 103); Andhra Pradesh, India
- Education: Banaras Hindu University
- Known for: Physicochemical studies on sugar processing
- Awards: 1966 Shanti Swarup Bhatnagar Prize; STAI Noel Deer Gold Medal; 2005 STAI Lifetime Achievement Award
- Scientific career
- Fields: Physical chemistry; Sugar technology
- Workplaces: Banaras Hindu University; National Sugar Institute; Vasantdada Sugar Institute

Nanduri Atchuta Ramaiah (born 26 August 1923) is an Indian physical chemist, sugar technologist and the director of National Sugar Institute, Kanpur. He was the founder director of Vasantdada Sugar Institute, Pune and was known for his studies on physicochemical processes involved in the processing of sugarcane juice which assisted in developing cost effective manufacturing techniques. He was an elected fellow of the Indian National Science Academy, the National Academy of Agricultural Sciences and the Royal Institute of Chemistry. The Council of Scientific and Industrial Research, the apex agency of the Government of India for scientific research, awarded him the Shanti Swarup Bhatnagar Prize for Science and Technology, one of the highest Indian science awards, in 1966, for his contributions to chemical sciences.

== Biography ==
N. A. Ramaiah, born on 26 August 1923 in the south Indian state of Andhra Pradesh, passed his master's degree from Banaras Hindu University and continued there to secure a PhD; his thesis for the doctoral degree was on the origin of triggering electrons for electric discharge in electrode-less ozone tubes. His career started at his alma mater where he joined as a member of faculty but, later, shifted to the University of Delhi. In 1956, joining Government of India service, he began an association with the National Sugar Institute, Kanpur (NSI) which would last almost a quarter of a century. Starting as a professor of physical chemistry, he became the director of the institution in 1974 and stayed there till his superannuation in 1981. When the Sugar Industry Enquiry Commission was constituted by the Union Government in 1969, he was made the secretary of the commission and he stayed at the assignment, on deputation from NSI, till 1974. Vasantdada Patil and his comrades, Shankarrao Mohite-Patil, Vishwanath Anna Kore, Ratnappa Anna Kumbhar, Yashwantrao Mohite and Shankarrao Kolhe, founded the Deccan Sugar Institute in 1975 and his association with them during the tenancy of the commission gave him an opportunity to join them as the director of the institute in 1981. (Note: Deccan Sugar Institute has since been renamed as Vasantdada Sugar Institute)

Ramaiah's researches during his doctoral studies were on electron triggering and his concept of a mechanism for originating the trigger earned him an invitation to take part in the first International Ozone Conference held in Chicago in 1956. Later, he shifted his focus to the physicochemical reactions involved in resolving the color issues during sugarcane processing. The sugar industry in India, in those days, resorted to excessive use of sulphur for clarifying sugarcane juice and the chemical being a scarce commodity in India, had to face escalating cost for the processing. Ramaiah developed several analytical methodologies for color assessment and for the production of active carbon which assisted the industry to lessen their dependence on sulphur, thereby making the processing more cost effective. The protocols developed by him have since become industry-standards.

Ramaiah has written extensively on sugar technology by way of over 325 articles, many of them published in peer-reviewed journals (Note: Please see Selected bibliography section) and his articles have been cited by others. He has mentored 23 doctoral students in their studies and has trained many sugar industry professionals. He sat on the Board of Directors of the World Sugar Research Organization (WSRO) from 1981 to 1985 and has been involved in performance-improvement measures taken by WSRO in various countries. While serving as the chair of the ICAR Committee, he prepared a project report for the manufacture of ethanol from sugarcane in which he proposed the use of ethanol as motor fuel. He served as the president of Walkers Club, Visakhapatanam, the city chapter of Walkers International and is a life member of Indian Chemical Society and the Sugar Technologists' Association of India.

== Awards and honors ==
The Council of Scientific and Industrial Research awarded Ramaiah the Shanti Swarup Bhatnagar Prize, one of the highest Indian science awards, in 1966. The Sugar Technologists Association of India (STAI) honored him with the Noel Deer Gold Medal and followed it up with the Lifetime Achievement Award in 2005. He is an elected fellow of the Indian National Science Academy, National Academy of Agricultural Sciences and the Royal Institute of Chemistry. A street, Atchuta Ramaiah street, in Kakinada in East Godavari district in Andhra Pradesh has been named after him.

== Selected bibliography ==
- O P Dogra; M G Bhatawdekar; N A Ramaiah (1953). "A Note on Secondary Processes in a Low-Frequency Electrodeless Discharge". Proceedings of the Physical Society. 66 (5): 431. Bibcode:1953PPSB...66..431D. doi:10.1088/0370-1301/66/5/115.
- N. A. Ramaiah; S. K. D. Agarwal (July 1956). "Comparative studies of alternating and direct current polarography: Effect of concentration". Proceedings of the Indian Academy of Sciences. 44: 25–35. doi:10.1007/BF03051862. S2CID 92195392.
- N. A. Ramaiah; S. K. D. Agarwal (August 1956). "Comparative studies of alternating and direct current polarography: Effect of pH". Proceedings of the Indian Academy of Sciences. 44 (2): 83–89. doi:10.1007/BF03048805. S2CID 92764307.
- N. A. Ramaiah; S. S. Katiyar (1965). "Studies on irreversible polarographic reduction of Brilliant Green". Bull. Natl. -Inst. Sci. (India). 29 (267).
- N. A. Ramaiah; M. B. Kuma (1968). "KInetic Studies on Caramelization of Reducing Sugars" (PDF). National Sugar Institute. S2CID 29800379.
- N. A. Ramaiah; G. N. Acharya; P. Kapur (2016). "Determination of Factors relating to Automation for Boiling of Low Grade Massecuites in Plantation White Sugar Industry (full text)". Deccan Sugar Institute.

== See also ==
- Vasantdada Patil
- Shankarrao Mohite-Patil
- Ratnappa Kumbhar
- Yashwantrao Mohite
