= Lohia path =

Road in Lucknow, India

Coordinates: 26°51′30.20″N 80°59′5.42″E

Lohia path is an 8–12 lane road in Lucknow, in the Indian state of Uttar Pradesh, connecting the Hazratganj shopping district with Government Polytechnic, the Gomti Nagar neighborhood and ending at Kalidas Marg, the residence of Uttar Pradesh's chief minister. It displays beautiful railings and lamp posts on both sides. In addition to vehicular lanes, it includes a bicycle track and footpath. It was built under the government of Mulayam Singh Yadav in 2005 and was inaugurated in 2007.

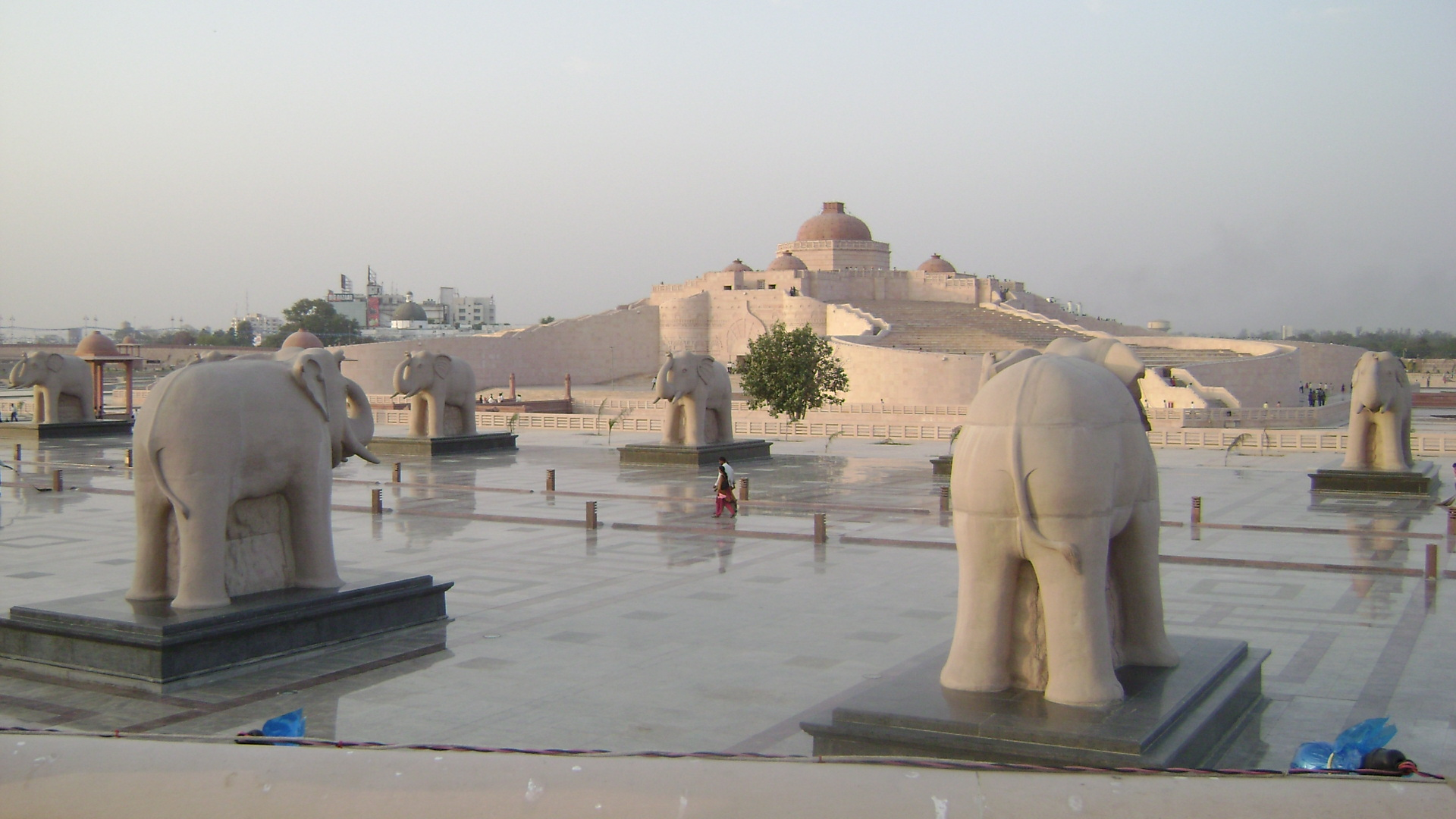
Ambedkar Stupa

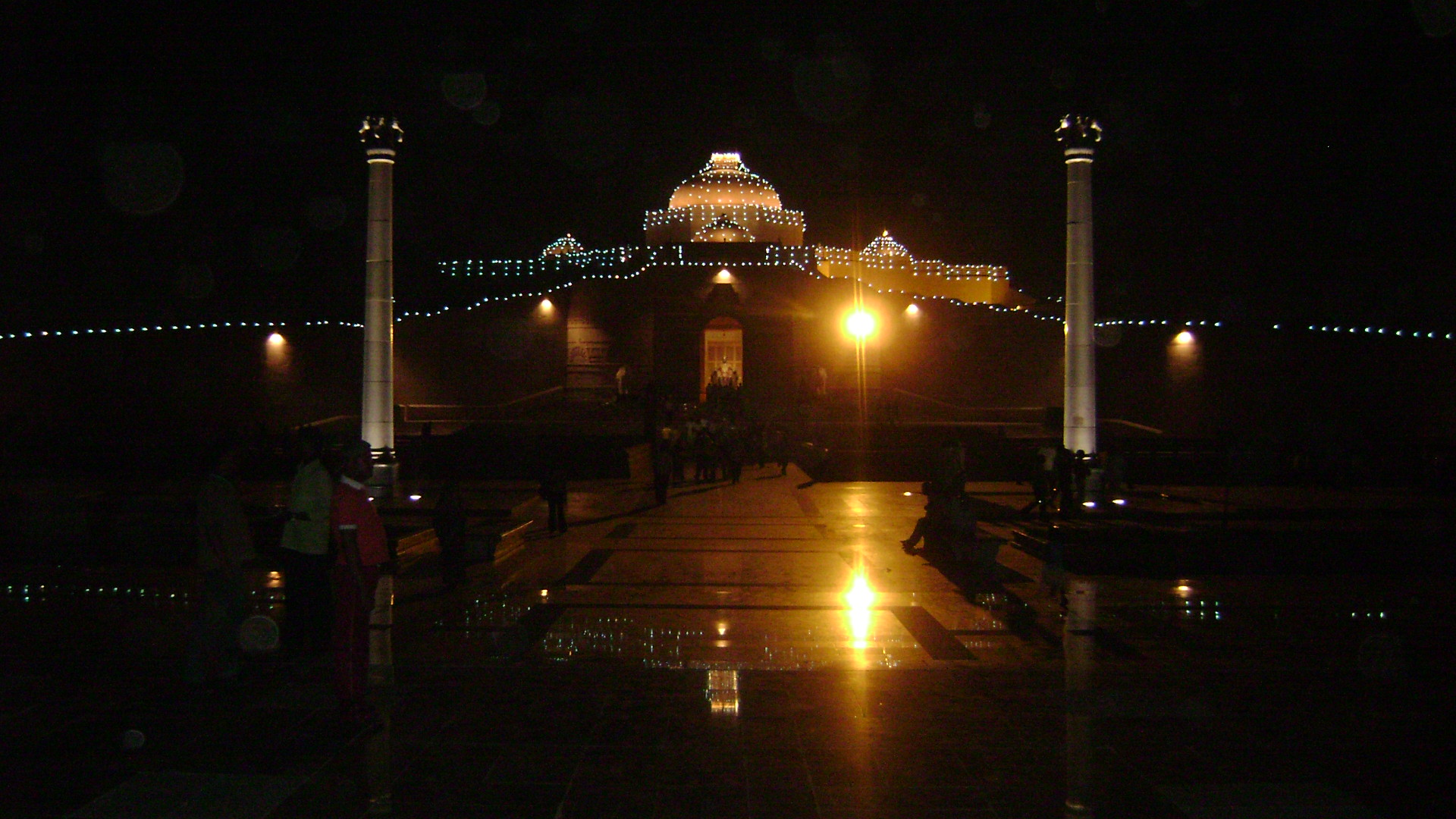
Ambedkar Stupa Night view

== Features ==
Lohia Path, which caters to a heavy traffic coming from Bareilly-Bara Banki-Sitapur on one side and Kanpur-Raebareli-Allahabad, Sultanpur-Varanasi from the other side, thus gains importance with this project. Many important offices, institutions and hotels, besides the new Gomtinagar townships are situated on this road. The Lohia Park, a project of chief minister Mulayam Singh Yadav, is also located on this road. All this has increased the traffic flow on this road manifold. The salient features of the upcoming project are: The width of the road will be increased from the existing seven metres to 11.5 metres on either side. Thus the total available carriage way for the fast moving vehicles will be 23 metres. Secondly, for the safety and smooth flow of traffic the lanes for motorised vehicles is being segregated from bicyclists and pedestrians by providing 1.5 metre wide footpath and two-metre wide bicycle track on both sides of the road.

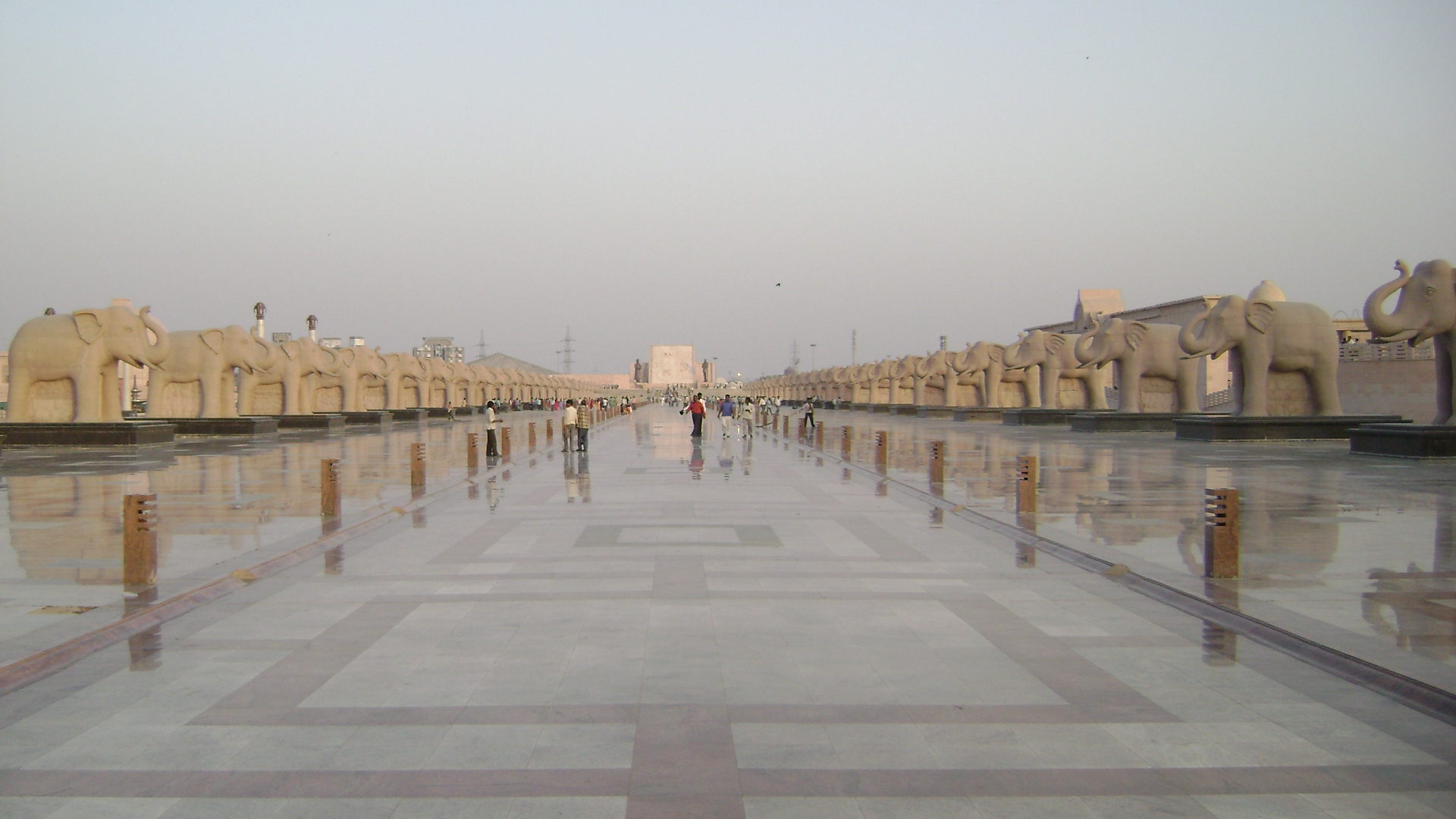
Pratibimb Sthal

== Use ==
Dr. Ram Manohar Lohia Park, Lohia Hospital, prominent hotels and busy cafés are near this road. Lohia Path caters to heavy traffic between Bareilly-Bara Banki-Sitapur and Kanpur-Allahabad, Sultanpur-Varanasi. A bridge over the railway lines passing through the path opened on Saturday, 17 October 2009. The bridge, spanning 1,500 meters, helps to remove traffic bottlenecks. The road passes through Lucknow's costliest and most posh areas. Malls, corporate offices, government offices and parks are located on this roads and near by.

- Wave Mall
- East End Mall
- Inox Mall
- Fun Mall
- Ambedkar park
- Tcs office
- Lohia Hospital
- Lohia Park
- Gomti Nagar station

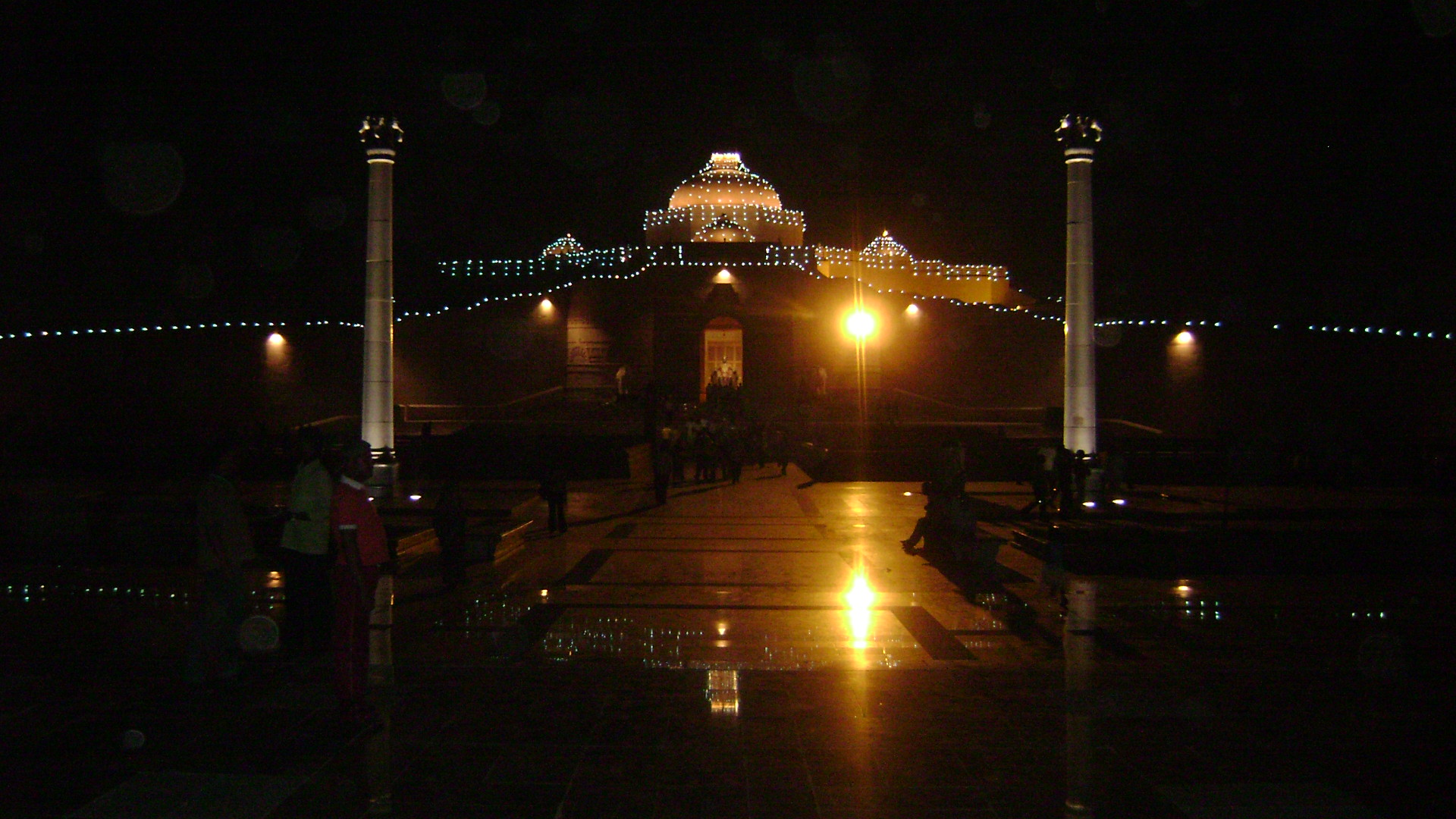
Ambedkar Stupa Night view
