= IDfy =

Indian identity verification company

- Type: Private
- Industry: Identity verification, Anti–money laundering, Risk and fraud, Personal data protection
- Founded: 2011
- Founders: Ashok Hariharan; Vineet Jawa
- Headquarters: Mumbai, India
- Area served: India, Indonesia, the Philippines, and the Middle East.
- Key people: Paritosh Desai, chief product officer; Wriju Ray, chief business officer; Ashish Sahni, chief technology officer; ; Malcolm Gomes, Chief operating officer; Kaushik Shah, Chief strategy officer
- Owner: Baldor Technologies
- Website: www.idfy.com

IDfy is an Indian identity verification company headquartered in Mumbai, India. It was founded in 2011 and is operated by Baldor Technologies. The company's operations are spread across Mumbai, Pune, Delhi, and Bangalore.

== History ==
IDfy was founded in 2011 in Mumbai by Ashok Hariharan and Vineet Jawa with an initial focus on background verification services. Before this venture, Ashok Hariharan worked at British Telecom, while Vineet Jawa was a co-founder of the fintech firm CredRight. In 2012, IDfy raised seed funding from Blume Ventures. By August 2015, IDfy had raised up to $3 million from existing investors, including Blume Ventures, Faktory Ventures, NEA, and Japanese e-commerce and investment firm Beenos. In June 2020, the company formed a partnership with Visa for video KYC. In 2021, the company raised $3 million and later secured $10 million in series D funding. In 2023, IDfy partnered with Jio Haptik and acquired the SaaS platform Salesroom.

In 2024, IDfy launched Privy, a governance platform that supports companies fully complying with the DPDP Act. The same year, IDfy launched a comic book titled DPDP Dilemma with Consent Chaudhary, which explores scenarios where user consent and data security are compromised due to a lack of awareness about the DPDP Act and negligence towards the content in terms and conditions agreements. On March 6, 2024, the company secured $27 million in funding through a combination of primary and secondary fundraising rounds.

As of 2025, IDfy operates in seven countries, including India, Southeast Asia, and the Middle East. The company has reported that it runs over 60 million verifications per month.

== Financial performance ==
According to Entrackr, in the fiscal year 2023–24 (FY24), IDfy reported revenues of ₹145 crore with a net loss of ₹8.8 crore, while in 2024–25 (FY25), its revenues increased to ₹188.5 crore and it recorded a net profit of ₹7.8 crore. IDfy has raised more than US$50 million in funding from investors including Elev8, TransUnion, Blume Ventures, New Enterprise Associates (NEA), and IndiaMART.

== Awards ==
In 2016, IDfy was awarded by the World HRD Congress. The company was featured in the National Skills Registry, an initiative of NASSCOM.

In 2022, IDfy's name was included in the Deloitte Technology Fast 50 India 2022 list. For two consecutive years in 2022 and 2023, the company was ranked among Asia's top five regulatory technology companies.

In 2023, IDfy was featured in Forbes Asia's '100 To Watch' list.

It also received the Fintech Scaleup of the Year’ at IFTA 2021.
