= Dinesh Agarwal =

Indian business executive

- Born: Dinesh Agarwal; 19 February 1969 (age 57)
- Education: Harcourt Butler Technological Institute
- Occupations: Founder and CEO of IndiaMART
- Spouse: Chetna Agarwal

Dinesh Agarwal (born 19 February 1969) is an Indian entrepreneur, founder and CEO of IndiaMART, India's largest online B2B marketplace.

== Early life and education ==
Dinesh studied at Maharaja Agrasen Vidyalaya Inter College, Lucknow, and completed a B.Tech engineering degree with a specialization in computer science from Harcourt Butler Technological Institute, Kanpur.

== Early career ==
Dinesh first started working at CMC (now part of TCS) where he worked on the first Railway reservation system and later joined Sam Pitroda and his team at the Center for Development of Telematics to develop an indigenous digital telephone exchange for India.

In 1992, Dinesh moved to HCL in the US, to set up offices on the East Coast. There he saw the birth of the internet in America, realized the potential of the internet and the impact it could have on Indian masses.

=== 1995 and after ===
In August 1995, he resigned from HCl, returned to India with his wife and child, and started looking for internet related opportunities to become an internet entrepreneur.

Agarwal decided to make a website that would be an online marketplace for exporters and importers. India had around 15,000 internet users at that time. When he did not receive government permission to get the directories of exporters and sellers online, he decided to have a free listing form and sent it to all the sellers in the directories. "My whole family, including my mother and wife, would help with the mailers.”IndiaMART's first tagline was: 'The global gateway to Indian marketplace'.

In 2007–2008 when recession hit the US, Agarwal and his cousin Brijesh decided to pivot the focus from export oriented business to India-focused B2B market and raised $10 million from Intel Capital.

Other domain ventures by Agarwal include www.indiangiftsportal.com and www.abcpayments.com. He later became an investor, providing funding to Tolexo, and Innerchef, a Gurgaon-based ready-to-eat and ready-to-cook meals delivery startup.

== An Angel Investor ==
Dinesh has invested in a number of start-ups, including Curofy, Wishberry, SilverPush, InnerChef, and AppVirality. Little Eye Labs was acquired by Facebook. Reported investments associated with him include InnerChef Private Limited, Complete Capital Private Ltd, Quicko Technosoft, and Arivihan Technologies Private Limited.

== Awards and recognition ==
- Entrepreneur of the Year (2023) - Dun & Bradstreet Business Excellence Awards.
- Digital Person of the Year (2020) - India Digital Awards, organised by IAMAI.
- EY Entrepreneur of the Year (2020) - Service Category, EY Entrepreneur of the Year Awards.
