= Anu Garg =

American author and speaker (born 1967)

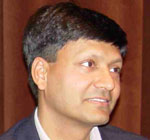
- Born: Anurag Garg; April 5, 1967 (age 59); Meerut, India
- Occupations: Writer, speaker, columnist, software engineer
- Writing career
- Genre: Non-fiction
- Website: wordsmith.org/anu/

Anu Garg (born April 5, 1967) is an American author and speaker. He is the founder of Wordsmith.org, an online community comprising aficionados of the English language from across 170 countries. His books explore the joy of words. He has authored several books about language-related issues and written for magazines and newspapers. He was a columnist for MSN Encarta and Kahani magazine.

== Life and education ==
Garg was born and grew up in Uttar Pradesh in India and only began to learn English at age 11. A graduate of Harcourt Butler Technological Institute, he holds a BTech in Computer Science.

In 1992, he moved to the U.S. on a scholarship to study at Case Western Reserve University in Cleveland and three years later had earned his master's degree in computer science. Garg became a naturalized U.S. citizen in 2008 and he lives in the Seattle area. He is a vegan.

== Career ==
Garg has worked as a computer scientist at AT&T and other corporations. In 1994, while studying at Case Western, he founded Wordsmith.org. He has authored several books as noted below.

=== Bibliography ===
- Garg, Anu; Garg, Stuti (2002). A Word A Day: A Romp Through Some of the Most Unusual and Intriguing Words in English. Wiley. ISBN 978-0471230328.
- Garg, Anu (2005). Another Word A Day : An All-new Romp through Some of the Most Unusual and Intriguing Words in English. Wiley. ISBN 978-0471718451.
- Garg, Anu (2007). The Dord, the Diglot, and an Avocado or Two: The Hidden Lives and Strange Origins of Common and Not-So-Common Words. Plume. ISBN 978-0452288614.

== See also ==
- List of Indian writers
