= Gilbert John Fowler =

British biochemist (1868–1953)

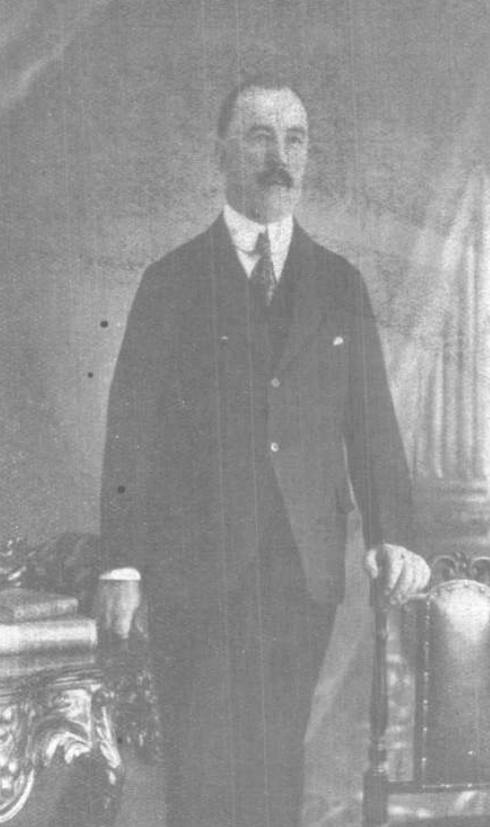
Fowler c. 1924

Gilbert John Fowler (23 January 1868 – 21 March 1953) was a British biochemist who worked on pollution, decomposition and sewage treatment in Britain and later in India where he established the first research laboratory in biochemistry at the Indian Institute of Science at Bangalore. He established the earliest ideas for the activated sludge process of sewage treatment by examining bacterial growth and noting their oxygen requirement.

== Life and career ==
Fowler was born in Paris to Robert John and Priscilla (Alleston) Fowler and was educated at Sidcot School and then Owen's College, Manchester where he later joined to work as a Demonstrator in Chemistry. His early work was in metallurgy and he received a Dalton Prize for his study on silver suboxide. Fowler then joined the chemistry department of the University of Manchester as a lecturer and then worked as a consultant to the Rivers Committee. He worked on effluent treatment and received a D.Sc. from Heidelberg University in 1904. His major advance was in noting the need of oxygen by bacteria and he found that the removal of sludge from sewage was counterproductive to decomposition. He devised a system for aeration that retained the sludge and introduced the idea of activated sludge. He was much sought out by cities across the world including New York, Shanghai, Cairo and Calcutta. He was a regular visitor to India from 1906 and became a permanent resident in 1916 after taking up position as a Professor of Applied Chemistry at the Indian Institute of Science in Bangalore. His early research was in the fermentation of mahua flowers to produce alcohol and then to produce acetone for use in the manufacture of ammunition. A factory was established at Nasik under his supervision. In 1921 he headed a newly created department of biochemistry at the Indian Institute of Science. Here he was especially interested in the conservation of nitrogen for agricultural applications and worked on processes to utilize waste from agriculture and industry. He also examined shellac production, conducting experiments, growing lac in the Doresanipalya forest in Bangalore in collaboration with Leslie Coleman, Syed Mahdihassan (1892-1992) and others. He established an activated sludge sewage treatment plant on the campus. He lived most of his life in Bangalore except for a brief stint as a Principal of the Harcourt Butler Technological Institute at Kanpur from 1927 to 1927. He and his wife lived in Central Hotel, Bangalore where he died on 21 March 1953. His wife Amy Hindmarsh née Scott and two sons survived him.

== Writings ==
Fowler wrote several books including Sewage Works Analyses (1902), An Introduction to Bacteriological and Enzyme Chemistry (1911), An introduction to the biochemistry of nitrogen conservation (1934). In 1935 he patented a process to separate solids from liquids in sludge and sewage treatment. He was an ardent Christian scientist and after his retirement took an interest in economics and energetics and wanted to reform currency. He suggested a currency called the "ERN" which was the protein equivalent having 10 grams of nitrogen or the energy derived from it, 300 calories. The value of any commodity or service would then be the energy needed to produce it in terms of ERN units.

== Honours ==
Fowler was a Fellow of the Royal Institute of Chemistry, the Chemical Society of England and the Royal Sanitary Institute. He also served as member of the Industrial Research Council of the Government of India from 1937 to 1939.
