= Uttar Pradesh Textile Technology Institute =

Textile engineering college in Kanpur, UP, India

Coordinates: 26.487158°N 80.334778°E

- Type: Government College, Autonomous
- Established: 1914; 111 years ago
- Director: G. Nalankilli
- Location: Souterganj, Kanpur-208 001, Uttar Pradesh, India
- Campus: Urban
- Affiliations: Dr. A. P. J. Abdul Kalam Technical University, Lucknow
- Website: www.uptti.ac.in

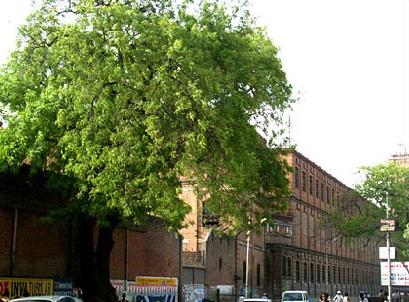
Lal Imli factory

Uttar Pradesh Textile Technology Institute (UPTTI), formerly Government Central Textile Institute (GCTI), is a state government founded textile engineering college in Kanpur, Uttar Pradesh. It is one of the oldest and premier textile Institute of North India, established in 1914. It offers professional degrees of bachelor's of technology (4years) in 4 streams Textile Technology, Textile Chemistry, Man Made Fibre Technology and Textile Engineering; and Master's in technology (2 years) in textile technology and textile chemistry to students selected through a State Entrance Exam (UPSEE) conducted by Dr.A.P.J. Abdul Kalam Technical University (AKTU) every year.

== About ==
In 1937, Government Central Textile Institute came into existence in its present form by the merger of two premier textile institutes: one at Kanpur and the other at Roorkee, i.e., Department of Textile Technology, Thomson Civil Engineering College of Roorkee. Diploma programmes were started in Textile Manufacture and Chemical Technology.

In 1958/59 four-year degree programmes in Textile Technology and Textile Chemistry were started. Initially the institute was affiliated to Agra University. On establishment of the university in Kanpur in 1966 it was affiliated to Kanpur University. In 1976/77 the institute pioneered a four-year degree programme in man-made fibre technology. In 1985 the three-year diploma programmes were shifted to Government Polytechnic Kanpur and thereafter the institute has been running graduate and postgraduate programmes with Ph.D. research facilities. The fourth degree programme in Textile Engineering was added under a World Bank-aided Technical Education Quality Improvement Programme of the government of India and the government of the state of Uttar Pradesh in 2005.

The institute is organized into four textile departments along with departments of Basic Sciences and Engineering. All textile departments offer the B.Tech. degree, and Textile Technology and Textile Chemistry departments offer the M.Tech degree. Facilities for doctorate level research exist in all departments.

1914: Year of starting (School of Dyeing and Printing) 1923: Govt. Textile school of Thomson Civil Engg. College, Roorkee, was shifted to this campus. 1937: They were merged and renamed as “Government Central Textile Institute”, offering 3 years Diploma in Textile Manufacturing and Chemical Technology. 1958: B.TechTextile Technology & Textile Chemistry (Agra University), 1966: Affiliated to Kanpur University, 2000: Affiliated to Dr. APJ Abdul Kalam Technical University, Lucknow, formerly Uttar Pradesh Technical University. 1976: B.Tech Man Made Fibre Technology 1985: Part-time M.Tech Textile Technology &Textile Chemistry 1988: Full-time M.Tech Textile Technology, part-time M.Tech Textile Chemistry discontinued. 2005: M.Tech Textile Chemistry & B.Tech Textile Engg. 2006: Became autonomous and renamed as Uttar Pradesh Textile Technology Institute (UPTTI) under society act. 2012: Academic autonomy from UGC, and implemented from 2016-17 continued till date.

== Departments and degrees ==
Programs Year of inception Sanctioned intake B.Tech Textile Technology 1958 40 B.Tech Textile Chemistry 1958 60 B.Tech Man Made Fibre Technology 1976 60 B.Tech Textile Engineering 2005 40

M.Tech Textile Technology 1988 12 M.Tech Textile Chemistry 2005 18

1914: Year of starting (School of Dyeing and Printing) 1923: Govt. Textile school of Thomson Civil Engg. College, Roorkee, was shifted to this campus. 1937: They were merged and renamed as “Government Central Textile Institute”, offering 3 years Diploma in Textile Manufacturing and Chemical Technology. 1958: B.TechTextile Technology & Textile Chemistry (Agra University), 1966: Affiliated to Kanpur University, 2000: Affiliated to Dr. APJ Abdul Kalam Technical University, Lucknow, formerly Uttar Pradesh Technical University. 1976: B.Tech Man Made Fibre Technology 1985: Part-time M.Tech Textile Technology &Textile Chemistry 1988: Full-time M.Tech Textile Technology, part-time M.Tech Textile Chemistry discontinued. 2005: M.Tech Textile Chemistry & B.Tech Textile Engg. 2006: Became autonomous and renamed as Uttar Pradesh Textile Technology Institute (UPTTI) under society act. 2012: Academic autonomy from UGC, and implemented from 2016-17 continued till date.

NBA Accreditations 3 years with effect from 12/12/2003 3 years with effect from 19/07/2008 3 years (2019–20, 2020–21, 2021–22) till 30/06/2022

== 100 years celebration ==
Eminent persons associated with the textile industry of the country attended the centenary functions of the institute on 1 and 2 November 2014.

== Hostel ==
There is a boys' and girls' hostel on the premises. Different hostels for students of different year are available at feasible fee.
