= IndiaMART =

Indian e-commerce company started from the year 1996

IndiaMART InterMESH Ltd.
- Type: Public
- Traded as: BSE: 542726; NSE: INDIAMART
- ISIN: INE933S01016
- Industry: Internet marketing; B2B marketplace
- Founded: 1 April 1996; 30 years ago
- Founders: Dinesh Agarwal; Brijesh Agrawal
- Headquarters: Noida, Uttar Pradesh, India
- Area served: India
- Revenue: ▲₹1,196 crore (US$120 million) (FY24)
- Net income: ▲₹334 crore (US$35 million) (FY24)
- Number of employees: 5,384
- Subsidiaries: Tolexo; Tradezeal International; Busy Infotech
- Website: indiamart.com

IndiaMART InterMESH Ltd is an Indian B2B online marketplace company, headquartered in Noida. The company started its operations in 1996 when Dinesh Agarwal and Brijesh Agrawal founded the website IndiaMART.com, a business-to-business portal to connect Indian manufacturers with buyers.

== History ==
Founded in 1996 by two cousins Dinesh Agarwal and Brijesh Agrawal, IndiaMART began as a B2B directory and website developer for SMEs. At that time, India had only 15,000 internet users.

Due to Indian rupee's appreciation between 2005 and 2007 and the impact of the 2008–09 US recession, the company decided to pivot the focus from export-oriented business to India-focused B2B market and raised funding from The Times Group and Intel Capital.

In March 2016, it raised Series C funding from Amadeus Capital Partners and Quona Capital to scale up the activities of IndiaMART and Tolexo. In 2016, IndiaMART invested in ProcMart.

In June 2018, IndiaMART filled draft papers with SEBI to raise ₹600 crore through IPO and list on NSE and BSE. In July 2019, IndiaMART went public via an IPO of ₹474 crore. IndiaMART became the first online B2B marketplace to go public in India.

As of 2019, IndiaMART was the largest Indian B2B marketplace for businesses with about 60% market share, according to KPMG.

== Subsidiaries ==
In January 2022, IndiaMART acquired 100% stake in accounting software company Busy Infotech for ₹500 crore, the acquisition was completed in April 2022, making BUSY a wholly owned subsidiary. Busy is an Indian accounting software company focused on SMEs, offering comprehensive accounting, inventory management, and Indian indirect-tax compliance solutions, including complete GST functionalities such as e-invoicing and e-way bill generation.

== Investments ==
In 2019, IndiaMART led the Series A funding round in Vyapar. In 2022, IndiaMART invested an additional ₹61.55 crore in Vyapar as part of its Series B funding.

In 2024, it acquired a 10% stake in IDfy.

== Products ==
IndiaMART handles 119 million products across 56 industry groups. It hosts 98,000 product categories - ranging from construction and building raw materials, industry plants, machinery and packaging material to electrical equipment, apparel to furniture, housewares, and cosmetics, among others. Godrej, Blue Star, Tata Motors, Automat, Essae, Hilti, TMTL are some of the biggest suppliers with IndiaMART. It hosts more than 8 million sellers and 211 million buyers on its platform.

== Regulatory and compliance ==
In November 2020, IndiaMART filed a copyright infringement lawsuit against Justdial before the Delhi High Court on allegations of copying website compilations for the proposed JD Mart B2B marketplace.

Since 2018, the USTR has listed IndiaMART as a "notorious market" due to reports of counterfeit products and illegal pharmaceuticals being sold on the marketplace.
