= National Sugar Institute =

Indian governmental agency

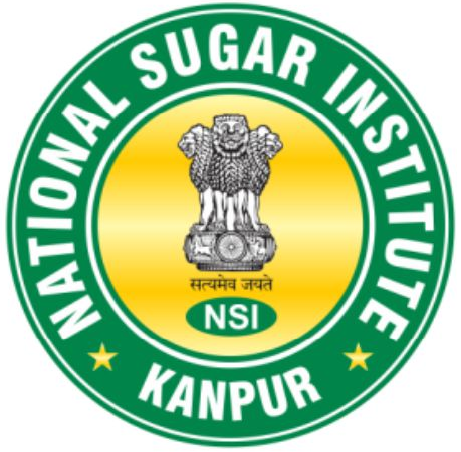
- Former names: Imperial Institute of Sugar Technology (1938-1947), Indian Institute of Sugar Technology (1947-1957)
- Motto: Tamaso ma jyotirgamaya
- Motto in English: Lead me from darkness to light
- Type: Government
- Established: 1936; 90 years ago
- Director: Seema Paroha
- Location: G.T. Road, Near Kalyanpur Railway Station, Kalyanpurr, 208017, Kanpur
- Campus: Urban 525 acres (2.12 km^{2})
- Website: nsi.gov.in

The National Sugar Institute (NSI) established in 1936, is involved in research, training and advisory services to the sugar and allied industry, and functions under the Department of Food and Public Distribution of the Ministry of Consumer Affairs, Food and Public Distribution. Located in Kalyanpur, Kanpur, Uttar Pradesh, India, it provides technical education and training in research in all branches of sugar chemistry, sugar technology, sugar engineering and allied fields. The institute provide assistance to central and state governments in matters relating to sugar and allied industries.

== History ==
National Sugar Institute has a very old history laying its roots way back in 1920. The climatic Condition and the area under cultivation encouraged the British Indian Government to promote the Sugar Industry in India which further resulted in the formation of Indian Sugar Committee. The said committee recommended for an All India Institute for research in the field of Sugarcane and Sugar production in 1920 which was further commended by the Royal Commission in 1928 & tariff board in 1930. On the basis of the above recommendations, the Government of India took over the Sugar Section of the HARCOURT BUTLER TECHNICAL INSTITUTE, Kanpur and established the IMPERIAL INSTITUTE OF SUGAR TECHNOLOGY, Kanpur in October 1936. The Imperial Institute of Sugar Technology was placed under the administrative control of the Imperial Council of Agricultural Research located in the campus of HBTI, Kanpur. Upon the formation of Indian Central Sugarcane Committee in 1944 the administrative control of the Imperial Institute of Sugar Technology was transferred to the said Committee. Consequent upon India's attaining independence in 1947, the name of the institute was changed from Imperial Institute of Sugar Technology to Indian Institute of Sugar Technology (I.I.S.T.). With the formation of the Development Council for Sugar Industry under the provisions of the Industries (Development and Regulation ) Act, 1951, the functions of the Indian Central Sugarcane Committee were abridged with effect from 1 January 1954 and the administrative control of the institute was transferred to the Government of India, under Ministry of Food & Agriculture. In April 1957, the name of the institute was again changed to National Sugar Institute (N.S.I.). The Institute shifted from the campus of HBTI, Kanpur to its own campus at Kalyanpur, Kanpur in 1963 and as of now it is only sugar institute in Asia.

== Courses ==
The institute offers postgraduate diploma courses in sugar technology (ANSI (ST) Associateship of the National Sugar Institute in Sugar Technology), sugar engineering (ANSI (SE) Associateship of the National Sugar Institute in Sugar Engineering) and in industrial fermentation and alcohol technology (DIFAT, diploma in industrial fermentation and alcohol technology). In addition post diploma course in sugar engineering (SECC, sugar engineering certificate course) is offered.

Sugar boiling (SBCC, sugar boiling certificate course) and pre-harvest cane maturity survey (PHCMSC- Pre-harvest cane maturity survey course) are available.

Refresher courses are conducted for the benefit of in service industry personnel.

== Library ==
The institute has a very well equipped and fully air conditioned library. It is the largest and most comprehensive collection of sugar literature in India and the world.
