= Government Polytechnic Lucknow =

Indian tertiary technical school

Coordinates: 26.8743°N 80.9976°E

Government Polytechnic Lucknow (राजकीय पालीटेक्निक लखनऊ) (GP Lucknow, or GPL) is an Indian Polytechnic institution of tertiary technical education for vocational courses. It was established in 1892, originally as an industrial training school, and was later upgraded to technical level in the 20th century. It is affiliated to Uttar Pradesh Board of Technical Education (BTEUP) and All India Council for Technical Education (AICTE), New Delhi.

== History ==
In 1891, a committee set-up by Sir Auckland Colvin, KCSI, KCMG, CIE, the then Lieutenant-Governor of North-Western Provinces and Chief Commissioner of Oudh, recommended that an industrial school be established either at Lucknow or Allahabad. It was sanctioned in July 1892, and ultimately opened as Government Industrial School by Sir Colvin on 1 November 1892. It was originally intended to train the children of artisans and railway employees. However, by 1896, it was training students who wished to apply for Thomason College of Civil Engineering in Roorkee. It was initially located at Bans Mandi Chauraha (crossing) near Lucknow Charbagh railway station.

In August 1907, the then Lieutenant-Governor of United Provinces of Agra and Oudh, Sir John P. Hewett, GCSI, KBE, CIE, convened the Industrial Conference at Naini Tal for development of industrial education. It recommended, among other things, the upgrade of the school to technical level. Thus, in 1911 it became Government Technical School (GTS). It expanded during 1913-15 when courses were added to the curriculum, including mechanical apprentice classes moved to GTS from Thomason College. By 31 March 1916, the total students enrolled had crossed past the three-figure mark to 111. Post Indian independence, its name was changed to Government Polytechnic Lucknow in 1961, and it shifted to its present location at Polytechnic Chauraha, about 12 km from Lucknow Junction.

== Academics ==
The polytechnic offers post-HSC non-degree courses. They include the three-year architectural assistantship, three-year non-graduate diploma programs in multiple fields of engineering, and one-year PG diploma courses.
