= List of educational institutions in Lucknow =

Lucknow is the capital and largest city of Uttar Pradesh, serving as the state's principal administrative, educational and cultural centre. Located on the banks of the Gomti River, it is known for its historical monuments, Nawabi-era heritage, traditional arts and cuisine. The city has a large network of schools, degree colleges, universities and research institutions, making it an important centre for higher education and research in northern India.

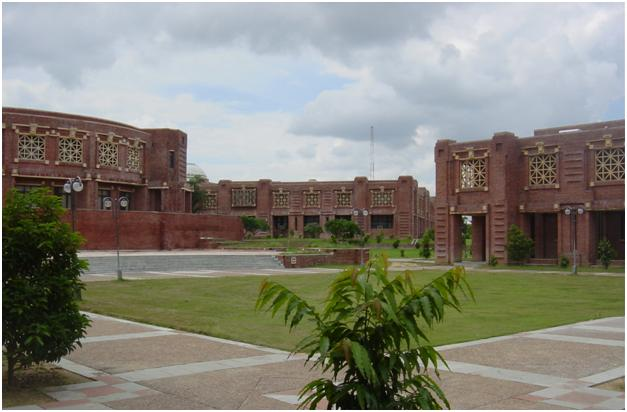
Indian Institute of Management Lucknow

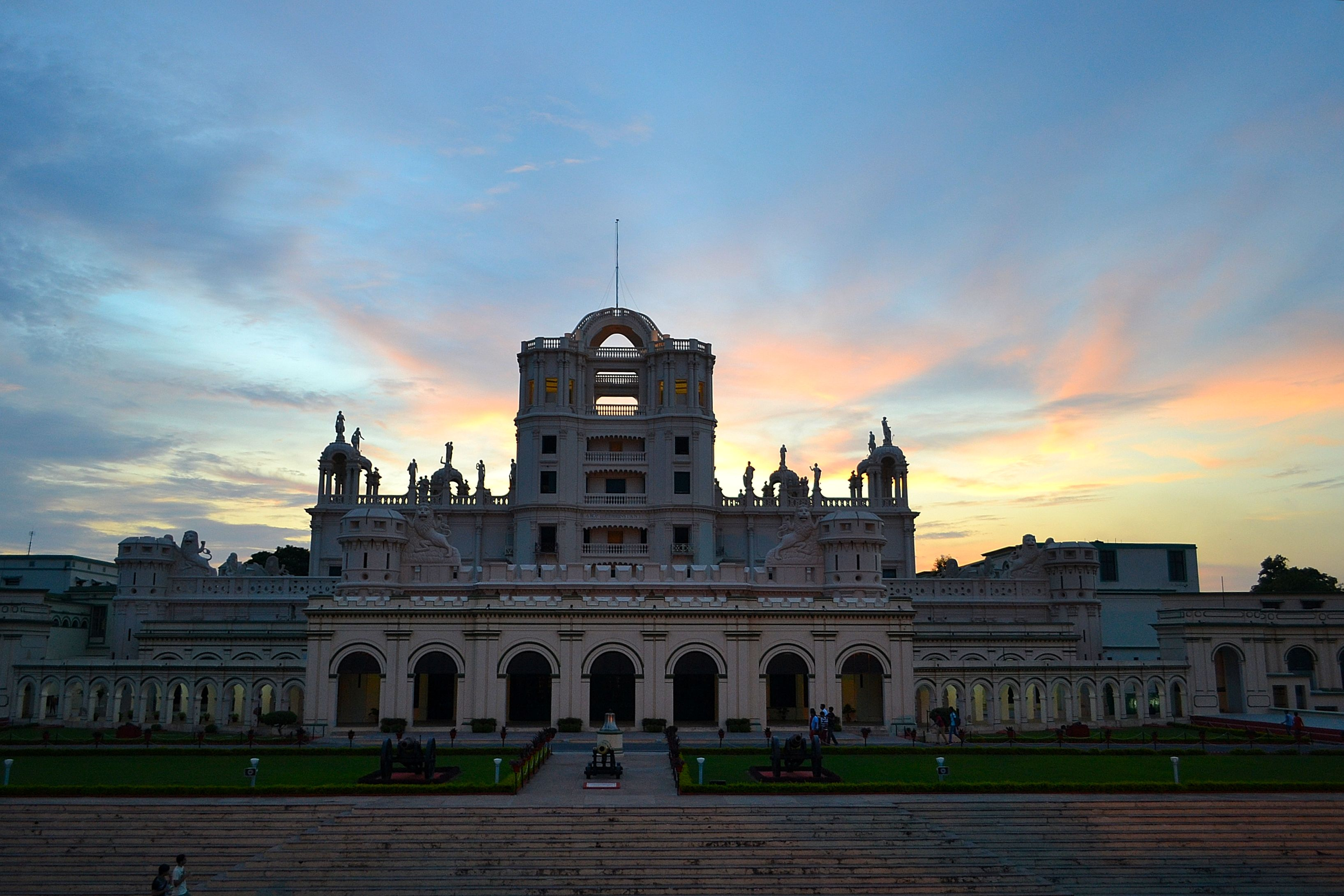
La Martinière College, Lucknow

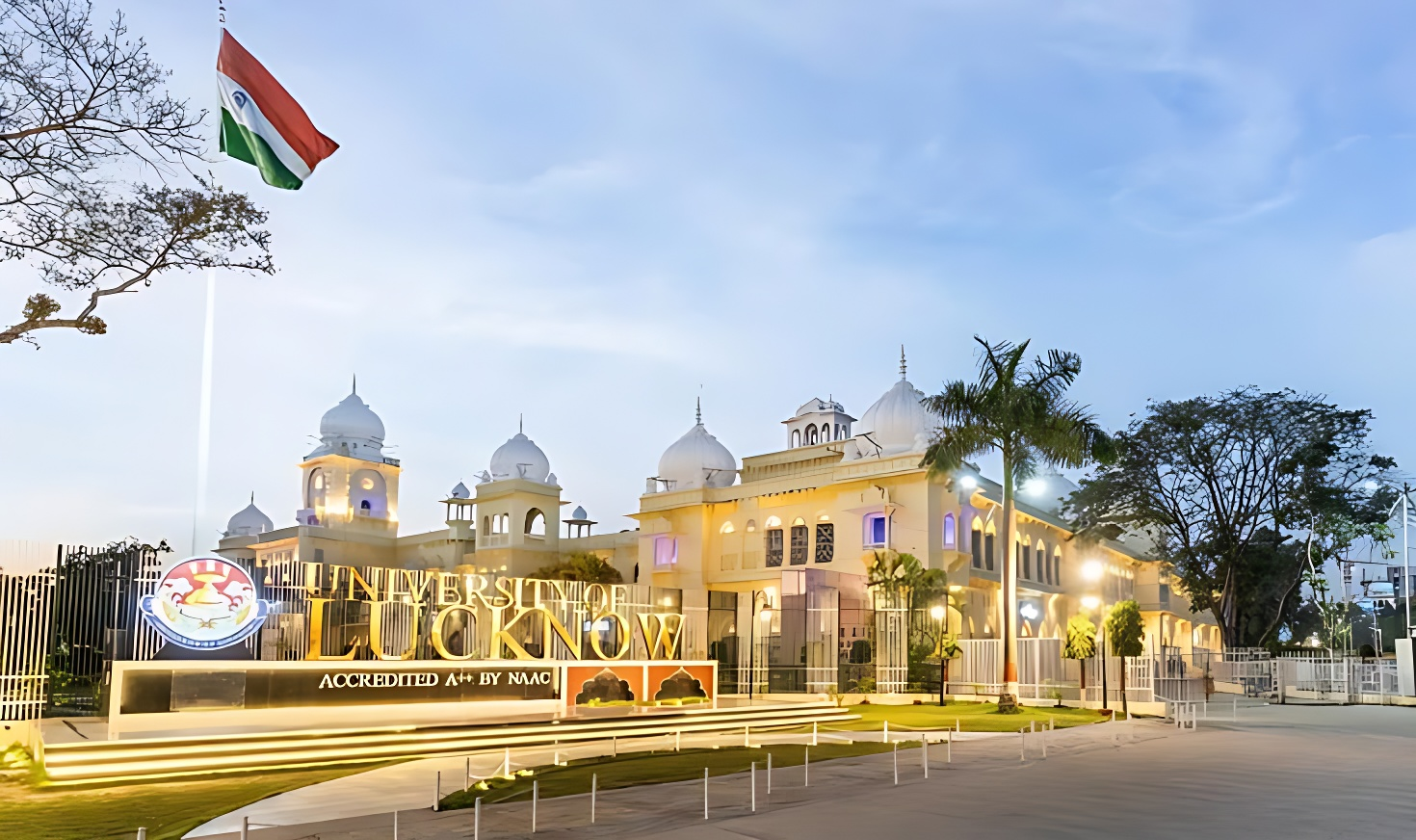
University of Lucknow

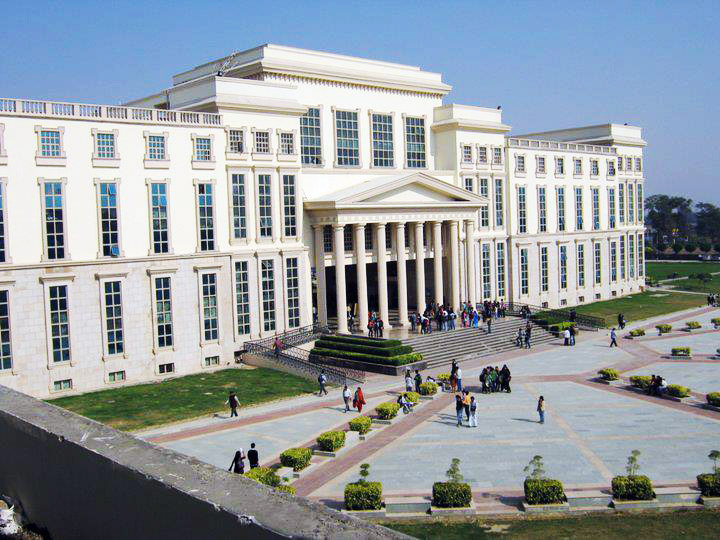
Amity University Lucknow Campus

== Universities ==
Lucknow has several universities, including central, state and private universities, as well as specialised institutions in fields such as medicine, technology, law, rehabilitation and languages.

University	Established	Type	Specialisation
King George's Medical University	1905	State	Medical and health sciences
University of Lucknow	1921	State	Multidisciplinary
Babasaheb Bhimrao Ambedkar University	1996	Central	Multidisciplinary
Dr. A.P.J. Abdul Kalam Technical University	2000	State	Engineering and technology
Integral University	2004	Private	Multidisciplinary
Dr. Ram Manohar Lohia National Law University	2005	State	Law
Dr. Shakuntala Misra National Rehabilitation University	2008	State	Rehabilitation and allied disciplines
Khwaja Moinuddin Chishti Languages University	2009	State	Language & Multidisciplinary
Babu Banarasi Das University	2010	Private	Multidisciplinary
Maharishi University of Information Technology	2014	Private	Multidisciplinary
Era University	2016	Private	Medical and health sciences
Atal Bihari Vajpayee Medical University	2019	State	Medical and health sciences
T. S. Mishra University	2023	Private	Medical and health sciences

=== Regional and off-campus centres ===
- Central Sanskrit University — 2002
- Amity University — 2004
- English and Foreign Languages University — 1979
- Maulana Azad National Urdu University — 2009
- Chandigarh University — 2024
- Rashtriya Raksha University — 2022

== Medical institutions ==
There are Medical Colleges in the city:

Institution	Established	Type
King George's Medical University	1906	Public
Sanjay Gandhi Postgraduate Institute of Medical Sciences	1983	Public
Era's Lucknow Medical College and Hospital	1997	Private
Dr. Ram Manohar Lohia Institute of Medical Sciences	2006	Public
GCRG Institute of Medical Sciences	2008	Private
Career Institute of Medical Sciences and Hospital	2011	Private
Integral Institute of Medical Sciences and Research	2013	Private
T.S. Misra Medical College and Hospital	2015	Private
Prasad Institute of Medical Sciences	2016	Private

== Degree and postgraduate colleges ==
Lucknow has many degree and postgraduate colleges affiliated with the University of Lucknow, offering undergraduate and postgraduate programmes primarily in the arts, sciences, commerce, humanities, social sciences and education. These include government, government-aided and self-financed institutions.

=== Government ===
- Institute of Co-operative and Corporate Management, Research & Training (ICCMRT) — 1978 (government institute; established by the Government of Uttar Pradesh)
- Antarrashtriya Bauddh Shodh Sansthan (International Buddhist Research Institute) — 1985 (government autonomous institute; established by the Government of Uttar Pradesh)
- Pt. Deen Dayal Upadhyay Rajkiya Kanya Mahavidyalaya — 1997 (government women's degree college)
- Neta Ji Subhash Chandra Bose Rajkiya Mahavidyalaya — 1997
- Maharaja Bijli Pasi Government P.G. College — 1999
- Mahamaya Rajkiya Mahavidyalaya— 2009

=== Government-aided ===
Government-aided colleges are privately managed institutions that receive financial grants from the government, particularly for approved expenses such as staff salaries. They function as separate institutions under their respective managements, while affiliation with the University of Lucknow provides the academic framework, including prescribed courses, examinations and the awarding of degrees.

- Isabella Thoburn College — 1886 (women's degree college; originally established as a girls' school in 1870)
- Lucknow Christian College — 1919 (degree college; originally established as a school in 1862)
- Shia College — 1922 (degree college; originally established as a school in 1919)
- Christian Training College — 1932
- Mahila Vidyalaya Degree College — 1939 (women's degree college; originally established as Hindu Girls School in 1895)
- Shri Jai Narain Misra P.G. College — 1946 (degree college; originally established as an Anglo-Sanskrit school in 1917)
- Karamat Husain Muslim Girls P.G. College — 1946 (women's degree college; originally established as a Muslim girls' school in 1912)
- D.A.V. College — 1948 (degree college; originally established as a school in 1918)
- Vidyant Hindu Degree College — 1954 (degree college; originally established as Vidyant Hindu School in 1938)
- B.S.N.V. P.G. College — 1954
- Shashi Bhushan Girls Degree College — 1954
- A. P. Sen Memorial Girls Degree College — 1955 (women's degree college; originally established as Mahakali Pathshala in 1902)
- Avadh Girls' College — 1958 (women's degree college; originally established as Loreto Degree College)
- Khun Khun Ji Girls P.G. College — 1959 (women's degree college; originally established as a girls' middle school in 1931)
- Nari Shiksha Niketan Girls P.G. College — 1963 (women's degree college)
- Kali Charan Degree College — 1973 (degree college; originally established as Kalicharan High School in 1913)
- National Post Graduate College — 1974
- Mumtaz Degree College — 1974 (women's degree college)

=== Self-financed ===
- Rajat Degree College — 1991
- Dr. Rajendra Prasad Memorial Degree College — 1997
- Sherwood College of Professional Management — 1997
- Unity P.G. College— 1998
- Shri Guru Nanak Girls Degree College — 2000
- School of Management Sciences — 2008
- Lucknow Public College of Professional Studies — 2009

Note: This is a selected, non-exhaustive list. The University of Lucknow maintains a complete directory of affiliated colleges.

== Management institutions ==
Lucknow has management institutes, which include IIM Lucknow. Lucknow University has a Business Administration department. There are institutes in the private sector.

- Ambalika Institute of Management and Technology
- Jaipuria Institute of Management, Lucknow
- School of Management Sciences, Lucknow
- IILM Academy of Higher Learning, Lucknow
- Institute of Cooperative and Corporate Management Research & Training (ICCMRT), Indira Nagar, Lucknow

== Engineering and technology ==
Lucknow district has the highest number of colleges affiliated with Dr. A.P.J. Abdul Kalam Technical University, with 80 colleges. These institutions primarily offer programmes in engineering, technology, management, pharmacy, computer applications and related fields.

- Indian Institute of Information Technology, Lucknow
- Institute of Engineering and Technology
- Shri Ram Murti Smarak College of Engineering and Technology, Lucknow
- SIMT (Sevdie Institute of Management & Technology), Lucknow
- Saroj Institute of Technology and Management, Lucknow
- B.N. College Of Engineering And Technology, Lucknow
- R. R. Group of Institutions

== Architecture ==
- Government College of Architecture

== Art and culture ==
- Bhatkhande Sanskriti Vishwavidyalaya

== Research institutes ==
Lucknow has research and development centres:

- Central Drug Research Institute
- Central Institute of Medicinal and Aromatic Plants
- Central Institute of Plastics Engineering and Technology
- Indian Institute of Toxicology Research (Formerly : Industrial Toxicology Research Centre (ITRC))
- National Botanical Research Institute
- Research Design and Standards Organisation
- Indian Institute of Sugarcane Research
- National Bureau of Fish and Genetic Resource (NBFGR), Ganga Aquarium

== Schools ==
- Aminabad Inter College, Lucknow
- AvR Academy, Lucknow
- Bal Vidya Mandir, Lucknow
- Bharatiya Vidya Bhavan
- C.P.L. Public Inter College, Nagram
- Capital Convent College, Lucknow
- Cathedral School of Lucknow
- Central Academy Senior Secondary School
- Chiranjiv Bharati Schools
- Christ Church, Lucknow
- City Convent School, Lucknow
- City International School, Lucknow
- City Montessori School
- Colvin Taluqdars' College
- D.A.V. Inter College, Lucknow
- Delhi Public School, Gomti Nagar, Lucknow
- Delhi Public School, Indira Nagar, Lucknow
- Exon Montessori School, Lucknow
- Foster Academy, Abrar Nagar, Kalyanpur, Lucknow
- Government Jubilee Inter College, Lucknow
- Guru Gobind Singh Sports College
- HAL School, Lucknow
- Kali Charan Inter College, Lucknow
- Kendriya Vidyalaya Sangathan
- La Martinière College, Lucknow
- Loreto Convent, Lucknow
- Lucknow International Public School
- Lucknow Nobel Academy, Chinhut, Lucknow
- Lucknow Public School
- Maharishi Vidya Mandir
- Mary Gardiner's Convent School
- Modern School, Lucknow
- New Public Collegiate, Lucknow
- Pioneer Montessori Inter College
- Rani Laxmi Bai Memorial Senior Secondary School
- Red Rose Senior Secondary School, Lucknow
- Seth M.R. Jaipuria School, Goel Campus, Lucknow
- Seth M.R. Jaipuria School, Lucknow
- SKD Academy
- Spring Dale College
- St. Agnes' Loreto Day School
- St. Antony's Inter College, Lucknow
- St. Dominic Savio College
- St. Fidelis College, Lucknow
- St. Francis' College, Lucknow
- St. John Bosco College, Gomti Nagar, Lucknow
- St. Mary's Convent Inter College, Lucknow
- St. Paul's College, Lucknow
- St. Thomas College, Lucknow
- Stella Maris Inter College, Lucknow
- The Millennium School, Lucknow
- U.P. Sainik School
- Vidya Ashram Career Institute, Lucknow

== Traditional and religious education ==
- Darul Uloom Nadwatul Ulama
- Sultanul Madaris

== Gallery ==
Colvin Taluqdars' College

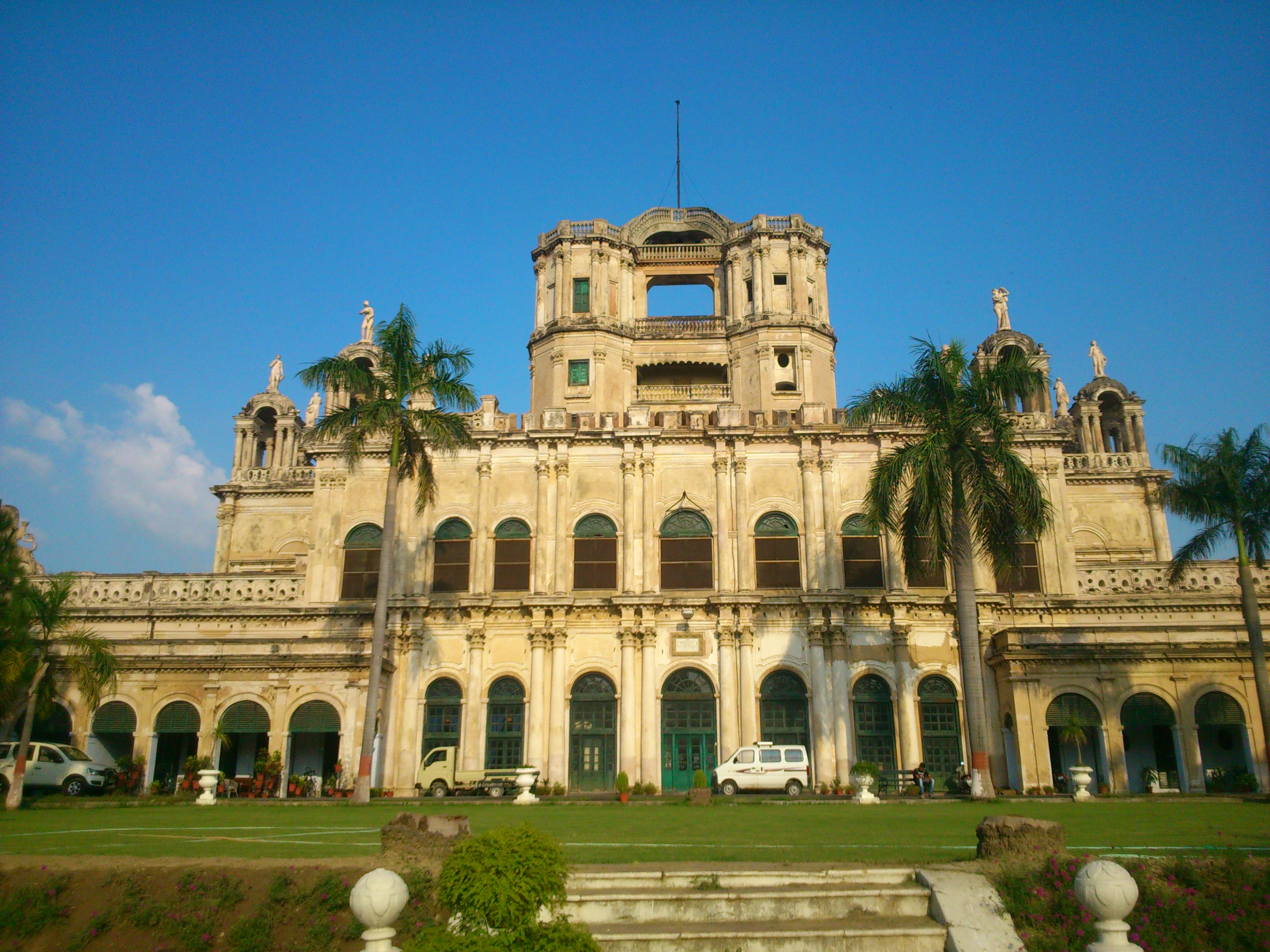
La Martiniere College

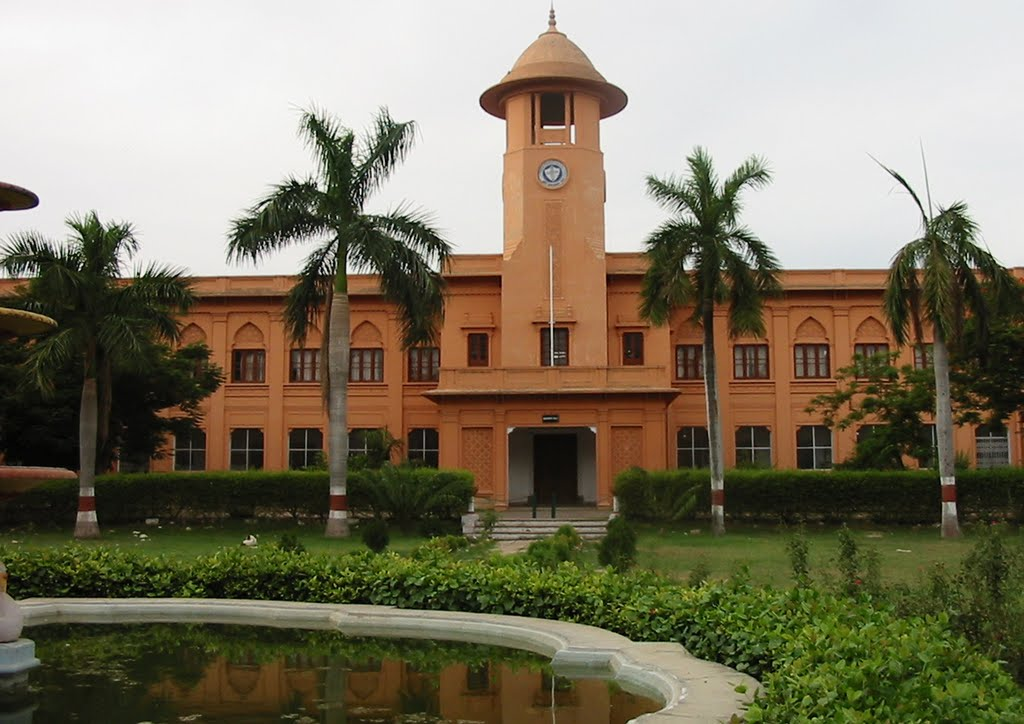
GGI Lucknow Christian College

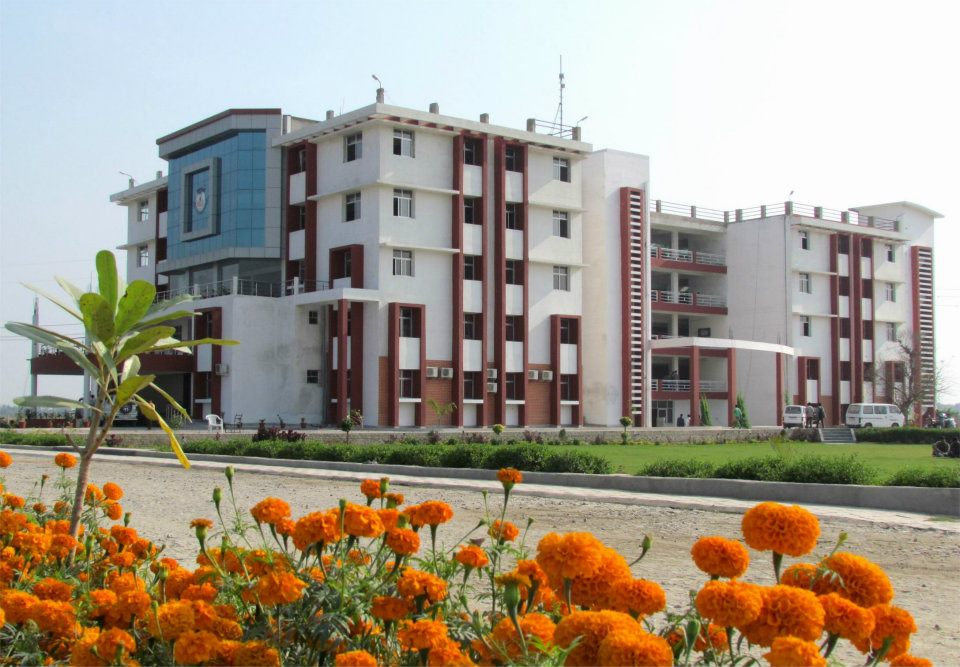
GGI Lucknow Integrated Campus

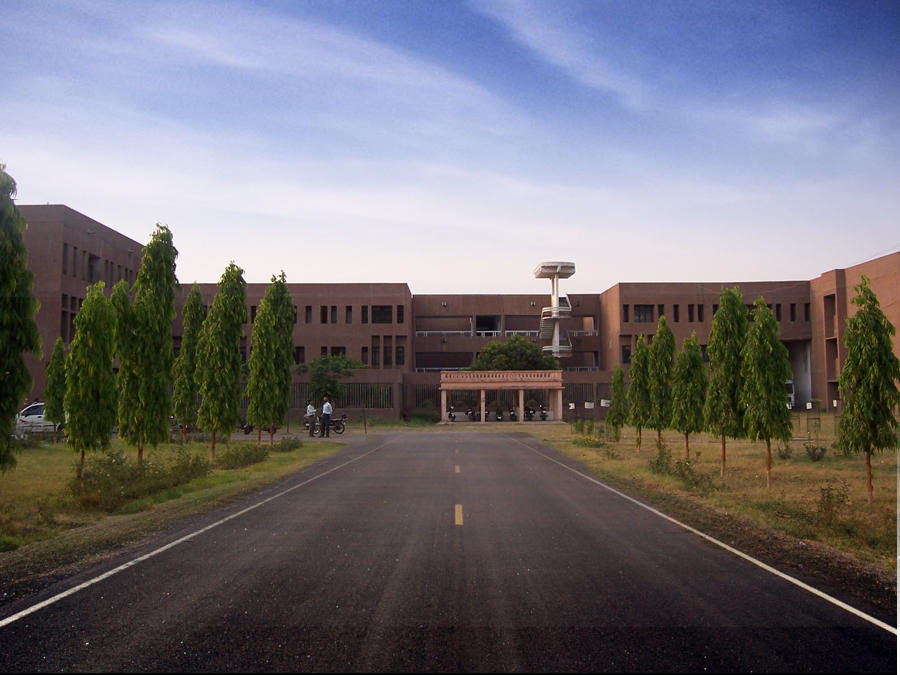
IET Lucknow

Kali Charan Inter College

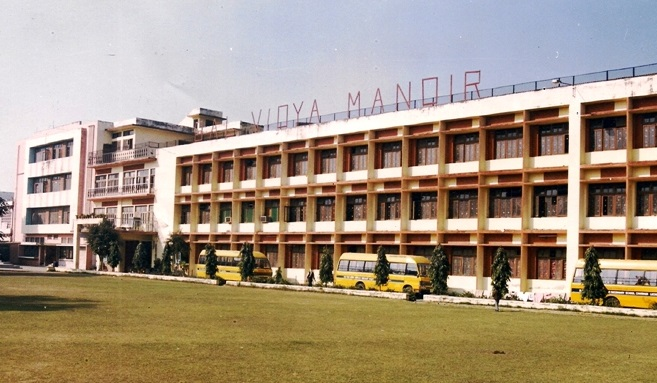
Bal Vidya Mandir, Lucknow

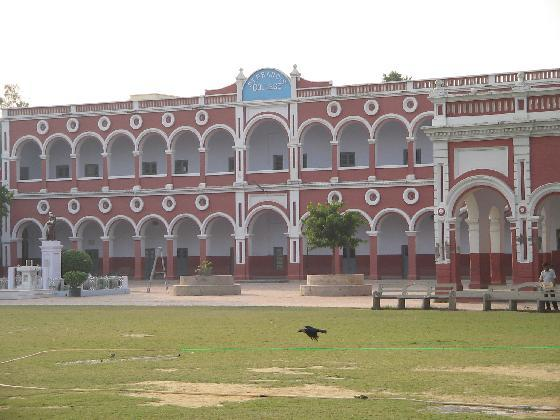
St. Francis' College

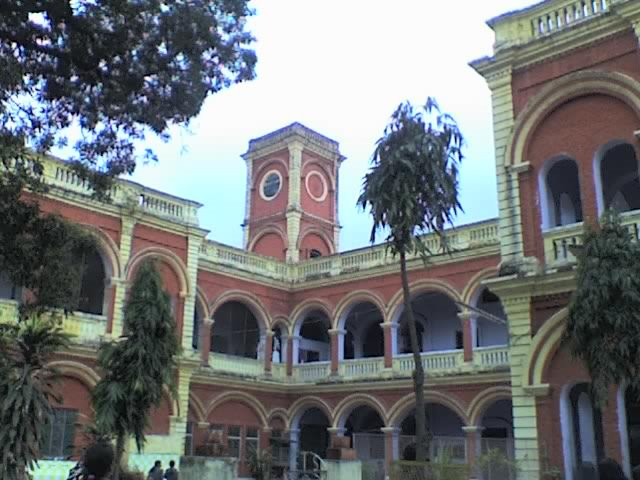
Emma Thompson School

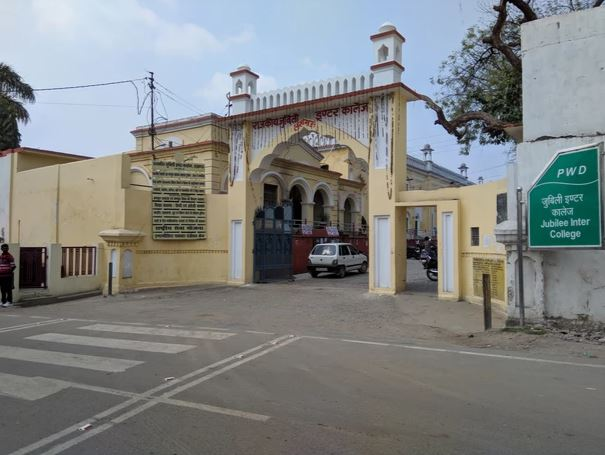
Govt. Jubilee Inter College

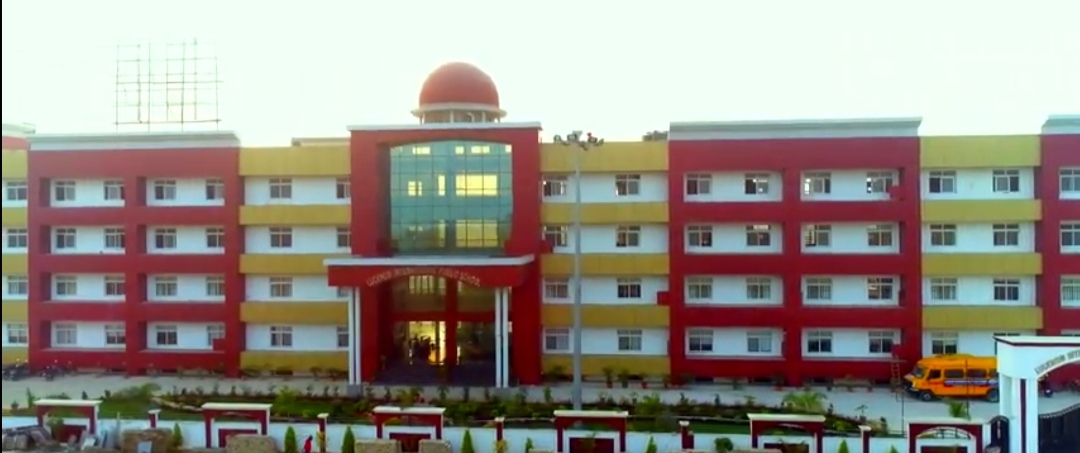
Lucknow International Public School
