= Bachelor of Business Science =

The Bachelor of Business Science (BBusSci) is a four-year honours level degree providing for a scientifically based study of economic and management sciences, "premised on the application of quantitative methods". The degree is offered in South Africa, and elsewhere in the Commonwealth.

== Structure ==
The BBusSci "allows for intensive specialization" in the degree major and thus comprises a four-year Honours level program. It differs from the Bachelor of Commerce (BComm) - the three year Bachelor's degree in business and economics usually offered in South Africa - in that, additional to the treatment of the major, all students are exposed to management theory in some depth. Further, majors in various quantitative-based subjects are available under the BBusSci, while these are not offered in (most) BComm programs; relatedly, all students must take a full first-year mathematics course, in addition to courses in statistics. For a comparison with other undergraduate degrees in business and management, see discussion under Business education, and compare Bachelor of Science in Business Administration.

A student reading the Business Science degree will be able to specialise in the following subjects:

- Accounting
- Actuarial science
- Computer science
- Economics
- Finance
- Information systems
- Law
- Marketing
- Organizational psychology
- Quantitative finance
- Quantitative management

== Institutions ==
The degree is offered by several South African universities (all offer the BComm): The University of Cape Town has offered the BBusSci degree since 1968; The University of KwaZulu Natal, Rhodes University and Monash University in South Africa have offered the degree more recently.

The University of the Witwatersrand (Wits) and UNISA both have departments of business and management "Science", although do not grant the BBusSci qualification; Wits, in its BComm, requires compulsory credits in "Computational Mathematics" (calculus and matrix algebra) and statistics, and allows Commerce students to major in quantitative subjects - if combined with economics - through the BEconSci.

Elsewhere, the degree is offered by the University of Delhi in India; by Strathmore University in Kenya and by the Faculty of Business in University of Moratuwa in Sri Lanka. In some universities in Spain, in Europe, such as Pompeu Fabra University in Barcelona, it is also offered as Bachelor in Business Sciences - Management.

== See also ==
- Bachelor of Accountancy
- Bachelor of Business
- Bachelor of Business Administration
- Bachelor of Commerce
- Bachelor of Economics
