= Haseri Asli =

Bruneian sprinter (born 1974)

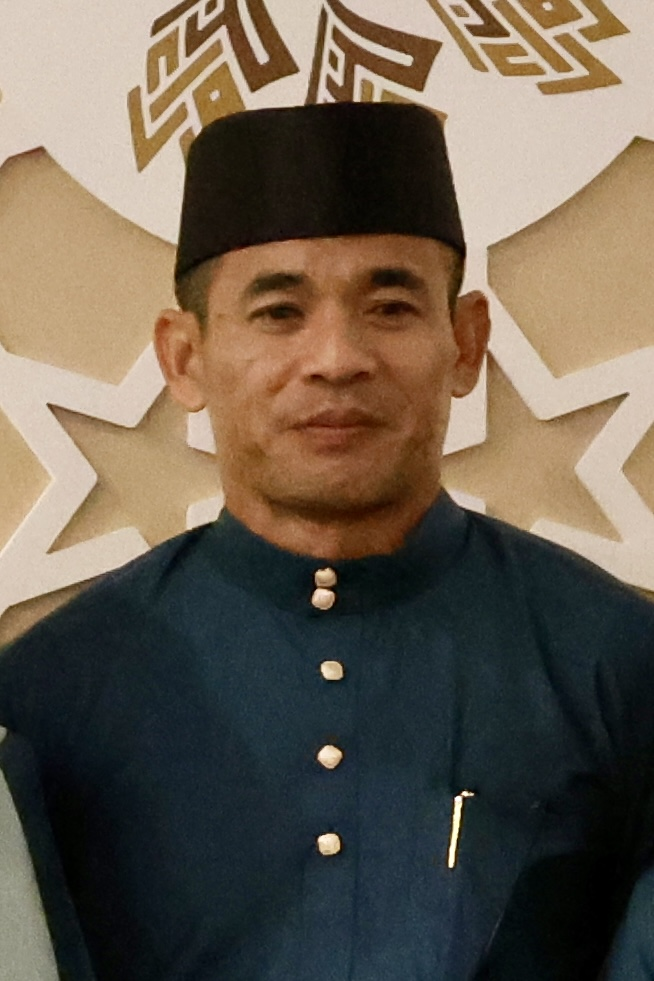
- Haseri in 2024

Personal information
- Born: Haseri bin Haji Asli; 9 March 1974 (age 52) Brunei

Sport
- Country: Brunei
- Sport: Athletics
- Event(s): 100 meters, 200 meters

Achievements and titles
- Personal bests: 100 m: 11.11 (Sydney 2000); 200 m: 22.91 (Seville 1999)

Haseri bin Haji Asli (9 March 1974) is a former Bruneian athlete who competed at the 2000 Summer Olympic Games in the Men's 100m, becoming the second athlete from his country to compete in the Olympic Games.

== Career ==
On 24 August 1999, a personal best was set by Haseri in the men's 200-meters during the 1999 IAAF World Championships, held at Isla de La Cartuja in Seville. The men's 200-meters had a minor headwind of -0.1 m/s and a winning time of 22.91 seconds. Another personal best was achieved at the 2000 Summer Olympics were finishing the men's 100-meters race in 11.11 seconds on 22 September 2000, at the Stadium Australia with a -0.6 m/s headwind. He finished 8th in his heat and failed to advance.

== Personal life ==
Haseri is married to Johariah Abdul Wahab, former ambassador of Brunei to the Philippines. Together, the couple has a single daughter.
