= Malai Halimah Yusoff =

Bruneian diplomat

Her Excellency Datin Paduka Malai Halimah Yusoff DPMB
- مالاي حليمة يوسف
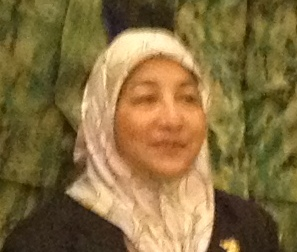
- Malai Halimah in 2014

Ambassador of Brunei to Vietnam
- Incumbent
- Assumed office November 2022

Ambassador of Brunei to France
- In office 9 November 2016 – September 2022
- Preceded by: Zainidi Sidup
- Succeeded by: Rakiah Abdul Lamit

Ambassador of Brunei to the Philippines
- In office September 2008 – September 2016
- Preceded by: Emaleen Abdul Rahman Teo
- Succeeded by: Johariah Abdul Wahab

Personal details
- Born: Brunei
- Education: University of Hertfordshire (BSc)
- Occupation: Diplomat

Malai Halimah binti Malai Yusoff is a Bruneian diplomat who has since become the ambassador of Brunei Darussalam to Vietnam in 2022. She became Ambassador of Brunei in the Philippines in 2008 and Monaco in 2018.

== Diplomatic career ==
Malai Halimah began working at the Ministry of Foreign Affairs of Brunei Darussalam's research office in 1983. She held the positions of assistant director for Southeast Asia, deputy director for Asia–Pacific, and director of analysis while there. She was named director of the political office in 2007 and appointed Ambassador of Brunei to the Philippines in 2008.

=== France ===
Pehin Yasmin met with Datin Malai Halimah and a number of other recently designated ambassadors on 30 August 2016. Yasmin congratulated them and gave them an update on Brunei's strategic interests in industry, energy, and climate change in relation to their assigned duties. Because France's largest oil and gas company, Total, is present in Brunei's energy sector, the two countries enjoy strong energy cooperation.

On 12 September 2017, at the OECD Headquarters in France, Brunei signed the Multilateral Convention on Mutual Administrative Assistance in Tax Matters, represented by Datin Paduka Malai Halimah, Ambassador to France. Deputy Secretary-General of the OECD, Masamichi Kono, presided over the signing event, which included 112 nations, including Singapore, Malaysia, Indonesia, and the Philippines. She presented her credentials as permanent delegate to the United Nations Education, Scientific and Cultural Organization (UNESCO) on 28 September 2017. From 14 to 15 November 2017, she attended the 21st session of the UNESCO General Assembly of State Parties. As the non-resident ambassador to Monaco, she presented her letter of credence to Prince Albert at Hôtel Hermitage Monte-Carlo on 13 March 2018.

Datin Malai Halimah spoke on behalf of Dato Hamzah at the 41st UNESCO General Conference in Paris, emphasising Brunei Darussalam's commitment to digital transformation in education. With a focus on educational technology, management technology, and enabling policies and infrastructure, she highlighted the creation of the Educational Technology Center and the Ministry of Education's Digital Transformation Plan, which aims to develop digitally literate learners through the integration of educational technology into teaching and learning processes.

=== Vietnam ===
As the new ambassador to Vietnam on 20 October 2022, Datin Malai Halimah received her letter of credence from Sultan Hassanal Bolkiah at Istana Nurul Iman. he and a few other recently appointed ambassadors met with Prince Al-Muhtadee Billah on 24 October. On 6 July 2023, in Hanoi, Prime Minister Phạm Minh Chính gave a reception for Datin Malai Halimah, the newly appointed ambassador of Brunei to Vietnam. Through increased visits, multilateral coordination, and the implementation of significant agreements, she would strengthen bilateral ties between Brunei and Vietnam throughout her term by focusing on oil and gas, chemicals, Halal food, and tourism.

== Honours ==
Throughout his career, she has received the following honours;

- Order of Seri Paduka Mahkota Brunei Second Class (DPMB; 15 September 2013) – Datin Paduka

Diplomatic posts
Preceded by Sahari Salleh	Ambassador of Brunei to Vietnam; November 2022 – present	Succeeded by Incumbent
Preceded by Zainidi Sidup	Ambassador of Brunei to France; 9 November 2016 – September 2022	Succeeded by Rakiah Abdul Lamit
Preceded by Emaleen Abdul Rahman Teo	Ambassador of Brunei to the Philippines; September 2008 – September 2016	Succeeded by Johariah Abdul Wahab
