= Bells University of Technology =

Private university in Ogun State, Nigeria

Coordinates: 6.68587°N 3.17110°E

- Other name: BellsTech
- Motto in English: Only the best is good for Bells
- Type: Private
- Established: 2004
- Chancellor: HE. Dr. Ibrahim Hassan Dankwanbo
- Vice-Chancellor: Prof. Jeremiah Ó. Ojediran
- Administrative staff: 37
- Students: >2,999
- Location: Ota, Ogun, Nigeria
- Campus: Urban
- Website: www.bellsuniversity.edu.ng

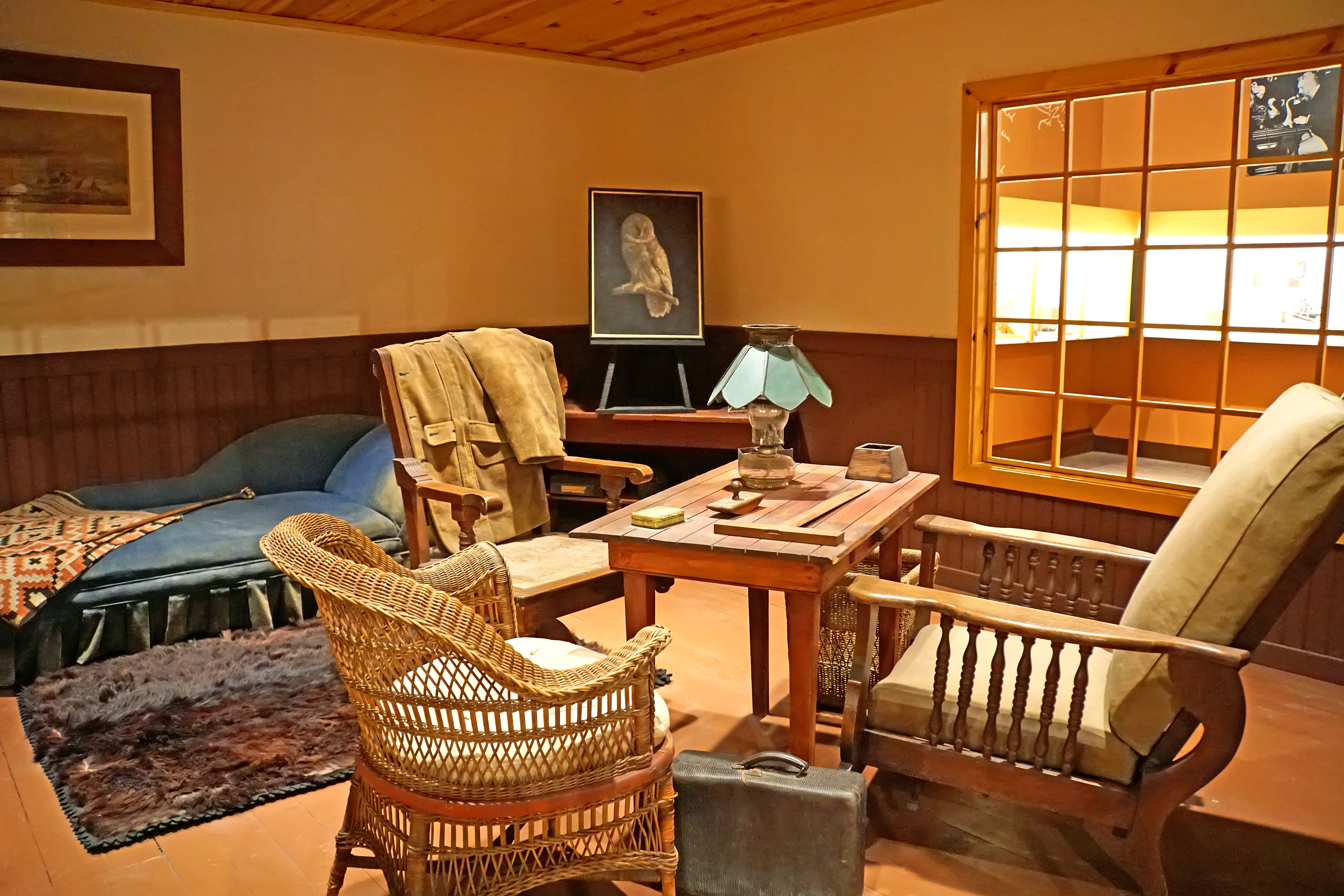
Reconstruction of Alexander Bell's office

Bells University of Technology (BUT), also known as Bellstech, is the first private university of technology established in Nigeria. It was established in 2004, and began admitting students from the 2005/2006 academic session. It is located in Ogun State of Nigeria.

== History ==
Bells was established in 2004 by The Bells Educational Foundation, which already ran nursery, primary and secondary schools. The Bells Educational Foundation is owned by Olusegun Obasanjo, former-President of Nigeria.

== Founder and Establishment ==
Bells University of Technology was established in 2005 as Nigeria’s first private university of technology. Situated in Ota, Ogun State, the institution was created to bridge the gap between theoretical education and practical technological innovation in Nigeria.

=== Establishment and Foundation ===
The university was founded by the Bells Educational Foundation, a private educational organization committed to advancing quality education in Nigeria. Before establishing the university, the foundation had already built a strong reputation through its nursery, primary, and secondary schools.

Following the Federal Government’s approval for private universities, the foundation applied for and received a licence from the National Universities Commission (NUC) on 9 June 2005. Academic activities officially commenced on 1 July 2005.

The core objective of the foundation was to develop a technology-driven institution that would produce graduates equipped with entrepreneurial skills, innovation capacity, and technical expertise necessary for national development.

=== Ownership and Proprietorship ===
The Bells Educational Foundation is owned by Olusegun Obasanjo, former President of Nigeria. As proprietor of the foundation, Obasanjo played a central role in the establishment and strategic direction of the university.

While the foundation is the formal founding body, Obasanjo’s ownership makes him the principal force behind the creation of Bells University. His long-standing advocacy for educational development and technological advancement in Nigeria significantly influenced the university’s mission and growth.

=== Growth and Impact ===
Since its establishment, Bells University of Technology has expanded its academic offerings across engineering, environmental sciences, natural and applied sciences, management sciences, and information technology. The institution continues to emphasize research, innovation, and industry collaboration, aligning with its founding vision of practical and solution-oriented education.

Today, Bells University stands as a symbol of private sector participation in Nigeria’s higher education system, reflecting the vision of the Bells Educational Foundation and the leadership of Olusegun Obasanjo.

== Colleges and departments ==
Bells is made up of seven colleges and thirty-five departments. Due to restructuring some colleges were merged and since 1 August 2016, it has three colleges: College of Engineering & Environmental Sciences, College of Natural & Applied Sciences and College of Management Sciences.

=== College of Natural and Applied Sciences (COLNAS) ===
- Physics with Electronics
- Applied Mathematics & Statistics
- Industrial Chemistry
- Biochemistry
- Chemistry
- Microbiology
- Aquaculture & Fisheries Mgt
- Computer Science
- Information Technology
- Food Technology
- Biotechnology
- Nutrition and Dietetics

=== College of Management Sciences (COLMANS) ===
- Business Administration with option in (Business Computing, Human Resources Management, International Business and Marketing)
- Management Technology with option in (Project management and Transport Management & Logistics)
- Accounting
- Banking and finance
- Economics

=== College of Engineering (COLENG) ===
- Mechanical Engineering
- Electrical/Electronics & Telecommunications Engineering
- Mechatronics Engineering
- Biomedical Engineering
- Computer Engineering
- Civil & Environmental Engineering

=== College of Environmental Sciences (COLENVS) ===
- Architecture
- Building Technology
- Estate Management
- Quantity Surveying
- Surveying and Geoinformatics
- Urban and Regional Planning

=== College of Food, Agricultural Science and Technology (COLFAST) ===
- Food Science and Technology
- Agriculture and Agricultural Technology

In 2024, Bells University gained accreditation from NUC for 13 courses

== Convocation ==
The 17th Convocation Ceremony of Bells University of Technology in Ota, Ogun State, Nigeria, took place in late October and early November 2025 as part of the institution’s 20th anniversary celebrations.

A pre-convocation lecture was delivered by Professor Tunji Olaopa, Chairman of the Federal Civil Service Commission, on 31 October 2025. His lecture addressed the theme of youth development, focusing on skills mismatch and unemployment in Nigeria’s national development.

The main convocation events were held on 1 November 2025 at the BUPF International Conference Centre, where degrees and diplomas were awarded to graduating students across undergraduate and postgraduate programmes. The ceremony also featured the conferment of honorary degrees and various cultural activities.

At the ceremony, the university reported that numerous students achieved high academic distinctions, including first-class honours and exceptional performance awards.

== Sports ==
Sports are an integral part of student life at Bells University of Technology. The university promotes active participation in variety of games such as football, basketball, volleyball, table tennis, Lawn tennis, Badminton, Athletics, Chess, Scrabble, encouraging students to balance academics with physical and mental development.

In addition, Bells University of Technology hosted the 2026 edition of the Nigerian Private Universities Games Association (NPUGA) Championships, bringing together private universities across Nigeria for a sporting event.

The competition featured five games: Football, Basketball, Table Tennis, Chess, and Scrabble, all marked by intense rivalry, impressive performances, and outstanding sportsmanship.

The championship not only showcased athletic and intellectual excellence but also strengthened unity and collaboration among participating institutions, leaving a lasting impact on student sports in Nigeria.

== Partnerships and Collaborations ==
Bells University of Technology has established partnerships with several institutions and organizations to enhance research, innovation, and academic development:

- Education Collaborative Consortium – Bells University joined the Education Collaborative, a network of higher education institutions aimed at sharing expertise, resources, and educational innovations, including opportunities for faculty and student exchanges, collaborative research, and curriculum development.
- DePECOS Institutions and Development Research Centre (DIaDeRC) – In May 2025, Bells University signed a five-year Memorandum of Understanding (MOU) with DIaDeRC to strengthen research capacity, focusing on grantsmanship and academic development.
- Academy of Innovative Research, Science & Technological Development (AcIRSTD) – A June 2025 MoU focuses on joint research initiatives, innovation activities, industry linkages, research commercialization, staff development, and collaborative symposia and conferences.
- International Institute of Tropical Agriculture (IITA) – Bells University has collaborated with IITA on agricultural research and incubation activities through its Centre for Agricultural Technology and Entrepreneurial Studies (CATES), providing joint programs and practical training opportunities.
- Nigeria Meteorological Agency (NiMet) – The university partnered with NiMet to establish a weather station on campus to support research, climate data collection, and smart agriculture initiatives.

== Rankings ==
According to EduRank 2025, Bells University of Technology is ranked globally 6,499 of 14,131 universities. In Africa, it is ranked 267 of 1,104 universities, and in Nigeria, it is ranked 59 of 157 universities.

== See also ==
Academic libraries in Nigeria
