= D.A.V. College, Lucknow =

Public college of the University of Lucknow

D.A.V. P.G. College
- Hindi: Dayanand Anglo Vaidik Mahavidyalaya
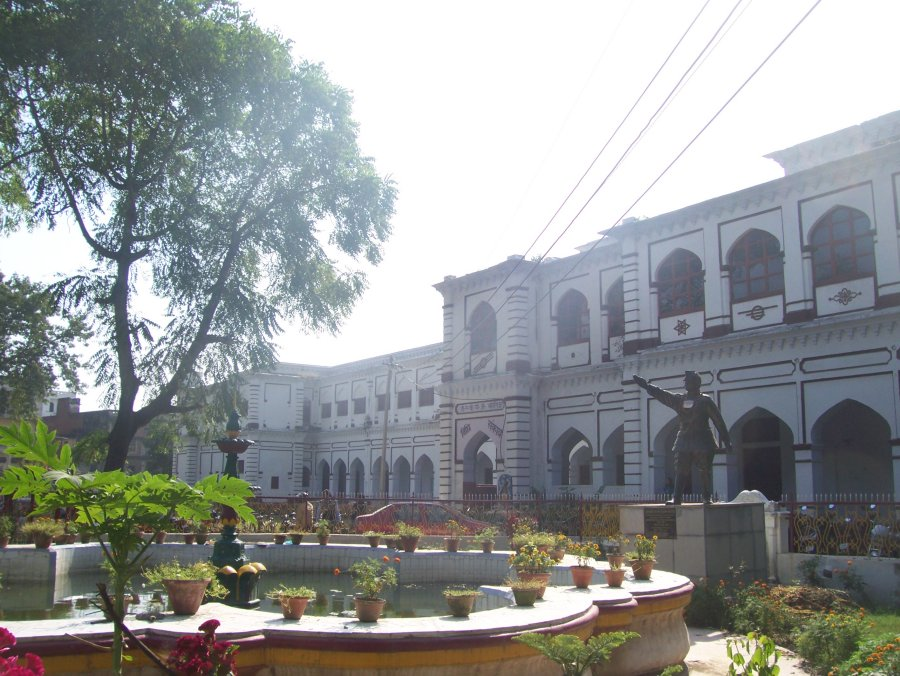
- Motto: तमसो मा ज्योतिर्गमय (Tamso mā jyotirgamaya) (Sanskrit)
- Motto in English: "Lead us from Darkness to light"
- Type: Public
- Established: 1919; 107 years ago
- Affiliations: University of Lucknow
- Academic affiliations: UGC; BCI
- Principal: Prof. (Dr.) Rajiv Kumar Tripathi
- Undergraduates: B.Sc, LL.B, B.A
- Postgraduates: M.A
- Location: Pt. Ras Bihari Tiwari Marg, Lucknow, Uttar Pradesh, 226004, India; 26°50′12″N 80°53′57″E
- Campus: 25 acres (10 ha); Urban
- Language: Hindi, English
- Colors: Saffron
- Website: website.davdegreelu.in

D.A.V. P.G. College also known as DAV Degree College is a Government-Aided degree college affiliated to the University of Lucknow and recognised by University Grants Commission. It was established in 1948 by Pandit Ras Bihari Tiwari and Shri Bhrigu Dutt Tiwari. It is based on the ideals of Dayananda Saraswati and Arya Samaj. The college has its origin in a school started in the premises of Arya Samaj temple in Ganeshganj locality in 1918. In 1926, the school shifted to the present premises, and graduate classes were started in 1956.

The main campus is situated in Arya Nagar, near Naka Hindola, 1 km from Charbagh Railway Station. It offers graduate courses in Arts, Law and Science stream. It has two campuses, one for Law and another for Arts And Science. In 2012, India Today placed the college amongst top 5 "Best Science Colleges in Lucknow".

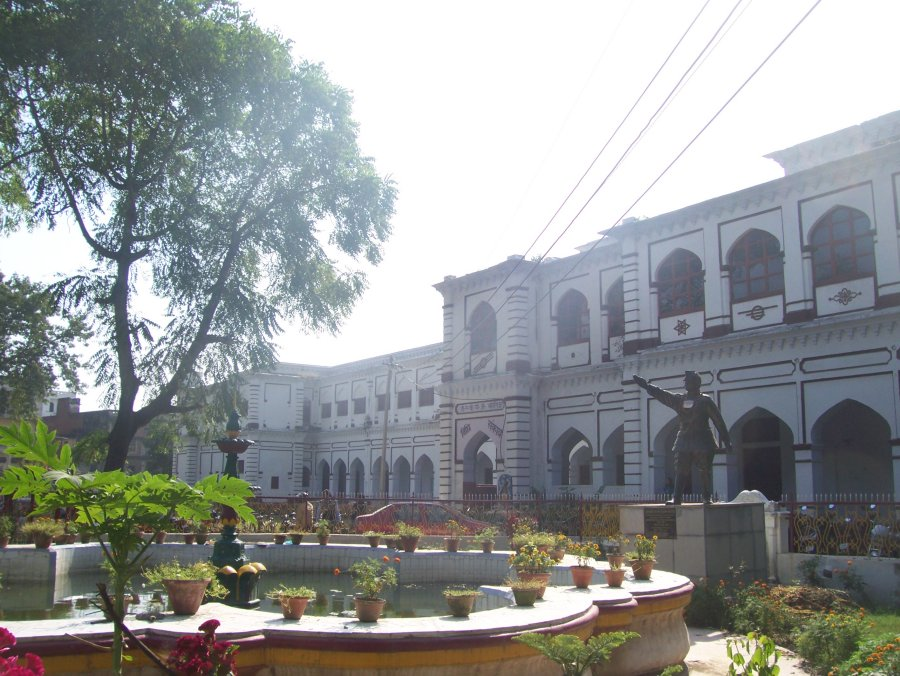

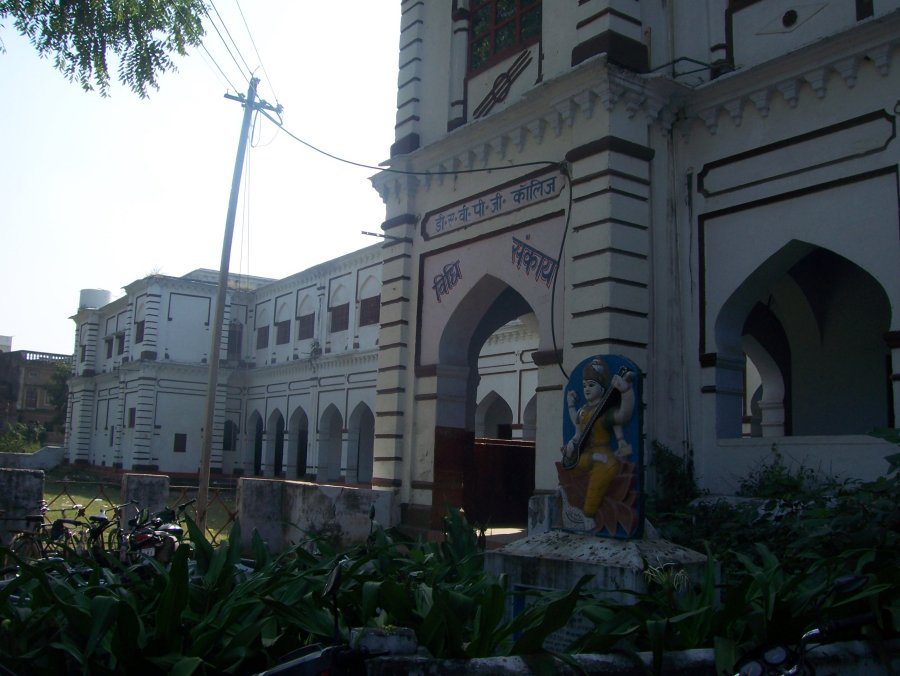
Campus

The college has an annual fest, Abhivyakyti, and reports contributions in its magazine, Deepshikha.

== See also ==
- Arya Samaj
- University of Lucknow
- List of educational institutions in Lucknow
- DAV College in Kanpur
