= Bachelor of Business =

Academic degree

A Bachelor of Business (BBus, BBus (Major)) is a three to four year undergraduate degree in the field of business offered by universities from the post-Dawkins era in Australia, New Zealand and Ireland. It is similar in format and structure to a Bachelor of Commerce (BCom), however it has unique features.

== Australia ==
In Australia, it was traditionally awarded by former non-university tertiary institutions which include institutes of technologies, such as Queensland University of Technology, RMIT University and the University of Technology, Sydney. Some former Institute of Technologies and Colleges such as Ballarat College of Advanced Education (University of Ballarat), Swinburne Institute of Technology (Swinburne University) the South Australia Institute of Technology (University of South Australia) and the Western Australia Institute of Technology (Curtin University of Technology) have renamed their Bachelor of Business programs to Bachelor of Commerce after achieving university status.

=== Popularity ===
Many universities such as Monash University and the University of Queensland are offering Bachelor of Business degrees as a way to further specialise students study needs while other universities such as University of New England, University of Tasmania, James Cook University, Griffith University and La Trobe University have replaced many of their Bachelor of Commerce programs with the Bachelor of Business program. Within Australia, Bachelor of Business degrees are as common as Bachelor of Commerce and Bachelor of Economics degrees.

== New Zealand ==
Bachelor of Business degrees are available at Massey University: Massey Business School, The University of Waikato: Waikato Management School, and Auckland University of Technology. Similar Bachelor's degrees in business are offered by certain institutions in New Zealand.

== Ireland ==
In Ireland this award is available as an honours degree Bachelor of Business (Hons) with a further one-year study than the ordinary level bachelor's degree.

== Examples ==
- Bachelor of Business (Accounting)
- Bachelor of Business (Applied Finance)
- Bachelor of Business (Banking)
- Bachelor of Business (Information Technology)
- Bachelor of Business (Economics)
- Bachelor of Business (Finance)
- Bachelor of Business (Hospitality Management)
- Bachelor of Business (Human Resource Management)
- Bachelor of Business (International Business)
- Bachelor of Business (Maritime and International Logistics Management)
- Bachelor of Business (Management)
- Bachelor of Business (Marketing)
- Bachelor of Business (Property)
- Bachelor of Business (Sport Management)
- Bachelor of Business (Tourism)
- Bachelor of Business (Legal Studies)

== Wikipedia ==
- Bachelor of Accountancy
- Bachelor of Business Administration
- Bachelor of Business Science
- Bachelor of Commerce
- Bachelor of Economics
- Master of Business
- Bachelor's degree
