= List of professional institutions in management =

The following is a list of professional institutes that specialise in management, business and related fields.

== Asia ==
- Goa Institute of Management
- Institute of Management of Sri Lanka
- Indian Institutes of Management
- Jaipuria Institute of Management
- Singapore Institute of Management

== Europe ==
- Chartered Institute of Personnel and Development
- Chartered Management Institute
- IMD Business School
- Institute of Administrative Management
- Institute of Leadership & Management
- Institute of Management Consultancy

== North America ==
- Management Institute of Canada

== Oceania ==
- Australian Institute of Management

== See also ==
- List of management topics
- Management
- Business administration
- Higher Education
