= Megawati Manan =

Bruneian diplomat

Her Excellency Megawati Manan
- ميڬاواتي منان
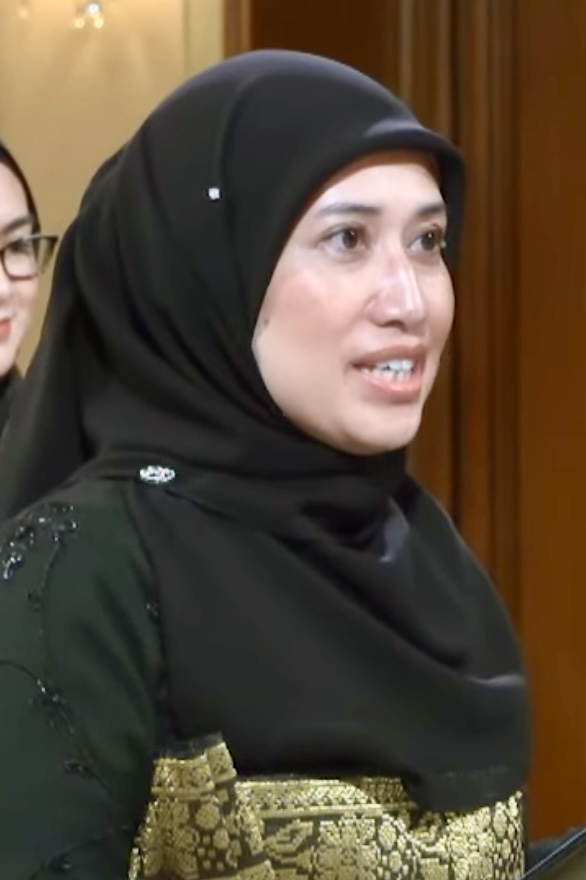
- Ambassador Megawati in 2023

Ambassador of Brunei to the Philippines
- Incumbent
- Assumed office 23 March 2023
- Preceded by: Johariah Abdul Wahab

Personal details
- Born: Brunei
- Spouse: Rahman Durahman (m. 1994)
- Children: 2
- Parent: Manan Osman (father)
- Occupation: Diplomat

Megawati binti Dato Paduka Haji Manan is a Bruneian diplomat and holding the post of Ambassador Extraordinary and Plenipotentiary of Brunei to the Philippines since 2023. Additionally, she is the alternate chair for Brunei in the Pacific Economic Cooperation Council (PECC).

== Diplomatic career ==
Megawati held the positions of National Coordinator for the Association of Southeast Asian Nations (ASEAN) Connectivity 2025 Masterplan, governor of Brunei Darussalam on the Asia–Europe Foundation (ASEF) board of governors, and director of the Ministry of Foreign Affairs' Department of Multilateral Cooperation. During a ceremony held in the Reception Hall of Malacañang Palace on 23 March 2023, President Bongbong Marcos accepted the credential letters from Megawati, the Ambassador of Brunei Darussalam to the Philippines.

During their July 2023 discussions at Camp Aguinaldo, Gilbert Teodoro and Megawati expressed their gratitude for the close defense ties between the two countries, which were demonstrated by Delfin Lorenzana's official visit to Brunei in 2022 and the dialogue initiatives under the ASEAN Defense Ministers' Meeting (ADMM).

Megawati and the Bruneian delegation participated in the 3rd Joint Commission for Bilateral Cooperation (JCBC) held in Metro Manila on 18 August 2023. Farm Konekt announced expansion into Brunei on 23 August, aiming to aid smallholder farmers with market access while facilitating access to Brunei's halal ecosystem for the Philippines through Megawati's technical assistance and support on bilateral policies. On 6 October, the Asian Center at the University of the Philippines Diliman (UPD) welcomed her in support of the university's internationalisation efforts, marking the first visit by a Bruneian ambassador to UPD and showcasing the embassy's interest in forging an institutional partnership ahead of the 40th anniversary of Brunei-Philippines diplomatic relations in 2024.

On 13 March 2024, Megawati threw a dinner event at the Dusit Thani Manila's Mayuree Grand Ballroom to commemorate the 40th anniversary of Brunei Darussalam's National Day. Later on 11 April, Megawati and her spouse threw a high tea celebration at the ambassador's home in honour of Eid al-Fitr. Along with partners and friends of the Bruneian embassy, the hosts were joined at the event by Robin Padilla and other envoys from different embassies were also present.

== Personal life ==
Megawati is the daughter of Koperasi Security Officer Training School's (KOPRI) CEO, Dato Paduka Haji Manan bin Osman. In 1994, she married Colonel (Retired) Rahman @ Abdul Rahman bin Haji Durahman (born 13 September 1970), former pilot in the Royal Brunei Air Force (RBAirF). They are parents to a girl and a son.

Diplomatic posts
Preceded by Johariah Abdul Wahab	Ambassador of Brunei to the Philippines; 23 March 2023 – present	Succeeded by Incumbent
