= Johariah Abdul Wahab =

Bruneian diplomat

- جوهارية عبد الوهاب
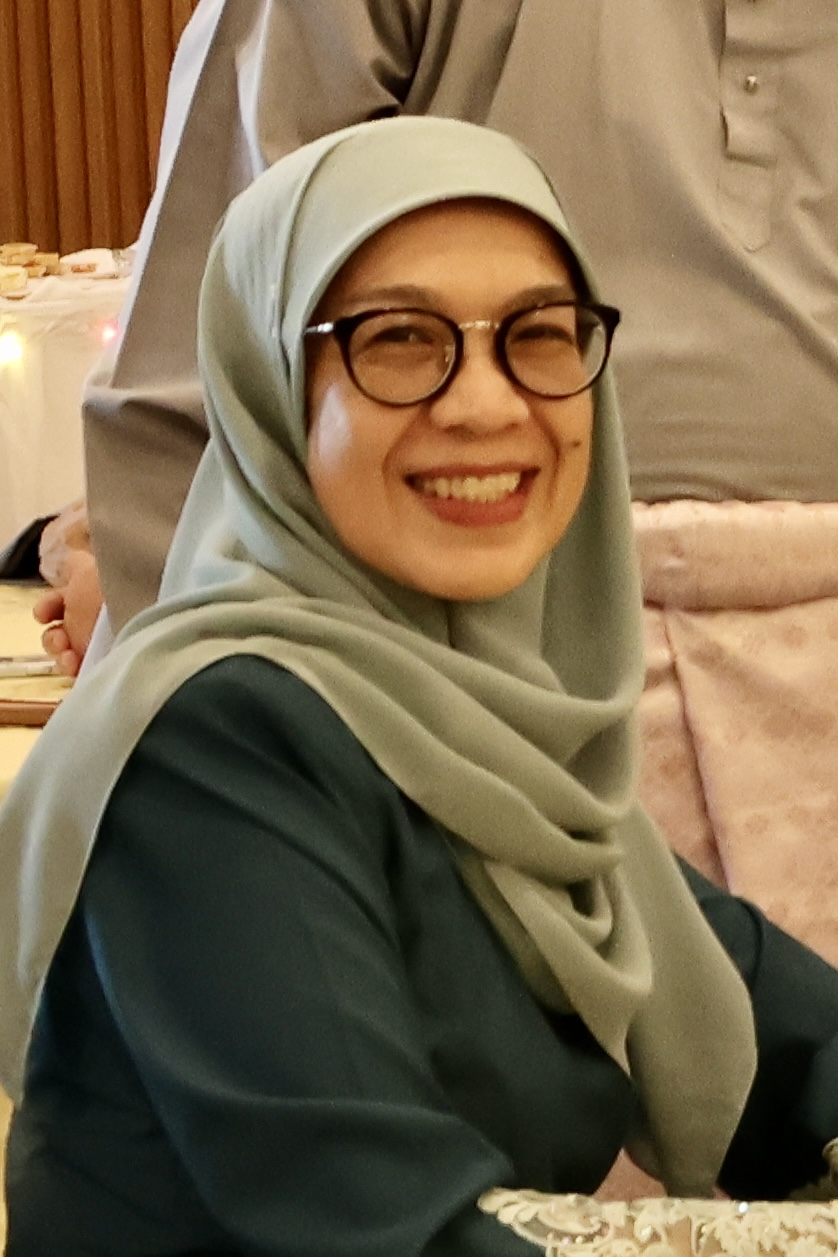
- Johariah in 2024

Ambassador of Brunei to the Philippines
- In office 6 December 2016 – 10 August 2022
- Preceded by: Malai Halimah Yusoff
- Succeeded by: Megawati Manan

Personal details
- Born: Brunei
- Spouse: Haseri Asli
- Children: 1
- Occupation: Diplomat

Johariah binti Haji Abdul Wahab is a Bruneian diplomat who previously held post of Ambassador Extraordinary and Plenipotentiary of Brunei to the Philippines from 2016 to 2022.

== Diplomatic career ==
=== Philippines ===
Johariah was once the Ministry of Foreign Affairs and Trade's (MOFAT) director of the ASEAN Department. On 25 October 2016, Johariah obtained her letter of credence from Sultan Hassanal Bolkiah. As the newly appointed Brunei Darussalam ambassador to the Philippines, she was given an audience by Prince Al-Muhtadee Billah. She paid a courtesy call to Dato Abdul Aziz, the deputy minister of defense, on 31 October, during which the minister urged closer cooperation with the RBAF personnel stationed there and ensuring their welfare, particularly that of the members of the International Monitoring Team (IMT) stationed in Mindanao. On 6 December, she passes by the honor guards on route to Malacañang Palace to give President Rodrigo Roa Duterte her credentials.

On 1 December 2019, Johariah was among the Bruneian officials who attended the 30th SEA Games opening. In a reciprocal courtesy call on 15 March 2021, the assistant secretary for Asian and Pacific Affairs met with her to discuss bolstering bilateral ties, particularly in the areas of trade and investment in Mindanao and the BIMP-EAGA region, as well as defense and logistics collaboration as the larger ASEAN region continues to grapple with the aftermath of the COVID-19 pandemic.

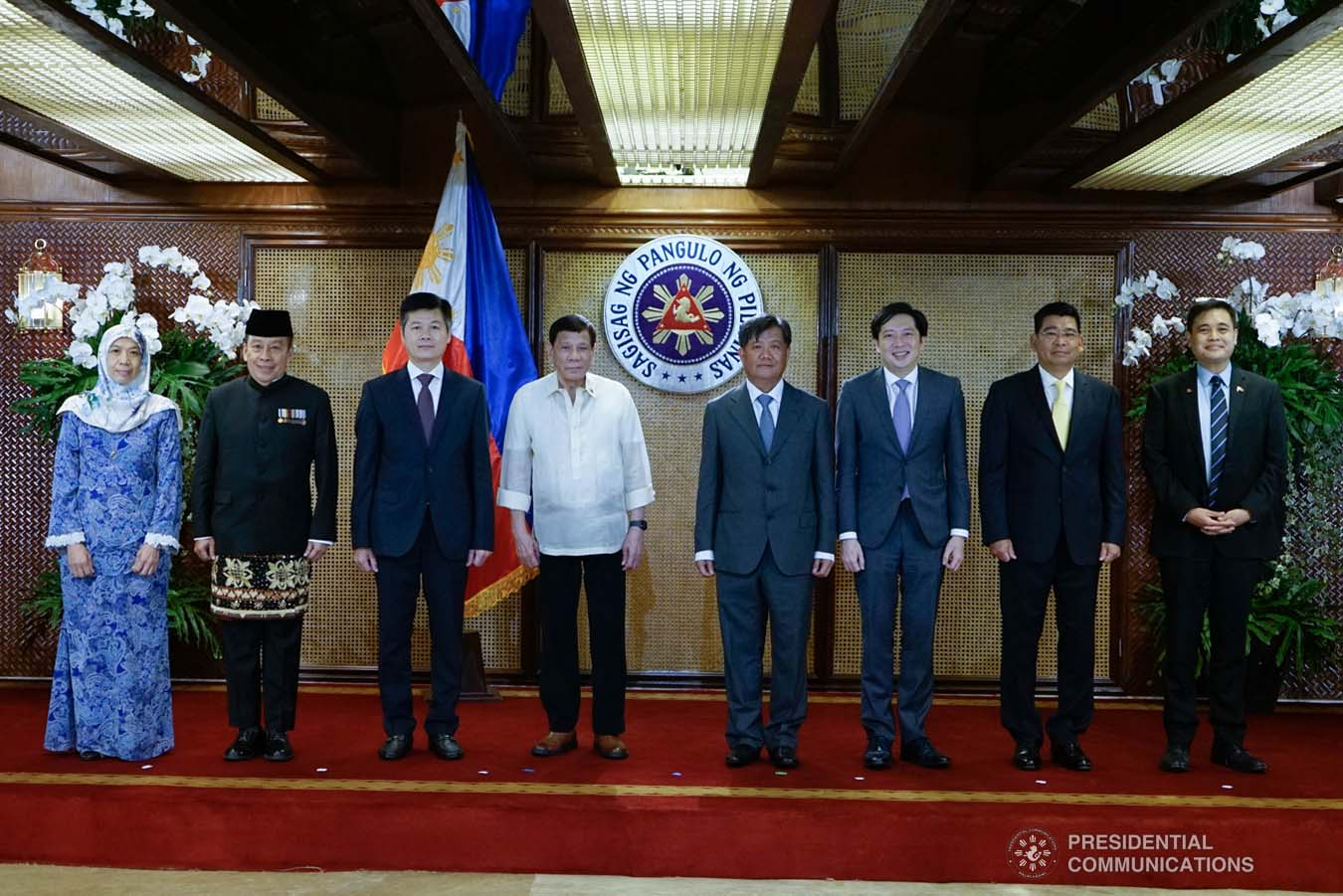
Johariah (blue) with President Duterte and ASEAN ambassadors in 2022

On 6 June 2022, she met with President-elect Bongbong Marcos at his Mandaluyong offices to convey both countries' determination to strengthen ties with the Philippines under the incoming government. During an informal visit at the Department of Foreign Affairs on 22 June 2022, Secretary of Foreign Affairs Teodoro Locsin Jr. and Johariah reviewed the significant advancements in ties between the Philippines and Brunei over the previous several years.

=== Ministry of Foreign Affairs ===
With effect from 10 August 2022, Sultan Hassanal Bolkiah gave his approval for Johariah to be appointed permanent secretary in the Ministry of Foreign Affairs (MFA). The President expressed gratitude on behalf of the whole country for Brunei Darussalam's ongoing efforts to strengthen ties between the two nations. Later on 26 August, President Bongbong Marcos hosted a goodbye call for her, the departing ambassador, at the music room at Malacañang Palace.

Johariah has represented Brunei in a number of summits and conferences since leaving her position as ambassador to the Philippines, including the ASEAN Political Security Council Meeting on 9 May 2023; co-chair of the 2nd ASEAN-UK Senior Officials’ Meeting on 8 June 2023; the ASEAN Foreign Ministers' Meeting at the ASEAN Post Ministerial Conference on 14 July 2023; and co-chair of the 31st ASEAN-New Zealand Dialogue on 19 April 2024.

As an honorary member of the ceremony, she attended the food festival's opening in Bandar Seri Begawan on 4 August 2023, in conjunction with the 50th anniversary of ASEAN-Japan Friendship and Cooperation, which was held at the Philippine embassy. The Secretary General of the ASEAN-China Center (ACC) had a meeting with her at Brunei's MFA on 29 February 2024.

== Personal life ==
Johariah is married to Haseri bin Haji Asli, a former national sprinter who competed in the 2000 Summer Olympics. The couple has one daughter together.

Diplomatic posts
Preceded by Malai Halimah Yusoff	Ambassador of Brunei to the Philippines; 6 December 2016 – 10 August 2022	Succeeded by Megawati Manan
