= List of ambassadors of Brunei to the Philippines =

Coordinates: 14.5541064°N 121.0192199°E

Ambassador of Brunei to the Philippines
- Sugo ng Brunei sa Pilipinas
- Emblem of Brunei

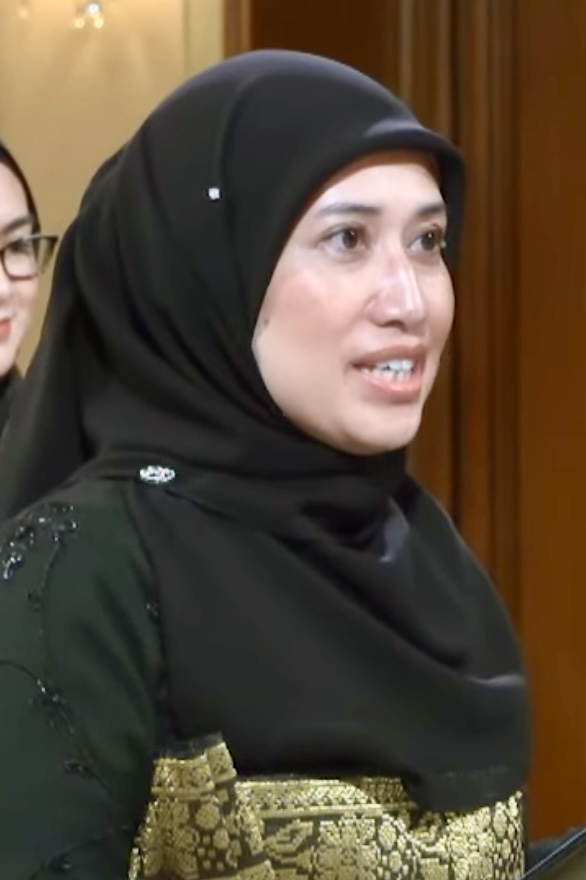
- Incumbent; Megawati Manan since 22 November 2019
- Style: Her Excellency
- Residence: Metro Manila
- Appointer: Sultan of Brunei
- Term length: At His Majesty's pleasure
- Inaugural holder: Malai Ahmad Murad
- Formation: 1 January 1984
- Website: Official website

The Bruneian ambassador in Metro Manila is the official representative of the Government in Bandar Seri Begawan to the Republic of the Philippines.

== List of ambassadors ==
Diplomatic agrément/Diplomatic accreditation	Ambassador	Observations	Prime Minister of Brunei	President of the Philippines	Term end
1993	Dato Paduka Haji Malai Ahmad Murad bin Haji Malai Mashhor		Hassanal Bolkiah	Fidel V. Ramos	1996
1996	Dato Paduka Haji Yahya bin Harris		Hassanal Bolkiah	Fidel V. Ramos	2002
6 August 2002	Datin Paduka Hajah Maimunah binti Dato Paduka Haji Elias	Datin Maimunah is awarded the Order of Sikatuna on 12 November 2004.	Hassanal Bolkiah	Gloria Macapagal Arroyo	2004
5 February 2005	Emaleen Abdul Rahman Teo	On 10 May 2005, Emaleen paid Senate President Franklin M. Drilon a visit at the Senate ceremonial hall to have a conversation. On 1 November 2006, Prince Abdul Qawi, Prince Al-Muhtadee Billah, and Princess Sarah made their formal arrival in Manila.	Hassanal Bolkiah	Gloria Macapagal Arroyo	3 September 2008
September 2008	Datin Paduka Hajah Malai Halimah binti Malai Haji Yusoff	President Benigno S. Aquino III visited Brunei from 1 to 2 June 2011. The president formally visited Brunei from 24–25 April 2013, and 9–10 October 2013, to attend the 22nd and 23rd ASEAN Summits and related summits, respectively. Sultan Hassanal Bolkiah's state visit to the Philippines from 15–16 April 2013.	Hassanal Bolkiah	Gloria Macapagal Arroyo	September 2016
6 December 2016	Hajah Johariah binti Haji Abdul Wahab	President Rodrigo R. Duterte paid a state visit to Brunei from 16–18 October 2016. Sultan Hassanal Bolkiah paid a state visit to the Philippines from 26–27 April 2017, then from 28–29 April 2017, he attended the 30th ASEAN Summit. President Duterte visited Brunei from 5–6 October 2017, to participate in the 50th Anniversary Celebrations of Sultan Hassanal Bolkiah's Accession to the Throne of Brunei.	Hassanal Bolkiah	Rodrigo Duterte	26 August 2022
23 March 2023	Megawati binti Dato Paduka Haji Manan		Hassanal Bolkiah	Bongbong Marcos	incumbent

== See also ==
- Brunei–Philippines relations
