= Modern School, Lucknow =

School in India

Coordinates: 26.8401°N 80.8791°E

Information
- Established: 1979
- Grades: K–12
- Gender: Mixed

Modern School, Lucknow is a co-educational K–12 day school based in Lucknow, India. It was the first school in India to be certified for ISO9001, on 30 February 1997.

== History ==
Established in 1979, and located at Aliganj, Lucknow, India, it is a co-educational K–12 day school run by Kapoor Educational Society. The school was founded by Shri Rakesh Kapoor, educationist and teacher of meditation, who was inspired by the message of Jiddu Krishnamurti. Mr R. K. Trivedi, former Governor of the State of Gujarat and Chief Election Commissioner of India is the patron of the school. The Chairman of the school's Advisory Council is Mr Justice D. K. Trivedi former Senior Judge of the High Court of the state of UP. The Principal is Ms. Meena Kane.

== Awards and recognition ==
Modern School was the first school in the history of Indian Education to be certified for ISO9002 and then ISO9001 (since May 1997)– a symbol of consistent quality control.

The Modern was awarded the Golden Peacock National Quality Training Award for excellence in staff training in 1998.

Since 16 January 2009, the school is the first school in India to be accredited to the Quality Council of India's NABET Standard for Quality School Governance.

The school is the first school in the city of Lucknow to implement the International Baccalaureate (IB) Primary Years Program (PYP), which is a Geneva-based curriculum framework, with over 2984 IB schools worldwide.

== Houses ==
It is involving IB PYP system from class Nur to 5. It has ICSE curriculum for grades 6 to 12.

The Modern School has four house named on the biggest leaders of the world:

- Krishnamurti - Blue Colour
- Geeta - Yellow Colour
- Socrates - Green Colour
- Vivekanada - Red Colour
