= Jaipuria Institute of Management =

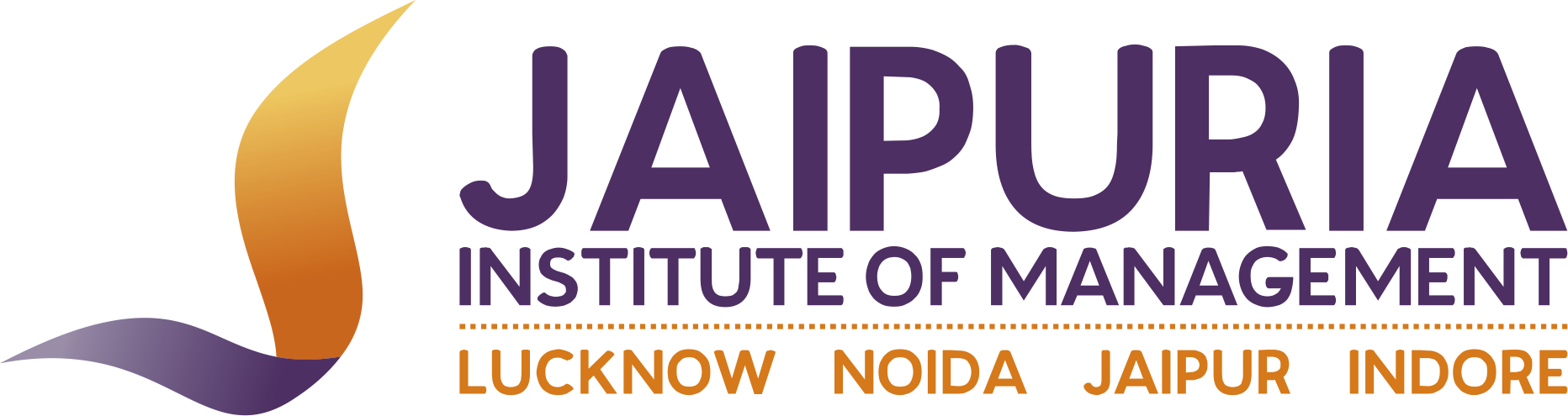
- Type: Private business school
- Established: 1995
- Founder: Jaipuria family
- Parent institution: Jaipuria Group
- Chairman: Sharad Jaipuria; Shreevats Jaipuria (Vice Chairman)
- Location: Lucknow; Noida; Jaipur; Indore, India
- Campus: Urban
- Website: www.jaipuria.ac.in

Jaipuria Institute of Management is a private business school in India offering postgraduate and doctoral programmes in management. It operates campuses in Lucknow, Noida, Jaipur, and Indore. The institute is accredited by the Association to Advance Collegiate Schools of Business (AACSB).

== History ==
The origins of the Jaipuria educational network date to 1945, when the Jaipuria family established Jaipuria College in Kolkata. The initiative was associated with Seth Mungtu Ram Jaipuria, who was awarded the Padma Bhushan by the Government of India in 1971. The Jaipuria Institute of Management was established in 1995 in Lucknow, Uttar Pradesh. The institute later expanded with campuses in Noida (2004), Jaipur (2006), and Indore (2010).

== Academics ==
The institute offers the Post Graduate Diploma in Management (PGDM), with specialisations in areas such as marketing and financial services. It also offers the Fellow Programme in Management (FPM), and executive education programmes. The curriculum includes case-based learning, industry projects, and research components.

== International collaborations ==
The institute maintains international collaborations with academic institutions. It has participated in the European Union-supported AIDEdu programme. Jaipuria Institute of Management also maintains academic collaborations with international institutions in Asia, Europe, and New Zealand, such as Rennes School of Business, Keele University, and Frankfurt School of Finance & Management.

== Accreditation ==
Jaipuria Institute of Management is accredited by the Association to Advance Collegiate Schools of Business (AACSB), an international accreditation held by a limited proportion of business schools worldwide. It is approved by the All India Council for Technical Education (AICTE), and its programs are accredited by the National Board of Accreditation (India). The institute has also received accreditation from the National Assessment and Accreditation Council.

== Rankings ==
Jaipuria Institute of Management is ranked among business schools in India by the National Institutional Ranking Framework (NIRF). In the NIRF 2025 management rankings, the Noida campus was ranked 41st, Lucknow 67th, Jaipur 74th, and Indore was placed in the 101–125 band. The institute has also appeared in other national rankings of business schools in India.
