= Index of management articles =

Listicle of management methods

This is a list of articles on general management and strategic management topics. For articles on specific areas of management, such as marketing management, production management, human resource management, information technology management, and international trade, see the list of related topics at the bottom of this page.

- Administration
- Management an overview
- Balanced scorecard
- Benchmarking
- Business intelligence
  - Industrial espionage
  - Environmental scanning
  - Marketing research
  - Competitor analysis
  - Reverse engineering
- Business continuity plan
- Business processes
- Operations
- Popular management theories : a critique
- Centralisation
- Change management
- Communications management
- Conjoint analysis
- Constraint Management
  - Focused improvement
- Corporate governance
  - Corporation
  - Board of directors
  - Middle management
  - Senior management
  - Corporate titles
  - Cross ownership
  - Community management
- Corporate image
- Cost management
  - Spend management
  - Procurement
- Crisis management
- Critical management studies
- Cultural intelligence
- Decentralisation
- Design management
- Diagnostic Enterprise Method
- Engineering Management
- Enterprise content management
  - Content management system
    - Web content management system
    - Document management system
  - Contract management
  - Fixed assets management
  - Records Management
- Enterprise resource planning
- Enterprise legal management
- Event management
- Extended Enterprise
- Facility management
- Force field analysis
- Fraud deterrence
- Management information systems
- Knowledge management
- Organizational development
- Overall Equipment Effectiveness
- Management fad
- Management information systems
- Management of Technology (MOT)
- Midsourcing
- Peter Drucker's Management by objectives (MBO)
- Management consulting
- Management science and operations research
- Manufacturing
  - Just In Time manufacturing
  - Lean manufacturing
- News management
- Planning
- Planning fallacy
- Professional institutions in management
- Quality management
- Value-based management
- Security management
  - Information security management
- Information management
- IT management
- Volatility, uncertainty, complexity and ambiguity
- Project management
- Risk management
- Supply chain management
- Governance, risk management, and compliance
- Operations, administration, and management
- Decision management
- Strategic management

== See also ==
- Outline of management
