= List of companies listed on the National Stock Exchange of India =

List of companies listed on the NSE

This is a list of companies listed on the National Stock Exchange of India (NSE).

== !–9 ==
Symbol	Company name
NSE: 20MICRONS	20 Microns Limited
NSE: 21STCENMGM	21st Century Management Services Limited
NSE: 3IINFOTECH	3i Infotech Limited
NSE: 3MINDIA	3M India Limited
NSE: 3PLAND	3P Land Holdings Limited
NSE: 3RDROCK	3rd Rock Multimedia Limited
NSE: 5PAISA	5Paisa Capital Limited
NSE: 63MOONS	63 Moons Technologies Limited

== A ==
Symbol	Company name
NSE: AMJUMBO	A and M Jumbo Bags Limited
NSE: ABINFRA	A B Infrabuild Limited
NSE: ABNINT	A B N Intercorp Limited
NSE: A2ZINFRA	A2Z Infra Engineering Limited
NSE: AAKASH	Aakash Exploration Services Limited
NSE: AARON	Aaron Industries Limited
NSE: AARTIDRUGS	Aarti Drugs Limited
NSE: AARTIIND	Aarti Industries Limited
NSE: AARVEEDEN	Aarvee Denims & Exports Limited
NSE: AARVI	Aarvi Encon Limited
NSE: AAVAS	Aavas Financiers Limited
NSE: ABAN	Aban Offshore Limited
NSE: ABB	ABB India Limited
NSE: POWERINDIA	ABB Power Products and Systems India Limited
NSE: ABMINTLTD	ABM International Limited
NSE: ACC	ACC Limited
NSE: ACCELYA	Accelya Solutions India Limited
NSE: ACCORD	Accord Synergy Limited
NSE: ACCURACY	Accuracy Shipping Limited
NSE: ACEINTEG	Ace Integrated Solutions Limited
NSE: ACE	Action Construction Equipment Limited
NSE: ADANIENT	Adani Enterprises Limited
NSE: ADANIGAS	Adani Gas Limited
NSE: ADANIGREEN	Adani Green Energy Limited
NSE: ADANIPORTS	Adani Ports and Special Economic Zone Limited
NSE: ADANIPOWER	Adani Power Limited
NSE: ADANITRANS	Adani Transmission Limited
NSE: ADFFOODS	ADF Foods Limited
NSE: ADHUNIKIND	Adhunik Industries Limited
NSE: ABCAPITAL	Aditya Birla Capital Limited
NSE: ABFRL	Aditya Birla Fashion and Retail Limited
NSE: BIRLAMONEY	Aditya Birla Money Limited
NSE: ADLABS	Adlabs Entertainment Limited
NSE: ADORWELD	Ador Welding Limited
NSE: ADROITINFO	Adroit Infotech Limited
NSE: ADVENZYMES	Advanced Enzyme Technologies Limited
NSE: ADVANIHOTR	Advani Hotels & Resorts (India) Limited
NSE: AEGISCHEM	Aegis Logistics Limited
NSE: AFFLE	Affle (India) Limited
NSE: AGARIND	Agarwal Industrial Corporation Limited
NSE: AGCNET	AGC Networks Limited
NSE: AGRITECH	Agri-Tech (India) Limited
NSE: AGROPHOS	Agro Phos India Limited
NSE: ATFL	Agro Tech Foods Limited
NSE: AHIMSA	Ahimsa Industries Limited
NSE: AHLADA	Ahlada Engineers Limited
NSE: AHLUCONT	Ahluwalia Contracts (India) Limited
NSE: AIAENG	AIA Engineering Limited
NSE: AIRAN	Airan Limited
NSE: AIROLAM	Airo Lam limited
NSE: AJANTPHARM	Ajanta Pharma Limited
NSE: AJMERA	Ajmera Realty & Infra India Limited
NSE: AJOONI	Ajooni Biotech Limited
NSE: AKASH	Akash Infra-Projects Limited
NSE: AKG	Akg Exim Limited
NSE: AKSHOPTFBR	Aksh Optifibre Limited
NSE: AKSHARCHEM	AksharChem India Limited
NSE: AKZOINDIA	Akzo Nobel India Limited
NSE: ALANKIT	Alankit Limited
NSE: ALBERTDAVD	Albert David Limited
NSE: ALCHEM	Alchemist Limited
NSE: ALEMBICLTD	Alembic Limited
NSE: APLLTD	Alembic Pharmaceuticals Limited
NSE: ALICON	Alicon Castalloy Limited
NSE: ALKALI	Alkali Metals Limited
NSE: ALKEM	Alkem Laboratories Limited
NSE: ALKYLAMINE	Alkyl Amines Chemicals Limited
NSE: ALLCARGO	Allcargo Logistics Limited
NSE: ADSL	Allied Digital Services Limited
NSE: ALLSEC	Allsec Technologies Limited
NSE: ALMONDZ	Almondz Global Securities Limited
NSE: ALOKINDS	Alok Industries Limited
NSE: ALPA	Alpa Laboratories Limited
NSE: ALPHAGEO	Alphageo (India) Limited
NSE: ALPSINDUS	Alps Industries Limited
NSE: AMARAJABAT	Amara Raja Batteries Limited
NSE: AMBANIORG	Ambani Organics Limited
NSE: AMBER	Amber Enterprises India Limited
NSE: AMBIKCO	Ambika Cotton Mills Limited
NSE: AMBUJACEM	Ambuja Cements Limited
NSE: AMDIND	AMD Industries Limited
NSE: ASIL	Amit Spinning Industries Limited
NSE: AMJLAND	Amj Land Holdings Limited
NSE: AMRUTANJAN	Amrutanjan Health Care Limited
NSE: ANANTRAJ	Anant Raj Limited
NSE: ANDHRACEMT	Andhra Cements Limited
NSE: ANDHRAPAP	Andhra Paper Limited
NSE: ANGELBRKG	Angel Broking Limited
NSE: AISL	ANI Integrated Services Limited
NSE: ANIKINDS	Anik Industries Limited
NSE: APCL	Anjani Portland Cement Limited
NSE: ANKITMETAL	Ankit Metal & Power Limited
NSE: ANSALHSG	Ansal Housing Limited
NSE: ANSALAPI	Ansal Properties & Infrastructure Limited
NSE: APARINDS	Apar Industries Limited
NSE: APCOTEXIND	Apcotex Industries Limited
NSE: APEX	Apex Frozen Foods Limited
NSE: APLAPOLLO	APL Apollo Tubes Limited
NSE: APOLLOHOSP	Apollo Hospitals Enterprise Limited
NSE: APOLLO	Apollo Micro Systems Limited
NSE: APOLLOPIPE	Apollo Pipes Limited
NSE: APOLSINHOT	Apollo Sindoori Hotels Limited
NSE: APOLLOTYRE	Apollo Tyres Limited
NSE: APTECHT	Aptech Limited
NSE: ARCHIDPLY	Archidply Industries Limited
NSE: ARCHIES	Archies Limited
NSE: ARCOTECH	Arcotech Limited
NSE: ARIES	Aries Agro Limited
NSE: ARIHANT	Arihant Foundations & Housing Limited
NSE: ARIHANTSUP	Arihant Superstructures Limited
NSE: ARMANFIN	Arman Financial Services Limited
NSE: AROGRANITE	Aro Granite Industries Limited
NSE: ARROWGREEN	Arrow Greentech Limited
NSE: ARSHIYA	Arshiya Limited
NSE: ARSSINFRA	ARSS Infrastructure Projects Limited
NSE: ARTNIRMAN	Art Nirman Limited
NSE: ARTEDZ	Artedz Fabs Limited
NSE: ARTEMISMED	Artemis Medicare Services Limited
NSE: ARVEE	Arvee Laboratories (India) Limited
NSE: ARVINDFASN	Arvind Fashions Limited
NSE: ARVIND	Arvind Limited
NSE: ARVSMART	Arvind SmartSpaces Limited
NSE: ASAHIINDIA	Asahi India Glass Limited
NSE: ASAHISONG	Asahi Songwon Colors Limited
NSE: ASCOM	Ascom Leasing & Investments Limited
NSE: ASHAPURMIN	Ashapura Minechem Limited
NSE: ASHIANA	Ashiana Housing Limited
NSE: ASHIMASYN	Ashima Limited
NSE: ASHOKLEY	Ashok Leyland Limited
NSE: ASHOKA	Ashoka Buildcon Limited
NSE: ASIANTILES	Asian Granito India Limited
NSE: AHLEAST	Asian Hotels (East) Limited
NSE: ASIANHOTNR	Asian Hotels (North) Limited
NSE: AHLWEST	Asian Hotels (West) Limited
NSE: ASIANPAINT	Asian Paints Limited
NSE: ASLIND	ASL Industries Limited
NSE: ASPINWALL	Aspinwall and Company Limited
NSE: ASALCBR	Associated Alcohols & Breweries Ltd.
NSE: ASTEC	Astec LifeSciences Limited
NSE: ASTERDM	Aster DM Healthcare Limited
NSE: ASTRAMICRO	Astra Microwave Products Limited
NSE: ASTRAL	Astral Limited
NSE: ASTRAZEN	AstraZeneca Pharma India Limited
NSE: ASTRON	Astron Paper & Board Mill Limited
NSE: ATLANTA	Atlanta Limited
NSE: ATLASCYCLE	Atlas Cycles (Haryana) Limited
NSE: ATNINTER	ATN International Limited
NSE: ATULAUTO	Atul Auto Limited
NSE: ATUL	Atul Limited
NSE: AUBANK	AU Small Finance Bank Limited
NSE: AURDIS	Aurangabad Distillery Limited
NSE: Aurionpro	Aurionpro Solutions Limited
NSE: AUROPHARMA	Aurobindo Pharma Limited
NSE: AUSOMENT	Ausom Enterprise Limited
NSE: AUTOIND	Autoline Industries Limited
NSE: AUTOLITIND	Autolite (India) Limited
NSE: AUTOAXLES	Automotive Axles Limited
NSE: ASAL	Automotive Stampings and Assemblies Limited
NSE: AVADHSUGAR	Avadh Sugar & Energy Limited
NSE: AVANTIFEED	Avanti Feeds Limited
NSE: AVENTUS	Aventus Buildcon Limited
NSE: DMART	Avenue Supermarts Limited
NSE: AVG	AVG Logistics Limited
NSE: AVROIND	Avro India Limited
NSE: AVSL	AVSL Industries Limited
NSE: AVTNPL	AVT Natural Products Limited
NSE: AXISBANK	Axis Bank Limited
NSE: AXISCADES	AXISCADES Engineering Technologies Limited
NSE: AYMSYNTEX	AYM Syntex Limited

== B ==
Symbol	Company name
NSE: BBTCL	B&B Triplewall Containers Limited
NSE: BLKASHYAP	B. L. Kashyap and Sons Limited
NSE: BAGFILMS	B.A.G Films and Media Limited
NSE: BABAFOOD	Baba Agro Food Limited
NSE: BAFNAPH	Bafna Pharmaceuticals Limited
NSE: BAJAJ-AUTO	Bajaj Auto Limited
NSE: BAJAJCON	Bajaj Consumer Care Limited
NSE: BAJAJELEC	Bajaj Electricals Limited
NSE: BAJFINANCE	Bajaj Finance Limited
NSE: BAJAJFINSV	Bajaj Finserv Limited
NSE: BAJAJHIND	Bajaj Hindusthan Sugar Limited
NSE: BAJAJHLDNG	Bajaj Holdings & Investment Limited
NSE: BALPHARMA	Bal Pharma Limited
NSE: BALAMINES	Balaji Amines Limited
NSE: BALAJITELE	Balaji Telefilms Limited
NSE: BALAXI	Balaxi Ventures Limited
NSE: BALKRISIND	Balkrishna Industries Limited
NSE: BALKRISHNA	Balkrishna Paper Mills Limited
NSE: BALLARPUR	Ballarpur Industries Limited
NSE: BALMLAWRIE	Balmer Lawrie & Company Limited
NSE: BALRAMCHIN	Balrampur Chini Mills Limited
NSE: BANARBEADS	Banaras Beads Limited
NSE: BANCOINDIA	Banco Products (I) Limited
NSE: BANDHANBNK	Bandhan Bank Limited
NSE: BANG	Bang Overseas Limited
NSE: BANKBARODA	Bank of Baroda
NSE: BANKINDIA	Bank of India
NSE: MAHABANK	Bank of Maharashtra
NSE: BANKA	Banka BioLoo Limited
NSE: BASML	Bannari Amman Spinning Mills Limited
NSE: BANARISUG	Bannari Amman Sugars Limited
NSE: BANSWRAS	Banswara Syntex Limited
NSE: BVCL	Barak Valley Cements Limited
NSE: BARTRONICS	Bartronics India Limited
NSE: BASF	BASF India Limited
NSE: BATAINDIA	Bata India Limited
NSE: BDR	BDR Buildcon Limited
NSE: BEARDSELL	Beardsell Limited
NSE: BEDMUTHA	Bedmutha Industries Limited
NSE: BEML	BEML Limited
NSE: BERGEPAINT	Berger Paints (I) Limited
NSE: BETA	Beta Drugs Limited
NSE: BFINVEST	BF Investment Limited
NSE: BFUTILITIE	BF Utilities Limited
NSE: BGRENERGY	BGR Energy Systems Limited
NSE: BHAGERIA	Bhageria Industries Limited
NSE: BHAGYANGR	Bhagyanagar India Limited
NSE: BHAGYAPROP	Bhagyanagar Properties Limited
NSE: BHALCHANDR	Bhalchandram Clothing Limited
NSE: BHANDARI	Bhandari Hosiery Exports Limited
NSE: BEPL	Bhansali Engineering Polymers Limited
NSE: BBL	Bharat Bijlee Limited
NSE: BDL	Bharat Dynamics Limited
NSE: BEL	Bharat Electronics Limited
NSE: BHARATFORG	Bharat Forge Limited
NSE: BHARATGEAR	Bharat Gears Limited
NSE: BHEL	Bharat Heavy Electricals Limited
NSE: BPCL	Bharat Petroleum Corporation Limited
NSE: BHARATRAS	Bharat Rasayan Limited
NSE: BRNL	Bharat Road Network Limited
NSE: BHARATWIRE	Bharat Wire Ropes Limited
NSE: BHARTIARTL	Bharti Airtel Limited
NSE: INFRATEL	Bharti Infratel Limited
NSE: BIL	Bhartiya International Limited
NSE: BIGBLOC	Bigbloc Construction Limited
NSE: BILENERGY	Bil Energy Systems Limited
NSE: BIOCON	Biocon Limited
NSE: BIOFILCHEM	Biofil Chemicals & Pharmaceuticals Limited
NSE: BIRLACABLE	Birla Cable Limited
NSE: BIRLACORPN	Birla Corporation Limited
NSE: BIRLATYRE	Birla Tyres Limited
NSE: BSOFT	Birlasoft Limited
NSE: BKMINDST	Bkm Industries Limited
NSE: BLBLIMITED	BLB Limited
NSE: BLISSGVS	Bliss GVS Pharma Limited
NSE: BLS	BLS International Services Limited
NSE: BLUECHIP	Blue Chip India Limited
NSE: BLUECOAST	Blue Coast Hotels Limited
NSE: BLUEDART	Blue Dart Express Limited
NSE: BLUESTARCO	Blue Star Limited
NSE: BODALCHEM	Bodal Chemicals Limited
NSE: BOHRA	Bohra Industries Limited
NSE: BBTC	Bombay Burmah Trading Corporation Limited
NSE: BOMDYEING	Bombay Dyeing & Mfg Company Limited
NSE: BRFL	Bombay Rayon Fashions Limited
NSE: BSHSL	Bombay Super Hybrid Seeds Limited
NSE: BORORENEW	Borosil Renewables Limited
NSE: BOSCHLTD	Bosch Limited
NSE: BPL	BPL Limited
NSE: BCONCEPTS	Brand Concepts Limited
NSE: BRIGADE	Brigade Enterprises Limited
NSE: BRIGHT	Bright Solar Limited
NSE: BCG	Brightcom Group Limited
NSE: BRITANNIA	Britannia Industries Limited
NSE: BROOKS	Brooks Laboratories Limited
NSE: BSE	BSE Limited
NSE: BSELINFRA	BSEL Infrastructure Realty Limited
NSE: BSL	BSL Limited
NSE: BURNPUR	Burnpur Cement Limited
NSE: BUTTERFLY	Butterfly Gandhimathi Appliances Limited
NSE: BSD	Best Stock Advisory

== C ==
Symbol	Company name
NSE: CANDC	C & C Constructions Limited
NSE: CADILAHC	Cadila Healthcare Limited
NSE: CADSYS	Cadsys (India) Limited
NSE: CALSOFT	California Software Company Limited
NSE: CTE	Cambridge Technology Enterprises Limited
NSE: CAMLINFINE	Camlin Fine Sciences Limited
NSE: CANFINHOME	Can Fin Homes Limited
NSE: CANBK	Canara Bank
NSE: CANTABIL	Cantabil Retail India Limited
NSE: CAPACITE	Capacit'e Infraprojects Limited
NSE: CAPTRUST	Capital Trust Limited
NSE: CAPLIPOINT	Caplin Point Laboratories Limited
NSE: CGCL	Capri Global Capital Limited
NSE: CARBORUNIV	Carborundum Universal Limited
NSE: CARERATING	CARE Ratings Limited
NSE: CAREERP	Career Point Limited
NSE: CASTEXTECH	Castex Technologies Limited
NSE: CASTROLIND	Castrol India Limited
NSE: CCL	CCL Products (India) Limited
NSE: CEATLTD	CEAT Limited
NSE: CELEBRITY	Celebrity Fashions Limited
NSE: CENTRALBK	Central Bank of India
NSE: CDSL	Central Depository Services (India) Limited
NSE: CENTRUM	Centrum Capital Limited
NSE: CENTUM	Centum Electronics Limited
NSE: CENTENKA	Century Enka Limited
NSE: CENTEXT	Century Extrusions Limited
NSE: CENTURYPLY	Century Plyboards (India) Limited
NSE: CENTURYTEX	Century Textiles & Industries Limited
NSE: CERA	Cera Sanitaryware Limited
NSE: CEREBRAINT	Cerebra Integrated Technologies Limited
NSE: CESC	CESC Limited
NSE: CESCVENT	CESC Ventures Limited
NSE: CGPOWER	CG Power and Industrial Solutions Limited
NSE: CHALET	Chalet Hotels Limited
NSE: CHAMBLFERT	Chambal Fertilizers & Chemicals Limited
NSE: CHEMBOND	Chembond Chemicals Ltd
NSE: CHEMCON	Chemcon Speciality Chemicals Limited
NSE: CHEMFAB	Chemfab Alkalis Limited
NSE: CHENNPETRO	Chennai Petroleum Corporation Limited
NSE: CHOLAHLDNG	Cholamandalam Financial Holdings Limited
NSE: CHOLAFIN	Cholamandalam Investment and Finance Company Limited
NSE: CHROMATIC	Chromatic India Limited
NSE: CIGNITITEC	Cigniti Technologies Limited
NSE: CNOVAPETRO	CIL Nova Petrochemicals Limited
NSE: CIMMCO	Cimmco Limited
NSE: CINELINE	Cineline India Limited
NSE: CINEVISTA	Cinevista Limited
NSE: CIPLA	Cipla Limited
NSE: CUB	City Union Bank Limited
NSE: CKPLEISURE	CKP Leisure Limited
NSE: CKPPRODUCT	CKP Products Limited
NSE: CLEDUCATE	CL Educate Limited
NSE: CLNINDIA	Clariant Chemicals (India) Limited
NSE: CMICABLES	CMI Limited
NSE: CMMIPL	CMM Infraprojects Limited
NSE: COALINDIA	Coal India Limited
NSE: COCHINSHIP	Cochin Shipyard Limited
NSE: COFORGE	Coforge Limited
NSE: COLPAL	Colgate Palmolive (India) Limited
NSE: CEBBCO	Commercial Engineers & Body Builders Co Limited
NSE: COMPINFO	Compuage Infocom Limited
NSE: COMPUSOFT	Compucom Software Limited
NSE: CAMS	Computer Age Management Services Limited
NSE: CONFIPET	Confidence Petroleum India Limited
NSE: CCCL	Consolidated Construction Consortium Limited
NSE: CONSOFINVT	Consolidated Finvest & Holdings Limited
NSE: CONCOR	Container Corporation of India Limited
NSE: CONTI	Continental Seeds and Chemicals Limited
NSE: CONTROLPR	Control Print Limited
NSE: CORALFINAC	Coral India Finance & Housing Limited
NSE: CORDSCABLE	Cords Cable Industries Limited
NSE: COROMANDEL	Coromandel International Limited
NSE: COSMOFILMS	Cosmo Films Limited
NSE: CCHHL	Country Club Hospitality & Holidays Limited
NSE: COUNCODOS	Country Condo's Limited
NSE: CKFSL	Cox & Kings Financial Service Limited
NSE: COX&KINGS	Cox & Kings Limited
NSE: CREATIVEYE	Creative Eye Limited
NSE: CREATIVE	Creative Peripherals and Distribution Limited
NSE: CREDITACC	CreditAccess Grameen Limited
NSE: CREST	Crest Ventures Limited
NSE: CRISIL	CRISIL Limited
NSE: CROMPTON	Crompton Greaves Consumer Electricals Limited
NSE: CROWN	Crown Lifters Limited
NSE: CSBBANK	CSB Bank Limited
NSE: CUBEXTUB	Cubex Tubings Limited
NSE: CUMMINSIND	Cummins India Limited
NSE: CUPID	Cupid Limited
NSE: CYBERTECH	Cybertech Systems And Software Limited
NSE: CYIENT	Cyient Limited

== D ==
Symbol	Company name
NSE: DBREALTY	D B Realty Limited
NSE: DPWIRES	D P Wires Limited
NSE: DPABHUSHAN	D. P. Abhushan Limited
NSE: DBCORP	D.B.Corp Limited
NSE: DABUR	Dabur India Limited
NSE: DALBHARAT	Dalmia Bharat Limited
NSE: DALMIASUG	Dalmia Bharat Sugar and Industries Limited
NSE: DAMODARIND	Damodar Industries Limited
NSE: DANGEE	Dangee Dums Limited
NSE: DATAMATICS	Datamatics Global Services Limited
NSE: DBSTOCKBRO	DB (International) Stock Brokers Limited
NSE: DCI	DC Infotech and Communication Limited
NSE: DCBBANK	DCB Bank Limited
NSE: DCM	DCM Limited
NSE: DCMFINSERV	DCM Financial Services Limited
NSE: DCMNVL	DCM Nouvelle Limited
NSE: DCMSHRIRAM	DCM Shriram Limited
NSE: DCW	DCW Limited
NSE: DENORA	De Nora India Limited
NSE: DSML	Debock Sales And Marketing Limited
NSE: DECCANCE	Deccan Cements Limited
NSE: DEEPIND	Deep Industries Limited
NSE: DEEPAKFERT	Deepak Fertilizers and Petrochemicals Corporation Limited
NSE: DEEPAKNTR	Deepak Nitrite Limited
NSE: DELTACORP	Delta Corp Limited
NSE: DELTAMAGNT	Delta Manufacturing Limited
NSE: DEN	Den Networks Limited
NSE: DEVIT	Dev Information Technology Limited
NSE: DHFL	Dewan Housing Finance Corporation Limited
NSE: DFMFOODS	DFM Foods Limited
NSE: DHAMPURSUG	Dhampur Sugar Mills Limited
NSE: DHANBANK	Dhanlaxmi Bank Limited
NSE: DHANUKA	Dhanuka Agritech Limited
NSE: DRL	Dhanuka Realty Limited
NSE: DHARSUGAR	Dharani Sugars & Chemicals Limited
NSE: DHUNINV	Dhunseri Investments Limited
NSE: DTIL	Dhunseri Tea & Industries Limited
NSE: DVL	Dhunseri Ventures Limited
NSE: DIAPOWER	Diamond Power Infra Ltd
NSE: DICIND	DIC India Limited
NSE: DGCONTENT	Digicontent Limited
NSE: DIGISPICE	DiGiSPICE Technologies Limited
NSE: DIGJAMLTD	Digjam Limited
NSE: DNAMEDIA	Diligent Media Corporation Limited
NSE: DBL	Dilip Buildcon Limited
NSE: DISHTV	Dish TV India Limited
NSE: DCAL	Dishman Carbogen Amcis Limited
NSE: DIVISLAB	Divi's Laboratories Limited
NSE: DIXON	Dixon Technologies (India) Limited
NSE: DLF	DLF Limited
NSE: DLINKINDIA	D-Link (India) Limited
NSE: DOLLAR	Dollar Industries Limited
NSE: DONEAR	Donear Industries Limited
NSE: DPSCLTD	DPSC Limited
NSE: DQE	DQ Entertainment (International) Limited
NSE: LALPATHLAB	Dr. Lal Path Labs Ltd.
NSE: DRREDDY	Dr. Reddy's Laboratories Limited
NSE: DREDGECORP	Dredging Corporation of India Limited
NSE: DRSDILIP	DRS Dilip Roadlines Limited
NSE: DUCON	Ducon Infratechnologies Limited
NSE: DWARKESH	Dwarikesh Sugar Industries Limited
NSE: DSSL	Dynacons Systems & Solutions Limited
NSE: DYNAMATECH	Dynamatic Technologies Limited
NSE: DYNPRO	Dynemic Products Limited

== E ==
Symbol	Company name
NSE: E2E	E2E Networks Limited
NSE: EASTSILK	Eastern Silk Industries Limited
NSE: EASUNREYRL	Easun Reyrolle Limited
NSE: EBIXFOREX	EbixCash World Money Limited
NSE: ECLERX	eClerx Services Limited
NSE: EDELWEISS	Edelweiss Financial Services Limited
NSE: EDUCOMP	Educomp Solutions Limited
NSE: EICHERMOT	Eicher Motors Limited
NSE: EIDPARRY	EID Parry India Limited
NSE: EIHAHOTELS	EIH Associated Hotels Limited
NSE: EIHOTEL	EIH Limited
NSE: EIMCOELECO	Eimco Elecon (India) Limited
NSE: ELECON	Elecon Engineering Company Limited
NSE: ELECTCAST	Electrosteel Castings Limited
NSE: ELECTHERM	Electrotherm (India) Limited
NSE: ELGIEQUIP	Elgi Equipments Limited
NSE: ELGIRUBCO	Elgi Rubber Company Limited
NSE: EMAMILTD	Emami Limited
NSE: EMAMIPAP	Emami Paper Mills Limited
NSE: EMAMIREAL	Emami Realty Limited
NSE: EMCO	Emco Limited
NSE: EMKAY	Emkay Global Financial Services Limited
NSE: EMKAYTOOLS	Emkay Taps and Cutting Tools Limited
NSE: EMIL	Electronics Mart India Limited
NSE: EMMBI	Emmbi Industries Limited
NSE: EDL	Empee Distilleries Limited
NSE: ENDURANCE	Endurance Technologies Limited
NSE: ENERGYDEV	Energy Development Company Limited
NSE: ENGINERSIN	Engineers India Limited
NSE: ENIL	Entertainment Network (India) Limited
NSE: EON	Eon Electric Limited
NSE: EQUITAS	Equitas Holdings Limited
NSE: EQUITASBNK	Equitas Small Finance Bank Limited
NSE: ERIS	Eris Lifesciences Limited
NSE: EROSMEDIA	Eros International Media Limited
NSE: ESABINDIA	Esab India Limited
NSE: ESCORTS	Escorts Limited
NSE: ESSARSHPNG	Essar Shipping Limited
NSE: ESSELPACK	Essel Propack Limited
NSE: ESTER	Ester Industries Limited
NSE: EUROCERA	Euro Ceramics Limited
NSE: EIFFL	Euro India Fresh Foods Limited
NSE: EUROMULTI	Euro Multivision Limited
NSE: EUROTEXIND	Eurotex Industries and Exports Limited
NSE: EVEREADY	Eveready Industries India Limited
NSE: EVERESTIND	Everest Industries Limited
NSE: EKC	Everest Kanto Cylinder Limited
NSE: EXCELINDUS	Excel Industries Limited
NSE: EXCEL	Excel Realty N Infra Limited
NSE: EXIDEIND	Exide Industries Limited
NSE: EXPLEOSOL	Expleo Solutions Limited

== F ==
Symbol	Company name
NSE: FAIRCHEM	Fairchem Speciality Limited
NSE: FCSSOFT	FCS Software Solutions Limited
NSE: FDC	FDC Limited
NSE: FMGOETZE	Federal-Mogul Goetze (India) Limited
NSE: FELIX	Felix Industries Limited
NSE: FACT	Fertilizers and Chemicals Travancore Limited
NSE: FIEMIND	Fiem Industries Limited
NSE: FILATEX	Filatex India Limited
NSE: FINEORG	Fine Organic Industries Limited
NSE: FCL	Fineotex Chemical Limited
NSE: FINCABLES	Finolex Cables Limited
NSE: FINPIPE	Finolex Industries Limited
NSE: FSL	Firstsource Solutions Limited
NSE: FLEXITUFF	Flexituff Ventures International Limited
NSE: FOCUS	Focus Lighting and Fixtures Limited
NSE: FORTIS	Fortis Healthcare Limited
NSE: FOSECOIND	Foseco India Limited
NSE: FOURTHDIM	Fourth Dimension Solutions Limited
NSE: FCONSUMER	Future Consumer Limited
NSE: FEL	Future Enterprises Limited
NSE: FLFL	Future Lifestyle Fashions Limited
NSE: FMNL	Future Market Networks Limited
NSE: FRETAIL	Future Retail Limited
NSE: FSC	Future Supply Chain Solutions Limited

== G ==
Symbol	Company name
NSE: GABRIEL	Gabriel India Limited
NSE: GAIL	GAIL (India) Limited
NSE: GALAXYSURF	Galaxy Surfactants Limited
NSE: GALLISPAT	Gallantt Ispat Limited
NSE: GALLANTT	Gallantt Metal Limited
NSE: GAMMNINFRA	Gammon Infrastructure Projects Limited
NSE: GANDHITUBE	Gandhi Special Tubes Limited
NSE: GANESHHOUC	Ganesh Housing Corporation Limited
NSE: GANECOS	Ganesha Ecosphere Limited
NSE: GANGAFORGE	Ganga Forging Limited
NSE: GANGESSECU	Ganges Securities Limited
NSE: GRSE	Garden Reach Shipbuilders & Engineers Limited
NSE: GARDENSILK	Garden Silk Mills Limited
NSE: GARFIBRES	Garware Technical Fibres Limited
NSE: GDL	Gateway Distriparks Limited
NSE: GATI	GATI Limited
NSE: GAYAHWS	Gayatri Highways Limited
NSE: GAYAPROJ	Gayatri Projects Limited
NSE: GBGLOBAL	GB Global Limited
NSE: GEPIL	GE Power India Limited
NSE: GET&D	GE T&D India Limited
NSE: GEECEE	GeeCee Ventures Limited
NSE: GEEKAYWIRE	Geekay Wires Limited
NSE: GICRE	General Insurance Corporation of India
NSE: GENESYS	Genesys International Corporation Limited
NSE: GENUSPAPER	Genus Paper & Boards Limited
NSE: GENUSPOWER	Genus Power Infrastructures Limited
NSE: GEOJITFSL	Geojit Financial Services Limited
NSE: GFLLIMITED	GFL Limited
NSE: GHCL	GHCL Limited
NSE: GISOLUTION	GI Engineering Solutions Limited
NSE: GICHSGFIN	GIC Housing Finance Limited
NSE: GILLANDERS	Gillanders Arbuthnot & Company Limited
NSE: GILLETTE	Gillette India Limited
NSE: GINNIFILA	Ginni Filaments Limited
NSE: GIRRESORTS	GIR Natureview Resorts Limited
NSE: GKWLIMITED	GKW Limited
NSE: GLAND	Gland Pharma Limited
NSE: GSKCONS	GlaxoSmithKline Consumer Healthcare Limited
NSE: GLAXO	GlaxoSmithKline Pharmaceuticals Limited
NSE: GLENMARK	Glenmark Pharmaceuticals Limited
NSE: GLOBAL	Global Education Limited
NSE: GLOBOFFS	Global Offshore Services Limited
NSE: GLOBALVECT	Global Vectra Helicorp Limited
NSE: GICL	Globe International Carriers Limited
NSE: GLOBE	Globe Textiles (India) Limited
NSE: GLOBUSSPR	Globus Spirits Limited
NSE: GMBREW	GM Breweries Limited
NSE: GMMPFAUDLR	GMM Pfaudler Limited
NSE: GMRINFRA	GMR Infrastructure Limited
NSE: GNA	GNA Axles Limited
NSE: GOACARBON	Goa Carbon Limited
NSE: GOCLCORP	GOCL Corporation Limited
NSE: GPIL	Godawari Power And Ispat limited
NSE: GODFRYPHLP	Godfrey Phillips India Limited
NSE: GODHA	Godha Cabcon & Insulation Limited
NSE: GODREJAGRO	Godrej Agrovet Limited
NSE: GODREJCP	Godrej Consumer Products Limited
NSE: GODREJIND	Godrej Industries Limited
NSE: GODREJPROP	Godrej Properties Limited
NSE: GOENKA	Goenka Diamond and Jewels Limited
NSE: GOKEX	Gokaldas Exports Limited
NSE: GOKULAGRO	Gokul Agro Resources Limited
NSE: GOKUL	Gokul Refoils and Solvent Limited
NSE: GOLDENTOBC	Golden Tobacco Limited
NSE: GOLDIAM	Goldiam International Limited
NSE: GOLDSTAR	Goldstar Power Limited
NSE: GOLDTECH	Goldstone Technologies Limited
NSE: GOODLUCK	Goodluck India Limited
NSE: GULFPETRO	GP Petroleums Limited
NSE: GPTINFRA	GPT Infraprojects Limited
NSE: GFSTEELS	Grand Foundry Limited
NSE: GRANULES	Granules India Limited
NSE: GRAPHITE	Graphite India Limited
NSE: GRASIM	Grasim Industries Limited
NSE: GRAVITA	Gravita India Limited
NSE: GREAVESCOT	Greaves Cotton Limited
NSE: GREENLAM	Greenlam Industries Limited
NSE: GREENPANEL	Greenpanel Industries Limited
NSE: GREENPLY	Greenply Industries Limited
NSE: GRETEX	Gretex Industries Limited
NSE: GRINDWELL	Grindwell Norton Limited
NSE: GRINFRA	G R Infraprojects Limited
NSE: GRPLTD	GRP Limited
NSE: GSS	GSS Infotech Limited
NSE: GTLINFRA	GTL Infrastructure Limited
NSE: GTL	GTL Limited
NSE: GTNIND	GTN Industries Limited
NSE: GTNTEX	GTN Textiles Limited
NSE: GTPL	GTPL Hathway Limited
NSE: GUFICBIO	Gufic Biosciences Limited
NSE: GUJALKALI	Gujarat Alkalies and Chemicals Limited
NSE: GAEL	Gujarat Ambuja Exports Limited
NSE: GUJAPOLLO	Gujarat Apollo Industries Limited
NSE: FLUOROCHEM	Gujarat Fluorochemicals Limited
NSE: GUJGASLTD	Gujarat Gas Limited
NSE: GIPCL	Gujarat Industries Power Company Limited
NSE: GLFL	Gujarat Lease Financing Limited
NSE: GMDCLTD	Gujarat Mineral Development Corporation Limited
NSE: GNFC	Gujarat Narmada Valley Fertilizers and Chemicals Limited
NSE: GPPL	Gujarat Pipavav Port Limited
NSE: GUJRAFFIA	Gujarat Raffia Industries Limited
NSE: GSCLCEMENT	Gujarat Sidhee Cement Limited
NSE: GSFC	Gujarat State Fertilizers & Chemicals Limited
NSE: GSPL	Gujarat State Petronet Limited
NSE: GULFOILLUB	Gulf Oil Lubricants India Limited
NSE: GULPOLY	Gulshan Polyols Limited
NSE: GVKPIL	GVK Power & Infrastructure Limited
NSE: GAL	Gyscoal Alloys Limited

== H ==
Symbol	Company name
NSE: HGINFRA	H.G. Infra Engineering Limited
NSE: HAPPSTMNDS	Happiest Minds Technologies Limited
NSE: HARITASEAT	Harita Seating Systems Limited
NSE: HARRMALAYA	Harrisons Malayalam Limited
NSE: HATHWAY	Hathway Cable & Datacom Limited
NSE: HATSUN	Hatsun Agro Product Limited
NSE: HAVELLS	Havells India Limited
NSE: HBSL	HB Stockholdings Limited
NSE: HBLPOWER	HBL Power Systems Limited
NSE: HCL-INSYS	HCL Infosystems Limited
NSE: HCLTECH	HCL Technologies Limited
NSE: HDFCAMC	HDFC Asset Management Company Limited
NSE: HDFCBANK	HDFC Bank Limited
NSE: HDFCLIFE	HDFC Life Insurance Company Limited
NSE: HCG	Healthcare Global Enterprises Limited
NSE: HECPROJECT	HEC Infra Projects Limited
NSE: HEG	HEG Limited
NSE: HEIDELBERG	HeidelbergCement India Limited
NSE: HERANBA	Heranba Industries Limited
NSE: HERCULES	Hercules Hoists Limited
NSE: HERITGFOOD	Heritage Foods Limited
NSE: HEROMOTOCO	Hero MotoCorp Limited
NSE: HESTERBIO	Hester Biosciences Limited
NSE: HEXATRADEX	Hexa Tradex Limited
NSE: HEXAWARE	Hexaware Technologies Limited
NSE: HFCL	HFCL Limited
NSE: HIKAL	Hikal Limited
NSE: HIL	HIL Limited
NSE: HILTON	Hilton Metal Forging Limited
NSE: HSCL	Himadri Speciality Chemical Limited
NSE: HIMATSEIDE	Himatsingka Seide Limited
NSE: HIRECT	Hind Rectifiers Limited
NSE: HINDALCO	Hindalco Industries Limited
NSE: HINDCON	Hindcon Chemicals Limited
NSE: HPIL	Hindprakash Industries Limited
NSE: HGS	Hinduja Global Solutions Limited
NSE: HAL	Hindustan Aeronautics Limited
NSE: HINDCOMPOS	Hindustan Composites Limited
NSE: HCC	Hindustan Construction Company Limited
NSE: HINDCOPPER	Hindustan Copper Limited
NSE: HMVL	Hindustan Media Ventures Limited
NSE: HINDMOTORS	Hindustan Motors Limited
NSE: HINDOILEXP	Hindustan Oil Exploration Company Limited
NSE: HINDPETRO	Hindustan Petroleum Corporation Limited
NSE: HINDUNILVR	Hindustan Unilever Limited
NSE: HINDZINC	Hindustan Zinc Limited
NSE: HINDNATGLS	Hindustan National Glass & Industries Limited
NSE: HISARMETAL	Hisar Metal Industries Limited
NSE: HITECHCORP	Hitech Corporation Limited
NSE: HITECH	Hi-Tech Pipes Limited
NSE: HLVLTD	HLV Limited
NSE: HMT	HMT Limited
NSE: HONDAPOWER	Honda Siel Power Products Limited
NSE: HONAUT	Honeywell Automation India Limited
NSE: HOTELRUGBY	Hotel Rugby Limited
NSE: HUDCO	Housing & Urban Development Corporation Limited
NSE: HDIL	Housing Development and Infrastructure Limited
NSE: HDFC	Housing Development Finance Corporation Limited
NSE: HOVS	HOV Services Limited
NSE: HPL	HPL Electric & Power Limited
NSE: HSIL	HSIL Limited
NSE: HTMEDIA	HT Media Limited
NSE: HUBTOWN	Hubtown Limited
NSE: PAPERPROD	Huhtamaki PPL Limited
NSE: HUSYSLTD	Husys Consulting Limited

== I ==
Symbol	Company name
NSE: ICEMAKE	Ice Make Refrigeration Limited
NSE: ICICIBANK	ICICI Bank Limited
NSE: ICICIGI	ICICI Lombard General Insurance Company Limited
NSE: ICICIPRULI	ICICI Prudential Life Insurance Company Limited
NSE: ISEC	ICICI Securities Limited
NSE: ICRA	ICRA Limited
NSE: IDBI	IDBI Bank Limited
NSE: IDFCFIRSTB	IDFC First Bank Limited
NSE: IDFC	IDFC Limited
NSE: IFBAGRO	IFB Agro Industries Limited
NSE: IFBIND	IFB Industries Limited
NSE: IFCI	IFCI Limited
NSE: IFGLEXPOR	IFGL Refractories Limited
NSE: IGPL	IG Petrochemicals Limited
NSE: IGARASHI	Igarashi Motors India Limited
NSE: IIFL	IIFL Finance Limited
NSE: IIFLSEC	IIFL Securities Limited
NSE: IIFLWAM	IIFL Wealth Management Limited
NSE: IL&FSENGG	IL&FS Engineering and Construction Company Limited
NSE: IVC	IL&FS Investment Managers Limited
NSE: IL&FSTRANS	IL&FS Transportation Networks Limited
NSE: INDLMETER	IMP Powers Limited
NSE: IMPEXFERRO	Impex Ferro Tech Limited
NSE: INDBANK	Indbank Merchant Banking Services Limited
NSE: INDIAGLYCO	India Glycols Limited
NSE: IMPAL	India Motor Parts and Accessories Limited
NSE: INDNIPPON	India Nippon Electricals Limited
NSE: ITDC	India Tourism Development Corporation Limited
NSE: IBULHSGFIN	Indiabulls Housing Finance Limited
NSE: IBULISL	Indiabulls Integrated Services Limited
NSE: IBREALEST	Indiabulls Real Estate Limited
NSE: IBVENTURES	Indiabulls Ventures Limited
NSE: INDIAMART	Indiamart Intermesh Limited
NSE: INDIANB	Indian Bank
NSE: INDIANCARD	Indian Card Clothing Company Limited
NSE: IEX	Indian Energy Exchange Limited
NSE: INDIANHUME	Indian Hume Pipe Company Limited
NSE: IMFA	Indian Metals & Ferro Alloys Limited
NSE: IOC	Indian Oil Corporation Limited
NSE: IOB	Indian Overseas Bank
NSE: IRCTC	Indian Railway Catering and Tourism Corporation Limited
NSE: INDTERRAIN	Indian Terrain Fashions Limited
NSE: ICIL	Indo Count Industries Limited
NSE: INDORAMA	Indo Rama Synthetics (India) Limited
NSE: INDOTECH	Indo Tech Transformers Limited
NSE: INDOTHAI	Indo Thai Securities Limited
NSE: INDOCO	Indoco Remedies Limited
NSE: NIPPOBATRY	Indo-National Limited
NSE: INDOSOLAR	Indosolar Limited
NSE: INDOSTAR	IndoStar Capital Finance Limited
NSE: INDOWIND	Indowind Energy Limited
NSE: IGL	Indraprastha Gas Limited
NSE: INDRAMEDCO	Indraprastha Medical Corporation Limited
NSE: INDSWFTLAB	Ind-Swift Laboratories Limited
NSE: INDSWFTLTD	Ind-Swift Limited
NSE: INDUSINDBK	IndusInd Bank Limited
NSE: IITL	Industrial Investment Trust Limited
NSE: INEOSSTYRO	INEOS Styrolution India Limited
NSE: INFIBEAM	Infibeam Avenues Limited
NSE: NAUKRI	Info Edge (India) Limited
NSE: INFOBEAN	InfoBeans Technologies Limited
NSE: INFOMEDIA	Infomedia Press Limited
NSE: INFY	Infosys Limited
NSE: INGERRAND	Ingersoll Rand (India) Limited
NSE: INNOVANA	Innovana Thinklabs Limited
NSE: INNOVATIVE	Innovative Tyres and Tubes Limited
NSE: INOXLEISUR	INOX Leisure Limited
NSE: INOXWIND	Inox Wind Limited
NSE: INSECTICID	Insecticides (India) Limited
NSE: INSPIRISYS	Inspirisys Solutions Limited
NSE: INTEGRA	Integra Garments and Textiles Limited
NSE: INTELLECT	Intellect Design Arena Limited
NSE: INTENTECH	Intense Technologies Limited
NSE: INDIGO	InterGlobe Aviation Limited
NSE: SUBCAPCITY	International Constructions Limited
NSE: ISFT	Intrasoft Technologies Limited
NSE: INVENTURE	Inventure Growth & Securities Limited
NSE: IOLCP	IOL Chemicals and Pharmaceuticals Limited
NSE: IPCALAB	IPCA Laboratories Limited
NSE: IRB	IRB Infrastructure Developers Limited
NSE: IRCON	Ircon International Limited
NSE: IRISDOREME	Iris Clothings Limited
NSE: ISMTLTD	ISMT Limited
NSE: ITC	ITC Limited
NSE: ITDCEM	ITD Cementation India Limited
NSE: ITI	ITI Limited
NSE: IVP	IVP Limited
NSE: IZMO	IZMO Limited

== J ==
Symbol	Company name
NSE: JKIL	J.Kumar Infraprojects Limited
NSE: JAGRAN	Jagran Prakashan Limited
NSE: JAGSNPHARM	Jagsonpal Pharmaceuticals Limited
NSE: JAIBALAJI	Jai Balaji Industries Limited
NSE: JAICORPLTD	Jai Corp Limited
NSE: JAIHINDPRO	Jaihind Projects Limited
NSE: JISLJALEQS	Jain Irrigation Systems Limited
NSE: JAINSTUDIO	Jain Studios Limited
NSE: JPASSOCIAT	Jaiprakash Associates Limited
NSE: JPPOWER	Jaiprakash Power Ventures Limited
NSE: JAKHARIA	Jakharia Fabric Limited
NSE: JALAN	Jalan Transolutions (India) Limited
NSE: JAMNAAUTO	Jamna Auto Industries Limited
NSE: JASH	Jash Engineering Limited
NSE: JAYBARMARU	Jay Bharat Maruti Limited
NSE: JAYAGROGN	Jayant Agro Organics Limited
NSE: JAYNECOIND	Jayaswal Neco Industries Limited
NSE: JPINFRATEC	Jaypee Infratech Limited
NSE: JAYSREETEA	Jayshree Tea & Industries Limited
NSE: JBCHEPHARM	JB Chemicals & Pharmaceuticals Limited
NSE: JBFIND	JBF Industries Limited
NSE: JBMA	JBM Auto Limited
NSE: JETAIRWAYS	Jet Airways (India) Limited
NSE: JETFREIGHT	Jet Freight Logistics Limited
NSE: JETKNIT	Jet Knitwears Limited
NSE: JHS	JHS Svendgaard Laboratories Limited
NSE: JIKIND	JIK Industries Limited
NSE: JINDRILL	Jindal Drilling And Industries Limited
NSE: JINDALPHOT	Jindal Photo Limited
NSE: JINDALPOLY	Jindal Poly Films Limited
NSE: JPOLYINVST	Jindal Poly Investment and Finance Company Limited
NSE: JINDALSAW	Jindal Saw Limited
NSE: JSLHISAR	Jindal Stainless (Hisar) Limited
NSE: JSL	Jindal Stainless Limited
NSE: JINDALSTEL	Jindal Steel & Power Limited
NSE: JINDWORLD	Jindal Worldwide Limited
NSE: JITFINFRA	JITF Infralogistics Limited
NSE: JKCEMENT	JK Cement Limited
NSE: JKLAKSHMI	JK Lakshmi Cement Limited
NSE: JKPAPER	JK Paper Limited
NSE: JKTYRE	JK Tyre & Industries Limited
NSE: JMFINANCIL	JM Financial Limited
NSE: JMCPROJECT	JMC Projects (India) Limited
NSE: JMTAUTOLTD	JMT Auto Limited
NSE: JOCIL	Jocil Limited
NSE: JCHAC	Johnson Controls – Hitachi Air Conditioning India Limited
NSE: JSWENERGY	JSW Energy Limited
NSE: JSWHL	JSW Holdings Limited
NSE: JSWSTEEL	JSW Steel Limited
NSE: JTEKTINDIA	Jtekt India Limited
NSE: JUBLFOOD	Jubilant Foodworks Limited
NSE: JUBLINDS	Jubilant Industries Limited
NSE: JUBILANT	Jubilant Life Sciences Limited
NSE: JMA	Jullundur Motor Agency (Delhi) Limited
NSE: JUSTDIAL	Just Dial Limited
NSE: JVLAGRO	JVL Agro Industries Limited
NSE: JYOTHYLAB	Jyothy Labs Limited
NSE: JYOTISTRUC	Jyoti Structures Limited

== K ==
Symbol	Company name
NSE: KMSUGAR	K.M.Sugar Mills Limited
NSE: KPRMILL	K.P.R. Mill Limited
NSE: KABRAEXTRU	Kabra Extrusion Technik Limited
NSE: KAJARIACER	Kajaria Ceramics Limited
NSE: KAKATCEM	Kakatiya Cement Sugar & Industries Limited
NSE: KALPATPOWR	Kalpataru Power Transmission Limited
NSE: KALYANI	Kalyani Commercials Limited
NSE: KALYANIFRG	Kalyani Forge Limited
NSE: KICL	Kalyani Investment Company Limited
NSE: KSL	Kalyani Steels Limited
NSE: KAMATHOTEL	Kamat Hotels (I) Limited
NSE: KAMDHENU	Kamdhenu Limited
NSE: KANANIIND	Kanani Industries Limited
NSE: KANORICHEM	Kanoria Chemicals & Industries Limited
NSE: KANSAINER	Kansai Nerolac Paints Limited
NSE: KAPSTON	Kapston Facilities Management Limited
NSE: KARDA	Karda Constructions Limited
NSE: KARMAENG	Karma Energy Limited
NSE: KARURVYSYA	Karur Vysya Bank Limited
NSE: KGL	Karuturi Global Limited
NSE: KAUSHALYA	Kaushalya Infrastructure Development Corporation Limited
NSE: KSCL	Kaveri Seed Company Limited
NSE: KAYA	Kaya Limited
NSE: KCP	KCP Limited
NSE: KCPSUGIND	KCP Sugar and Industries Corporation Limited
NSE: KDDL	KDDL Limited
NSE: KEC	KEC International Limited
NSE: KEERTI	Keerti Knowledge and Skills Limited
NSE: KEI	KEI Industries Limited
NSE: KELLTONTEC	Kellton Tech Solutions Limited
NSE: KERNEX	Kernex Microsystems (India) Limited
NSE: KESORAMIND	Kesoram Industries Limited
NSE: KKCL	Kewal Kiran Clothing Limited
NSE: KEYFINSERV	Keynote Financial Services Limited
NSE: KHADIM	Khadim India Limited
NSE: KHANDSE	Khandwala Securities Limited
NSE: KHFM	Khfm Hospitality And Facility Management Services Limited
NSE: KILITCH	Kilitch Drugs (India) Limited
NSE: KINGFA	Kingfa Science & Technology (India) Limited
NSE: KIOCL	KIOCL Limited
NSE: KIRIINDUS	Kiri Industries Limited
NSE: KIRLOSBROS	Kirloskar Brothers Limited
NSE: KECL	Kirloskar Electric Company Limited
NSE: KIRLOSIND	Kirloskar Industries Limited
NSE: KIRLOSENG	Kirloskar Oil Engines Limited
NSE: KITEX	Kitex Garments Limited
NSE: KKVAPOW	KKV Agro Powers Limited
NSE: KNRCON	KNR Constructions Limited
NSE: KOHINOOR	Kohinoor Foods Limited
NSE: KOKUYOCMLN	Kokuyo Camlin Limited
NSE: KOLTEPATIL	Kolte – Patil Developers Limited
NSE: KOPRAN	Kopran Limited
NSE: KOTAKBANK	Kotak Mahindra Bank Limited
NSE: KOTHARIPET	Kothari Petrochemicals Limited
NSE: KOTHARIPRO	Kothari Products Limited
NSE: KOTARISUG	Kothari Sugars And Chemicals Limited
NSE: KPITTECH	KPIT Technologies Limited
NSE: KRBL	KRBL Limited
NSE: KREBSBIO	Krebs Biochemicals and Industries Limited
NSE: KRIDHANINF	Kridhan Infra Limited
NSE: KRISHANA	Krishana Phoschem Limited
NSE: KRITIKA	Kritika Wires Limited
NSE: KSB	Ksb Limited
NSE: KSHITIJPOL	Kshitij Polyline Limited
NSE: KSK	KSK Energy Ventures Limited
NSE: KSERASERA	KSS Limited
NSE: KUANTUM	Kuantum Papers Limited
NSE: KWALITY	Kwality Limited

== L ==
Symbol	Company name
NSE: L&TFH	L&T Finance Holdings Limited
NSE: LTTS	L&T Technology Services Limited
NSE: LAOPALA	La Opala RG Limited
NSE: LAGNAM	Lagnam Spintex Limited
NSE: LFIC	Lakshmi Finance & Industrial Corporation Limited
NSE: LAXMIMACH	Lakshmi Machine Works Limited
NSE: LAKPRE	Lakshmi Precision Screws Limited
NSE: LAKSHVILAS	Lakshmi Vilas Bank Limited
NSE: LAMBODHARA	Lambodhara Textiles Limited
NSE: LPDC	Landmark Property Development Company Limited
NSE: LTI	Larsen & Toubro Infotech Limited
NSE: LT	Larsen & Toubro Limited
NSE: LASA	Lasa Supergenerics Limited
NSE: LATTEYS	Latteys Industries Limited
NSE: LAURUSLABS	Laurus Labs Limited
NSE: LAXMICOT	Laxmi Cotspin Limited
NSE: LEMONTREE	Lemon Tree Hotels Limited
NSE: LEXUS	Lexus Granito (India) Limited
NSE: LGBBROSLTD	LG Balakrishnan & Bros Limited
NSE: LGBFORGE	LGB Forge Limited
NSE: LIBAS	Libas Designs Limited
NSE: LIBERTSHOE	Liberty Shoes Limited
NSE: LICHSGFIN	LIC Housing Finance Limited
NSE: LIKHITHA	Likhitha Infrastructure Limited
NSE: LINCPEN	Linc Pen & Plastics Limited
NSE: LINCOLN	Lincoln Pharmaceuticals Limited
NSE: LINDEINDIA	Linde India Limited
NSE: LSIL	Lloyds Steels Industries Limited
NSE: LOKESHMACH	Lokesh Machines Limited
NSE: LOTUSEYE	Lotus Eye Hospital and Institute Limited
NSE: LOVABLE	Lovable Lingerie Limited
NSE: DAAWAT	LT Foods Limited
NSE: LUMAXTECH	Lumax Auto Technologies Limited
NSE: LUMAXIND	Lumax Industries Limited
NSE: LUPIN	Lupin Limited
NSE: LUXIND	Lux Industries Limited
NSE: LYKALABS	Lyka Labs Limited
NSE: LYPSAGEMS	Lypsa Gems & Jewellery Limited

== M ==
Symbol	Company name
NSE: MKPL	M K Proteins Limited
NSE: MRO	M.R. Organisation Limited
NSE: MAANALU	Maan Aluminium Limited
NSE: MACPOWER	Macpower CNC Machines Limited
NSE: MCL	Madhav Copper Limited
NSE: MADHAV	Madhav Marbles and Granites Limited
NSE: MADHUCON	Madhucon Projects Limited
NSE: MBAPL	Madhya Bharat Agro Products Limited
NSE: MPTODAY	Madhya Pradesh Today Media Limited
NSE: MADRASFERT	Madras Fertilizers Limited
NSE: MAGADSUGAR	Magadh Sugar & Energy Limited
NSE: MAGMA	Magma Fincorp Limited
NSE: MAGNUM	Magnum Ventures Limited
NSE: MAHAPEXLTD	Maha Rashtra Apex Corporation Limited
NSE: MAHASTEEL	Mahamaya Steel Industries Limited
NSE: MGL	Mahanagar Gas Limited
NSE: MTNL	Mahanagar Telephone Nigam Limited
NSE: MAHSCOOTER	Maharashtra Scooters Limited
NSE: MAHSEAMLES	Maharashtra Seamless Limited
NSE: MAHESHWARI	Maheshwari Logistics Limited
NSE: MAHICKRA	Mahickra Chemicals Limited
NSE: M&MFIN	Mahindra & Mahindra Financial Services Limited
NSE: M&M	Mahindra & Mahindra Limited
NSE: MAHINDCIE	Mahindra CIE Automotive Limited
NSE: MAHEPC	Mahindra EPC Irrigation Limited
NSE: MHRIL	Mahindra Holidays & Resorts India Limited
NSE: MAHLIFE	Mahindra Lifespace Developers Limited
NSE: MAHLOG	Mahindra Logistics Limited
NSE: MAITHANALL	Maithan Alloys Limited
NSE: MAJESCO	Majesco Limited
NSE: MALUPAPER	Malu Paper Mills Limited
NSE: MANINDS	Man Industries (India) Limited
NSE: MANINFRA	Man Infraconstruction Limited
NSE: MANAKALUCO	Manaksia Aluminium Company Limited
NSE: MANAKCOAT	Manaksia Coated Metals & Industries Limited
NSE: MANAKSIA	Manaksia Limited
NSE: MANAKSTEEL	Manaksia Steels Limited
NSE: MANALIPETC	Manali Petrochemicals Limited
NSE: MANAPPURAM	Manappuram Finance Limited
NSE: MANAV	Manav Infra Projects Limited
NSE: MANGLMCEM	Mangalam Cement Limited
NSE: MANGALAM	Mangalam Drugs And Organics Limited
NSE: MGEL	Mangalam Global Enterprise Limited
NSE: MANGTIMBER	Mangalam Timber Products Limited
NSE: MANGCHEFER	Mangalore Chemicals & Fertilizers Limited
NSE: MRPL	Mangalore Refinery and Petrochemicals Limited
NSE: MANUGRAPH	Manugraph India Limited
NSE: MARALOVER	Maral Overseas Limited
NSE: MARATHON	Marathon Nextgen Realty Limited
NSE: MARICO	Marico Limited
NSE: MARINE	Marine Electricals (India) Limited
NSE: MARKSANS	Marksans Pharma Limited
NSE: MARSHALL	Marshall Machines Limited
NSE: MARUTI	Maruti Suzuki India Limited
NSE: MDL	Marvel Decor Limited
NSE: MASFIN	MAS Financial Services Limited
NSE: MASKINVEST	Mask Investments Limited
NSE: MASTEK	Mastek Limited
NSE: MATRIMONY	Matrimony.com Limited
NSE: MAWANASUG	Mawana Sugars Limited
NSE: MFSL	Max Financial Services Limited
NSE: MAXHEALTH	Max Healthcare Institute Limited
NSE: MAXINDIA	Max India Limited
NSE: MAXVIL	Max Ventures and Industries Limited
NSE: MAYURUNIQ	Mayur Uniquoters Ltd
NSE: MAZDOCK	Mazagon Dock Shipbuilders Limited
NSE: MAZDA	Mazda Limited
NSE: MBLINFRA	MBL Infrastructures Limited
NSE: MCDHOLDING	McDowell Holdings Limited
NSE: MCLEODRUSS	Mcleod Russel India Limited
NSE: MBECL	Mcnally Bharat Engineering Company Limited
NSE: MEGASOFT	Megasoft Limited
NSE: MEGH	Meghmani Organics Limited
NSE: MELSTAR	Melstar Information Technologies Limited
NSE: MENONBE	Menon Bearings Limited
NSE: MEP	MEP Infrastructure Developers Limited
NSE: MERCATOR	Mercator Limited
NSE: METALFORGE	Metalyst Forgings Limited
NSE: METKORE	Metkore Alloys & Industries Limited
NSE: METROPOLIS	Metropolis Healthcare Limited
NSE: MIC	MIC Electronics Limited
NSE: MMNL	MIG Media Neurons Limited
NSE: MILTON	Milton Industries Limited
NSE: MINDACORP	Minda Corporation Limited
NSE: MINDAIND	Minda Industries Limited
NSE: MINDPOOL	Mindpool Technologies Limited
NSE: MINDTECK	Mindteck (India) Limited
NSE: MINDTREE	MindTree Limited
NSE: MIRCELECTR	MIRC Electronics Limited
NSE: MIRZAINT	Mirza International Limited
NSE: MIDHANI	Mishra Dhatu Nigam Limited
NSE: MITCON	MITCON Consultancy & Engineering Services Limited
NSE: MITTAL	Mittal Life Style Limited
NSE: MMFL	MM Forgings Limited
NSE: MMP	MMP Industries Limited
NSE: MMTC	MMTC Limited
NSE: MODIRUBBER	Modi Rubber Limited
NSE: MHHL	Mohini Health & Hygiene Limited
NSE: MOHITIND	Mohit Industries Limited
NSE: MOHOTAIND	Mohota Industries Limited
NSE: MOIL	MOIL Limited
NSE: MOKSH	Moksh Ornaments Limited
NSE: MOLDTKPAC	Mold-Tek Packaging Limited
NSE: MOLDTECH	Mold-Tek Technologies Limited
NSE: AIONJSW	Monnet Ispat & Energy Limited
NSE: MONTECARLO	Monte Carlo Fashions Limited
NSE: MORARJEE	Morarjee Textiles Limited
NSE: MOREPENLAB	Morepen Laboratories Limited
NSE: MOTHERSUMI	Motherson Sumi Systems Limited
NSE: MOTILALOFS	Motilal Oswal Financial Services Limited
NSE: MPHASIS	Mphasis
NSE: MPSLTD	MPS Limited
NSE: MRF	MRF Limited
NSE: MRO-TEK	MRO-TEK Realty Limited
NSE: MSPL	MSP Steel & Power Limited
NSE: MSTCLTD	MSTC Limited
NSE: MTEDUCARE	MT Educare Limited
NSE: MUKANDENGG	Mukand Engineers Limited
NSE: MUKANDLTD	Mukand Limited
NSE: MUKTAARTS	Mukta Arts Limited
NSE: MUNJALAU	Munjal Auto Industries Limited
NSE: MUNJALSHOW	Munjal Showa Limited
NSE: MURUDCERA	Murudeshwar Ceramics Limited
NSE: RADIOCITY	Music Broadcast Limited
NSE: MUTHOOTCAP	Muthoot Capital Services Limited
NSE: MUTHOOTFIN	Muthoot Finance Limited

== N ==
Symbol	Company name
NSE: NRAIL	N R Agarwal Industries Limited
NSE: NBIFIN	N. B. I. Industrial Finance Company Limited
NSE: NACLIND	NACL Industries Limited
NSE: NDGL	Naga Dhunseri Group Limited
NSE: NAGAFERT	Nagarjuna Fertilizers and Chemicals Limited
NSE: NAGREEKCAP	Nagreeka Capital & Infrastructure Limited
NSE: NAGREEKEXP	Nagreeka Exports Limited
NSE: NAHARCAP	Nahar Capital and Financial Services Limited
NSE: NAHARINDUS	Nahar Industrial Enterprises Limited
NSE: NAHARPOLY	Nahar Poly Films Limited
NSE: NAHARSPING	Nahar Spinning Mills Limited
NSE: NSIL	Nalwa Sons Investments Limited
NSE: NDL	Nandan Denim Limited
NSE: NANDANI	Nandani Creation Limited
NSE: NH	Narayana Hrudayalaya Ltd.
NSE: NARMADA	Narmada Agrobase Limited
NSE: NATCOPHARM	Natco Pharma Limited
NSE: NATHBIOGEN	Nath Bio-Genes (India) Limited
NSE: NATIONALUM	National Aluminium Company Limited
NSE: NFL	National Fertilizers Limited
NSE: NATNLSTEEL	National Steel And Agro Industries Limited
NSE: NBVENTURES	Nava Bharat Ventures Limited
NSE: NAVINFLUOR	Navin Fluorine International Limited
NSE: NAVKARCORP	Navkar Corporation Limited
NSE: NAVNETEDUL	Navneet Education Limited
NSE: NBCC	NBCC (India) Limited
NSE: NCC	NCC Limited
NSE: NCLIND	NCL Industries Limited
NSE: NECLIFE	Nectar Lifesciences Limited
NSE: NELCAST	Nelcast Limited
NSE: NELCO	NELCO Limited
NSE: NEOGEN	Neogen Chemicals Limited
NSE: NESCO	Nesco Limited
NSE: NETWORK18	Network18 Media & Investments Limited
NSE: NTL	Neueon Towers Limited
NSE: NEULANDLAB	Neuland Laboratories Limited
NSE: NDTV	New Delhi Television Limited
NSE: NEWGEN	Newgen Software Technologies Limited
NSE: NEXTMEDIA	Next Mediaworks Limited
NSE: NHPC	NHPC Limited
NSE: NIITLTD	NIIT Limited
NSE: NILAINFRA	Nila Infrastructures Limited
NSE: NILASPACES	Nila Spaces Limited
NSE: NILKAMAL	Nilkamal Limited
NSE: NAM-INDIA	Nippon Life India Asset Management Limited
NSE: NIRAJISPAT	Niraj Ispat Industries Limited
NSE: NITCO	Nitco Limited
NSE: NITINFIRE	Nitin Fire Protection Industries Limited
NSE: NITINSPIN	Nitin Spinners Limited
NSE: NITIRAJ	Nitiraj Engineers Limited
NSE: NKIND	NK Industries Limited
NSE: NLCINDIA	NLC India Limited
NSE: NMDC	NMDC Limited
NSE: NOCIL	NOCIL Limited
NSE: NOIDATOLL	Noida Toll Bridge Company Limited
NSE: NORBTEAEXP	Norben Tea & Exports Limited
NSE: NECCLTD	North Eastern Carrying Corporation Limited
NSE: NRBBEARING	NRB Bearing Limited
NSE: NIBL	NRB Industrial Bearings Limited
NSE: NTPC	NTPC Limited
NSE: NUCLEUS	Nucleus Software Exports Limited
NSE: NXTDIGITAL	NXTDigital Limited

== O ==
Symbol	Company name
NSE: OBEROIRLTY	Oberoi Realty Limited
NSE: OISL	OCL Iron and Steel Limited
NSE: ONGC	Oil & Natural Gas Corporation Limited
NSE: OILCOUNTUB	Oil Country Tubular Limited
NSE: OIL	Oil India Limited
NSE: OLECTRA	Olectra Greentech Limited
NSE: OMMETALS	OM Metals Infraprojects Limited
NSE: OMAXAUTO	Omax Autos Limited
NSE: OMAXE	Omaxe Limited
NSE: OMFURN	Omfurn India Limited
NSE: OMKARCHEM	Omkar Speciality Chemicals Limited
NSE: ONEPOINT	One Point One Solutions Limited
NSE: ONELIFECAP	Onelife Capital Advisors Limited
NSE: ONMOBILE	OnMobile Global Limited
NSE: ONWARDTEC	Onward Technologies Limited
NSE: OPAL	Opal Luxury Time Products Limited
NSE: OPTIEMUS	Optiemus Infracom Limited
NSE: OPTOCIRCUI	Opto Circuits (India) Limited
NSE: OFSS	Oracle Financial Services Software Limited
NSE: ORBTEXP	Orbit Exports Limited
NSE: ORCHIDPHAR	Orchid Pharma Limited
NSE: ORICONENT	Oricon Enterprises Limited
NSE: ORIENTABRA	Orient Abrasives Limited
NSE: ORIENTBELL	Orient Bell Limited
NSE: ORIENTCEM	Orient Cement Limited
NSE: ORIENTELEC	Orient Electric Limited
NSE: GREENPOWER	Orient Green Power Company Limited
NSE: ORIENTPPR	Orient Paper & Industries Limited
NSE: ORIENTLTD	Orient Press Limited
NSE: ORIENTREF	Orient Refractories Limited
NSE: OAL	Oriental Aromatics Limited
NSE: OCCL	Oriental Carbon & Chemicals Limited
NSE: ORIENTHOT	Oriental Hotels Limited
NSE: ORIENTALTL	Oriental Trimex Limited
NSE: ORTEL	Ortel Communications Limited
NSE: ORTINLABSS	Ortin Laboratories Limited
NSE: OSIAHYPER	Osia Hyper Retail Limited
NSE: OSWALAGRO	Oswal Agro Mills Limited
NSE: BINDALAGRO	Oswal Chemicals & Fertilizers Limited

== P ==
Symbol	Company name
NSE: PAEL	PAE Limited
NSE: PAGEIND	Page Industries Limited
NSE: PAISALO	Paisalo Digital Limited
NSE: PALASHSECU	Palash Securities Limited
NSE: PALREDTEC	Palred Technologies Limited
NSE: PANACEABIO	Panacea Biotec Limited
NSE: PANACHE	Panache Digilife Limited
NSE: PANAMAPET	Panama Petrochem Limited
NSE: PANSARI	Pansari Developers Limited
NSE: PAR	Par Drugs and Chemicals Limited
NSE: PARABDRUGS	Parabolic Drugs Limited
NSE: PARAGMILK	Parag Milk Foods Limited
NSE: PARACABLES	Paramount Communications Limited
NSE: PARIN	Parin Furniture Limited
NSE: PARSVNATH	Parsvnath Developers Limited
NSE: PASHUPATI	Pashupati Cotspin Limited
NSE: PATELENG	Patel Engineering Limited
NSE: PATINTLOG	Patel Integrated Logistics Limited
NSE: PATSPINLTD	Patspin India Limited
NSE: PCJEWELLER	PC Jeweller Limited
NSE: PDSMFL	PDS Multinational Fashions Limited
NSE: PGIL	Pearl Global Industries Limited
NSE: PEARLPOLY	Pearl Polymers Limited
NSE: PENINLAND	Peninsula Land Limited
NSE: PENIND	Pennar Industries Limited
NSE: PENTAGOLD	Penta Gold Limited
NSE: PERFECT	Perfect Infraengineers Limited
NSE: PERSISTENT	Persistent Systems Limited
NSE: PETRONET	Petronet LNG Limited
NSE: PFIZER	Pfizer Limited
NSE: PGEL	PG Electroplast Limited
NSE: PHILIPCARB	Phillips Carbon Black Limited
NSE: PIIND	PI Industries Limited
NSE: PIDILITIND	Pidilite Industries Limited
NSE: PILITA	Pil Italica Lifestyle Limited
NSE: PILANIINVS	Pilani Investment and Industries Corporation Limited
NSE: PIONDIST	Pioneer Distilleries Limited
NSE: PIONEEREMB	Pioneer Embroideries Limited
NSE: PEL	Piramal Enterprises Limited
NSE: PITTIENG	Pitti Engineering Limited
NSE: PLASTIBLEN	Plastiblends India Limited
NSE: PNBGILTS	PNB Gilts Limited
NSE: PNBHOUSING	PNB Housing Finance Limited
NSE: PNCINFRA	PNC Infratech Limited
NSE: PODDARHOUS	Poddar Housing and Development Limited
NSE: PODDARMENT	Poddar Pigments Limited
NSE: POKARNA	Pokarna Limited
NSE: POLYMED	Poly Medicure Limited
NSE: POLYCAB	Polycab India Limited
NSE: POLYPLEX	Polyplex Corporation Limited
NSE: PONNIERODE	Ponni Sugars (Erode) Limited
NSE: PIGL	Power & Instrumentation (Gujarat) Limited
NSE: PFC	Power Finance Corporation Limited
NSE: POWERGRID	Power Grid Corporation of India Limited
NSE: POWERMECH	Power Mech Projects Limited
NSE: POWERFUL	Powerful Technologies Limited
NSE: PPAP	PPAP Automotive Limited
NSE: PRABHAT	Prabhat Dairy Limited
NSE: PRADIP	Pradip Overseas Limited
NSE: PRAJIND	Praj Industries Limited
NSE: PRAENG	Prajay Engineers Syndicate Limited
NSE: PRAKASH	Prakash Industries Limited
NSE: PPL	Prakash Pipes Limited
NSE: PRAKASHSTL	Prakash Steelage Limited
NSE: DIAMONDYD	Prataap Snacks Limited
NSE: PRAXIS	Praxis Home Retail Limited
NSE: PRECAM	Precision Camshafts Limited
NSE: PRECWIRE	Precision Wires India Limited
NSE: PRECOT	Precot Meridian Limited
NSE: PREMEXPLN	Premier Explosives Limited
NSE: PREMIER	Premier Limited
NSE: PREMIERPOL	Premier Polyfilm Limited
NSE: PRESSMN	Pressman Advertising Limited
NSE: PRESTIGE	Prestige Estates Projects Limited
NSE: PRICOLLTD	Pricol Limited
NSE: PFOCUS	Prime Focus Limited
NSE: PRIMESECU	Prime Securities Limited
NSE: PRIZOR	Prizor Viztech Limited
NSE: PRINCEPIPE	Prince Pipes And Fittings Limited
NSE: PRSMJOHNSN	Prism Johnson Limited
NSE: PRITI	Priti International Limited
NSE: PNC	Pritish Nandy Communications Limited
NSE: PGHL	Procter & Gamble Health Limited
NSE: PGHH	Procter & Gamble Hygiene and Health Care Limited
NSE: PROLIFE	Prolife Industries Limited
NSE: PROSEED	Proseed India Limited
NSE: PROZONINTU	Prozone Intu Properties Limited
NSE: PSL	PSL Limited
NSE: PSPPROJECT	PSP Projects Limited
NSE: PFS	PTC India Financial Services Limited
NSE: PTC	PTC India Limited
NSE: PTL	PTL Enterprises Limited
NSE: PDMJEPAPER	Pudumjee Paper Products Limited
NSE: PULZ	Pulz Electronics Limited
NSE: PUNJLLOYD	Punj Lloyd Limited
NSE: PSB	Punjab & Sind Bank
NSE: PUNJABCHEM	Punjab Chemicals & Crop Protection Limited
NSE: PNB	Punjab National Bank
NSE: PURVA	Puravankara Limited
NSE: PUSHPREALM	Pushpanjali Realms and Infratech Limited
NSE: PVR	PVR Limited

== Q ==
Symbol	Company name
NSE: QUESS	Quess Corp Limited
NSE: QUICKHEAL	Quick Heal Technologies Limited

== R ==
Symbol	Company name
NSE: RMDRIP	R M Drip and Sprinklers Systems Limited
NSE: RSYSTEMS	R Systems International Limited
NSE: RSSOFTWARE	R. S. Software (India) Limited
NSE: RPPINFRA	R.P.P. Infra Projects Limited
NSE: RADAAN	Radaan Mediaworks India Limited
NSE: RMCL	Radha Madhav Corporation Limited
NSE: RAJPUTANA	Rajputana Biodiesel Ltd
NSE: RADICO	Radico Khaitan Limited
NSE: RVNL	Rail Vikas Nigam Limited
NSE: RAIN	Rain Industries Limited
NSE: RAJOIL	Raj Oil Mills Limited
NSE: RAJRAYON	Raj Rayon Industries Limited
NSE: RAJTV	Raj Television Network Limited
NSE: ARENTERP	Rajdarshan Industries Limited
NSE: RAJESHEXPO	Rajesh Exports Limited
NSE: RAJMET	Rajnandini Metal Limited
NSE: RPPL	Rajshree Polypack Limited
NSE: RAJSREESUG	Rajshree Sugars & Chemicals Limited
NSE: RALLIS	Rallis India Limited
NSE: RAMASTEEL	Rama Steel Tubes Limited
NSE: RAMCOIND	Ramco Industries Limited
NSE: RAMCOSYS	Ramco Systems Limited
NSE: RKFORGE	Ramkrishna Forgings Limited
NSE: RAMKY	Ramky Infrastructure Limited
NSE: RAMSARUP	Ramsarup Industries Limited
NSE: RANASUG	Rana Sugars Limited
NSE: RML	Rane (Madras) Limited
NSE: RBL	Rane Brake Lining Limited
NSE: RANEENGINE	Rane Engine Valve Limited
NSE: RANEHOLDIN	Rane Holdings Limited
NSE: RCF	Rashtriya Chemicals and Fertilizers Limited
NSE: RATNAMANI	Ratnamani Metals & Tubes Limited
NSE: RTNINFRA	RattanIndia Infrastructure Limited
NSE: RTNPOWER	RattanIndia Power Limited
NSE: RKDL	Ravi Kumar Distilleries Limited
NSE: RAYMOND	Raymond Limited
NSE: RBLBANK	RBL Bank Limited
NSE: RECLTD	REC Limited
NSE: REDINGTON	Redington (India) Limited
NSE: REFEX	Refex Industries Limited
NSE: RELAXO	Relaxo Footwears Limited
NSE: RELIABLE	Reliable Data Services Limited
NSE: RELCAPITAL	Reliance Capital Limited
NSE: RCOM	Reliance Communications Limited
NSE: RHFL	Reliance Home Finance Limited
NSE: RIIL	Reliance Industrial Infrastructure Limited
NSE: RELIANCE	Reliance Industries Limited
NSE: RELINFRA	Reliance Infrastructure Limited
NSE: RPOWER	Reliance Power Limited
NSE: RELIGARE	Religare Enterprises Limited
NSE: REMSONSIND	Remsons Industries Limited
NSE: RGL	Renaissance Global Limited
NSE: REPCOHOME	Repco Home Finance Limited
NSE: REPRO	Repro India Limited
NSE: RESPONIND	Responsive Industries Limited
NSE: REVATHI	Revathi Equipment Limited
NSE: RICOAUTO	Rico Auto Industries Limited
NSE: RITES	RITES Limited
NSE: RKEC	RKEC Projects Limited
NSE: ROHITFERRO	Rohit Ferro-Tech Limited
NSE: ROLLT	Rollatainers Limited
NSE: ROLTA	Rolta India Limited
NSE: ROSSARI	Rossari Biotech Limited
NSE: ROSSELLIND	Rossell India Limited
NSE: ROUTE	Route Mobile Limited
NSE: ROHLTD	Royal Orchid Hotels Limited
NSE: RPGLIFE	RPG Life Sciences Limited
NSE: RSWM	RSWM Limited
NSE: RUCHINFRA	Ruchi Infrastructure Limited
NSE: RUCHI	Ruchi Soya Industries Limited
NSE: RUCHIRA	Ruchira Papers Limited
NSE: REPL	Rudrabhishek Enterprises Limited
NSE: RUPA	Rupa & Company Limited
NSE: RUSHIL	Rushil Decor Limited

== S ==
Symbol	Company name
NSE: SCHAND	S Chand And Company Limited
NSE: SHK	S H Kelkar and Company Limited
NSE: S&SPOWER	S&S Power Switchgears Limited
NSE: SPAL	S. P. Apparels Limited
NSE: SALSTEEL	S.A.L. Steel Limited
NSE: SEPOWER	S.E. Power Limited
NSE: SSINFRA	S.S. Infrastructure Development Consultants Limited
NSE: SABEVENTS	Sab Events & Governance Now Media Limited
NSE: SADBHAV	Sadbhav Engineering Limited
NSE: SADBHIN	Sadbhav Infrastructure Project Limited
NSE: SAFARI	Safari Industries (India) Limited
NSE: SAGCEM	Sagar Cements Limited
NSE: SAGARDEEP	Sagardeep Alloys Limited
NSE: SAKAR	Sakar Healthcare Limited
NSE: SAKETH	Saketh Exim Limited
NSE: SAKSOFT	Saksoft Limited
NSE: SAKHTISUG	Sakthi Sugars Limited
NSE: SAKUMA	Sakuma Exports Limited
NSE: SECL	Salasar Exteriors and Contour Limited
NSE: SALASAR	Salasar Techno Engineering Limited
NSE: SALONA	Salona Cotspin Limited
NSE: SALZERELEC	Salzer Electronics Limited
NSE: SAMBHAAV	Sambhaav Media Limited
NSE: SANCO	Sanco Industries Limited
NSE: SANDHAR	Sandhar Technologies Limited
NSE: SANGAMIND	Sangam (India) Limited
NSE: SANGHIIND	Sanghi Industries Limited
NSE: SANGHVIFOR	Sanghvi Forging and Engineering Limited
NSE: SANGHVIMOV	Sanghvi Movers Limited
NSE: SANGINITA	Sanginita Chemicals Limited
NSE: SANOFI	Sanofi India Limited
NSE: SANWARIA	Sanwaria Consumer Limited
NSE: SARDAEN	Sarda Energy & Minerals Limited
NSE: SAREGAMA	Saregama India Limited
NSE: SARLAPOLY	Sarla Performance Fibers Limited
NSE: SARVESHWAR	Sarveshwar Foods Limited
NSE: SASKEN	Sasken Technologies Limited
NSE: SASTASUNDR	Sastasundar Ventures Limited
NSE: SATHAISPAT	Sathavahana Ispat Limited
NSE: SATIA	Satia Industries Limited
NSE: SATIN	Satin Creditcare Network Limited
NSE: SOTL	Savita Oil Technologies Limited
NSE: SBICARD	SBI Cards and Payment Services Limited
NSE: SBILIFE	SBI Life Insurance Company Limited
NSE: SCHAEFFLER	Schaeffler India Limited
NSE: SCHNEIDER	Schneider Electric Infrastructure Limited
NSE: SEAMECLTD	Seamec Limited
NSE: SECURCRED	SecUR Credentials Limited
NSE: SIS	Security and Intelligence Services (India) Limited
NSE: SELMCL	SEL Manufacturing Company Limited
NSE: SELAN	Selan Exploration Technology Limited
NSE: SEQUENT	Sequent Scientific Limited
NSE: SERVOTECH	Servotech Power Systems Limited
NSE: SESHAPAPER	Seshasayee Paper and Boards Limited
NSE: SETCO	Setco Automotive Limited
NSE: SETUINFRA	Setubandhan Infrastructure Limited
NSE: SEYAIND	Seya Industries Limited
NSE: SEJAL	Sejal Glass Limited
NSE: SHAHALLOYS	Shah Alloys Limited
NSE: SHAIVAL	Shaival Reality Limited
NSE: SHAKTIPUMP	Shakti Pumps (India) Limited
NSE: SHALBY	Shalby Limited
NSE: SHALPAINTS	Shalimar Paints Limited
NSE: SHANKARA	Shankara Building Products Limited
NSE: SHANTIGEAR	Shanthi Gears Limited
NSE: SHANTI	Shanti Overseas (India) Limited
NSE: SHARDACROP	Sharda Cropchem Limited
NSE: SHARDAMOTR	Sharda Motor Industries Limited
NSE: SHARONBIO	Sharon Bio-Medicine Limited
NSE: SFL	Sheela Foam Limited
NSE: SPYL	Shekhawati Poly-Yarn Limited
NSE: SHEMAROO	Shemaroo Entertainment Limited
NSE: SHILPAMED	Shilpa Medicare Limited
NSE: SCI	Shipping Corporation of India Limited
NSE: SHIRPUR-G	Shirpur Gold Refinery Limited
NSE: SHIVAUM	Shiv Aum Steels Limited
NSE: SHIVAMILLS	Shiva Mills Limited
NSE: SHIVATEX	Shiva Texyarn Limited
NSE: SHIVAMAUTO	Shivam Autotech Limited
NSE: SHOPERSTOP	Shoppers Stop Limited
NSE: SHRADHA	Shradha Infraprojects Limited
NSE: SHREECEM	Shree Cement Limited
NSE: SHREDIGCEM	Shree Digvijay Cement Co.Ltd
NSE: SHREEPUSHK	Shree Pushkar Chemicals & Fertilisers Limited
NSE: SRPL	Shree Ram Proteins Limited
NSE: SHREERAMA	Shree Rama Multi-Tech Limited
NSE: RAMANEWS	Shree Rama Newsprint Limited
NSE: RENUKA	Shree Renuka Sugars Limited
NSE: TIRUPATI	Shree Tirupati Balajee FIBC Limited
NSE: SVLL	Shree Vasu Logistics Limited
NSE: OSWALSEEDS	ShreeOswal Seeds And Chemicals Limited
NSE: SHRENIK	Shrenik Limited
NSE: SHREYANIND	Shreyans Industries Limited
NSE: SHREYAS	Shreyas Shipping & Logistics Limited
NSE: SRIRAM	Shri Ram Switchgears Limited
NSE: SHRIRAMCIT	Shriram City Union Finance Limited
NSE: SHRIRAMEPC	Shriram EPC Limited
NSE: SHRIPISTON	Shriram Pistons & Rings Limited
NSE: SRTRANSFIN	Shriram Transport Finance Company Limited
NSE: SHUBHLAXMI	Shubhlaxmi Jewel Art Limited
NSE: SHYAMCENT	Shyam Century Ferrous Limited
NSE: SHYAMMETL	Shyam Metalics and Energy Ltd
NSE: SHYAMTEL	Shyam Telecom Limited
NSE: SICAGEN	Sicagen India Limited
NSE: SICAL	Sical Logistics Limited
NSE: SIEMENS	Siemens Limited
NSE: SIGIND	Signet Industries Limited
NSE: SIKKO	Sikko Industries Limited
NSE: SILINV	SIL Investments Limited
NSE: SILGO	Silgo Retail Limited
NSE: SILLYMONKS	Silly Monks Entertainment Limited
NSE: SILVERTUC	Silver Touch Technologies Limited
NSE: SIMBHALS	Simbhaoli Sugars Limited
NSE: SIMPLEXINF	Simplex Infrastructures Limited
NSE: SINTERCOM	Sintercom India Limited
NSE: SINTEX	Sintex Industries Limited
NSE: SPTL	Sintex Plastics Technology Limited
NSE: SIRCA	Sirca Paints India Limited
NSE: SITINET	Siti Networks Limited
NSE: SIYSIL	Siyaram Silk Mills Limited
NSE: SJVN	SJVN Limited
NSE: SKFINDIA	SKF India Limited
NSE: SKIL	SKIL Infrastructure Limited
NSE: SKIPPER	Skipper Limited
NSE: SKMEGGPROD	SKM Egg Products Export (India) Limited
NSE: SKSTEXTILE	SKS Textiles Limited
NSE: SMARTLINK	Smartlink Holdings Limited
NSE: SMLISUZU	SML Isuzu Limited
NSE: SMSLIFE	SMS Lifesciences India Limited
NSE: SMSPHARMA	SMS Pharmaceuticals Limited
NSE: SMVD	SMVD Poly Pack Limited
NSE: SNOWMAN	Snowman Logistics Limited
NSE: SOBHA	Sobha Limited
NSE: SOFTTECH	Softtech Engineers Limited
NSE: SOLARINDS	Solar Industries India Limited
NSE: SOLARA	Solara Active Pharma Sciences Limited
NSE: SOLEX	Solex Energy Limited
NSE: SDBL	Som Distilleries & Breweries Limited
NSE: SOMATEX	Soma Textiles & Industries Limited
NSE: SOMANYCERA	Somany Ceramics Limited
NSE: SHIL	Somany Home Innovation Limited
NSE: SOMICONVEY	Somi Conveyor Beltings Limited
NSE: SONAHISONA	Sona Hi Sona Jewellers (Gujarat) Limited
NSE: SONAMCLOCK	Sonam Clock Limited
NSE: SONATSOFTW	Sonata Software Limited
NSE: SONISOYA	Soni Soya Products Limited
NSE: SORILINFRA	SORIL Infra Resources Limited
NSE: SOUTHWEST	South West Pinnacle Exploration Limited
NSE: SPIC	Southern Petrochemicals Industries Corporation Limited
NSE: SPCENET	Spacenet Enterprises India Limited
NSE: SPANDANA	Spandana Sphoorty Financial Limited
NSE: SPECIALITY	Speciality Restaurants Limited
NSE: SPECTRUM	Spectrum Electrical Industries Limited
NSE: SPENCERS	Spencer's Retail Limited
NSE: SPENTEX	Spentex Industries Limited
NSE: SPLIL	SPL Industries Limited
NSE: SMPL	Splendid Metal Products Limited
NSE: SPMLINFRA	SPML Infra Limited
NSE: SRHHYPOLTD	Sree Rayalaseema Hi-Strength Hypo Limited
NSE: SREEL	Sreeleathers Limited
NSE: SREINFRA	SREI Infrastructure Finance Limited
NSE: SRF	SRF Limited
NSE: SABTN	Sri Adhikari Brothers Television Network Limited
NSE: HAVISHA	Sri Havisha Hospitality and Infrastructure Limited
NSE: SRIPIPES	Srikalahasthi Pipes Limited
NSE: STAMPEDE	Stampede Capital Limited
NSE: SIL	Standard Industries Limited
NSE: STARCEMENT	Star Cement Limited
NSE: STARPAPER	Star Paper Mills Limited
NSE: SBIN	State Bank of India
NSE: SAIL	Steel Authority of India Limited
NSE: STEELCITY	Steel City Securities Limited
NSE: STEELXIND	Steel Exchange India Limited
NSE: SSWL	Steel Strips Wheels Limited
NSE: STEL	Stel Holdings Limited
NSE: SWSOLAR	Sterling And Wilson Solar Limited
NSE: STERTOOLS	Sterling Tools Limited
NSE: STRTECH	Sterlite Technologies Limited
NSE: STINDIA	STI India Limited
NSE: SGL	STL Global Limited
NSE: STAR	Strides Pharma Science Limited
NSE: SUBEXLTD	Subex Limited
NSE: SUBROS	Subros Limited
NSE: SUDARSCHEM	Sudarshan Chemical Industries Limited
NSE: SUJANAUNI	Sujana Universal Industries Limited
NSE: SUMEETINDS	Sumeet Industries Limited
NSE: SUMIT	Sumit Woods Limited
NSE: SUMICHEM	Sumitomo Chemical India Limited
NSE: SUMMITSEC	Summit Securities Limited
NSE: SPARC	Sun Pharma Advanced Research Company Limited
NSE: SUNPHARMA	Sun Pharmaceutical Industries Limited
NSE: SUNTV	Sun TV Network Limited
NSE: SUNDRMBRAK	Sundaram Brake Linings Limited
NSE: SUNCLAYLTD	Sundaram Clayton Limited
NSE: SUNDARMHLD	Sundaram Finance Holdings Limited
NSE: SUNDARMFIN	Sundaram Finance Limited
NSE: SUNDARAM	Sundaram Multi Pap Limited
NSE: SUNDRMFAST	Sundram Fasteners Limited
NSE: SUNFLAG	Sunflag Iron And Steel Company Limited
NSE: SUPERSPIN	Super Spinning Mills Limited
NSE: SUPERHOUSE	Superhouse Limited
NSE: SUPRAJIT	Suprajit Engineering Limited
NSE: SUPREMEENG	Supreme Engineering Limited
NSE: SUPREMEIND	Supreme Industries Limited
NSE: SUPREMEINF	Supreme Infrastructure India Limited
NSE: SUPPETRO	Supreme Petrochem Limited
NSE: SURANASOL	Surana Solar Limited
NSE: SURANAT&P	Surana Telecom and Power Limited
NSE: SURANI	Surani Steel Tubes Limited
NSE: SUREVIN	Surevin BPO Services Limited
NSE: SURYAROSNI	Surya Roshni Limited
NSE: SURYALAXMI	Suryalakshmi Cotton Mills Limited
NSE: SUTLEJTEX	Sutlej Textiles and Industries Limited
NSE: SUULD	Suumaya Lifestyle Limited
NSE: SUVEN	Suven Life Sciences Limited
NSE: SUVENPHAR	Suven Pharmaceuticals Limited
NSE: SUZLON	Suzlon Energy Limited
NSE: SWANDEF	Swan Defence and Heavy Industries Limited
NSE: SWANENERGY	Swan Energy Limited
NSE: SWARAJENG	Swaraj Engines Limited
NSE: SWELECTES	Swelect Energy Systems Limited
NSE: SYMPHONY	Symphony Limited
NSE: SYNCOM	Syncom Healthcare Limited
NSE: SYNGENE	Syngene International Limited

== T ==
Symbol	Company name
NSE: TTL	T T Limited
NSE: TAINWALCHM	Tainwala Chemical and Plastic (I) Limited
NSE: TAJGVK	Taj GVK Hotels & Resorts Limited
NSE: TAKE	Take Solutions Limited
NSE: TALBROAUTO	Talbros Automotive Components Limited
NSE: TALWALKARS	Talwalkars Better Value Fitness Limited
NSE: TALWGYM	Talwalkars Healthclubs Limited
NSE: TNPL	Tamil Nadu Newsprint & Papers Limited
NSE: TNPETRO	Tamil Nadu Petroproducts Limited
NSE: TNTELE	Tamil Nadu Telecommunication Limited
NSE: TANLA	Tanla Solutions Limited
NSE: TANTIACONS	Tantia Constructions Limited
NSE: TARACHAND	Tara Chand Logistic Solutions Limited
NSE: TARMAT	Tarmat Limited
NSE: TASTYBITE	Tasty Bite Eatables Limited
NSE: TATACHEM	Tata Chemicals Limited
NSE: TATACOFFEE	Tata Coffee Limited
NSE: TATACOMM	Tata Communications Limited
NSE: TCS	Tata Consultancy Services Limited
NSE: TATACONSUM	Tata Consumer Products Limited
NSE: TATAELXSI	Tata Elxsi Limited
NSE: TATAINVEST	Tata Investment Corporation Limited
NSE: TATAMETALI	Tata Metaliks Limited
NSE: TATAMOTORS	Tata Motors Limited
NSE: TATAPOWER	Tata Power Company Limited
NSE: TATASTLBSL	Tata Steel Bsl Limited
NSE: TATASTEEL	Tata Steel Limited
NSE: TATASTLLP	Tata Steel Long Products Limited
NSE: TTML	Tata Teleservices (Maharashtra) Limited
NSE: TCIDEVELOP	TCI Developers Limited
NSE: TCIEXP	TCI Express Limited
NSE: TCIFINANCE	TCI Finance Limited
NSE: TCNSBRANDS	TCNS Clothing Co. Limited
NSE: TCPLPACK	TCPL Packaging Limited
NSE: TDPOWERSYS	TD Power Systems Limited
NSE: TEAMLEASE	Teamlease Services Limited
NSE: TECHM	Tech Mahindra Limited
NSE: TECHIN	Techindia Nirman Limited
NSE: TECHNOE	Techno Electric & Engineering Company Limited
NSE: TIIL	Technocraft Industries (India) Limited
NSE: TECHNOFAB	Technofab Engineering Limited
NSE: TEJASNET	Tejas Networks Limited
NSE: TERASOFT	Tera Software Limited
NSE: TEXINFRA	Texmaco Infrastructure & Holdings Limited
NSE: TEXRAIL	Texmaco Rail & Engineering Limited
NSE: TEXMOPIPES	Texmo Pipes and Products Limited
NSE: TGBHOTELS	TGB Banquets And Hotels Limited
NSE: THANGAMAYL	Thangamayil Jewellery Limited
NSE: ANDHRSUGAR	The Andhra Sugars Limited
NSE: ANUP	The Anup Engineering Limited
NSE: BYKE	The Byke Hospitality Ltd
NSE: FEDERALBNK	The Federal Bank Limited
NSE: GESHIP	The Great Eastern Shipping Company Limited
NSE: GROBTEA	The Grob Tea Company Limited
NSE: HITECHGEAR	The Hi-Tech Gears Limited
NSE: INDIACEM	The India Cements Limited
NSE: INDHOTEL	The Indian Hotels Company Limited
NSE: THEINVEST	The Investment Trust Of India Limited
NSE: J&KBANK	The Jammu & Kashmir Bank Limited
NSE: KTKBANK	The Karnataka Bank Limited
NSE: TMRVL	The Mandhana Retail Ventures Limited
NSE: MOTOGENFIN	The Motor & General Finance Limited
NSE: NIACL	The New India Assurance Company Limited
NSE: ORISSAMINE	The Orissa Minerals Development Company Limited
NSE: PKTEA	The Peria Karamalai Tea & Produce Company Limited
NSE: PHOENIXLTD	The Phoenix Mills Limited
NSE: RAMCOCEM	The Ramco Cements Limited
NSE: RUBYMILLS	The Ruby Mills Limited
NSE: SANDESH	The Sandesh Limited
NSE: SOUTHBANK	The South Indian Bank Limited
NSE: STCINDIA	The State Trading Corporation of India Limited
NSE: TINPLATE	The Tinplate Company of India Limited
NSE: UGARSUGAR	The Ugar Sugar Works Limited
NSE: UNITEDTEA	The United Nilgiri Tea Estates Company Limited
NSE: WIPL	The Western India Plywoods Limited
NSE: THEJO	Thejo Engineering Limited
NSE: THEMISMED	Themis Medicare Limited
NSE: THERMAX	Thermax Limited
NSE: THIRUSUGAR	Thiru Arooran Sugars Limited
NSE: TIRUMALCHM	Thirumalai Chemicals Limited
NSE: THOMASCOOK	Thomas Cook (India) Limited
NSE: THOMASCOTT	Thomas Scott (India) Limited
NSE: THYROCARE	Thyrocare Technologies Limited
NSE: TIDEWATER	Tide Water Oil Company (India) Limited
NSE: TIJARIA	Tijaria Polypipes Limited
NSE: TIL	TIL Limited
NSE: TI	Tilaknagar Industries Limited
NSE: TIMETECHNO	Time Technoplast Limited
NSE: TIMESGTY	Times Guaranty Limited
NSE: TIMKEN	Timken India Limited
NSE: TIPSINDLTD	TIPS Industries Limited
NSE: TIRUPATIFL	Tirupati Forge Limited
NSE: TWL	Titagarh Wagons Limited
NSE: TITAN	Titan Company Limited
NSE: TOKYOPLAST	Tokyo Plast International Limited
NSE: TORNTPHARM	Torrent Pharmaceuticals Limited
NSE: TORNTPOWER	Torrent Power Limited
NSE: TOTAL	Total Transport Systems Limited
NSE: TOUCHWOOD	Touchwood Entertainment Limited
NSE: TFCILTD	Tourism Finance Corporation of India Limited
NSE: TPLPLASTEH	TPL Plastech Limited
NSE: TRIL	Transformers And Rectifiers (India) Limited
NSE: TCI	Transport Corporation of India Limited
NSE: TFL	Transwarranty Finance Limited
NSE: TRANSWIND	Transwind Infrastructures Limited
NSE: TREEHOUSE	Tree House Education & Accessories Limited
NSE: TREJHARA	Trejhara Solutions Limited
NSE: TRENT	Trent Limited
NSE: TRF	TRF Limited
NSE: TBZ	Tribhovandas Bhimji Zaveri Limited
NSE: TRIDENT	Trident Limited
NSE: TRIGYN	Trigyn Technologies Limited
NSE: TRIVENI	Triveni Engineering & Industries Limited
NSE: TRITURBINE	Triveni Turbine Limited
NSE: TTKHLTCARE	TTK Healthcare Limited
NSE: TTKPRESTIG	TTK Prestige Limited
NSE: TIINDIA	Tube Investments of India Limited
NSE: TVTODAY	TV Today Network Limited
NSE: TVVISION	TV Vision Limited
NSE: TV18BRDCST	TV18 Broadcast Limited
NSE: TVSELECT	TVS Electronics Limited
NSE: TVSMOTOR	TVS Motor Company Limited
NSE: TVSSRICHAK	TVS Srichakra Limited

== U ==
Symbol	Company name
NSE: UCALFUEL	Ucal Fuel Systems Limited
NSE: UCOBANK	UCO Bank
NSE: UFLEX	UFLEX Limited
NSE: UFO	UFO Moviez India Limited
NSE: UGROCAP	UGRO Capital Limited
NSE: UJAAS	Ujaas Energy Limited
NSE: UJJIVAN	Ujjivan Financial Services Limited
NSE: UJJIVANSFB	Ujjivan Small Finance Bank Limited
NSE: UWCSL	Ultra Wiring Connectivity System Limited
NSE: ULTRACEMCO	UltraTech Cement Limited
NSE: UMANGDAIRY	Umang Dairies Limited
NSE: UNICHEMLAB	Unichem Laboratories Limited
NSE: UNIINFO	Uniinfo Telecom Services Limited
NSE: UNIONBANK	Union Bank of India
NSE: UNIENTER	Uniphos Enterprises Limited
NSE: UNIPLY	Uniply Industries Limited
NSE: UNITECH	Unitech Limited
NSE: UBL	United Breweries Limited
NSE: UNITEDPOLY	United Polyfab Gujarat Limited
NSE: MCDOWELL-N	United Spirits Limited
NSE: UNITY	Unity Infraprojects Limited
NSE: UNIVASTU	Univastu India Limited
NSE: UNIVCABLES	Universal Cables Limited
NSE: UNIVPHOTO	Universus Photo Imagings Limited
NSE: UPL	UPL Limited
NSE: URAVI	Uravi T and Wedge Lamps Limited
NSE: URJA	Urja Global Limited
NSE: UMESLTD	Usha Martin Education & Solutions Limited
NSE: USHAMART	Usha Martin Limited
NSE: UCL	Ushanti Colour Chem Limited
NSE: UTIAMC	UTI Asset Management Company Limited
NSE: UTTAMSTL	Uttam Galva Steels Limited
NSE: UTTAMSUGAR	Uttam Sugar Mills Limited
NSE: UVSL	Uttam Value Steels Limited

== V ==
Symbol	Company name
NSE: VSTTILLERS	Shukla industries Pvt LTD
NSE: V2RETAIL	V2 Retail Limited
NSE: WABAG	VA Tech Wabag Limited
NSE: VADILALIND	Vadilal Industries Limited
NSE: VSCL	Vadivarhe Speciality Chemicals Limited
NSE: VAIBHAVGBL	Vaibhav Global Limited
NSE: VAISHALI	Vaishali Pharma Limited
NSE: VAKRANGEE	Vakrangee Limited
NSE: VARDHACRLC	Vardhman Acrylics Limited
NSE: VHL	Vardhman Holdings Limited
NSE: VARDMNPOLY	Vardhman Polytex Limited
NSE: VSSL	Vardhman Special Steels Limited
NSE: VTL	Vardhman Textiles Limited
NSE: VARROC	Varroc Engineering Limited
NSE: VBL	Varun Beverages Limited
NSE: VASA	Vasa Retail and Overseas Ltd
NSE: VASCONEQ	Vascon Engineers Limited
NSE: VASWANI	Vaswani Industries Limited
NSE: VCL	Vaxtex Cotfab Limited
NSE: VEDL	Vedanta Limited
NSE: VENKEYS	Venky's (India) Limited
NSE: VENUSREM	Venus Remedies Limited
NSE: VERA	Vera Synthetic Limited
NSE: VERTOZ	Vertoz Advertising Limited
NSE: VESUVIUS	Vesuvius India Limited
NSE: VETO	Veto Switchgears And Cables Limited
NSE: VGUARD	V-Guard Industries Limited
NSE: VICEROY	Viceroy Hotels Limited
NSE: VIDEOIND	Videocon Industries Limited
NSE: VIDHIING	Vidhi Specialty Food Ingredients Limited
NSE: VIJIFIN	Viji Finance Limited
NSE: VIKASECO	Vikas EcoTech Limited
NSE: VIKASMCORP	Vikas Multicorp Limited
NSE: VIMTALABS	Vimta Labs Limited
NSE: VINATIORGA	Vinati Organics Limited
NSE: VINDHYATEL	Vindhya Telelinks Limited
NSE: VINNY	Vinny Overseas Limited
NSE: VINYLINDIA	Vinyl Chemicals (India) Limited
NSE: VIPCLOTHNG	VIP Clothing Limited
NSE: VIPIND	VIP Industries Limited
NSE: VIPULLTD	Vipul Limited
NSE: VISASTEEL	Visa Steel Limited
NSE: VIVIDHA	Visagar Polytex Limited
NSE: VISAKAIND	Visaka Industries Limited
NSE: VISHNU	Vishnu Chemicals Limited
NSE: VISHWARAJ	Vishwaraj Sugar Industries Limited
NSE: VIVIMEDLAB	Vivimed Labs Limited
NSE: VLSFINANCE	VLS Finance Limited
NSE: VMART	V-Mart Retail Limited
NSE: IDEA	Vodafone Idea Limited
NSE: VOLTAMP	Voltamp Transformers Limited
NSE: VOLTAS	Voltas Limited
NSE: VRLLOG	VRL Logistics Limited
NSE: VSTIND	VST Industries Limited

== W ==
Symbol	Company name
NSE: WSI	W S Industries (I) Limited
NSE: WABCOINDIA	WABCO India Limited
NSE: WALCHANNAG	Walchandnagar Industries Limited
NSE: WANBURY	Wanbury Limited
NSE: WEALTH	Wealth First Portfolio Managers Limited
NSE: WEBELSOLAR	Websol Energy System Limited
NSE: WEIZMANIND	Weizmann Limited
NSE: WELCORP	Welspun Corp Limited
NSE: WELENT	Welspun Enterprises Limited
NSE: WELSPUNIND	Welspun India Limited
NSE: WELINV	Welspun Investments and Commercials Limited
NSE: WENDT	Wendt (India) Limited
NSE: WSTCSTPAPR	West Coast Paper Mills Limited
NSE: WHEELS	Wheels India Limited
NSE: WHIRLPOOL	Whirlpool of India Limited
NSE: WILLAMAGOR	Williamson Magor & Company Limited
NSE: WINDMACHIN	Windsor Machines Limited
NSE: WIPRO	Wipro Limited
NSE: WOCKPHARMA	Wockhardt Limited
NSE: WFL	Wonder Fibromats Limited
NSE: WONDERLA	Wonderla Holidays Limited
NSE: WORTH	Worth Peripherals Limited

== X ==
Symbol	Company name
NSE: XCHANGING	Xchanging Solutions Limited
NSE: XELPMOC	Xelpmoc Design And Tech Limited
NSE: XPROINDIA	Xpro India Limited

== Y ==
Symbol	Company name
NSE: YESBANK	Yes Bank Limited

== Z ==
Symbol	Company name
NSE: ZEEL	Zee Entertainment Enterprises Limited
NSE: ZEELEARN	Zee Learn Limited
NSE: ZEEMEDIA	Zee Media Corporation Limited
NSE: ZENTEC	Zen Technologies Limited
NSE: ZENITHBIR	Zenith Birla (India) Limited
NSE: ZENITHEXPO	Zenith Exports Limited
NSE: ZENSARTECH	Zensar Technologies Limited
NSE: ZICOM	Zicom Electronic Security Systems Limited
NSE: ZODIACLOTH	Zodiac Clothing Company Limited
NSE: ZODIAC	Zodiac Energy Limited
NSE: ZODJRDMKJ	Zodiac JRD- MKJ Limited
NSE: ZOTA	Zota Health Care Limited
NSE: ZUARI	Zuari Agro Chemicals Limited
NSE: ZUARIGLOB	Zuari Global Limited
NSE: ZYDUSWELL	Zydus Wellness Limited
NSE: ZAGGLE	ZAGGLE Zaggle

== Companies with good fundamental ==
- NIFTY 50
