= Kwality Ltd. =

Indian dairy company

- Type: Private
- Industry: Food and Agro Processing
- Founded: 1992
- Headquarters: New Delhi, India
- Area served: Gujarat, Bihar, Jharkhand, Orissa, Karnataka, Andhra Pradesh
- Products: Dairy Products Tetra Pak
- Website: www.kwality.com

Kwality Ltd. is a processor and handler of dairy products in India listed on Bombay Stock exchange as public Limited Company. The company produces various types of dairy products, which include milk, ghee, butter, milk powder, curd, yogurt, cheese etc. The company has established procurement network which comprise 350,000 farmer families across 4,700 villages in North India. Kwality Ltd. has six plants in Haryana, Uttar Pradesh and Rajasthan with processing capacity of 3.4 million liters (750,000 imp gal; 900,000 U.S. gal) milk per day.

== History ==
Kwality Ltd. was incorporated in 1992 as Kwality Dairy (India) Ltd and registered with the registrar of companies (West Bengal) at Calcutta. In 1995 the company started producing ghee, skimmed milk powder and other dairy products. The total cost of the above project was ₹3600 crore by way of public issue.

In 2013, Kwality Dairy India Ltd was changed from Kwality Dairy (India) Limited to Kwality Limited.

In Dun & Bradstreet Corporate Award 2014, Kwality Limited was selected as the top Indian Company under the ‘Food & Agro processing’ sector.

In June 2016, Kwality Ltd. secured the investment of ₹520 crore from KKR India.

In October 2019, Haldiram made a ₹130 crore bid for Kwality Dairy (India) Ltd after private equity giant KKR & Co. dragged dairy firm to bankruptcy court.

On 21 September 2020, Kwality Limited was charged with cheating a group of banks of ₹1,400 crore in a case of fraud filed by the Central Bureau of Investigation. The CBI started its investigations on a complaint by Bank of India, which alleged that Kwality Ltd had taken credit from the bank since 2010 but started defaulting on payments in early 2018.

== Brands and subsidiaries ==
The company sells milk under the brand Kwality Milk, which is available in three variants: Full Cream, Toned & Double Toned. It also sells ready to drink Flavoured Milk, Dahi, Chaach etc. It is the first company in India to launch fortified flavoured milk with vitamin A+D in multiple flavours like Kesar, Badam, Elaichi, Butterscotch and Cold Coffee.

== Products ==
The product range of the company includes skimmed milk powder, whole milk powder, dairy whitener, dairy mix, ice cream mix, ready to drink milk, and ghee among other products.

== Advertising ==
The company had signed up the actor Akshay Kumar as a brand ambassador in October 2015 for two years, according to a BSE filing.

In September 2017, the company confirmed the reappointment of Akshay Kumar as its brand ambassador for another two years. Kwality Limited came out with a campaign for its brand of milk, ‘Kwality’. The TVC campaign was conceptualized by McCann Health, India and it featured Akshay Kumar.
