= Navneet Education =

Indian book company

Navneet Education Limited
- Company type: Public
- Traded as: BSE: 508989; NSE: NAVNETEDUL
- Industry: Publishing stationery
- Founded: 1950
- Headquarters: Mumbai, Maharashtra, India
- Key people: Mr. Kamlesh S. Vikamsey (chairman); Mr. Gnanesh D. Gala (MD)
- Products: Books and stationery
- Revenue: ₹9,311 million (US$97 million) (2016)
- Number of employees: 2500
- Website: www.navneet.com

Navneet Education Limited (BSE: 508989) is an Indian company that is in the business of educational and children book publishing, scholastic stationery and non-paper stationery products.

Navneet operates in three segments: publication, stationery and others. Its products are Navneet, Vikas, Gala, YOUVA. It produces titles in the children and general book categories, which includes children activity, board, story, health, cooking, mehendi, and embroidery books. It has more than 5000 titles in English, Hindi, Marathi, Gujarati and other languages.

== Corporate information ==
It was founded in 1959, in Mumbai. In 1993, it became a public company and listed its shares on Bombay Stock Exchange and National Stock Exchange. Presently, the chairman is Kamlesh S. Vikamsey and the managing director is Gnanesh D. Gala. The joint managing director is Mr. Raju H. Gala. The chief financial officer is Deepak Kaku and the company secretary is Amit Buch. It has its registered office at Dadar, Mumbai, Maharashtra.

In 2016, Navneet acquired Britannica India's curriculum business for ₹ 88 crore.
