= Orient Bell =

Indian tile manufacturer

Orient Bell Limited
- Company type: Public
- Traded as: NSE: ORIENTBELL, BSE: 530365
- Industry: Tiles, building materials
- Founded: 18 May 1977
- Headquarters: New Delhi, India
- Key people: Mahendra K. Daga (Chairman & Whole Time Director); Madhur Daga (Managing Director)
- Revenue: ▲₹669.7 crore (FY 2025)

Orient Bell Limited (NSE: ORIENTBELL) is an Indian manufacturer of vitrified and ceramic tiles, with its registered office in New Delhi. Established on 18 May 1977, the company operates three manufacturing facilities in Uttar Pradesh, Karnataka, and Dora, Gujarat, with an annual production capacity of approximately 42.4 million square meters. It is publicly traded on both the Bombay Stock Exchange and National Stock Exchange.

== History ==
Orient Bell Limited was originally incorporated on 18 May 1977, as Orient Ceramics and Industries. Initially, the company manufactured glazed tiles at its facility in Uttar Pradesh.

In December 2010, Orient Ceramics acquired Bell Ceramics through a stock swap arrangement. Following the acquisition, the merged entity was renamed Orient Bell Limited, and shareholding arrangements were managed through the Orient Bell Trust. In May 2017, the stake held in the trust was sold, with proceeds allocated toward expanding manufacturing capacity and other operational activities.

== Operations ==
Orient Bell operates manufacturing plants in Sikandrabad (Uttar Pradesh), Hoskote (Karnataka), and Dora (Gujarat), producing vitrified and ceramic tiles. The total production capacity, including outputs from third-party joint ventures, is around 42.4 MSM per year. The company's product range includes vitrified, digital, ceramic tiles marketed under the brand Orientbell tiles. The products are distributed throughout India via a network of authorized channel partners and retailers.

== Ranking ==
- A Rated by CRISIL in 2023
