= Dairy mix =

A dairy mix is the blend of milk, cream, sugar, stabilizers, and vanilla packaged by a dairy for commercial use. This mix can either be made directly into ice cream or placed into containers for the use in soft serve, frozen custard, or ice cream machines. Dairy mix used in restaurants can be also used to make frozen drinks or smoothies.

Producers of dairy mix range from large scale dairies, down to independent dairy companies looking to provide a niche product. The ease of purchasing these products from dairy companies have helped spread frozen custard to nearly all parts of the country. In the Midwest, frozen custard is a household name. Ted Drewes spread the popularity of frozen custard around from St. Louis to Kansas City and beyond. There are schools designed especially to teach pupils how to run their frozen dessert businesses.

Dairy mix is typically packaged in 2.5-US-gallon (9.5 L) bags, 1-US-gallon (3.8 L) jugs or half gallon cartons. Most dairies place these in milk crates or boxes, depending on where or how they ship their product. These products are pasteurized under State and Federal guidelines.
