= Transformers and Rectifiers (India) Ltd =

Transformers and Rectifiers (India) Ltd.
- Type: Public Ltd. Co.
- Traded as: NSE: TARIL, BSE: 532928
- Industry: Energy
- Founded: 1981
- Founder: Mr. Jitendra Mamtora
- Headquarters: Ahmedabad, Gujarat, India
- Area served: Worldwide
- Key people: Satyen Mamtora (MD & CEO),
- Products: Power Transformers; Distribution transformer; Furnace Transformers; Rectifier transformers
- Revenue: ▲₹736.76 crore (US$79 million) (FY 2025-26)
- Net income: ▲₹272.2 crore (US$29 million) (FY 2025-26)
- Total assets: ▲₹2,670 crore (US$290 million) (FY 2025-26)
- Number of employees: 2500+
- Website: www.transformerindia.com

Transformers and Rectifiers (India) Ltd. (TARIL) is an Indian power tech company and manufacturer of Transformers, headquartered in Ahmedabad, Gujarat.

TARIL is publicly traded on both the Bombay Stock Exchange (BSE) and the National Stock Exchange (NSE) under the ticker symbol TARIL.

== History ==
TARIL was established in the year 1981 by Mr. Jitendra Mamtora. The company was incorporated in 1994 as Triveni Electric Company. In 1995, the Company's name was changed to Transformers and Rectifiers (India) Limited.

Mr. Satyen J. Mamtora, who is a graduate from Uxbridge College, London, and an alumnus of the General Management Program at Harvard University had joined the company as Managing Director & CEO in 1997.

In the year 2007, Transformers and Rectifiers launched its IPO and as listed on Bombay Stock Exchange and National Stock Exchange.

TARIL has played an important role in India’s clean energy transition by supplying reliable solutions to solar parks, wind farms, and other renewable energy projects.

== Operations ==
With more than 18,000 installations worldwide TARIL operates three State of the art manufacturing facilities at Changodar, Moraiya, and Odhav near Ahmedabad, Gujarat.

The company has with a total installed manufacturing capacity of 75,000+ MVA per annum supporting the production of transformers up to 1,000 MVA, 1,200 kV class.

== International expansion ==
The Company has its presence in more than 40 countries including Asia, Africa, Europe, North America, South America, and Australia.

== Read more ==
- Transformers and Rectifiers India Ltd. - Research Report
- Transformers and Rectifiers (India) Ltd: When Cyclical Recovery Masks Deeper Risks
