= NRB Bearing =

Indian bearings manufacturing company

NRB Bearings Ltd.
- Type: Public
- Traded as: BSE: 530367; NSE: NRBBEARING
- Industry: Roller bearings
- Area served: Worldwide
- Products: Bearing
- Revenue: ca. INR 848cr
- Number of employees: ca.3000
- Divisions: NRB Thailand, NRB GMBH Europe

NRB Bearing is an Indian multinational manufacturer of needle and roller bearings based in Mumbai, Maharashtra, India. It was established in June 1965 as an Indo-French joint venture between Trilochan Singh Sahney and Nadella S.A. of France under the name of Needle Roller Bearing Co.

== History ==
=== Founding (1965) ===
The company was founded in June 1965 in Mumbai as Needle Roller Bearing Company Limited, an Indo-French joint venture between Trilochan Singh Sahney and Nadella S.A., a French bearings manufacturer, it was established to make needle roller bearings in India. According to company history sources, NRB Bearings was the first company to manufacture needle roller bearings in India and their first manufacturing plant was established in 1966 in Thane, Maharashtra.

=== Expansion (1975–1995) ===
In 1975, a larger manufacturing plant was established at Thane. In 1980, a facility was set up in Aurangabad for the production of needle rollers and an division was established for the distribution of bearings and related products from overseas manufacturers. In 1982, the company started a plant in Jalna, Maharashtra, to manufacture cylindrical, ball, spherical and tapered roller bearings. In 1990, the company changed its name to NRB Bearings Limited. In April 1991, the company was merged with Sahney Steel and Press Works and a manufacturing plant was established at Waluj, Maharashtra. and in 1995, it began manufacturing tapered roller bearings under a collaboration agreement with SNR Roulements of France.

=== Acquisitions and corporate changes (2000–2012) ===
In February 2000, NRB Bearings bought a 45.78 percent stake in Shriram Needle Industries. In the same year, an engineering and design center was established at the Thane manufacturing unit. In October 2002, The Timken Company bought the Engineered Solutions Business of Ingersoll Rand, this also includeds Nadella S.A.'s equity stake in NRB Bearings. The partnership with Nadella ended in 2005. In 2012, NRB Bearings split its industrial bearings business into NRB Industrial Bearings Limited, which was listed as an entity.

=== Passing of founder (2018) ===
Trilochan Singh Sahney, founder and non-executive chairman of NRB Bearings, died on 16 October 2018.

=== Recent developments (2025) ===
In 2025, NRB Bearings established Mahant Tool Room Private Limited as a wholly owned subsidiary. The subsidiary later completed the acquisition of the Mahant Tool Room business in 2026.

== Products ==
NRB Bearings manufactures bearing products and related components for automotive and industrial applications.

- Needle roller bearings
- Cylindrical roller bearings
- Tapered roller bearings
- Drawn cup bearings
- Special ball bearings
- Thrust bearings
- Planetary shafts and pins

== Manufacturing ==
NRB Bearings has manufacturing plants in India and Thailand. Its facilities in India include Aurangabad, Waluj and Jalna in Maharashtra, along with plants in Hyderabad and Pantnagar.

Its engineering and design centre is located at Turbhe in Navi Mumbai. The centre is used for testing and validating bearing designs. NRB Bearings reports that its facilities hold ISO 9001, IATF 16949, ISO 14001 and ISO 45001 certifications, along with compliance with REACH and ELV requirements.

== Subsidiaries ==
NRB Bearings' subsidiaries include:

- SNL Bearings Limited
- NRB Holding Limited
- NRB Bearings (Thailand) Limited
- NRB Bearings Europe GmbH
- NRB Bearings USA Inc.

== Financial performance ==
NRB Bearings is listed on the Bombay Stock Exchange

- BSE: 530367 and the National Stock Exchange of India NSE: NRBBEARING

.In FY2025, the company reported revenue from operations of ₹1,198.61 crore.

== Leadership ==
=== Founder ===
Trilochan Singh Sahney founded NRB Bearings in 1965. He served in leadership roles within the company, including as non-executive chairman, until his death in October 2018.

=== Current management ===
Harshbeena Zaveri serves as Vice Chairperson and Managing Director of NRB Bearings.

Other members of the company's leadership include:

- Tashwinder Singh - Independent Chairman
- Satish Rangani - Non-Executive Director
- Vineet Goel - Chief Finance Officer
- Alok Vatsa - Chief Human Resources Officer
- Dr. Saravanan Muthiah - Chief Technical Officer

== Corporate social responsibility ==
NRB Bearings reports corporate social responsibility initiatives in education, skills development, and community welfare programmes. The company has reported support for institutions and non-governmental organisations, including Ashoka University and the Gyan Prakash Foundation.
