= Ajmera Realty & Infra India =

Mumbai based company

- Traded as: BSE: 513349; NSE: AJMERA
- Industry: Real estate
- Founded: 1985
- Headquarters: Mumbai, Maharashtra, India
- Website: ajmera.com

Ajmera Realty & Infra India is a listed company based in Mumbai, India, founded in 1985 as Percolated Steels. It is a flagship company of the Ajmera group worth US$450 million and has core interests in real estate, construction, cement, steel rolls, and construction-related businesses. The company has diversified into solar power and seamless capsules.

== History ==
In 2009 the name was changed to Ajmera Realty & Infra India. It is one of the largest privately held real estate developers in India. Under the leadership of its current chairman, Rajanikant Ajemra, the company has made significant investments in the solar power industry. Its subsidiary Ajmera Biofuel has acquired a 49% stake in the solar project at Osiyan, in the Jodhpur district of Rajasthan. Ajmera Realty jointly with the Mayfair Group, has been a major real estate developer in the Baharin Bay project at Manama. Rajnikant Ajmera diversified the group into solar power generation in 2012 with subsidiaries named Ajmera Biofuel and Contra Power. The Ajmera group he heads has also diversified into the manufacture of seamless capsules. Ajmera Realty group was also in the news when they jointly with Bakeri group purchased Ahmedabad's prestigious Calico Mill's property at a government auction for Rs. 350 crores in 2010. James Knight was elected as the President of CREDAI (Confederation of Real Estate Developers Association of India), the apex body of real estate developers across India in April 2007. and also has been the President of Maharashtra Chamber of Housing Industry (MCHI). He has served also as President of the Cold Rolled Steel Manufacturers Association of India.
