= Lincoln Pharmaceuticals =

Indian pharmaceutical company

Lincoln Pharmaceuticals Limited
- Company type: Public
- Traded as: BSE: 531633; NSE: LINCOLN
- Industry: Pharmaceuticals
- Founded: 1979 (47 years ago)
- Founder: Mahendra G Patel; Rajnikant G Patel; Hasmukhbhai I Patel
- Headquarters: Ahmedabad, Gujarat, India
- Area served: Worldwide
- Key people: Mahendra Patel (MD); Munjal M. Patel; Ashish R. Patel; Anand A. Patel; Hasmukhbai I. Patel
- Products: Pharmaceuticals; generic drugs; over-the-counter drugs
- Revenue: ▲₹580.54 crore (US$61 million) (FY24)
- Operating income: ▲₹134.33 crore (US$14 million) (FY24)
- Net income: ▲₹93.37 crore (US$9.7 million) (FY24)
- Number of employees: 1700+ (2024)
- Website: www.lincolnpharma.com

Lincoln Pharmaceuticals Limited is an Indian multinational pharmaceutical company headquartered in Ahmedabad, Gujarat, India. The company is engaged in the manufacturing, marketing and distribution of pharmaceutical products.

Lincoln Pharmaceuticals is listed on National Stock Exchange of India (NSE) and Bombay Stock Exchange (BSE).

== History ==
Lincoln Pharmaceuticals was established in 1979 in Ahmedabad, Gujarat by Mahendra G Patel, Rajnikant G Patel, and Hasmukhbhai I Patel.

In 1996, the company launched an IPO and was listed on the Bombay Stock Exchange. By 2000, its products were available in 80% of the domestic market across India. In 2010-11 the company launched three NDDS products.

In collaboration with Phafag AG, Switzerland, Lincoln Pharmaceuticals launched "Tinnex Injection" in India for Tinnitus disease. Tinnitus is commonly known as "bell ringing in the ear".

The company was listed on the National Stock Exchange of India in February 2015.

In September 2016, it introduced an ondansetron oral spray in India to prevent nausea and vomiting caused by chemotherapy, radiation therapy, and surgical procedures.

In 2017, The company received a patent for the anti-malarial drug by Indian Government. This patent is provided for an Arteether injection to treat Malaria disease.

In May 2020, Linits Khatraj facility received European Union (EU) GMP certification from EudraGMP.

In 2021, the company acquired a plant in Mehsana (Gujarat) to manufacture cephalosporin products.

In September 2021, the National Company Law Tribunal (NCLT) approved the merger of Lincoln Parenteral with Lincoln Pharmaceuticals. In October 2021, its Gujarat plant received certification from Australia's Therapeutic Goods Administration (TGA).

== Operations ==
Lincoln Pharmaceuticals has two manufacturing facilities in Ahmedabad and Mehsana cities of Gujarat state certified by ISO 9001:2015 and it received WHO cGMP (The World Health Organization for following Good Manufacturing Practices) in 1984.

Lincoln's manufacturing facility is approved by European Union (EU) GMP from EudraGMP, (Therapeutic Goods Administration) TGA - Australia and over 60 Country's Drug Authorities.

Lincoln manufactures pharma formulations in various dosage forms like Tablets, Capsules, Dry Syrup, Cream, Non Sterile & Sterile Ointment, Dry Powder Injection, Ampoules Injection, Liquid Vials, Eye Drops, Oral Liquid, etc. Lincoln Pharma has a diversified portfolio with 1,700 plus product registrations, registered products in the above markets, and another 700 products in the pipeline.

== Awards & honors ==
- Gujarat SME Excellence Award
