= Aurionpro =

Indian software company

- Type: Public
- Traded as: NSE: AURIONPRO; BSE: 532668
- Industry: IT and IT product company
- Founded: October 1997
- Headquarters: Navi Mumbai, India
- Area served: Worldwide
- Website: www.aurionpro.com

Aurionpro Solutions Limited is a technology company, headquartered in Navi Mumbai, India. It primarily serves the banking, mobility, payments, and government sectors. Aurionpro is a publicly listed company, traded on the Bombay Stock Exchange (BSE) and National Stock Exchange of India (NSE), with a market capitalization exceeding Rs 76 billion as of 15th May 2025.

== History ==
Aurionpro was incorporated on 31 October 1997 as Value Added Information Distribution Services Private Limited. It later changed its name to VAIDS Technologies Private Limited on 30 April 2001 and subsequently to Aurionpro Solutions Private Limited on 18 September 2003. As of March 2023, Aurionpro has 24 offices in 22 countries, with over 2000 employees.

The company is led by Paresh Zaveri, the chairman and managing director. In July 2022, Ashish Rai became the vice chairman and president of Aurionpro, while Sanjay Bali heads the Tech Innovation Group, and Shekhar Mullatti is in charge of the banking division.

== Subsidiaries ==
In 2020, Aurionpro acquired a majority stake of 51% in SC Soft, a Singapore-based IT company that develops software for transportation fare collections.

Integro, an IT company, is a subsidiary of Aurionpro.

== Partnerships with state governments ==
- In January 2023, Aurionpro Payments Singapore launched a payment gateway platform called 'AuropayBiz,' to enable businesses to receive digital payments and formed partnerships with 'Stripe Payments' and 'FIS Worldpay.'
- On February 21, 2023, Aurionpro's subsidiary, Integro Technologies, partnered with Finastra.
- On April 28, 2021, SC Soft Pte. Limited, a subsidiary of Aurionpro, and MasterCard signed a strategic alliance for automatic fare collection and payment solutions.
- On June 24, 2022, Aurionpro engaged with the Government of Rajasthan to expand the latter's 3D City platform in Jaipur.
- On November 29, 2022, Aurionpro implemented the National Common Mobility Card (NCMC) based open loop ticketing system and GPS system at all depots/sub-depots of Haryana Roadways, a state government undertaking.

== Awards ==
- Aurionpro was recognized as a Great Place To Work for two consecutive years.
- Its subsidiary, Integro Technologies, was named as a global category leader in Credit Lending Operations by Chartis, a research and analysis organization for Risk Technologies.
- Received the India Technology Excellence Award in the Digital– Technology category at the Asian Technology Excellence Awards 2022.
