= Reliance Industrial Infrastructure =

Indian company

Reliance Industrial Infrastructure Ltd.
- Type: Public
- Traded as: BSE: 523445; NSE: RIIL
- Founded: 19 September 1988; 37 years ago
- Headquarters: Mumbai, Maharashtra, India
- Parent: Reliance Industries (45.43%)
- Website: riil.in

Reliance Industrial Infrastructure Limited, formerly Chembur Patalganga Pipelines Limited, is an industrial infrastructure company based in Mumbai, India. It is a part of Reliance Industries. It also leases equipment and offers IT consulting services.
