= Opto Circuits =

Opto Circuits Limited
- Traded as: BSE: 532391; NSE: OPTOCIRCUI
- Founded: 1992; 34 years ago
- Headquarters: Bangalore, India
- Key people: Vinod Ramnani, Chairman and Managing Director
- Products: Medical devices
- Revenue: ₹10.77 billion (US$110 million) (2010)
- Operating income: ₹3.56 billion (US$37 million)
- Net income: ₹2.6 billion (US$27 million)
- Number of employees: Over 1800
- Subsidiaries: Advanced Micronic Devices Ltd., Criticare Systems Inc., Devon Innovations Pvt Ltd., Eurocor Gmbh, Maxcor Lifescience Inc., Mediaid Inc., N.S. Remedies Pvt. Ltd., Opto Cardiac Care Ltd., Opto Circuits (Malaysia) SDN BHD, Opto Eurocor Healthcare Ltd., Opto Infrastructure Ltd., Ormed Medical Technology Ltd., Unetixs Vascular Inc.
- Website: http://www.optoindia.com

Opto Circuits (India) Limited (OCI) is a vertically integrated multinational medical technology Group that specializes in primary, acute and critical care products for the global markets. Group companies such as Criticare, Eurocor, Mediaid, AMDL and Unetixs Vascular are leaders in cardiac and vital signs monitors, emergency cardiac care equipment, vascular treatments and sensing technologies. The Company's USFDA listed and CE marked products are marketed in more than 150 countries and sold through direct and indirect sales channels across many emerging and developing economies.

== History ==
Opto Circuits Limited was established in 1991 in Bangalore. It went public in 2000, with a listing on the Bombay Stock Exchange and the National Stock Exchange.

The company was listed in Asia's Best under a Billion list by Forbes magazine in 2011.

== Products ==
Opto Circuits specializes in cardiac and vital signs monitoring, emergency cardiac care, vascular treatments and sensing technologies.
