= Vivimed Labs =

Indian pharmaceutical company

Vivimed Labs Limited
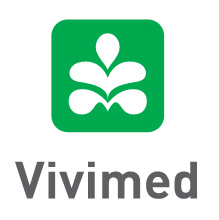
- Type: Public Limited Company
- Traded as: NSE: VIVIMEDLAB; BSE: 532660
- ISIN: INE526G01013
- Industry: Chemicals, Manufacturing
- Founded: 1988
- Headquarters: Hyderabad, India
- Key people: Dr. V. Manohar Rao(Chairman) Santosh Varalwar (CEO), Dr. Richard Smith (COO), Sandeep Varalwar(Executive Director)
- Products: Active Ingredients, APIs, Hair-Dyes, Photochromics
- Revenue: INR 9,524.66 million (2019)
- Operating income: ▲INR 4344.69 million (2019)
- Net income: ▲INR 2040.11 million (2019)
- Number of employees: 3000+ (2019)
- Website: www.vivimedlabs.com

Vivimed Labs Limited is an India-based global supplier of specialty chemicals and pharmaceuticals. Headquartered in Hyderabad, India. Vivimed is a manufacturer of active pharmaceutical ingredients, active ingredients for home and personal care, hair dyes, imaging chemicals and photochromics.

== History ==
Vivimed was originally incorporated as M/s Emgi Pharmaceuticals & Chemicals Private Limited in 1988. The company was founded by Dr. V. Manohar Rao, who is today the Chairman of Vivimed Labs Limited.

In 1997, the name changed to Vivimed Labs Limited. Vivimed was mainly into health care until its foray into the Home and Personal Care industry came with the advent of Triclosan. Rapid advances in the H&PC sector led to the company being listed with the BSE and the NSE in 2005. In 2007, VVS Pharma, a sister company which operated in the pharmaceutical and health-care sector merged with Vivimed Labs. The Specialty Chemicals Division was headed by Santosh Varalwar and the Health Care division was headed by Sandeep Varalwar.

In 2008, Vivimed Labs acquired James Robinson, a 170-year-old manufacturer of hair dyes, fluorescents, solvent ink dye markers and photochromics. James Robinson continued to operate independently until its assimilation into the Vivimed Group in 2010. James Robinson was renamed Vivimed Labs Europe in April 2010. Dr. Richard Smith, the MD of James Robinson before and during its acquisition was appointed as the COO of Vivimed Labs Limited. Its manufacturing base was shifted from Germany to Hyderabad, India. The Kilo Lab for Photochromics and hair dye R&D is still located in Huddersfield, UK. The James Robinson brand names of Jarocol for its hair dyes and Reversacol for photochromic dyes have been retained.

In 2009, Vivimed acquired Har-Met, a specialty chemicals distributor chain based in Pennsylvania.

In 2010, Har-Met was incorporated as Vivimed Labs USA Inc. Vivimed Labs USA Inc operates as a separate SBU in America, the biggest market in the home and personal care industry, and its neighboring countries.

== Specialty chemicals ==
In 1997, Hyderabad-based Vivimed Labs started manufacturing Triclosan, a product with anti-microbial properties and able to be incorporated in formulations. Vivimed entered this market supplying of Triclosan. In 2002, Vivimed diversified its product range and ventured into the other areas of the home and personal care sector.

Its current product range includes Sunscreens, Anti-wrinkle, Skin lightening, Preservative, Anti-dandruff, Hair Growth, Hair conditioners, Anti-microbial and Oral care.

== Vivimed Health Care ==
Vivimed Health Care is the pharmaceutical vertical of Vivimed Labs. Vivimed Health Care manufactures finished formulations and active pharmaceutical ingredients(APIs). The manufacturing units are located in Haridwar, Kashipur and Hyderabad and their R&D is located in Hyderabad. The major markets are the countries of the erstwhile USSR and Africa.

Drugs manufactured by Vivimed Health Care cater to the areas of diabetes, nutritional supplements, tuberculosis, oncology, hygiene and infectious diseases.
