= Onward Technologies =

IT services company

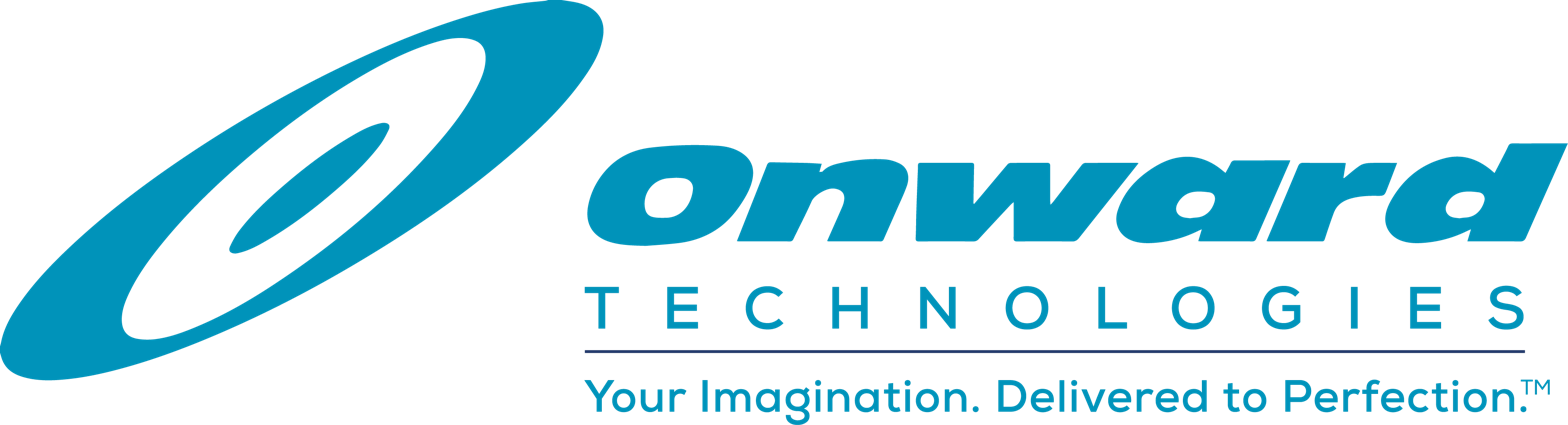
- Company type: Public
- Traded as: BSE: 517536; NSE: ONWARDTEC
- Industry: Industrial Equipment; Transportation; Healthcare
- Founded: 1991; 35 years ago
- Headquarters: Mumbai, Maharashtra, India
- Key people: Harish Mehta, (Executive Chairman) & Jigar Mehta (MD)
- Services: Engineering R&D Services; Digital Engineering Services; Business Consulting
- Revenue: ▲₹550.9 crore (US$58 million) (FY26)
- Net income: ▲₹46.7 crore (US$4.9 million) (FY26)
- Number of employees: 2,485 (FY26)
- Website: onwardgroup.com

Onward Technologies is an Indian multinational software technology outsourcing company specializing in digital and ER&D services for the transportation & mobility, industrial equipment, heavy machinery, and healthcare & med-tech industries.

As per its filings with the BSE, it is reported to be headquartered in Mumbai and has 2,485 employees across 12 offices in 6 countries as well as offshore development centers in India. As of 31 March 2026, it has one Indian subsidiary and four foreign subsidiaries.

== Revenues ==
According to its filing with the BSE Limited, Onward Technologies reported FY26 revenue of ₹550.9 crore, reflecting a 10.5% YoY growth. The company also reported EBITDA of ₹71.9 crore, up 60.9% YoY, and PAT* of ₹46.7 crore, up 72.3% YoY.

== History ==
=== 1991–1996 ===
Onward Technologies was founded in August 1991 by Harish Mehta, a first-generation entrepreneur, one of the founders and the first elected Chairman of the National Association of Software and Service Companies (NASSCOM). The company listed on the BSE & NSE in 1995. Harish Mehta served as a CEO.

=== 1997–2010 ===
In 1997, the company expanded into the US with its subsidiary, Onward Technologies, Inc. becoming operational. In 1998, the company also set up a branch office in London Between 2001 and 2010, the company had diversified into the Engineering, Research & Development (ER&D) industry while also achieving ISO 9001 & ISO 27001 certifications for its offshore development centers in India. It had also opened offices in Chicago in this interim.

=== 2010 – present ===
In May 2016, Jigar Mehta (Harish Mehta's son) was appointed as the managing director. As per the annual report of the company for 2020-21 filed with BSE, the company has achieved Zero Net-Debt and the annual report of the company for 2021–22 filed with BSE confirms that it continues to be Net-Debt Free. It also delivered a record 28% year-on-year organic revenue growth in financial year ended 31 March 2022. In 2021, the company set up offices in Amsterdam and Canada By the end of 2021, Convergent Finance LLP, a private equity firm invested in the company and today owns approximately 24.7% stake.

In November 2021, Onward Technologies was awarded a Business Excellence Award by Dun & Bradstreet, as part of its Business Enterprises of Tomorrow recognition program and was recognized as the Engineering Partner of the Year in the Overall Technology Excellence category at the 4th Annual Innovation and Technology Inn-Tech 2022 awards. Subsequently, in October 2022, Onward Technologies was awarded Best ER&D Partner for Automotive and Industrial Equipment OEMs at the Quantic Technology Excellence Awards.

=== Services ===
Onward Technologies works across industries that include transportation and mobility, industrial equipment & heavy machinery as well as healthcare & Med Tech. It offers services across the following business lines:

- Digital Engineering Services like data science, data analytics, automation & cloud
- Embedded systems & Electronics engineering services
- Mechanical engineering services

== Locations ==
Country	State / Province	City
India	Maharashtra	Mumbai
India	Maharashtra	Pune
India	Tamil Nādu	Chennai
India	Karnataka	Bengaluru
India	Telangana	Hyderabad
United States	Illinois	Chicago
United States	Michigan	Detroit
Canada	Ontario	Toronto
United Kingdom	West Midlands	Birmingham
Germany	Bavaria	Munich
Netherlands	North Holland	Amsterdam

=== Awards ===
- In November 2021, Onward Technologies was recognized by Dun & Bradstreet as a 'Business Enterprise of Tomorrow' for helping its clients accelerate innovation, drive competitiveness, and maximize returns on their R&D investments.
- In June 2022, Onward Technologies was recognized as the Engineering Partner of the Year in the Overall Technology Excellence category at the 4th Annual Innovation and Technology Inn-Tech 2022 awards.
- In October 2022, Onward Technologies was awarded Best ER&D Partner for Automotive and Industrial Equipment OEMs at the Quantic Technology Excellence Awards
