= Transport Corporation of India =

Indian logistic company

Transport Corporation of India (TCI)
- Type: Public
- Traded as: NSE: TCI; BSE: 532349
- Industry: Logistics and supply chain management
- Founded: 1958
- Headquarters: Gurgaon, Haryana, India
- Area served: Worldwide
- Key people: D.P.Agarwal ( Management), Vineet Agarwal (Management), Chander Agarwal ( Management)
- Brands: TCI Supply Chain Solutions, TCI Express, TCI Freight, TCI Global, TCI Seaways, TCI Foundation
- Number of employees: 30,000+
- Website: Official website

Transport Corporation of India Limited is an Indian logistics and supply chain management company headquartered in Gurugram, Haryana, India. It was founded in 1958 by Prabhu Dayal Agarwal at Kolkata, India.

== History ==
Transport Corporation of India Limited was founded in 1958 and initially as a freight transport company. Later, the company expanded its logistics operations across India.

In 1995, Transport Corporation of India operates TCI Seaways, as its sea cargo division. The division is engaged in coastal and international shipping activities, including the movement of container, bulk, and project cargo.

In 1996, Transport Corporation of India started the TCI XPS division, which later became TCI Express. The division provides domestic and international courier services by road, rail, and air, and provides e-commerce delivery services in India.

In 2008, TCI Express was incorporated as TCI Properties (Pune) Limited. In 2025, It was renamed TCI Express Limited, and in 2016 the division was demerged and became an independent publicly listed company.

In 2008, Transport Corporation of India incorporated TCI Developers Ltd as a wholly-owned subsidiary. The division focuses on the development of commercial and residential properties, along with warehouses and logistics parks.

Transport Corporation of India operates TCI Supply Chain Solutions (TCI SCS), a division engaged in supply chain and logistics activities, including warehousing and distribution services.

In September 2025, TCI opened a 3 lakh sq. ft. warehouse on 10.5 acres at CGTA Nagar in Kolkata. The facility serves as a logistics hub for eastern and northeastern India and supports cross border trade with Bangladesh, Bhutan and Southeast Asia.

In January 2026, TCI Express acquired of 100% of the equity shares of TCI Global (Singapore) through its wholly owned subsidiary, TCI Express Pte. Ltd.

The shares were acquired from TCI Holdings Asia Pacific, a step down wholly owned subsidiary of Transport Corporation of India. TCI Global (Singapore) had reported no turnover during the preceding three financial years.

== Joint ventures ==
Transystem TLI is a joint venture between TCI and Mitsui & Co Ltd, which is a logistics partner for Toyota Kirloskar Motors Ltd. in India.

TCI-CONCOR Multimodal Solutions Private Limited is a joint venture with Container Corporation of India (CONCOR) for bulk transport by rail and road.

In November 2021, TCI Cold Chain Solutions, a unit of Transport Corporation of India, formed a joint venture with Mitsui & Co. to expand temperature controlled logistics services in India.

In February 2026, TCI signed a MOU with Flying Whales and its subsidiary Flying Whales Services to explore the use of heavy lift airships for logistics operations in India.

The agreement included an assessment of the LCA60T, a rigid cargo airship with a proposed payload capacity of up to 60 tonnes and the ability to load and unload cargo while stationary in flight. The companies identified potential applications in sectors including defence, energy, infrastructure, construction, disaster relief and healthcare, particularly for transporting oversized cargo to remote or high altitude locations.

== TCI Foundation ==
TCI Foundation, the social responsibility arm of Transport Corporation of India. The foundation is involved in initiatives related to health, education, women’s development, disability, and disaster relief.

== Subsidiaries ==
=== TCI-Concor Multimodal Solutions Private Limited ===
Transport Corporation of India Limited and Container Corporation of India joint venture, the company provides multimodal rail road logistics services by combining TCI’s road transport network with CONCOR’s rail infrastructure.

=== TCI Chemlog Private Limited ===
TCI Chemlog Private Limited provides integrated logistics solutions for the safe and compliant handling of chemical products across solid, liquid and gaseous states.

=== TCI Bangladesh Limited ===
TCI Bangladesh delivers integrated, single window logistics and supply chain solutions. Headquartered in Dhaka, it operates across critical transit points, Petrapole, Benapole and Chittagong Port, to serve a growing clientele.

=== Others ===
TCI Transportation Company Nigeria Limited,TCI Global (HKG) Limited, TCI Chatbot, TCI Global Logistik Verwaltungs GmbH i.L. Eschborn, TCI Global (Thailand) Co., Ltd., TCI Global (Malaysia) SDN. BHD., TCI Holdings SA&E Pte Ltd, TCI Global Brazil Logistica Ltda, TCI Global Holdings (Mauritius) Limited, TCI Global (Singapore) Pte Ltd, TCI Crystal Report, TCI Holdings Asia Pacific Pte Ltd, TCI Global Shanghai Company Limited,PT TCI Global Indonesia,TCI Prosperities Pune Ltd
