= Puravankara Limited =

Indian publicly-held real estate development company

- Type: Public
- Traded as: BSE: 532891; NSE: PURVA
- Industry: Real estate & construction
- Founded: 1975; 51 years ago
- Founder: Ravi Puravankara
- Area served: Worldwide
- Key people: Ravi Puravankara (Chairman); Nani R Choksey (Vice-Chairman); Ashish Puravankara (Managing Director); Mallanna Sasalu (CEO South)
- Products: Residential, Commercial
- Number of employees: 2700+ (2021)
- Website: www.puravankara.com

Puravankara Limited is an Indian real estate development company. Founded in 1975 by Ravi Puravankara, the company is headquartered in Bengaluru, Karnataka. It develops residential and commercial properties in several Indian cities and has also undertaken projects outside India.

== History ==
Puravankara was founded in 1975 by Ravi Puravankara.

In March 2017, Puravankara sold a 19-acre property in Hyderabad to Hetero Group for ₹475 crore. In March 2017, The company's board passed a resolution to divest its investment in Raidurg Panamaktha Village, which is valued at Rs 403 crore.

In January 2018, Puravankara Projects Ltd changed its name to Puravankara Ltd.

In September 2019, Abhishek Kapoor was appointed chief operating officer and later promoted to the role of CEO in April 2019.

In May 2025, Abhishek Kapoor stepped down, and Mallanna Sasalu was appointed as CEO South.

== Funding ==
In March 2011, Puravankara raised foreign direct investment from Keppel Corporation of Singapore.

In April 2015, Puravankara received ₹82 crore (US$13 million) from ASK Group for its subsidiary, Provident Housing.

In December 2020, Puravankara obtained a $76 million investment from International Finance Corporation (IFC) and IFC Emerging Asia Fund for its affordable housing projects under the housing brand Provident.

In April 2022, Puravankara launched a fund of ₹750 crore to invest in affordable housing projects.

In April 2024, Provident Housing received ₹1,150 crore investment from HDFC Capital.
