= The Indian Card Clothing Company =

Clothing company headquartered in India

The Indian Card Clothing Company Ltd.
- Company type: Public
- Traded as: BSE: 509692; NSE: INDIANCARD
- Industry: Textile, Precision Engineering
- Founded: 24-June-1955
- Headquarters: Pune
- Key people: Alok Misra (Chief Executive Officer), Chadrakant Patil (Chief Financial Officer), Amogh Barve (Company Secretary)
- Products: Cylinder Wires, Doffer Wires, Lickerin Wires, Flat Tops
- Brands: Primus, Maxus, Tenace, Crystal, AeroDoffer, Sharprite, Accura, XTRAC
- Number of employees: 400+
- Subsidiaries: Garnet Wires Ltd.
- Website: www.Cardindia.com

The Indian Card Clothing Company Ltd. (abbreviated as ICC) is a Bombay Stock Exchange and National Stock Exchange listed company headquartered in Pune, India. Founded in 1955, ICC is a precision engineering company that manufactures and supplies card clothing products and carding solutions for the textile industry.

== History ==
It was incorporated on 24 June 1955 as a private company and in 1975 was converted to a public listed company jointly promoted by Carclo Engineering and English Card Clothing. In 1985, English Card Clothing (100% subsidiary of Carclo Engineering) sold its 57% stake in ICC to the new management.

Currently, Mauritius based Multi-Act Industrial Enterprises Limited is the holding company with 57.35% equity in the organization.

ICC also holds a 100% equity in UK-based Garnett Wires that manufactures card clothing for the non-woven segment.

== Products ==
ICC manufactures and supplies carding solutions for the textile industry.

== Facilities ==
The Indian Card Clothing manufacturing facilities are in Pune, Maharashtra and Nalagarh, Himachal Pradesh.

== Locations ==
The company has offices in India and overseas.
