= Rossari Biotech =

Indian specialty chemicals manufacturer

Rossari Biotech Limited
- Company type: Public
- Traded as: BSE: 543213; NSE: ROSSARI
- ISIN: INE02A801020
- Industry: Specialty chemicals
- Founded: August 10, 2009; 15 years ago
- Headquarters: 201 A-B 2nd Floor LBS Marg, Akruti Corporate Park, Kanjurmarg (W), Mumbai, Maharashtra, India
- Area served: India, Bangladesh, Vietnam, and Mauritius
- Key people: Edward Menezes (Co-Founder & Executive Chairman); Sunil Chari (Co-Founder & Managing director)
- Website: https://www.rossari.com

Rossari Biotech is an Indian chemical manufacturing company with a focus on specialty chemicals. It is also engaged in production of specialty enzymes and chemicals in India that is used in the pharmaceuticals, paper, construction, textiles, nutrition and animal health industries. The company was started in 2003 as a partnership firm titled Rossari Labtech and was incorporated into a company in 2009 and was renamed as Rossari Biotech.

It has two R&D facilities, one at Silvassa manufacturing facility and the second in Dahej.

== Awards ==
- BIRAC Best Innovator award (2014)
- Bio Excellence award from Government of Karnataka (2011)
