= GTL Infrastructure =

Indian telecom tower company

- Company type: public company
- Traded as: BSE: 532775; NSE: GTLINFRA
- Founded: 2004
- Headquarters: Navi Mumbai, India
- Products: Network Services Provider
- Number of employees: 1075
- Website: GTL Infrastructure Limited

GTL Infrastructure Limited (GTL Infra) is an Indian telecom tower company that focuses on shared passive telecom infrastructure.

Headquartered in Navi Mumbai, Maharashtra, India, GTL Infra operates approximately 28,000 towers across 22 telecom circles in India, facilitating the provision of 2G, 3G, and 4G services by telecom service providers. It was incorporated in 2004 by Manoj G. Tirodkar, who serves as the chairman of the company.

== History ==
In 2006, GTL Infra was listed on the Bombay Stock Exchange (BSE) and the National Stock Exchange (NSE), becoming the first company in India’s shared telecom infrastructure sector to be publicly listed. The following year, GTL Infra launched a rights issue valued at US$83.86 million. In 2010, the company acquired 17,500 towers and 21,000 tenants from Aircel.

GTL Infra was also affected by the cancellation of licenses, as its customer base decreased due to issues faced by Aircel and Maxis, along with the subsequent cancellation of the Right of First Refusal (ROFR) by Aircel. In the subsequent years, GTL Infra undertook debt restructuring efforts.

== Listing ==
The company's equity shares are listed on the National Stock Exchange of India Limited (NSE) and the Bombay Stock Exchange (BSE). Additionally, its Foreign Currency Convertible Bonds are listed on the Singapore Exchange Securities Trading Limited.

== Services ==
GTL Infra owns urban and rural telecom towers located in all the 22 telecom circles in India, which are shared by all telecom operators in the country. GTL Infra also offers real-time monitoring from its NOC (Network Operations Centre) and operations and maintenance services.

== Awards & Recognition ==
- GTL Infra received the Best Infrastructure Brands award from Economic Times in 2016.
- GTL Infra received the 'Best Independent Infrastructure Provider' in the Telecom Operator Award 2010 by leading telecom magazine tele.net.
- GTL Infra was received the 10th Greentech Environment Excellence Silver Award in 2009 by Greentech.
