= JioPhone 2 =

4G LTE feature phone made by Jio

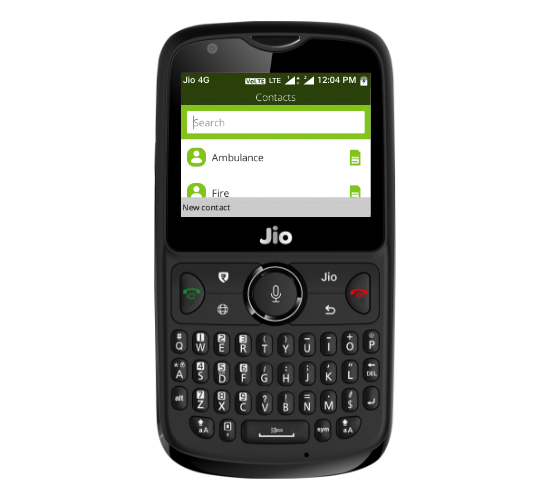
- Manufacturer: LYF
- Type: Feature phone
- Series: JioPhone
- First released: August 2018; 7 years ago
- Predecessor: JioPhone
- Related: JioPhone
- Compatible networks: 4G LTE
- Color: Black
- Operating system: KaiOS
- CPU: Cores: dual core; Speed: 1 GHz
- Memory: 512 MB RAM
- Storage: 4 GB internal storage
- Removable storage: microSD; expandable up to 128 GB
- SIM: 4G supported Nano-SIM
- Battery: 2,000 mAh removable battery
- Rear camera: 2 MP
- Front camera: 0.3 MP
- Display: Size: 2.4 inches; Type: TFT; Resolution: 320 × 240
- Sound: Loudspeaker; 3.5 mm headphone jack
- Connectivity: Wi-Fi; Bluetooth; GPS; NFC; FM radio

The JioPhone 2 is a feature phone marketed by Jio which runs the KaiOS operating system. The successor to the original JioPhone, it was announced on 5 July 2018 during Reliance Industries' annual general meeting of that year and released in August 2018.

== Specifications ==
The JioPhone 2 has a 2.4-inch TFT display with a resolution of 320 × 240, a 2-megapixel rear camera and a 0.3-megapixel front camera. It comes with 512 MB of RAM and 4 GB of internal storage, expandable with a microSD card with storage of up to 128 GB, and support for 4G LTE, Wi-Fi, Bluetooth and NFC. Its processor is a 1 GHz dual-core Spreadtrum and its battery is removable and has a capacity of 2000 mAh

The JioPhone 2 runs the KaiOS operating system which includes support for WhatsApp, Facebook and YouTube.
