= Nokia 2660 Flip =

2022 mobile phone model

Nokia 2660 Flip HMD 2660 Flip
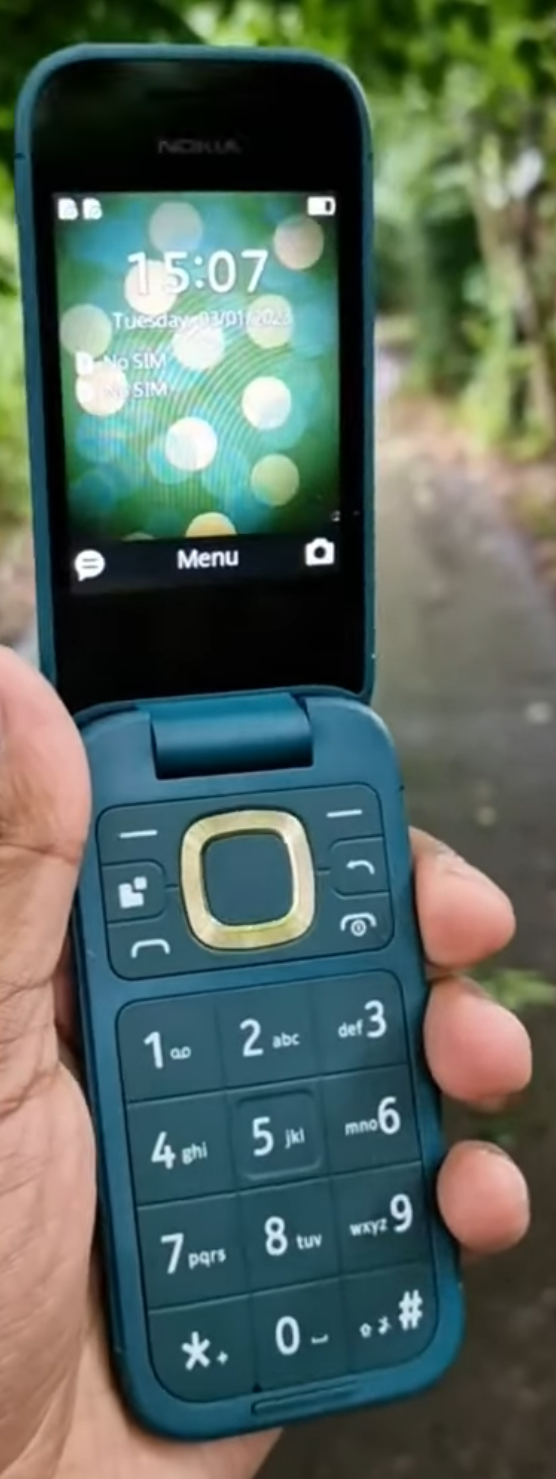
- Brand: Nokia; HMD Global
- Developer: HMD Global
- Manufacturer: Foxconn
- Type: Feature phone
- First released: 2022 (Nokia 2660 Flip); 2025 (HMD 2660 Flip)
- Compatible networks: GSM GPRS EDGE 4G LTE
- Dimensions: 108×55×18.9 mm (4.25×2.17×0.74 in) (folded)
- Weight: 123 g (4.3 oz)
- Operating system: MOCOR (with Nokia Series 30+ interface)
- System-on-chip: 1.0 GHz Unisoc T107
- Memory: 64 MB of RAM, 128 MB of storage
- Removable storage: microSD, up to 32 GB
- Battery: 1450 mAh Li-ion, removable
- Rear camera: 0.3 MP with LED flash
- Display: 2.8 in (71 mm) 240 x 320 QVGA TFT
- Connectivity: 3.5 mm headphone jack; Bluetooth 5.0; FM radio, Stereo; Micro USB
- Data inputs: Keypad

The Nokia 2660 Flip is a Nokia-branded mobile phone developed by HMD Global, released in March 2022. It is a clamshell style flip phone that runs Series 30+. Its design is closely based on the Nokia 2760/2780 Flip. The 2660 Flip is marketed globally.

The 2660 Flip has similar specifications to the Nokia 8210 4G introduced at the same time. In mid 2023, two new colour configurations were released: Pop Pink and Lush Green.

It shares its name with an older 2007 flip phone called Nokia 2660. While the 2660 Flip has been classified as part of Nokia Originals, it does not seem to bear strong resemblance to the original 2660.

== Variants ==
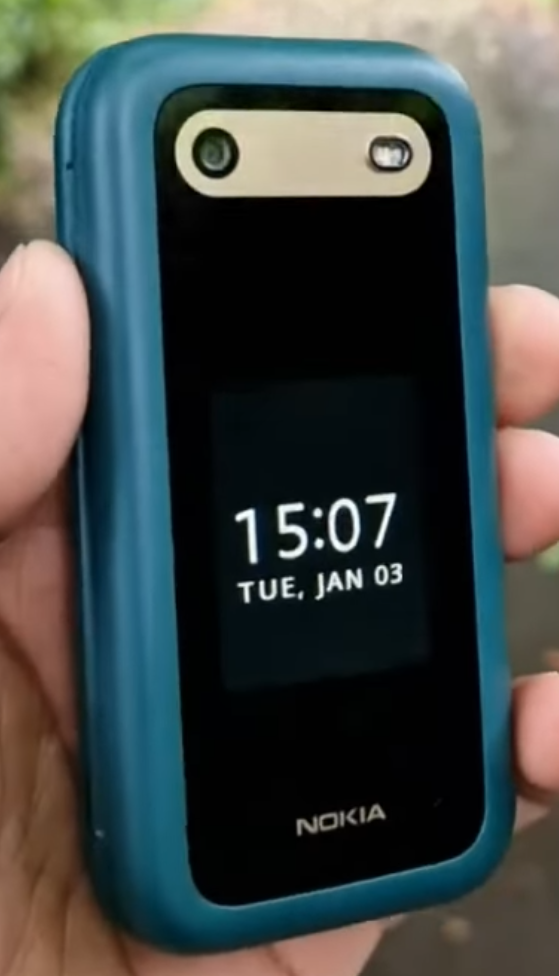
2660 Flip in Lush Green, when folded

In 2024, HMD Global released two special variants based on Nokia 2660 Flip:

- The Boring Phone (2024), in cooperation with Heineken and Bodega, is based on the Nokia 2660 Flip, with a monochrome screen and fewer features.
- HMD Barbie Phone (2024) in Europe and China, in cooperation with Mattel, is based on the Nokia 2660 Flip, with Barbie's theme design and features.

== HMD 2660 Flip ==
In 2025, HMD Global released an improved version, branded HMD 2660 Flip, with a number of cosmetic changes and features taken from the HMD Barbie Phone.

== See also ==
- Nokia Originals
- Nokia 2720 Flip
