= Nokia Originals =

Like of feature phones

Nokia 8210 4G, a model of the Nokia Originals line based on the 1999 released Nokia 8210

Nokia Originals is a line of feature phones and smartphones produced since 2017 by HMD Global, the exclusive licensee for Nokia branded mobile devices. It consists of modern revivals of past Nokia mobile phones. All include features such as keypads with non-touchscreen displays, cameras with flash, expandable memory, Bluetooth and FM radios. Some models have 4G modems, while some run on KaiOS or Android and therefore provide extras such as Wi-Fi, GPS and more web services.

The table below is a quick overview of the Nokia Originals range of handsets:

Device name	Based on...	Announced	Networks	OS	Form factor	Dimensions
Nokia 3310 (2017)	Nokia 3310 (2000)	26 February 2017	2G	Series 30+ (based on MediaTek MAUI)	Candybar	115.6 x 51 x 12.8 mm
Nokia 3310 3G	Nokia 3310 (2000)	28 September 2017	2G/3G	Smart Feature OS/Series 30+ (2019 version), both were based on Mocor OS	Candybar	117 x 52.4 x 13.4 mm
Nokia 3310 4G	Nokia 3310 (2000)	30 January 2018 (China)	2G/3G/4G	YunOS (based on Android)	Candybar	117 x 52.4 x 13.4 mm
Nokia 8110 4G	Nokia 8110 (1996)	25 February 2018	2G/3G/4G	Smart Feature OS (based on KaiOS)	Slider	133.5 x 49.3 x 14.9 mm
Nokia 2720 Flip	Nokia 2720 fold (2009)	5 September 2019	2G/3G/4G	KaiOS	Clamshell	192.7 x 54.5 x 11.6 mm (unfolded)
Nokia 5310 (2020)	Nokia 5310 (2007)	19 March 2020	2G	Series 30+ (based on MediaTek MAUI)	Candybar	123.7 x 52.4 x 13.1 mm
Nokia 6300 4G	Nokia 6300 (2007)	12 November 2020	2G/3G/4G	KaiOS	Candybar	131.4 x 53 x 13.7 mm
Nokia 6310 (2021)	Nokia 6310 (2001)	27 July 2021	2G	Series 30+ (based on Mocor OS)	Candybar	135.5 x 56 x 14.1 mm
Nokia 8210 4G	Nokia 8210 (1999)	12 July 2022	2G/3G/4G	Series 30+ (based on Mocor OS)	Candybar	131.3 x 56.2 x 13.8 mm
Nokia 2660 Flip	Nokia 2660 (2007)	12 July 2022	2G/3G/4G	Series 30+ (based on Mocor OS)	Clamshell	108 x 55 x 18.9 mm (folded)
Nokia 5310 (2024)	Nokia 5310 (2007)	11 April 2024	2G	Series 30+ (based on Mocor OS)	Candybar	132 x 57 x 13.1 mm
Nokia 6310 (2024)	Nokia 6310 (2001)	11 April 2024	2G	Series 30+ (based on Mocor OS)	Candybar	135.5 x 56 x 14.1 mm
Nokia 3210 (2024)	Nokia 3210 (1999)	7 May 2024	2G/3G/4G	Series 30+ (based on Mocor OS)	Candybar	122 x 52 x 13.1 mm
HMD 2660 Flip	Nokia 2660 (2007)	2025	2G/3G/4G	Series 30+ (based on Mocor OS)	Clamshell	108 x 55 x 18.9 mm (folded)
HMD Barça 3210	Nokia 3210 (1999)	2025	2G/3G/4G	Series 30+ (based on Mocor OS)	Candybar	122 x 52 x 13.1 mm
HMD Asha 305	Nokia Asha 305 (2013)	2026	2G/3G/4G	Pulse OS (based on Android)	Slate	147 × 71.5 × 10.2 mm

== See also ==
- List of HMD Global products
- List of Nokia products
