= JioPhone =

4G LTE feature phone made by Jio

- A vector illustration of the JioPhone
- Manufacturer: LYF
- Type: Feature phone
- First released: August 2017; 8 years ago
- Successor: JioPhone 2
- Compatible networks: 4G LTE
- Form factor: Bar
- Color: Black
- Operating system: KaiOS
- CPU: Chipset: Spreadtrum SC9820A; Cores: Dual Core; Speed: 1 GHz; Cortex A7
- GPU: Mali-400
- Memory: 512 MB RAM
- Storage: 4 GB internal storage
- Removable storage: microSD; expandable up to 128 GB
- SIM: 4G supported Nano-SIM
- Battery: 2,000 mAh removable battery
- Rear camera: 2 MP
- Front camera: 0.3 MP
- Display: Size: 2.4 inches; Type: TFT; Resolution: 240 × 320
- Sound: Loudspeaker; 3.5 mm headphone jack
- Connectivity: Wi-Fi; Bluetooth; GPS; NFC; FM radio

JioPhone is a feature phone marketed by Jio which runs the KaiOS operating system. It supports 4G LTE network and comes with KaiOS. It was announced on 21 July 2017 during Reliance Industries' annual general meeting of that year and released in August 2017. It was succeeded by the JioPhone 2 in August 2018.

== Specifications ==
The JioPhone has a 2.4-inch TFT display with a resolution of 240 × 320, a 2-megapixel rear camera and a 0.3-megapixel front camera. It comes with 512 MB of RAM and 4 GB of internal storage, expandable with a microSD card with storage of up to 128 GB, and support for 4G LTE, Wi-Fi, Bluetooth and NFC. Its processor is a 1 GHz dual-core Spreadtrum SC9820A with a Mali-400 GPU and its battery is removable and has a capacity of 2000 mAh

JioPhone runs the KaiOS operating system. It also has support for Facebook and YouTube.
