= Nokia 2780 Flip =

2022 flip phone model

- Brand: Nokia
- Developer: HMD Global
- Type: Feature phone
- First released: November 17, 2022
- Availability by region: November 2022
- Predecessor: Nokia 2760 Flip
- Related: Nokia 2720 Flip
- Compatible networks: GSM, HSPA, LTE
- Form factor: Flip
- Colors: Blue, Red
- Dimensions: 110.2 mm × 58 mm × 19.5 mm (4.34 in × 2.28 in × 0.77 in) (closed)
- Weight: 131.2 g (4.63 oz)
- Operating system: KaiOS 3.1
- System-on-chip: Qualcomm QM215 Snapdragon 215 (28 nm)
- CPU: Quad-core 1.3 GHz Cortex-A53
- GPU: Adreno 308
- Memory: 512 MB RAM
- Storage: 4 GB
- Removable storage: microSDHC up to 32 GB (dedicated slot)
- Battery: Li-Ion 1450 mAh, removable
- Rear camera: 5 MP with LED flash
- Front camera: No
- Display: 2.7 inches TFT LCD, 240 x 320 pixels, 4:3 ratio (~148 ppi density)
- External display: 1.77 inches, 128 x 160 pixels
- Sound: Loudspeaker, 3.5 mm jack
- Connectivity: Wi-Fi 802.11 b/g/n Bluetooth 4.2, A2DP; GPS (A-GPS); USB Type-C 2.0; Wireless FM radio
- Development status: Available

The Nokia 2780 Flip is a feature phone branded and released by Nokia on November 17, 2022. The device runs on KaiOS 3.1 with Google Maps and YouTube support, RTT support, and expandable stoage up to 4 gigabytes via microSD card.

In terms of design, it was similar to the Nokia 2760 Flip. With a battery capacity of 1,450 mAh, it provides a talk time of 3 hours and 20 minutes with VoLTE, 4 days of battery life, and 18 days or less usage of the device.
