= Nokia 800 =

Nokia 800 may refer to:

- Nokia Lumia 800, a Windows Phone 7-powered smartphone
- Nokia 800 Tough, a Kai OS-powered phone
- Nokia N800, an Internet tablet
