= Nokia 5310 (2020) =

Nokia feature phone

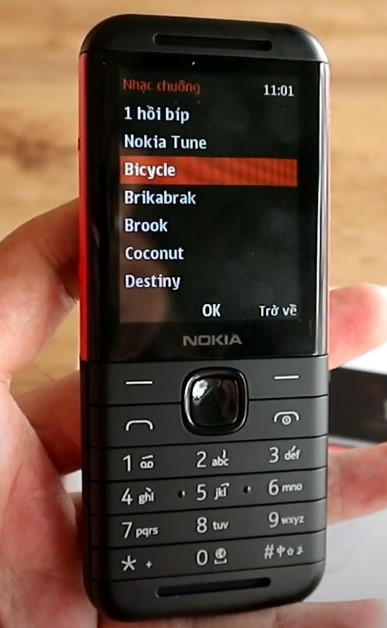
- A Nokia 5310 (2020) showing its ringtones.
- Brand: Nokia
- Developer: HMD Global
- Manufacturer: Foxconn
- Type: Feature phone
- Series: Nokia Originals
- First released: March 19, 2020; 6 years ago
- Predecessor: Nokia 5310
- Successor: Nokia 5310 (2024)
- Related: Nokia 3310 (2017); Nokia 8110 4G
- Compatible networks: GSM
- Form factor: Bar, candybar
- Dimensions: H: 123.7 mm (4.87 in); W: 52.4 mm (2.06 in); D: 13.1 mm (0.52 in)
- Weight: 88.2 g (3.11 oz)
- System-on-chip: MediaTek MT6260A
- Memory: 8 MB
- Storage: 16 MB
- Removable storage: microSD, up to 32GB
- Battery: 1200 mAh Li-ion (removable) (BL-4UL) standby time: up to 22 days (Dual SIM) or 30 days (Single SIM)
- Rear camera: VGA with LED flash
- Display: 2.4 in (61 mm) 240×320 QVGA TFT LCD
- Sound: Vibration, MIDI ringtones
- Data inputs: Alphanumeric keypad
- Website: www.hmd.com/en_int/nokia-5310

The Nokia 5310 (2020) is a Nokia-branded feature phone developed by HMD Global, one of the Nokia Originals. It was announced on 19 March 2020 alongside the Nokia 1.3, Nokia 5.3 and Nokia 8.3 5G, as a revival of the original Nokia 5310 XpressMusic produced c. 2007.

== Functions and design ==
The 5310 functions primarily as a media-player with FM-radio, an MP3-player, support for Bluetooth 3.0 and front-facing stereo-speakers. A 3.5 mm audio jack is also present, and dedicated music buttons are located on the side. The phone has a 2.4" QVGA resolution display. On the rear, there is a VGA camera accompanied by an LED-flash. Internal storage is limited to 16 MB, but can be expanded up to 32 GB via a microSD card slot. The battery is rated at 1200 mAh and can provide 7.5 hours of talk time; standby ranges between 30 days for Single-SIM and 22 days for Dual-SIM. The device only supports dual-band 2G.

The design is styled after the original 5310 with the same color-schemes, Black/Red and White/Red.

== 2024 version ==
In April 2024, HMD Global announced the 2024 version of revival Nokia 5310, with design similar to the 2020 version, but with some improvements, like a larger screen at 2.8 inches IPS LCD (compared to the 2.4-inch TFT LCD of the 2020 version), bigger 1450 mAh battery (compared to the 1200 mAh battery), Unisoc 6531F chipset (compared to the MediaTek MT6260A chipset) and USB-C support (compared to the micro USB 1.1 support) and run Mocor RTOS with Series 30+ user interface (compared to MediaTek MAUI), meaning MRE (.vxp) apps are no longer supported. It is unlikely that the new 5310 will support any user-installed applications.
