= WHP =

WHP may refer to:

== Engineering and technology ==
- Wellhead platform, the platform located above the head of a gas or oil well and used to drill and to operate the well
- with high probability, mathematical term
- Wheel horsepower
- wireless home phone

== Media ==
- WHP (AM), a radio station licensed to serve Harrisburg, Pennsylvania, United States
- WHP-TV, a television station licensed to serve Harrisburg, Pennsylvania, United States
- WRVV, a radio station licensed to serve Harrisburg, Pennsylvania, United States, which held the call sign WHP-FM from 1946 to 1992

== Music and entertainment ==
- The Warehouse Project, a series of club nights organised in Manchester, England
- "Wild Honey Pie", a 1968 song from The Beatles (aka "The White Album")
- Walang Hanggang Paalam, a Philippine drama television series

== Places ==
- Wallace Hall (Thornhill), a 2-18 school located in Thornhill, Dumfries and Galloway
- Naga Airport (IATA code WHP), an airport in Bicol Region, Philippines
- Western Highlands (Papua New Guinea), a province of Papua New Guinea
- West Hampstead Thameslink railway station (National Rail station code WHP), a railway station in London, England
- Whiteman Airport (IATA code WHP), a general aviation airport located in Los Angeles, California, United States

== Other ==
- Weekend Hashtag Project, the abbreviation used by Instagrammers as a hashtag in itself or in front of the subject used as a weekly project
- White House Police Force, founded in 1922, now the Uniformed Division of the U.S. Secret Service
- WHP Global, American brand management company
- Wyoming Highway Patrol, the de facto civilian police agency located in Wyoming, United States
