= Nokia 3210 (2024) =

2024 mobile phone model by HMD Global

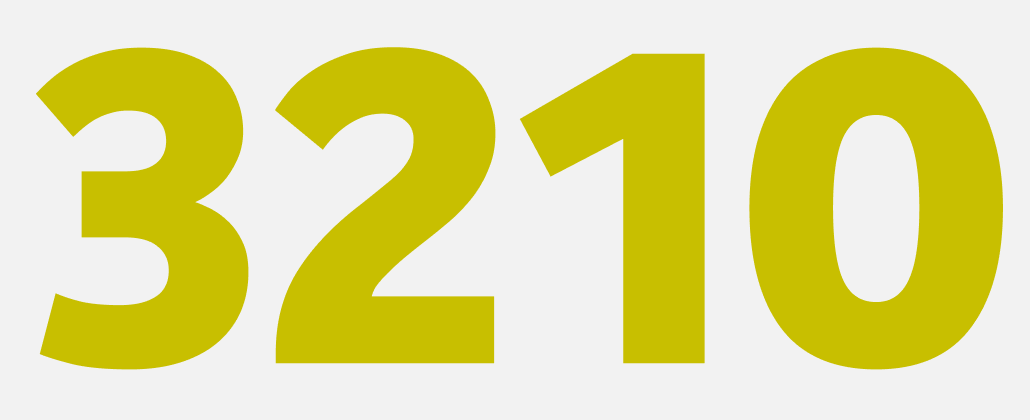

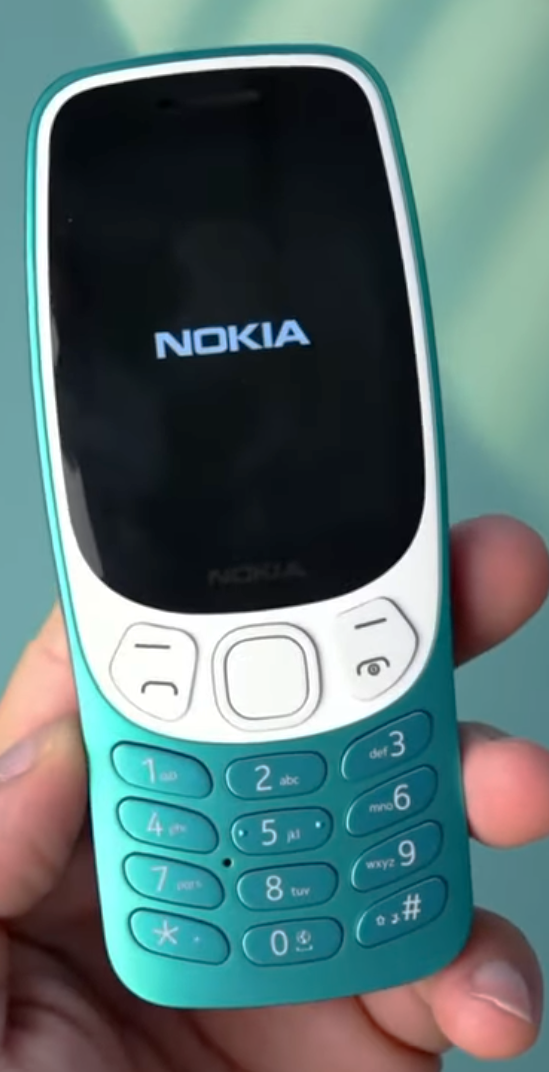
- Brand: Nokia
- Developer: HMD Global
- Manufacturer: Foxconn
- Type: Feature phone
- Series: Nokia Originals
- First released: May 8, 2024
- Predecessor: Nokia 3210
- Compatible networks: GSM (900/1800 MHz); GPRS, EDGE and 4G LTE
- Dimensions: H: 122 mm (4.8 in); W: 52 mm (2.0 in); D: 13.1 mm (0.52 in)
- Weight: 87 g (3.1 oz)
- Operating system: MOCOR (with Nokia Series 30+ interface)
- System-on-chip: Unisoc T107
- Memory: 64 MB of RAM, 128 MB of storage
- Removable storage: microSD, up to 32 GB
- Battery: 1450 mAh Li-ion, removable
- Rear camera: 2 MP with LED flash
- Display: 2.4 in (61 mm) 240 x 320 QVGA TFT
- Connectivity: 3.5 mm headphone jack; Bluetooth 5.0; FM radio, Stereo; USB-C
- Data inputs: Keypad

The Nokia 3210 is a Nokia-branded mobile phone developed by HMD Global, released in May 2024. It is a revival of the 1999 Nokia 3210 with a design inspired by it but with updated specifications.

The Nokia 3210 is a 4G phone and is compatible with 2G GSM networks on the 900 and 1800 bands. It runs on Mocor OS with a Series 30+ interface, and it supports Cloud Phone technology in territories where the service is active. As with other recent feature phones produced by HMD, the Nokia 3210 has a USB-C charging port and a built-in FM radio.

The phone, along with other Nokia models, was discontinued in March 2026 in some European countries due to HMD's brand licensing terms running out. It continues to be sold in select markets for which HMD has extended their license to use the Nokia brand.

== History ==
The new Nokia 3210 was made official by HMD on 8 May 2024 amid the 25th anniversary of the popular original Nokia 3210, which was manufactured from 1999 to circa 2001. The 3210 is the latest of HMD's revivals of older Nokia phones as part of its Nokia Originals line and was announced not long after the Nokia 6310 (2024).

== Features ==
The Nokia 3210 has a 240x320 resolution, 2.4 inch colour display. It has a 2 megapixel camera with a flash (as opposed to the VGA resolution cameras found in most previous Nokia Originals). The internal user storage is 128 MB but is expandable to 32 GB using the MicroSD slot.

== Marketing ==
HMD have also marketed the Nokia 3210 as a "detox" phone and referred to letting people conversate in real life more than texting digitally.

== Variants ==
In April 2025, HMD Global announced a special version of the Nokia 3210 made in cooperation with FC Barcelona, called HMD Barça 3210 (not Nokia branded). It is based on the revival Nokia 3210 but with FC Barcelona's theme design and features. The Chinese version also features DeepSeek chatbot.

== Reception ==
In China, the Nokia 3210 reportedly sold out within two days of release.

Mashable noted that the phone has been released during a time of "Y2K nostalgia". CNET wrote that it was part of the "dumb-phone renaissance".

Guardian journalist Zoe Wood documented her week with the new product during July 2024. The Irish Times in its review gave Nokia 3210 three out of five and said it is a good smartphone replacement for a break, but not a long-term solution.
