= Doro (company) =

Swedish consumer electronics company

Doro AB
- Type: Subsidiary
- Traded as: Nasdaq Stockholm: DORO
- Industry: Consumer electronics, assistive technology
- Founded: 1974
- Headquarters: Malmö, Sweden
- Area served: Worldwide
- Revenue: 1,906.40 M SEK (2018)
- Parent: Xplora Technologies (2025–present)
- Website: www.doro.com

Doro AB, known as Doro, is a Swedish consumer electronics and assistive technology company focused on the elderly and improving the lives of seniors. Founded in 1974 in Sweden as a challenger to the state-run telecommuncations monopoly, the company develops communications products and services designed primarily for the elderly, such as mobile phones and telecare systems. Doro operates a number of alarm receiving centres in Sweden, Norway and the United Kingdom.

It underwent acquisition by telecoms and smartwatch company Xplora in 2024–2025.

The acquisition aimed to let Doro still operate as an independent entity, but bundle Xplora Connect sim cards with Doro phones, which is available in most European markets as of September 2026.

== Products ==
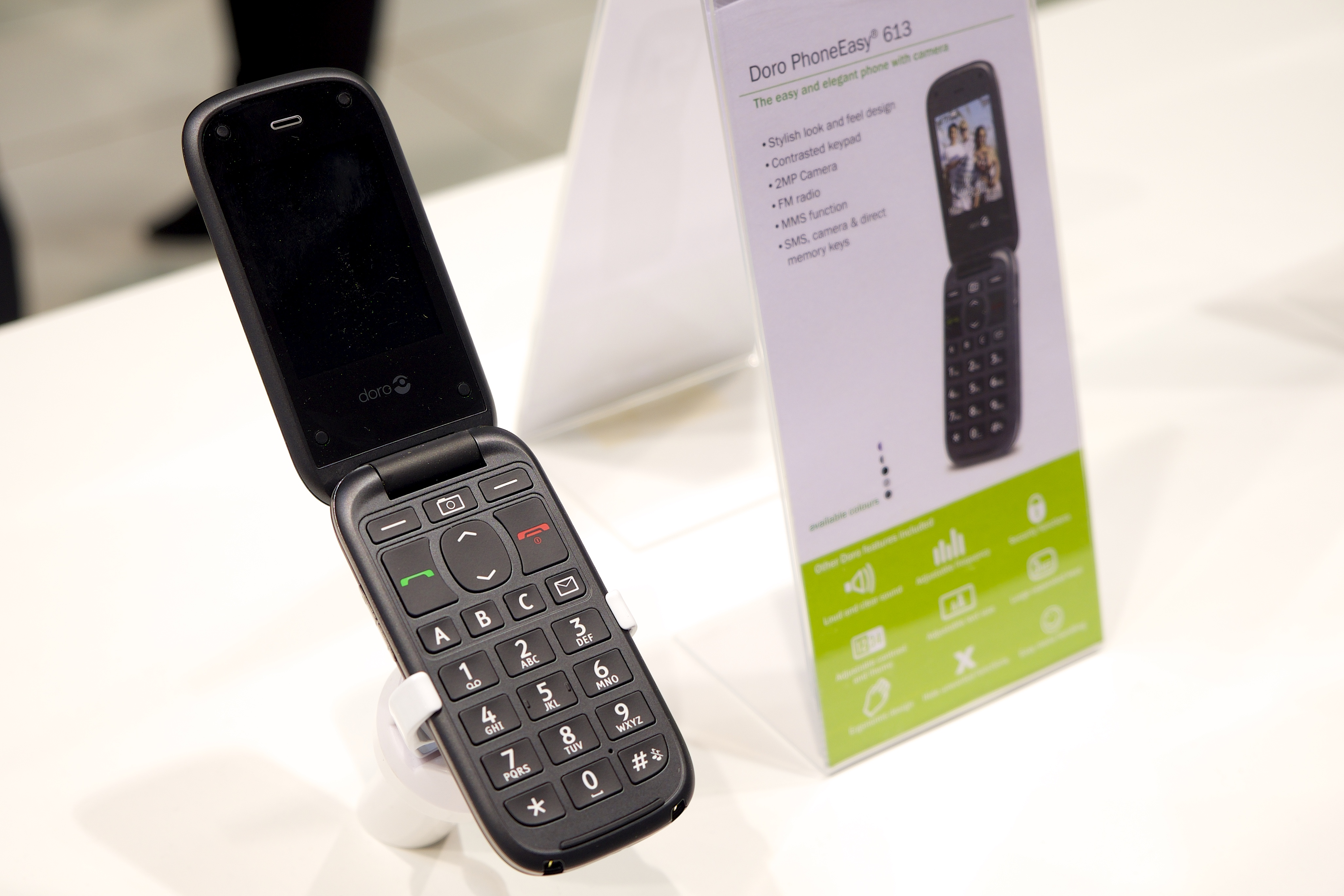
Doro PhoneEasy 613 (2015).

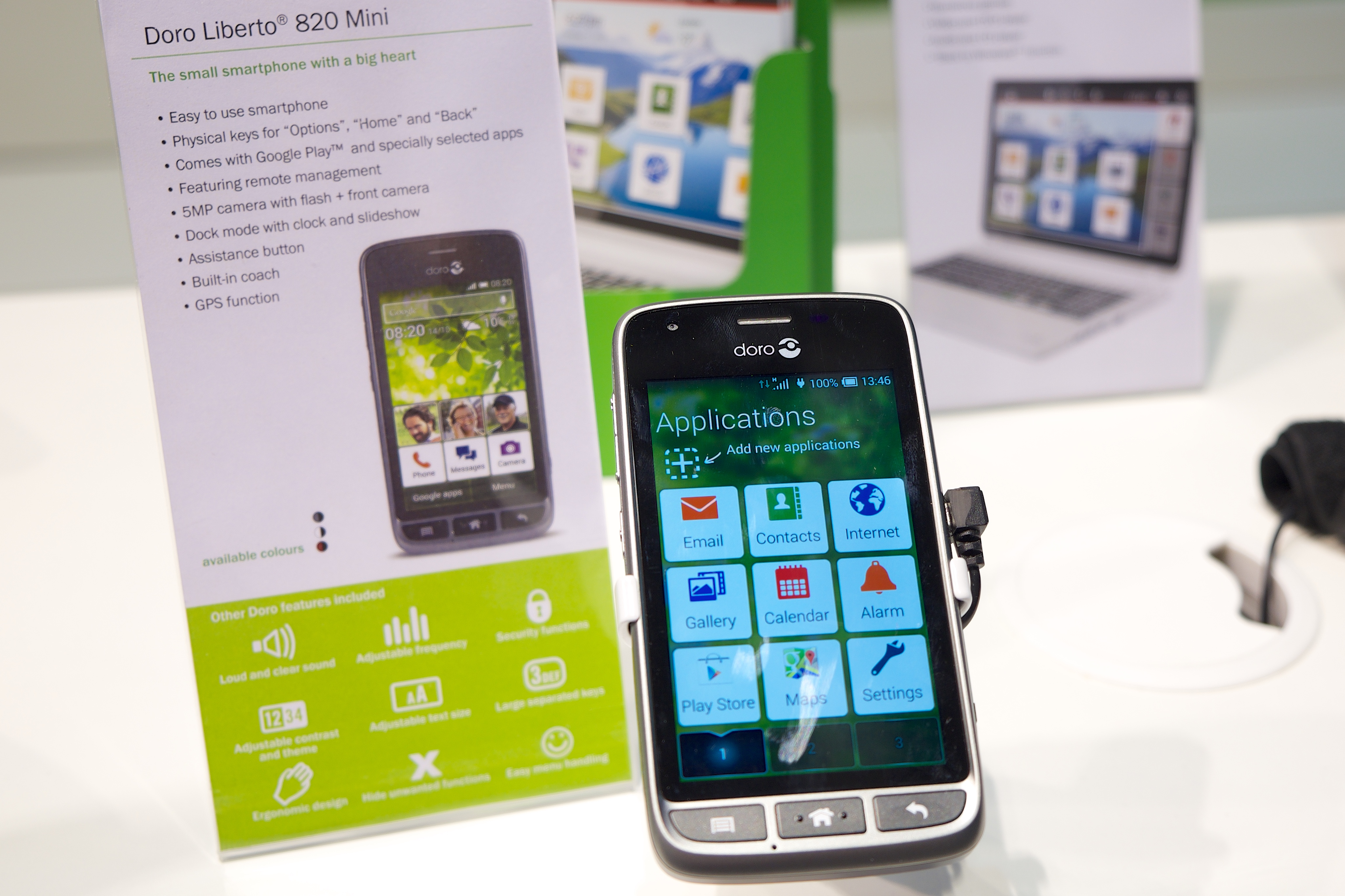
Doro Liberto 820 mini (2015).

Doro produce both clam- and bar-type feature phones which run Doro's own operating system, such as the Doro 6820 and the Doro 7060, and smartphones such as Doro 8080 and Doro 8100, which run on Android. Its devices are designed with loud and clear sound, large separated keys and an assistance button that alerts emergency contacts if the user needs help.

Mobile phones are named according to 'generations', starting with the simplest 1000 range bar-type mobiles, which have capabilities limited to texting, calling and a 0.3 MP (VGA) camera, progressing through 6000 and 5000 range clamshell and bar mobiles with email, video camera, calling, texting, Bluetooth and radio capabilities, all the way to the 4G 2000 range models.

7000 range mobiles are made in both form factors, are mobile phones based on versions of Android and KaiOS and have most smartphone capabilities while still retaining more classic style form factors. The 8000 range are fully fledged smartphones, with modern versions of Android.

Older mobile phones were put into similar three-digit generation groupings, with more subcategories such as mini (stylized in all lowercase), used for smaller phones.

The newest Doro range, Doro Leva, which is Swedish for Live, was announced in November 2024, and has a candybar form factor phone, the L10, a flip phone, the L20, and another flip phone, the L30, with an external screen in the series, as well as their lower-end variants with E prefixes.

Other Doro products

- Doro HandleEasy 321rc: A seven-button basic remote control for Radios and Television sets
- Doro 3500 alarm trigger: An alarm trigger wristband/lanyard pairable with all Doro mobile phones with texting ability.
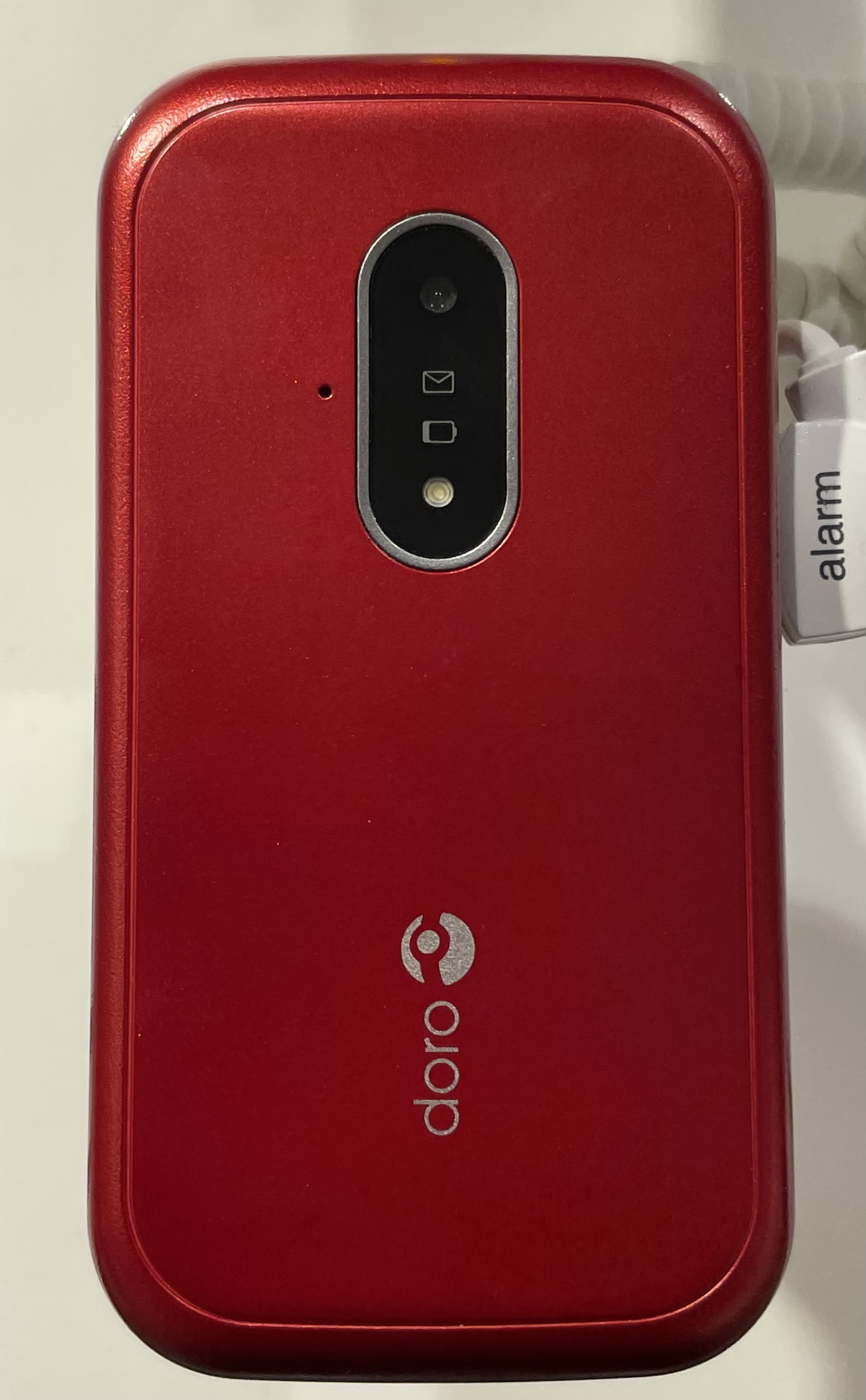
- Doro 7031 when shut
  Doro Tablet: An Android tablet based on EVA, a simple senior-friendly Android interface.
- Doro Watch: A smartwatch not unlike Motorola smartwatches, compatible with all Android Touchscreen phones.
- Doro HearingBuds: Sound Enhancement devices compatible with all Android touchscreen smartphones.

== Telecare ==
In August 2020 it acquired Eldercare UK, a domiciliary care service provider in the North of England, for about £2.2 million. It had 109 full-time equivalent staff and monitored around 50,000 telecare connections.

In December 2021, Doro listed its Care assets in a separate company called Careium AB by distributing all shares in the wholly owned subsidiary Careium AB to the shareholders of Doro.

After the spin-off of the care assets into Careium AB, Doro AB is once again a consumer technology company focused on developing services and products for seniors to live independent and fulfilling lives.
