= Nokia 2720 Flip =

2019 mobile phone model

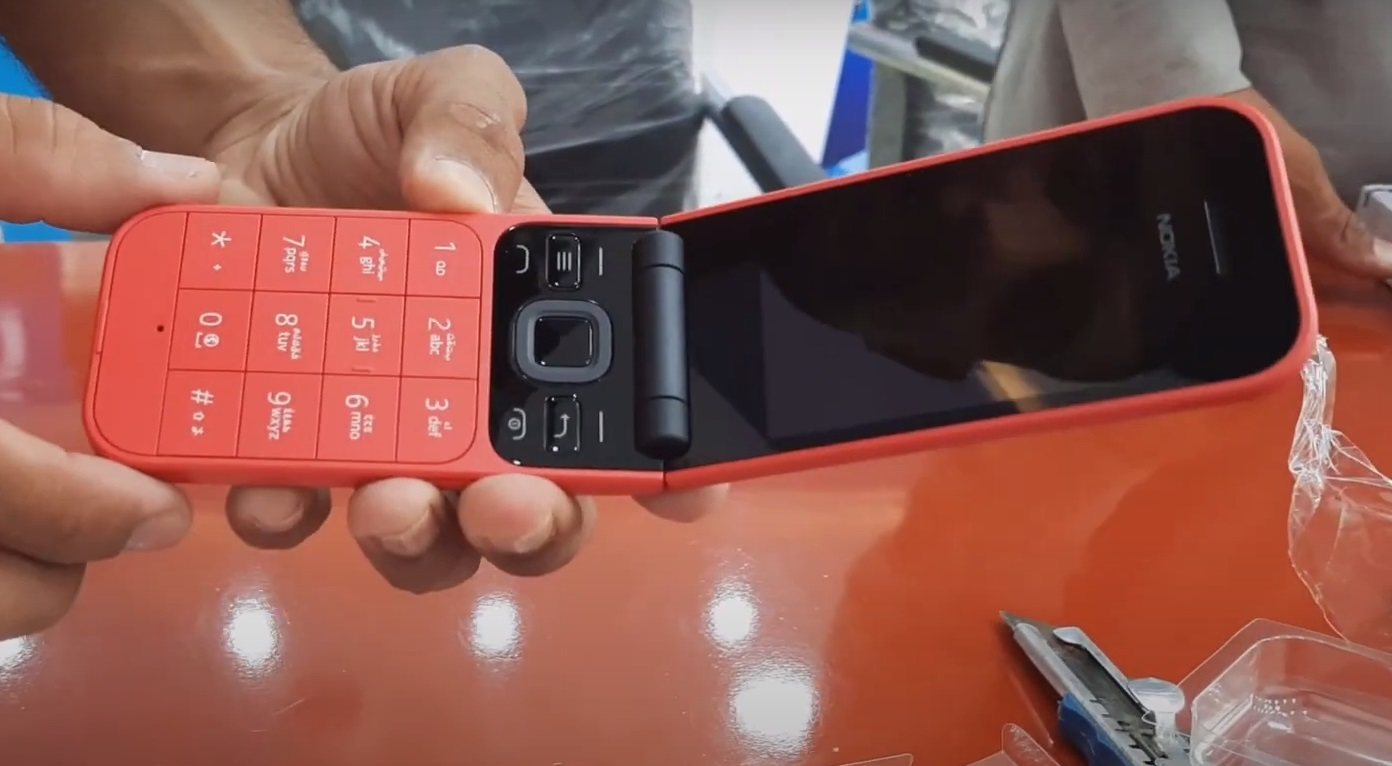
- Nokia 2720 Flip in red
- Brand: Nokia
- Developer: HMD Global
- Manufacturer: Foxconn
- First released: 5 September 2019; 7 years ago
- Predecessor: Nokia 2720 Fold
- Compatible networks: 4G LTE (150/50 Mbit/s)
- Dimensions: 192.7 mm (7.59 in) H 54.5 mm (2.15 in) W 11.6 mm (0.46 in) D
- Weight: 118 g (4.2 oz)
- Operating system: KaiOS (With HMD custom UI layer "Smart Feature OS" on top of it)
- System-on-chip: Qualcomm MSM8905 Snapdragon 205 (28 nm)
- CPU: Dual-core (2x1.1 GHz Cortex-A7)
- GPU: Adreno 304
- Memory: 512 MB LPDDR3 RAM
- Storage: 4 GB
- Removable storage: microSD, up to 32 GB
- SIM: Dual SIM
- Battery: Removable 1500 mAh (BL-6V)
- Rear camera: 2MP
- Display: 2.8" 240 X 320 pixels, 256k color TFT
- External display: 1.3", 240 X 240 pixels
- Connectivity: 3.5 mm TRRS headphone jack; Bluetooth 4.2 with A2DP, LE; WiFi 802.11 b/g/n, hotspot; A-GPS, GLONASS; FM radio; micro USB 2.0
- Website: www.hmd.com/en_int/nokia-2720-flip

The Nokia 2720 Flip is a Nokia-branded flip phone developed by HMD Global as part of the Nokia Originals line. It was unveiled at IFA 2019 (along with Nokia 110 (2019), Nokia 800 Tough, Nokia 6.2, and Nokia 7.2) and was created as an updated version of the Nokia 2720 Fold, which debuted in 2009. The 2720 Flip runs the KaiOS operating system and supports 4G LTE networks.

== Target audience ==
According to a 2019 article from The Verge, "If you’re seriously considering buying a feature phone like the Nokia 2720 Flip in 2019 then I think you’re likely to be one of three kinds of people. Either you live or work in the developing world, where smartphones sometimes aren’t a practical option, you’re the kind of person who thrives on nostalgia for a simpler time, or else you’re trying to do a “digital detox,” and decrease the amount of time you seem to waste staring at screens every day". This fits in with the general trend of modern flip-phones being seen as a less-harmful alternative to cell phones.

== Software ==
The Nokia 2720 Flip runs on the web-based operating system KaiOS. It runs many more modern apps including, but not limited to, Facebook, Google Assistant and YouTube.

== Reception ==
In February 2020, the Nokia 2720 Flip received an iF Design Award 2020 by iF International Forum Design.

== Variants and derivates ==
The Nokia 2720 V Flip is a Verizon specific model that otherwise has the same specifications as the global 2720 Flip. It was released in May 2021.

The Nokia 2760 Flip is a US-exclusive flip phone released in 2022. It takes its name from an older Nokia phone, the Nokia 2760. Compared to the 2720 Flip, the 2760 Flip has a revised design, runs the newer KaiOS 3.x OS and features an upgraded USB-C port, but it lacks a microSD slot and FM radio. The Nokia 2780 Flip is another model released in 2022 that includes both the card slot and the radio. HMD has also released another Nokia flip phone with a similar design to the 2760/2780, called the Nokia 2660 Flip, which is built on a Unisoc chip and runs Series 30+. Both of these models have also been turned into variants of the HMD Barbie Phone, while the Nokia 2760 has been adapted into variants of Heineken's The Boring Phone. In 2025, HMD released an improved version of the Nokia 2660 Flip, branded as the HMD 2660 Flip, featuring several cosmetic changes and features inspired by the HMD Barbie Phone.

== See also ==
- Nokia Originals
- Nokia 8110 4G
- Nokia 800 Tough
