= Nokia 5.3 =

Smartphone

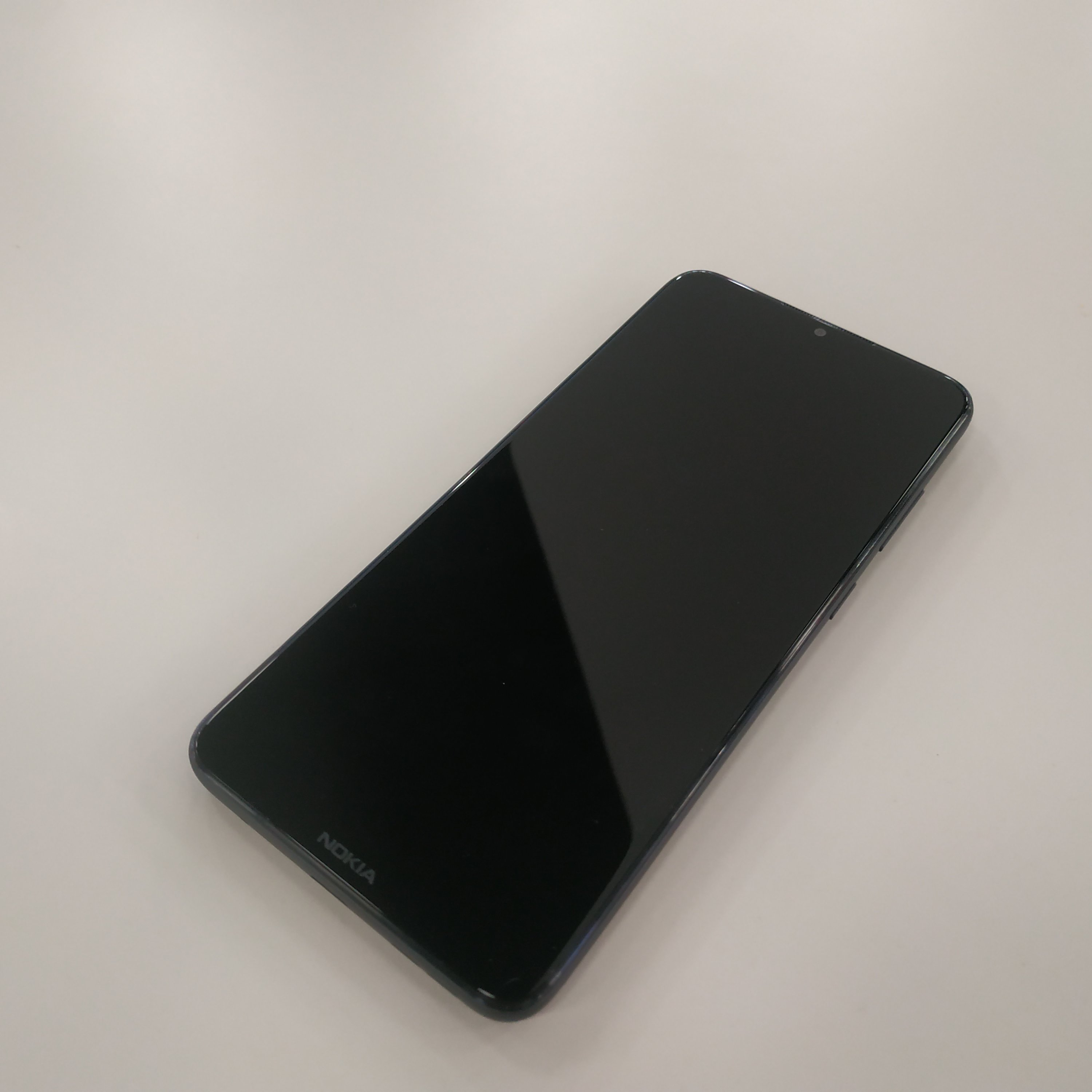
- Brand: Nokia
- Developer: HMD Global
- Manufacturer: Foxconn
- Type: Smartphone
- Predecessor: Nokia 5.1; Nokia 5.1 Plus
- Successor: Nokia 5.4
- Related: Nokia 1.3; Nokia 2.3; Nokia 8.3 5G
- Dimensions: 164.3×76.6×8.5 mm (6.47×3.02×0.33 in)
- Weight: 185 g (7 oz)
- Operating system: Original: Android 10; Current: Android 12
- System-on-chip: Qualcomm Snapdragon 665 (11 nm)
- CPU: Octa-core (4x2.0 GHz Kryo 260 Gold (ARM Cortex-A73 based) & 4x1.8 GHz Kryo 260 Silver (ARM Cortex-A53 based))
- GPU: Adreno 610
- Memory: 3, 4 or 6 GB
- Storage: 64 GB
- Removable storage: microSD, up to 512 GB
- Battery: 4000 mAH non-removable Li-ion
- Rear camera: 13 MP, f/1.8, (wide), PDAF; 5 MP, 13mm (ultrawide); 2 MP (macro); 2 MP (depth); LED flash, HDR, Panorama; Video: 4K@30fps, 1080p@30fps
- Front camera: 8 MP, f/2.0 (wide); Video: 1080p@30fps
- Display: 6.55" (16.63 cm) 20:9 720x1600p IPS LCD
- Website: www.hmd.com/en_int/nokia-5-3

The Nokia 5.3 is a Nokia-branded mid-range smartphone by HMD Global, running Android One. It was announced on March 19, 2020, alongside the Nokia 8.3 5G, Nokia 1.3 and Nokia 5310 (2020).

== Design ==
The Nokia 5.3 is powered by the Qualcomm Snapdragon 665 system-on-chip paired with 3, 4 or 6 GB of RAM depending on the variant. It has 64 GB of internal storage, which can be expanded with a MicroSD card. Depending on the variant, there is space for either a single NanoSIM or a Nano-SIM and another SIM in standby.

The phone weighs 185 g and is 8.5 mm thick. It has a dewdrop notch and bezels with a chin at the bottom with the Nokia logo. The Nokia 5.3, like the second series of Nokia Android phones, has a dedicated Google Assistant button on the left of the phone which can be pressed to quickly activate the Google Assistant or held and released for the Google Assistant to start and stop listening. The phone is sold in 3 colours — Cyan, Sand, and Charcoal.

In 2021, the Nokia 5.4 was released, featuring nearly identical specifications, with the exception of the new punch-hole front camera design.

== Reception ==
The Nokia 5.3 mostly received positive reviews. Radoslav Minkov of PhoneArena rated it at 7.8 out of 10 and praised the device's "smooth performance, impressive screen brightness and contrast, good portrait mode photos, and solid battery life" while criticizing the "low display resolution, unreliable fingerprint sensor and tinny speaker".

Damien Wilde of 9to5Google also praised the device for its "decent camera, reasonably good performance, and a build that is impressive at this price point", saying "It’s [a] sensibly priced smartphone that gives you a heck of a lot for your low entry price".

David Nield of TechRadar was more critical of the device, rating it 3.5 out of 5, but praised it, saying "Unsurprisingly given Nokia's track record, the Nokia 5.3 is a solid budget performer that offers good value for money. It's absolutely worth a place on your shortlist if you're looking for a new phone that covers the basics well without breaking the bank."

Andy Boxall of Digital Trends was critical of the camera and display, but praised the device for its screen size, battery life, having NFC functionality and software, rating it 3.5/5 and saying "The Nokia 5.3 delivers everyday performance, as well as future-proofed software, for a great price."
