= Nokia 1.3 =

Smartphone

- Brand: Nokia
- Developer: HMD Global
- Manufacturer: Foxconn
- Type: Smartphone
- Predecessor: Nokia 1 Plus
- Related: Nokia 5.3; Nokia 2.3
- Dimensions: 147.3×71.2×9.35 mm (5.799×2.803×0.368 in)
- Weight: 155 g (5 oz)
- Operating system: Original: Android 10; Upgradeable: Android 11; Current: Android 12
- System-on-chip: Qualcomm QM 215 (28 nm)
- CPU: Quad-core ARM Cortex-A53
- GPU: Adreno 308
- Memory: 1 GB
- Storage: 16 GB
- Removable storage: microSD, up to 400 GB
- Battery: 3000 mAH removable Li-ion
- Rear camera: 8 MP with AI low-light enhancement and LED flash
- Front camera: 5 MP
- Display: 5.71" (14.5 cm) 19:9 720x1520p IPS LCD
- Website: www.hmd.com/en_int/nokia-1-3

The Nokia 1.3 is a Nokia-branded smartphone by HMD Global, running Android Go. It was announced on March 19, 2020 alongside the Nokia 8.3 5G, Nokia 5.3 and Nokia 5310 (2020).

== Specifications ==
The Nokia 1.3 is powered by a Qualcomm 215 system-on-chip and 1 GB of RAM. It has 16 GB of internal storage, which can be expanded with a MicroSD card.

The phone weighs 155 g and is 9.35 mm thick. It has a dewdrop notch and bezels with a chin at the bottom with the Nokia logo. It has a glass front and a plastic frame. The Nokia 1.3, like the second series of Nokia phones, has a dedicated Google Assistant button on the left of the phone which can be pressed to quickly activate the Google Assistant. The phone is sold in 3 colours — Cyan, Charcoal and Sand.

== Reception ==
The Nokia 1.3 received mixed to positive reviews. Eric Ferrari-Herrmann of AndroidPIT praised the device’s "very good value for money, removable battery, and independent dual SIM and microSD slots" while criticising the "very basic processor performance and poor camera performance".

Tom Bruce of Expert Reviews also praised the device for its price, display and build quality, while criticising the battery life and performance.

Damien Wilde of 9to5Google also praised the device, saying "There are very few smartphones under $100 that we would actually recommend, but the Nokia 1.3 is one of our selected few."
