= Nokia 8.3 5G =

Android Smartphone

- Brand: Nokia
- Developer: HMD Global
- Manufacturer: Foxconn
- Type: Phablet
- Family: Nokia 8 Series
- First released: 15 September 2020; 5 years ago (Europe, Asia, other regions); 8 October 2020; 5 years ago (North America)
- Predecessor: Nokia 8.1
- Related: Nokia 1.3; Nokia 2.3; Nokia 5.3
- Dimensions: 171.9 mm × 78.6 mm × 9 mm (6.77 in × 3.09 in × 0.35 in)
- Weight: 220 g (7.8 oz)
- Operating system: Android 10, upgradable to Android 12 (Android One)
- System-on-chip: Qualcomm Snapdragon 765G (7 nm)
- CPU: Octa-core (1x2.4 GHz Kryo 475 Prime & 1x2.2 GHz Kryo 475 Gold & 6x1.8 GHz Kryo 475 Silver)
- GPU: Adreno 620
- Memory: 6 or 8 GB LPDDR4X RAM
- Storage: 64 or 128 GB
- Removable storage: microSD, up to 512 GB
- Battery: 4500 mAh Li-Po, non-removable
- Rear camera: Quad Camera Set-up: 64 MP (f/1.9, 1/1.72", 0.8 μm, PDAF) Wide; 12 MP (f/2.2, 120˚, 1/2.43", 1.4 μm, autofocus) Ultrawide; 2 MP Macro; 2 MP Depth; ZEISS optics, Dual-LED flash, panorama, HDR; Video: 4K@30/60fps, 1080p@30/240fps, 720p@960fps, gyro-EIS
- Front camera: 24 MP (f/2.0, 1/2.8", 0.9 μm) Wide; ZEISS optics, HDR; Video: 1080p@30fps
- Display: 6.81 in (17.3 cm) (112.0 cm^{2}) 1080p FHD+ IPS LCD, ~386 ppi pixel density
- Sound: Nokia OZO 360° audio (For Recording Video Only)
- Connectivity: 3.5 mm TRRS headphone jack; Bluetooth 5.0; USB 2.0 via USB-C port; NFC
- Data inputs: Sensors: Fingerprint scanner (side-mounted); Accelerometer; Gyroscope; Proximity sensor; Electronic compass
- Website: www.hmd.com/en_int/nokia-8-3-5g

The Nokia 8.3 5G is a Nokia-branded smartphone released by HMD Global, running the Android One variant of Android. It is HMD's first 5G phone, and was announced on 19 March 2020 alongside the Nokia 5.3, Nokia 1.3, and Nokia 5310 (2020). The Nokia 8.3 5G is claimed by HMD executive Juho Sarvikas to be the first smartphone, which is compatible with every 5G network, operational as of its announcement. It was released in September 2020.

== Design and specifications ==
The Nokia 8.3 5G is powered by the Qualcomm Snapdragon 765G system-on-chip (SoC). Depending on model, it has either 6 or 8 GB of RAM, and 64 or 128 GB of internal storage, which can be expanded with a microSD card, up to 512 GB. In the dual-SIM model, there is space for two nano-SIMs and a microSD card.

The phone weighs 220 g and is 9 mm thick, which is comparable with the Nokia Lumia 1320 and the Lumia 1520, introduced in 2013. It has a 6.81" FHD+ IPS LCD screen with 'PureDisplay' technology, a 24 MP punch hole camera and a chin at the bottom with the Nokia logo.

The Nokia 8.3 5G has a quad-camera system with ZEISS optics, consisting of a 64 MP rear camera, a 12 MP ultra-wide camera, a 2 MP macro camera, and a 2 MP depth camera. The 8.3 5G is the second Nokia Android smartphone to be advertised with a 'PureView' camera, after the Nokia 9 PureView.

== Nokia 8V 5G UW ==
In March 2020, Nokia released a Verizon carrier-locked version of this phone called the Nokia 8V 5G UW. It is identical to the Nokia 8.3 except that it is Verizon locked and is not an Android One smartphone. It also is locked to Android 10 and cannot receive updates. Following the expiration of the contract and release of unlocked Verizon-compatible Nokia phones, the price has been significantly reduced.

== James Bond film ==
The James Bond film No Time to Die product placement includes the Nokia 8.3 5G.
