= Nokia 1 Plus =

Mobile phone by Nokia

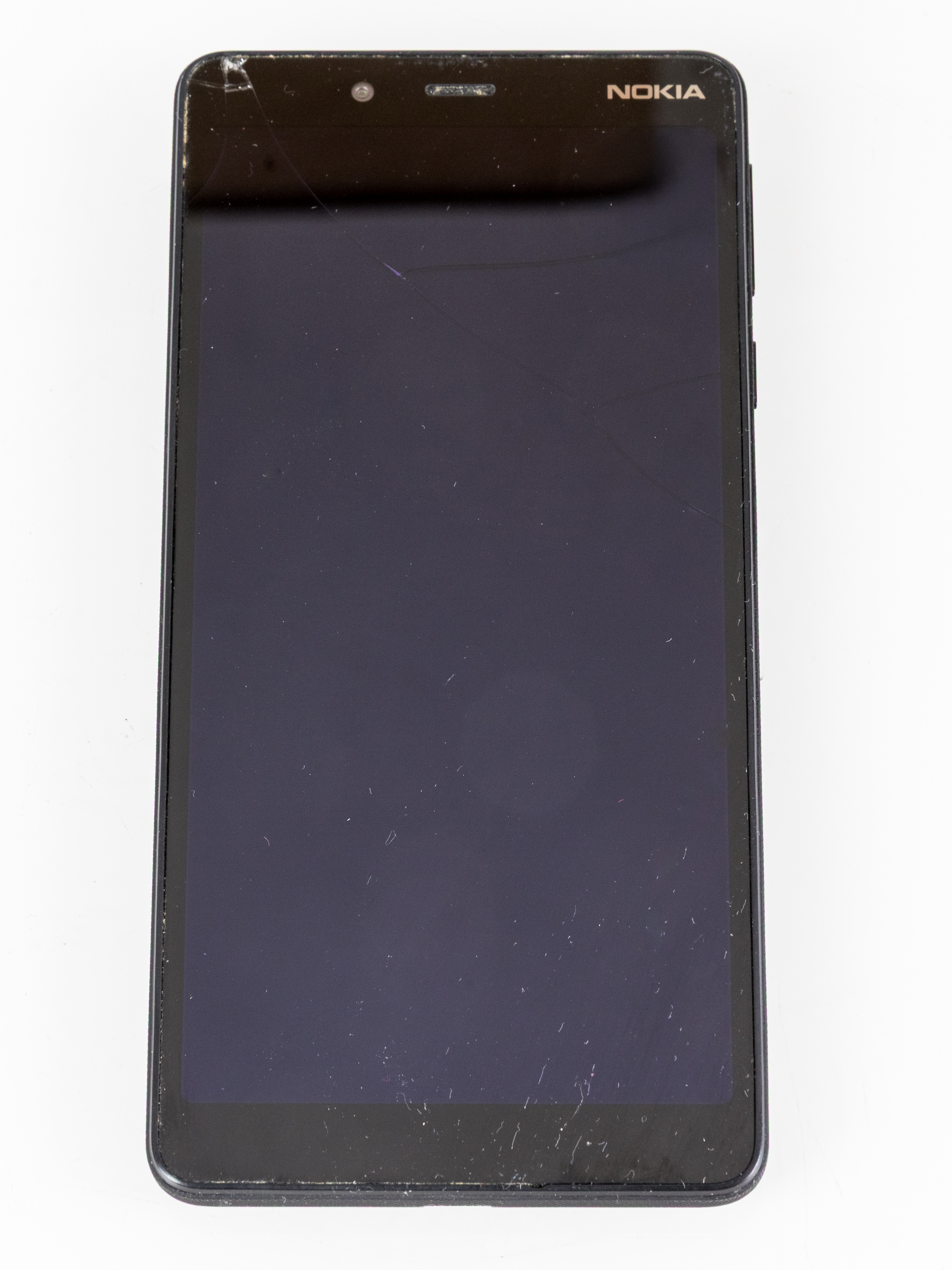
- Brand: Nokia
- Developer: HMD Global
- Manufacturer: Foxconn
- Type: Smartphone
- Predecessor: Nokia 1
- Successor: Nokia 1.3
- Related: Nokia 2.1; Nokia 3.1; Nokia 5.1; Nokia 6.1; Nokia 7.1; Nokia 7 Plus; Nokia 8.1; Nokia 8 Sirocco; Nokia 9 PureView
- Compatible networks: GSM 850, 900, 1800, 1900; WCDMA 1, 5, 8 LTE Cat. 4 channels 1, 3, 5, 7, 8, 20, 28, 38, 40; 150 Mbps down, 50 Mbps up. VoLTE
- Form factor: Slate
- Dimensions: 145.04×70.4×8.55 mm (5.710×2.772×0.337 in) (h/w/d)
- Operating system: Original: Android 9 "Pie" (Android Go); Current: Android 11
- System-on-chip: MediaTek MT6739WW
- CPU: Quad-core 1.5 GHz ARM Cortex-A53 on ARMv8 architecture
- Memory: 1 GB LPDDR3 RAM
- Storage: 8 GB eMMC
- Battery: User-removable, 2500 mAh
- Rear camera: 8 MP auto-focus with flash
- Front camera: 5 MP
- Display: 5.45" FWVGA+ IPS(480x960); 18:9 aspect ratio 197 ppi
- Sound: 3.5 mm audio jack FM radio
- Connectivity: MicroUSB 2.0; Wi-Fi: 802.11a/b/g/n Bluetooth 4.2; Positioning: GPS/AGPS, GLONASS, cellular and Wi-Fi-based
- Data inputs: Touchscreen with home, back, and recent soft keys; power and volume up/down buttons. Accelerometer, proximity, and ambient light sensors
- Website: www.hmd.com/en_int/nokia-1-plus

The Nokia 1 Plus (also known as Nokia 1.1) is a Nokia-branded budget Android Go smartphone launched in 2019 as the successor to the Nokia 1.

== Specifications ==
The Nokia 1 Plus runs the Android Go edition of Android Pie. It has a MediaTek MT6739WW System-on-chip with 1 GB of RAM and 8 GB internal memory. The device has a 5MP front camera and an 8MP rear camera with a flash.

== Reception ==
The Nokia 1 Plus received mixed to positive reviews, with David Lumb of TechRadar praising the device's "decent specs for the price and durable removable cover" while criticising the "poor performance and storage".
