= HMD Barbie Phone =

2024 mobile phone model

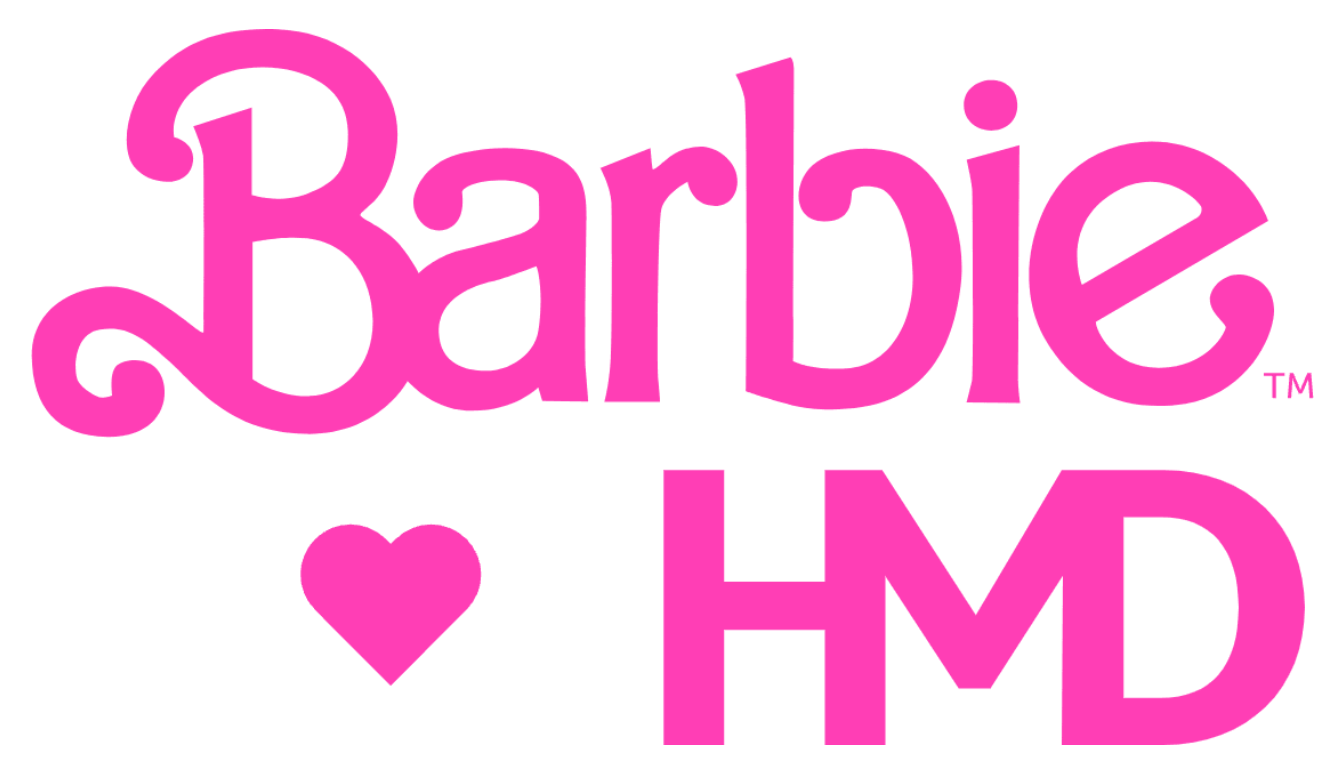

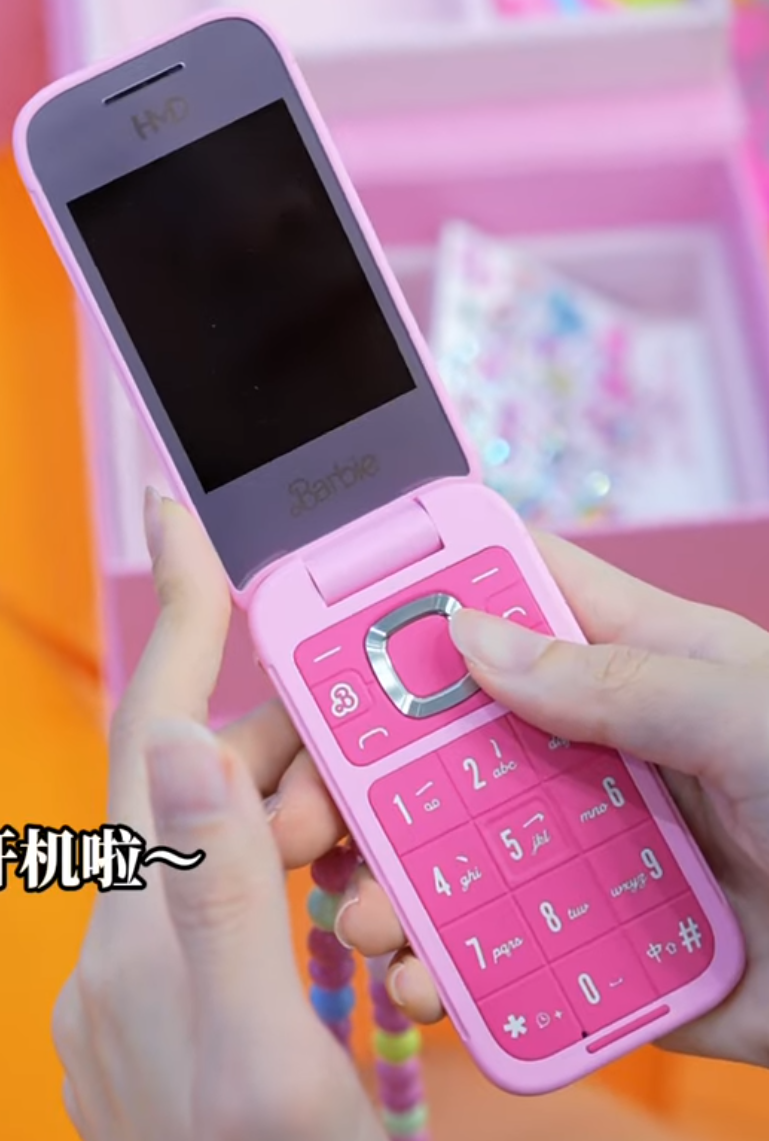
- Brand: HMD
- Developer: HMD Global
- Manufacturer: Foxconn
- Type: Feature phone
- First released: August 2024
- Compatible networks: GSM GPRS EDGE 4G LTE
- Dimensions: H: 201 mm (7.9 in); W: 55.1 mm (2.17 in); D: 10.9 mm (0.43 in) (unfolded)
- Weight: 123.5 g (4.36 oz)
- Operating system: Mocor OS (Series 30+ UI); KaiOS (Smart Feature OS UI)
- System-on-chip: Unisoc T107 (international version); Qualcomm QM215 Snapdragon 215 (USA version)
- Removable storage: microSD, up to 32 GB
- Battery: 1450 mAh Li-ion, removable
- Display: 71 mm (2.8 in) 240 x 320 QVGA TFT
- Connectivity: 3.5 mm headphone jack; Bluetooth 5.0; FM radio, Stereo; USB-C
- Data inputs: Keypad

HMD Barbie Phone is a mobile phone developed by HMD Global in collaboration with Mattel as a Barbie-themed flip phone. It was released in some territories as early as 28 August 2024. In the US, it started shipping on 1 October 2024. There are two distinct versions of the phone: one for the international market that is based on the Nokia 2660 Flip and a different one for the US market based on Nokia 2780 Flip which has improved specifications.

== Features ==
The Barbie Phone has a 71 mm (2.8 in) display as well as a 45 mm (1.77 in) external display that displays the clock on top of a glossy exterior. The design is based on the Nokia 2660 Flip but heavily modified to fit the Barbie theme. Barbie symbols are shown when the keypad lights are illuminated. The user interface is also customised with a Barbie theme.

It has basic essentials as expected from a feature phone such as a torch, calculator, alarm and calendar. It also has a wireless FM radio receiver (i.e. it has a built in antenna and does not require headphones). The phone also comes with a special Malibu themed version of Nokia's Snake game.

The global version of the HMD Barbie Phone has a Unisoc chip and runs Series 30+. On the other hand, the US version is built on a Qualcomm Snapdragon chip and runs KaiOS (version 3.1). As a result, the American version has a number of additional capabilities such as Wi-Fi and GPS as well as access to downloadable KaiOS software. This version also has a better, 5 megapixel camera compared to the 0.3 megapixel lens on the global version.

== Marketing ==
To market to Barbie fans, the phone comes with a number of additional accessories in box and all are coloured pink including the charging cable. As with a number of other HMD and Nokia branded feature phones, "digital detox" has been cited as a marketing point, and the phone. In addition, nostalgia for the 2000s has been used by HMD Global for marketing the phone.

== Reception ==
Tech Advisor rated the Barbie Phone poorly, thinking that the design and accessories are fun but being critical of the camera, keypad and screen. PC Mag gave a more positive review and praised the design and the amount of included Barbie accessories.

== See also ==
- Nokia 2660 Flip
- Nokia 2720 Flip
