= Jio =

Indian multinational telecommunications company

Reliance Jio Infocomm Limited

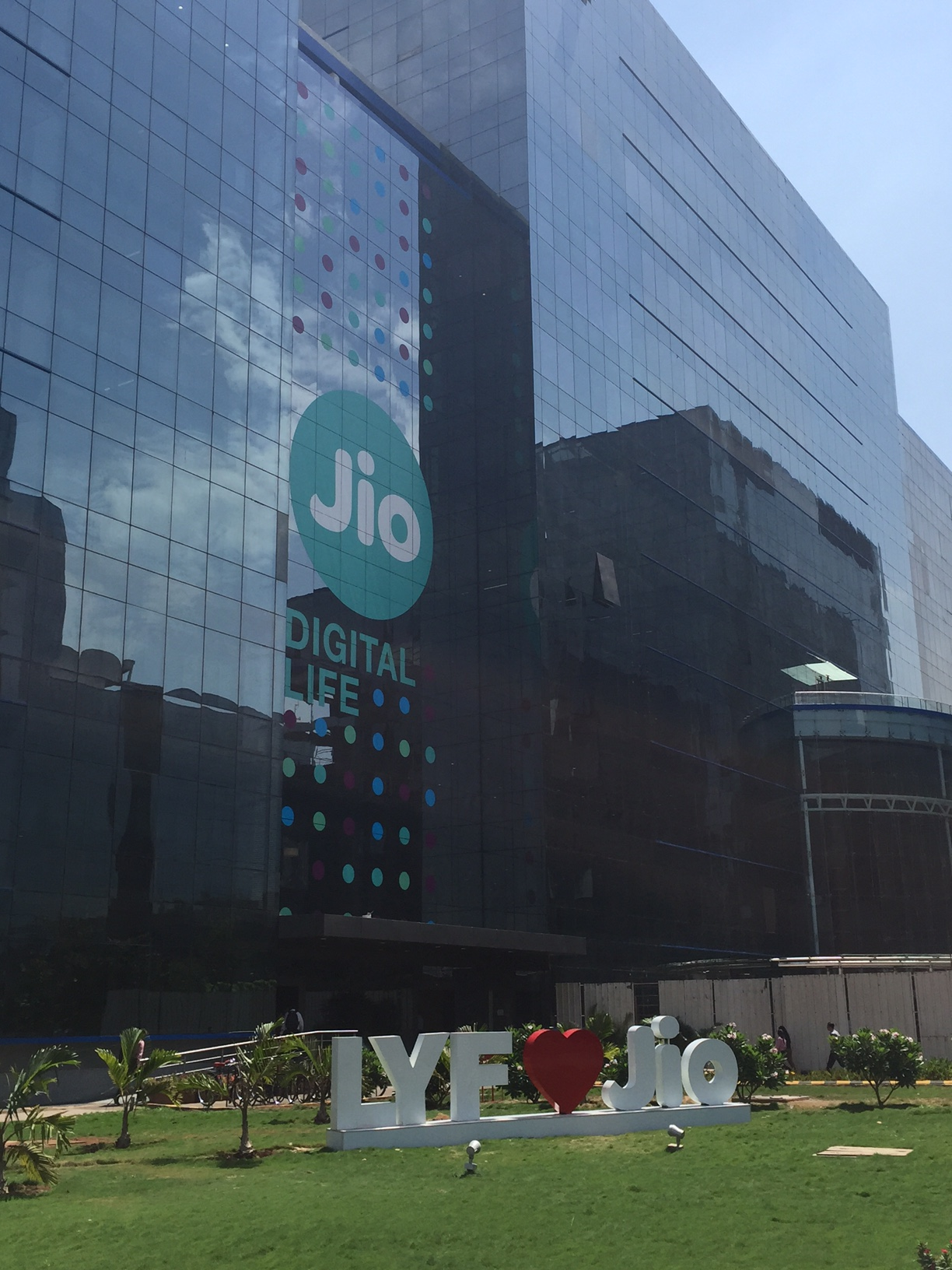
- Headquarters in Reliance Corporate Park, Navi Mumbai
- Trade name: Jio
- Type: Public
- Industry: Telecommunications
- Founded: 15 February 2007; 19 years ago
- Founder: Mukesh Ambani
- Headquarters: Reliance Corporate Park, Ghansoli, Navi Mumbai, Maharashtra, India
- Area served: India
- Key people: Akash Ambani (Chairman); Isha Ambani (Managing Director)
- Products: Landline; Fixed-line telephone; Mobile telephony; Wireless broadband; Internet services; Mobile phones; OTT services
- Revenue: ▲₹149,759 crore (US$16 billion) (FY 25-26)
- Operating income: ▲₹40,353 crore (US$4.3 billion) (FY 25-26)
- Net income: ▲₹30,053 crore (US$3.2 billion) (FY 25-26)
- Total assets: ▲₹615,594 crore (US$66 billion) (As of 31 Mar 26)
- Total equity: ▲₹337,076 crore (US$36 billion) (As of 31 Mar 26)
- Owner: Reliance Industries
- Members: ▲52.4 crore (524 million) (June 2026)
- Parent: Jio Platforms
- Subsidiaries: LYF
- Website: jio.com

Reliance Jio Infocomm Limited (d/b/a Jio) is an Indian telecommunications company, a subsidiary of Jio Platforms. The company is headquartered in Navi Mumbai. It operates a national LTE network with coverage across all 22 telecom circles. Jio offers 4G, 4G+ and 5G NR services all over India. Its 6G service is in the works.

Jio was soft launched on 27 December 2015 with a beta for partners and employees, and became publicly available on 5 September 2016. It is the largest mobile network operator in India and the third largest mobile network operator in the world with over 52.4 crore (524 million) subscribers.

== History ==
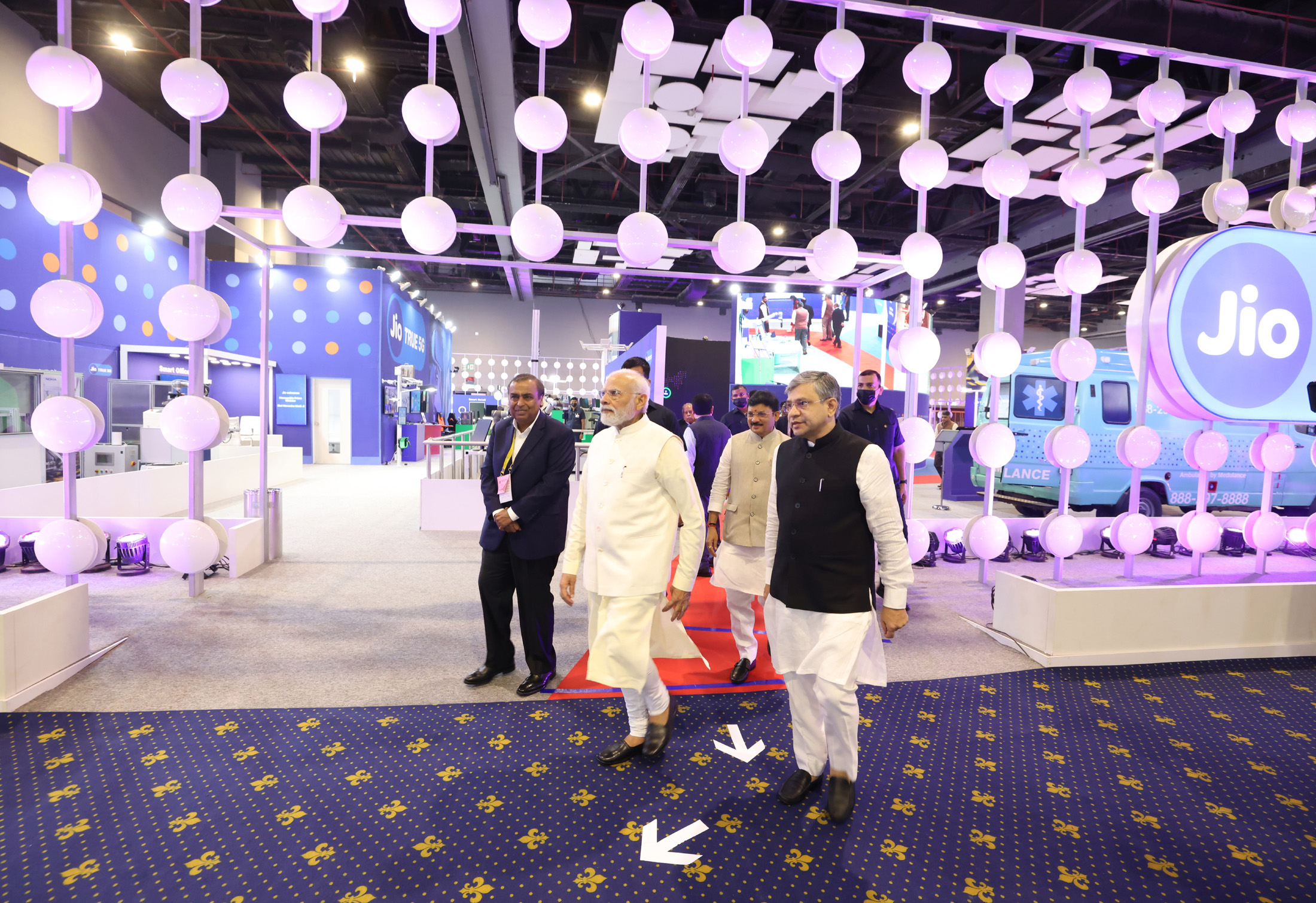
Prime Minister Narendra Modi visits the stall of Jio with Ashwini Vaishnaw, Minister of Railways and Communications along with Mukesh Ambani and Akash Ambani on October 1, 2022.

The company was registered in Ambawadi, Ahmedabad, Gujarat, on 15 February 2007 as Infotel Broadband Services Limited (IBSL). In June 2010, Reliance Industries (RIL) bought a 95% stake in IBSL for ₹4,800 crore (US$510 million). Although unlisted, IBSL was the only company that won broadband spectrum in all 22 circles in India in the 4G auction that took place earlier that year. Later continuing as RIL's telecom subsidiary, Infotel Broadband Services Limited was renamed as Reliance Jio Infocomm Limited (RJIL) in January 2013.

In June 2015, Jio announced that it would start its operations throughout the country by the end of 2015. However, four months later in October, the company postponed the launch to the first quarter of the financial year 2016–2017.

Later, in July 2015, a PIL filed in the Supreme Court by an NGO called the Centre for Public Interest Litigation, through Prashant Bhushan, challenged the grant of a pan-India license to Jio by the Government of India. The PIL also alleged that the firm was being allowed to provide voice telephony along with its 4G data service, by paying an additional fee of just ₹165.8 crore (US$18 million) which was arbitrary and unreasonable, and contributed to a loss of ₹2,284.2 crore (US$240 million) to the exchequer. The Indian Department of Telecommunications (DoT), however, explained that the rules for 3G and BWA spectrum didn't restrict BWA winners from providing voice telephony. As a result, the PIL was revoked, and the accusations were dismissed.

The 4G services were launched internally on 27 December 2015. The company commercially launched its 4G services on 5 September 2016, offering free data and voice services until 31 December, which was later extended until 31 March 2017. Within the first month, Jio announced that it had acquired 1.6 crore (16 million) subscribers and has crossed 5 crore (50 million) subscriber mark in 83 days since its launch, subsequently crossing 100 million subscribers on 22 February 2017. By October 2017, it had about 13 crore (130 million) subscribers.

On 5 October 2022, it has launched 5G services to Delhi, Mumbai, Kolkata and Chennai. As of March 2023, Jio 5G service was available in 365 cities across India. As of April 2023, 5G service was available across 2,500+ cities in India. In August 2023, it was announced that Jio had completed its rollout of 5G services nationwide, ahead of schedule.

== Network ==
=== Spectrum frequency holding summary ===
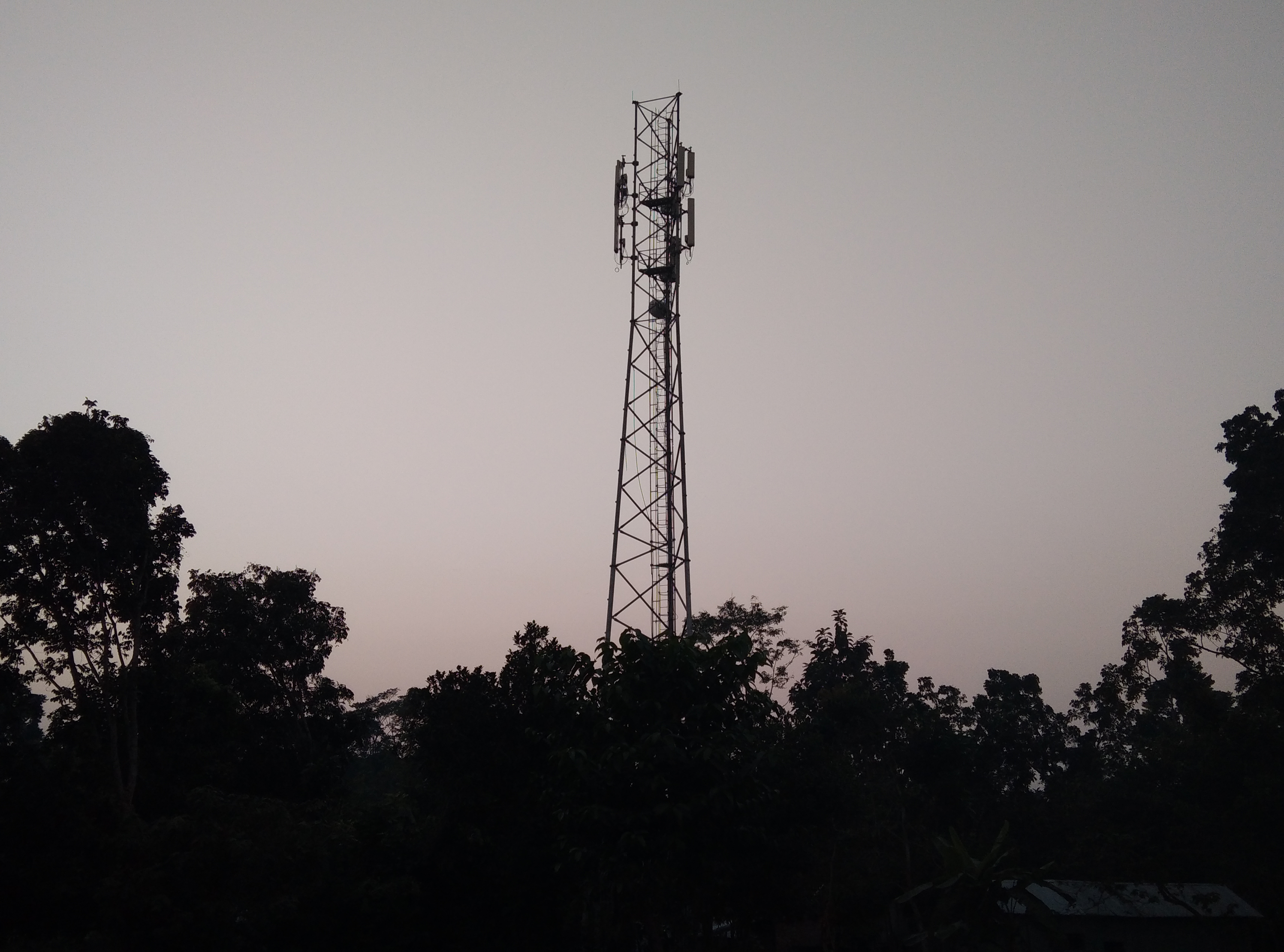
A cell tower carrying antennas of Jio cellular network in West Bengal, India

Jio owns spectrum in 850 MHz and 1,800 MHz bands in India's 22 circles, and also owns pan-India licensed 2,300 MHz spectrum. The spectrum is valid until 2035. Jio also picked up pan-India licenses in the 700 MHz, 3,500 MHz and 26 GHz spectrum bands in the DoT's 2022 5G auction.

Telecom circle coverage	FD-NR 700MHz Band n28	FD-LTE 850MHz Band 5	FD-LTE 1800MHz Band 3	TD-LTE 2300MHz Band 40	TD-NR 3500MHz Band n78	TD-NR 26GHz Band n258
Delhi	Yes	Yes	Yes	Yes	Yes	Yes
Mumbai	Yes	Yes	Yes	Yes	Yes	Yes
Kolkata	Yes	Yes	Yes	Yes	Yes	Yes
Andhra Pradesh & Telangana	Yes	Yes	Yes	Yes	Yes	Yes
Gujarat	Yes	Yes	Yes	Yes	Yes	Yes
Karnataka	Yes	Yes	Yes	Yes	Yes	Yes
Maharashtra & Goa	Yes	Yes	Yes	Yes	Yes	Yes
Tamil Nadu	Yes	Yes	Yes	Yes	Yes	Yes
Haryana	Yes	Yes	Yes	Yes	Yes	Yes
Kerala	Yes	Yes	Yes	Yes	Yes	Yes
Madhya Pradesh & Chhattisgarh	Yes	Yes	Yes	Yes	Yes	Yes
Punjab	Yes	Yes	Yes	Yes	Yes	Yes
Rajasthan	Yes	Yes	Yes	Yes	Yes	Yes
Uttar Pradesh (East)	Yes	Yes	Yes	Yes	Yes	Yes
Uttar Pradesh (West)	Yes	Yes	Yes	Yes	Yes	Yes
West Bengal	Yes	Yes	Yes	Yes	Yes	Yes
Assam	Yes	Yes	Yes	Yes	Yes	Yes
Bihar & Jharkhand	Yes	Yes	Yes	Yes	Yes	Yes
Himachal Pradesh	Yes	Yes	Yes	Yes	Yes	Yes
Jammu and Kashmir & Ladakh	Yes	Yes	Yes	Yes	Yes	Yes
North East	Yes	Yes	Yes	Yes	Yes	Yes
Odisha	Yes	Yes	Yes	Yes	Yes	Yes

=== Partnerships ===
Logo of Jio True 5G

Jio shares spectrum with Reliance Communications. The sharing deal is for 800 MHz band across seven circles other than the 10 circles for which Jio already owns.

Sep 2014 – Acquired undisclosed stake in Airspan Networks for US$5 mn. Deploys Airspan's small cells throughout the network roll out phase.

Sep 2016 – Jio signed a pact with BSNL for intra-circle roaming which would enable users of the operators to use each other's 4G and 2G spectrum in national roaming mode.

Feb 2017 – Jio announced a partnership with Samsung to work on LTE – Advanced Pro and 5G.

Feb 2017 – Partnered with Ciena to deploy transport SDN architecture.

Reliance Jio also partnered with several OSS (Operations Support Systems) & BSS (Business Support System) companies for the deployment of services, like: SAP, HP, IBM, Ericsson, Rancore, Estel Technologies, Subex and Intec Telecom Systems. However, the finalized OSS firms were Ericsson, HP and Friendly Technologies.

Sep 2020 – Partners with Cisco Systems for 5G deployment.

Sep 2020 – Announces partnership with HFCL to deploy Fiber-optic communication to support the rollout of FTTx services.

Oct 2022 – Contracts with Nokia & Ericsson for supplying standalone 5G network equipment.

Jio and Gemini Partnership:

On 29 August 2024, Reliance Jio announced a strategic partnership with Google during Reliance Industries' 47th AGM to drive AI adoption across India under its "AI Everywhere for Everyone" vision. As part of this collaboration, Jio introduced the "Jio AI-Cloud Welcome Offer" starting Diwali 2024, granting eligible unlimited 5G and JioAirFiber subscribers up to 18 months of complimentary access to Google One AI Premium. The package includes Google Gemini Advanced model (Gemini 3.5 Pro), AI writing and drafting tools within Google Workspace, and 2 TB of secure cloud storage to make generative AI widely accessible without extra subscription costs.

=== Summit Digitel Infrastructure ===
Summit Digitel Infrastructure (formerly known as Reliance Jio Infratel Private Limited) operates 136,000 telecom sites. This division has been divested to Tower Infrastructure Trust, which is owned by Brookfield Asset Management, for a consideration of ₹25,215 crore (US$2.7 billion) in September 2020.

== Products and services ==
=== Mobile broadband ===
The company launched its 4G broadband services throughout India in September 2016. It was slated to be released in December 2015 after some reports said that the company was waiting to receive final permits from the government. Jio offers fourth-generation (4G) data and voice services, along with peripheral services like instant messaging and streaming movies and music. On 5 October 2022, it launched 5G services to Delhi, Mumbai, Kolkata, Chennai, Varanasi, Siliguri, Bangalore, Hyderabad and Nagpur.

=== JioFiber ===
In August 2018, Jio began to test a new triple play fiber to the home service known tentatively as Jio GigaFiber, including broadband internet with speeds ranging from 100 to 1000 Mbit/s, as well as television and landline telephone services.

In August 2019, it was announced that the service would officially launch on 5 September 2019 as JioFiber, in honour of the company's third anniversary. Jio also announced plans to offer streaming of films still in theatres ("First Day First Show") to eligible JioFiber subscribers.

In the year 2015, the company has a network of more than 250,000 km (160,000 mi) of fiber optic cables in the country, over which it will be partnering with local cable operators to get broader connectivity for its broadband services.

=== JioBusiness ===
In March 2021, the company launched connectivity solutions for businesses bundled with services provided by Jio Platforms, Reliance Retail, and Office 365.

=== JioAirFiber ===
In August 2023, in the Reliance AGM, the chairman of Reliance announced that the JioAirFiber eliminates the need for the last mile fiber cable connectivity by making use of the Jio 5G wireless network, and the product was made available for purchase from 19 September 2023.

The company has started installing JioAirFiber devices from 1 October 2023.

=== Jio SpaceFiber ===
On 27 October 2023, Jio launched its satellite-based GigaFiber internet service in India.

=== Jio Branded Devices ===
==== LYF smartphones ====
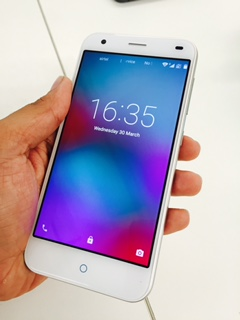
An image of LYF Water 2 phone with IPS display

In June 2015, Jio entered into an agreement with domestic handset maker Intex to supply 4G handsets capable of voice over LTE (VoLTE). However, in October 2015, Jio announced that it would be launching its own mobile handset brand named LYF.

On 25 January 2016, the company launched its LYF smartphone series starting with Water 1, through its chain of electronic retail outlets, Reliance Retail. Three more handset models have been released so far, namely Water 2, Earth 1, and Flame 1.

==== Jio Phone ====
Illustration of a JioPhone

JioPhone is a line of feature phones marketed by Jio. The first model, released in August 2017 (with public pre-orders beginning 24 August 2017), was positioned as an "affordable" LTE-compatible feature phone. It runs on the KaiOS platform (derived from the defunct Firefox OS), and includes a 2.4-inch display, a dual-core processor, 4 GB of internal storage, near-field communication support, a suite of Jio-branded apps (including the voice assistant HelloJio), and a Jio-branded application store. It also supports a "TV cable" accessory for output to an external display.

In July 2018, the company unveiled the JioPhone 2, an updated model in a keyboard bar form factor with a QWERTY keyboard and horizontal display. Jio also announced that Facebook, WhatsApp, and YouTube apps would become available for the two phones.

==== JioPhone Next ====
The JioPhone Next is a fully-featured Android smartphone co-developed with Google as part of Jio's long-term partnership. It was announced on 24 June 2021, by Mukesh Ambani. The budget smartphone was launched in India on 4 November 2021.

The JioPhone Next will be run by the indigenously built Pragati OS based on the Android Go operating system. This phone is classified as an entry-level phone and is aimed at replacing feature phones and providing basic smartphone services efficiently at low specifications.

==== Jio Bharat ====
Reliance Jio has introduced a budget-friendly 4G phone called Jio Bharat at an affordable price of ₹999. The phone's sales commenced on 7 July 2023, and Reliance Jio aims to eliminate 2G technology from India through the widespread adoption of this device. The Jio Bharat Phone is specifically targeted towards individuals who are unable to afford expensive smartphones but still rely on basic features.

==== JioFi ====
JioFi is a portable broadband device brought by Reliance Digital. The JioFi device allows multiple users and mobile devices to access Jio's 4G high-speed internet connectivity and create a personal Wi-Fi hotspot.

==== JioDive ====
Reliance Jio has unveiled its JioDive virtual reality (VR) headset in India, to help IPL fans watch a match in 360-degree stadium view while sitting in front of a 100-inch screen. A smartphone-based virtual reality headset for entertainment, learning, gaming, and wellness.

==== JioTag ====
JioTag, an affordable object tracker, was introduced by Reliance Jio in India. By utilizing Bluetooth 5.1 technology and the JioThings app, JioTag assists in locating lost items and alerts you when you inadvertently leave your connected device behind.

JioTag Air

This tracking device was launched in July 2024 by Reliance Jio, as a successor to JioTag. It features Bluetooth 5.3 technology. It supports both iOS (iOS 14 and above) and Android (version 9 and above) platforms.

=== Jionet Wi-Fi ===
Prior to its pan-India launch of 4G data and telephony services, the firm has started providing free Wi-Fi hotspot services in cities throughout India including Surat, Ahmedabad in Gujarat, and Visakhapatnam in Andhra Pradesh, Indore, Jabalpur, Dewas and Ujjain in Madhya Pradesh, select locations of Mumbai in Maharashtra, Kolkata in West Bengal, Lucknow in Uttar Pradesh, Bhubaneswar in Odisha, Mussoorie in Uttarakhand, Collectorate's Office in Meerut, and at MG Road in Vijayawada among others.

In March 2016, Jio started providing free Wi-Fi internet to spectators at six cricket stadiums hosting the 2016 ICC World Twenty20 matches.

== Jio apps ==
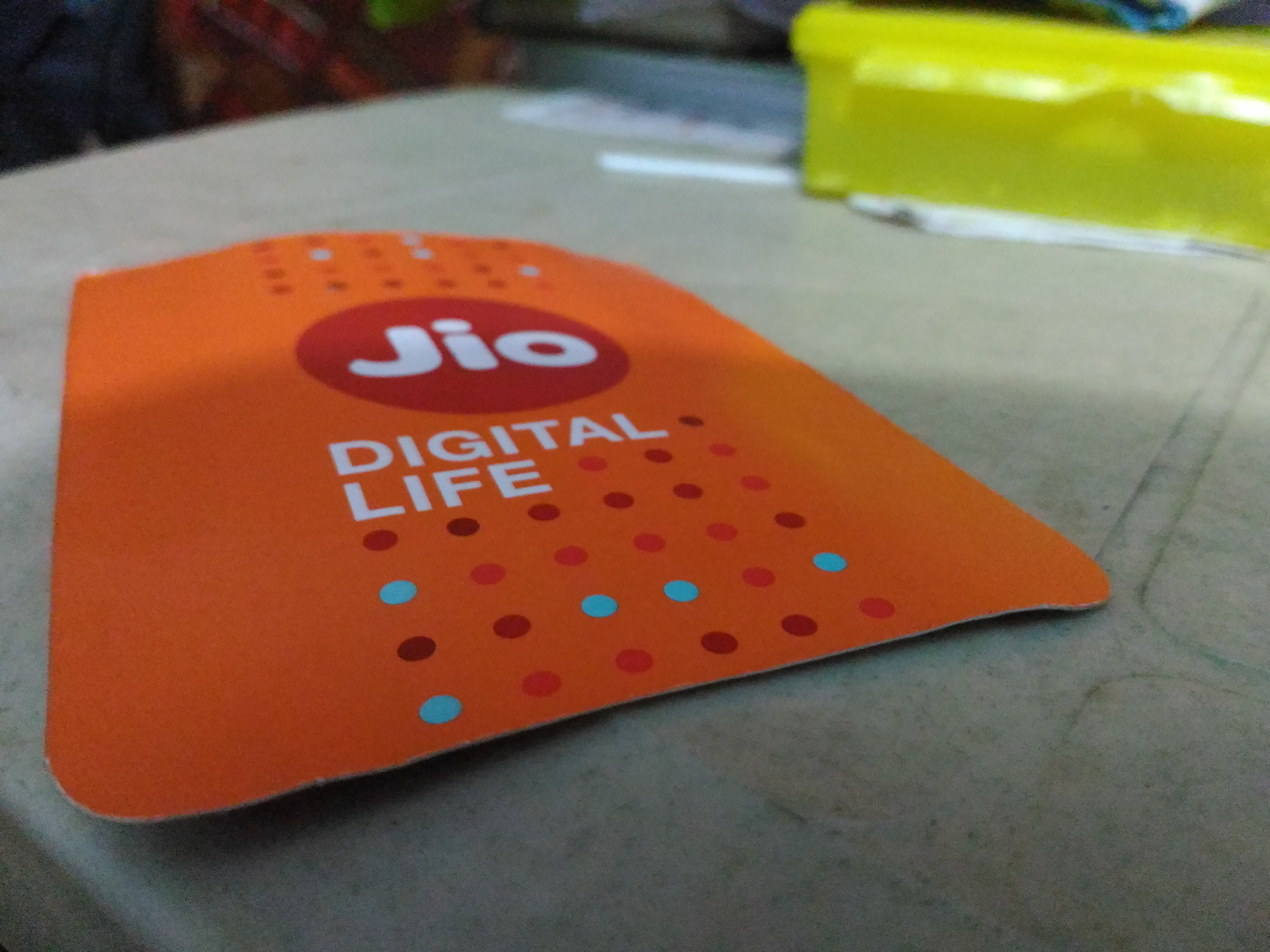
Jio SIM card pouch as distributed by Reliance Jio Infocomm

In May 2016, Jio launched a bundle of multimedia apps on Google Play as part of its upcoming 4G services. While the apps are available to download for everyone, a user will require a Jio SIM card to use some of them. Notable apps include:

- MyJio – manage Jio account and digital services associated with it
- JioSphere (formerly JioPages) – a web browser for Android device with VPN
- JioChat – instant messaging app
- JioCloud – cloud-based backup tool
- JioHealthHub – health services app
- JioNews – e-reader for news
- JioMeet – video-conferencing platform
- JioMoney – online payments/wallet app
- JioSaavn – for online and offline music streaming in English and Indian languages
- JioTV – TV Channels streaming service
- JioCall – VoLTE phone simulator
- JioMart – online shopping app
- JioGames – gaming platform
- JioHome – home entertainment
- JioThings – device tracking
- JioGate – housing society solutions
- JioPOS Lite – platform for partners to earn

== Controversies ==
=== Issue with incumbents ===
In September 2016, the Telecom Regulatory Authority of India (TRAI) summoned Jio and the country's existing telecom operators like Airtel, Vodafone, and Idea Cellular to meet and discuss an issue regarding the interconnection between the operators. This was a result of Jio complaining to TRAI and Department of Telecom (DoT) about other operators not honoring their commercial agreements to let Jio use their network resources. The company further added that the operators are trying to sabotage its entry into the telecom scene. However, DoT dismissed the request and directed TRAI to help settle the dispute amicably. Moreover, the Cellular Operators Association of India (COAI) requested TRAI to include all the operators in the discussion instead of the three.

The incumbent operators had previously approached the country's PMO to reiterate their stance that they "are in no way obliged or in any position to entertain Jio's requests for interconnection points as they do not have either the network or the financial resources to terminate the latter's humongous volumes of potentially asymmetric voice traffic." Responding to this, Mukesh Ambani, owner of Jio, said, "All operators have publicly said last week that they will provide this (interconnect and MNP). So, we are waiting. These are all great companies. They have their own reputations to protect. I am confident they won't violate the law." Commenting about number portability, he added, "The number belongs to the consumer. No operator can cause trouble if they want to change operators." However, on 12 September 2016, Idea Cellular agreed to allow Jio to use 196 of its interconnection access points.

=== Subscriber data breach ===
On 10 July 2017, Jio's customer data was allegedly leaked on the website magicapk.com. The website was suspended shortly after the news of the breach broke out.

=== Farmers' boycott ===
During the 2020–2021 Indian Farmers' Protest, farmers across multiple states in northern part of India boycotted and vandalized Jio's towers owing to allegations of Reliance Industries's support to controversial farm laws of India. Jio blamed its competitors Airtel and Vodafone for spreading rumours of "Reliance being an undue beneficiary in the farm bills", an allegation both the companies denied. The company saw a loss of around 25 lakh (2.5 million) subscribers in Punjab and Haryana between November and December 2020.

=== Bird deaths ===
In January 2021, several social media posts started circulating linking bird deaths to Jio's 5G network trials. The claims were found to be fake as 5G trials were not yet permitted. The cause of the death of the birds is determined as due to an outbreak of bird flu.

== See also ==
- Jio Payments Bank
- JioSaavn
- List of telecom companies in India
- List of mobile network operators
- Reliance Foundation
- Reliance Industries Limited
- Telecommunications in India
