= Nokia 8110 4G =

2018 mobile phone released by HMD Global

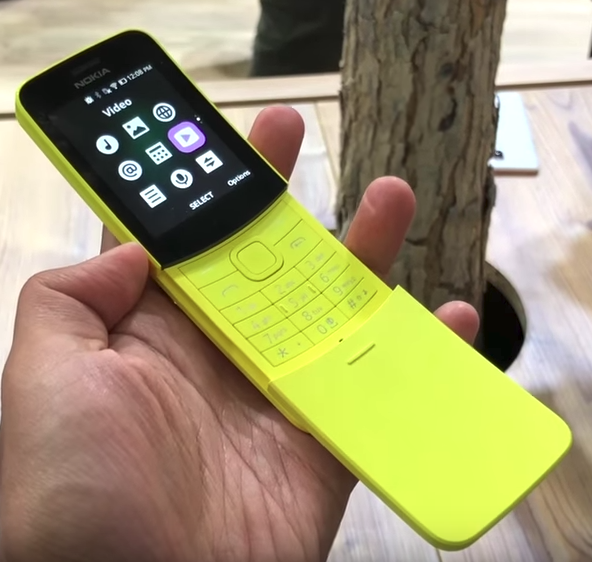
- The Nokia 8110 4G in yellow
- Brand: Nokia
- Developer: HMD Global
- Manufacturer: Foxconn
- Type: Feature phone
- First released: 25 February 2018; 8 years ago
- Predecessor: Nokia 8110
- Related: Nokia 3310 (2017)
- Compatible networks: GSM, WCDMA, FDD-LTE (and TDD-LTE for SKU2 variant)
- Form factor: Slider
- Dimensions: 133.45 mm (5.254 in) H 49.3 mm (1.94 in) W 14.5 mm (0.57 in) D
- Weight: 117 g (4.1 oz)
- Operating system: Smart Feature OS (KaiOS based)
- System-on-chip: Qualcomm MSM8905 Snapdragon 205 (28 nm)
- CPU: Dual-core (2x1.1 GHz Cortex-A7)
- GPU: Adreno 304
- Memory: 512 MB LPDDR3 RAM
- Storage: 4 GB
- Removable storage: microSD, up to 32 GB
- Battery: 1500 mAh Li-ion (removable) stand-by time: 25 days (4G Single SIM); 17.7 days (4G Dual SIM)
- Rear camera: 2 MP, LED flash
- Display: 2.45 in (62 mm) TFT LCD, 240 x 320 resolution
- Sound: AAC, AMR, MP3, MIDI, Vorbis format supported
- Connectivity: Wi-Fi 802.11 b/g/n, Bluetooth 4.1, GPS/AGPS, FM Radio, microUSB 2.0, 3.5mm headphone jack
- Data inputs: Alphanumeric keypad
- Other: Drip protection (IP52), Wi-Fi hotspot, preloaded KaiOS store and Snake game
- Website: https://www.hmd.com/en_int/nokia-8110-4g

The Nokia 8110 4G is a Nokia-branded mobile phone developed by HMD Global. It was announced on 25 February 2018 at Mobile World Congress (MWC) 2018 as a revival of the original Nokia 8110, which was popularly known as the "Matrix phone" or "banana phone". It is the second of the Nokia Originals to be launched. The phone is Dual SIM capable even though it is limited to 2G in one slot, while running both SIM cards. It runs on an operating system based on KaiOS.

== Firmware history ==
Firmware version 11 added Google services like Google Search, YouTube, Google Maps and Google Assistant. This was arranged through the company's partnership with Google.

Since firmware version 13, a Twitter app is also installed by default.

In firmware version 15, the WhatsApp and Facebook apps were made available via Store.

== Firmware releases ==
Version	Announced
10.00.17.02	Initial version
11.00.17.03	June 2018
12.00.17.06/10	4 July 2018
13.00.17.01	18 October 2018
14.00.17.04	27 November 2018
15.00.17.03	April 2019
16.00.17.00	26 April 2019
17.00.17.01	19 November 2019

== See also ==
- Nokia 2720 Flip
- Nokia 800 Tough
- HMD Barbie Phone
