= KaiOS =

Mobile operating system designed for feature phones

- Developer: KaiOS Technologies (Hong Kong) Limited (with TCL as largest shareholder)
- Written in: HTML, CSS, JavaScript, C++
- OS family: Linux (Unix-like); Android
- Working state: Current
- Source model: Source-available (except for the binary blobs)
- Initial release: October 2017; 9 years ago
- Latest release: 4.0 / May 2025; 1 year ago
- Marketing target: Feature phones
- Available in: 88 languages
- List of languages Afrikaans, Albanian, Arabic, Armenian, Assamese, Azerbaijani, Basque, Belarusian, Bengali (Bangladesh), Bengali (India), Bodo, Bosnian, Bulgarian, Catalan, Croatian, Czech, Danish, Dogri, Dutch, English (United Kingdom), English (United States), Estonian, Filipino, Finnish, French (Canada), French (France), Galician, Georgian, German, Greek, Gujarati, Hausa, Hebrew, Hindi, Hungarian, Icelandic, Indonesian, Italian, Kannada, Kashmiri, Kazakh, Khmer, Konkani, Lao, Latvian, Lithuanian, Macedonian, Maithili, Malay, Malayalam, Manipuri, Marathi, Nepali, Norwegian, Oriya, Pashto, Persian, Polish, Portuguese (Brazil), Portuguese (Portugal), Punjabi, Romanian (Moldavia), Romanian (Romania), Russian, Sanskrit, Santali, Serbian (Latin and Cyrillic alphabet), Simplified Chinese, Sindhi, Sinhalese, Slovak, Slovenian, Spanish (Latin America), Spanish (Spain), Swahili, Swedish, Tajik, Tamil, Telugu, Thai, Traditional Chinese (Hong Kong), Traditional Chinese (Taiwan), Turkish, Ukrainian, Urdu, Vietnamese, Xhosa, Zulu
- Package manager: KaiStore
- Supported platforms: ARM
- Kernel type: Monolithic (Linux)
- Default user interface: Graphical
- License: Proprietary, Linux kernel patches under GPLv2, B2G under MPL
- Preceded by: Firefox OS, Nokia Asha platform
- Official website: www.kaiostech.com

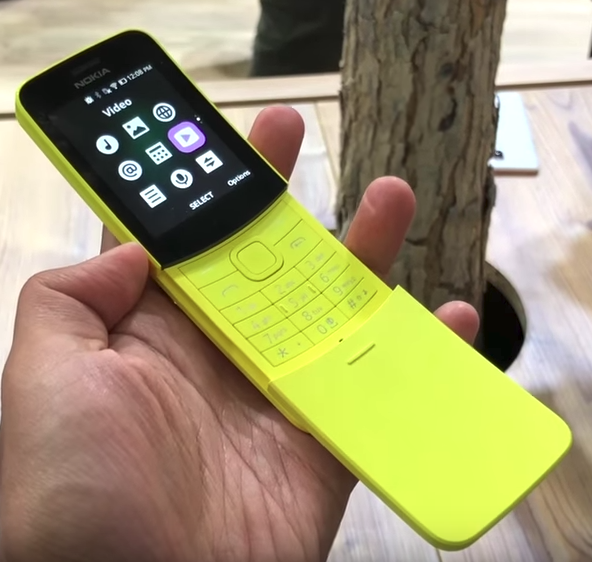
Nokia 8110 4G "banana phone"

KaiOS is a mobile Linux distribution for keypad-based mobile phones. It is designed and optimised for affordable and low-power feature phones, while having access to Internet services through web apps, based on the Gecko engine. KaiOS was originally forked from the former Firefox OS open-source project, and is developed by KaiOS Technologies (Hong Kong) Limited; a company based in Hong Kong, whose largest shareholder is Chinese electronics conglomerate TCL Corporation.

Currently, KaiOS was forked from Android for Gonk, so that device manufacturers and KaiOS themselves don't have to develop separate drivers for every component wanting to interact with the Gecko engine, but it cannot run Android's apps due to the lack of Android Runtime.

== Overview and features ==
KaiOS supports modern connectivity technologies like 4G LTE, VoLTE, GPS, and Wi-Fi. KaiOS runs HTML5-based apps, supports over-the-air updates, and has a dedicated app marketplace called KaiStore. Some applications are preinstalled onto the phone, including Facebook and YouTube. As of 1 April 2020, there are 500+ apps in KaiStore.

The mobile operating system is comparatively lightweight on hardware resource usage, and is able to run on devices with just 256 megabytes (MB) of memory.

== History ==
The operating system was first released in 2017, and is developed by KaiOS Technologies Inc., a Hong Kong–based company headed by CEO Sebastien Codeville, with offices in other countries. In June 2018, Google invested US$22 million in the operating system. That same year, India-based telecom operator Reliance Jio also invested $7 million through its sister concern, Reliance Retail for a 16% stake in the company. In May 2019, KaiOS raised an additional $50 million USD from Cathay Innovation, and previous investors Google and TCL Holdings.

In market share study results announced in May 2018, KaiOS beat Apple's iOS for second place in India, while Android dominates with 71%, albeit down by 9%. KaiOS growth is being largely attributed to the popularity of the competitively-priced JioPhone. In Q1 2018, 23 million KaiOS devices were produced.

As of February 2018, KaiOS Technologies has partnered with Mozilla, Airfind, Avenir Telecom (Energizer), Facebook, Google, Bullitt, Doro, HMD Global, Micromax, NXP, Spreadtrum, Qualcomm, Jio, Sprint, AT&T, T-Mobile, and Orange S.A.

In March 2020, Mozilla and KaiOS Technologies announced a partnership to update KaiOS with a modern version of the Gecko browser engine, and more closely aligned testing infrastructure. This change should give KaiOS four years worth of performance and security improvements and new features, including TLS 1.3, WebAssembly, WebGL 2.0, Progressive Web Apps, new video codecs like WebP, AV1, and modern JavaScript and Cascading Style Sheets (CSS) features.

== Devices ==
Jio Phone

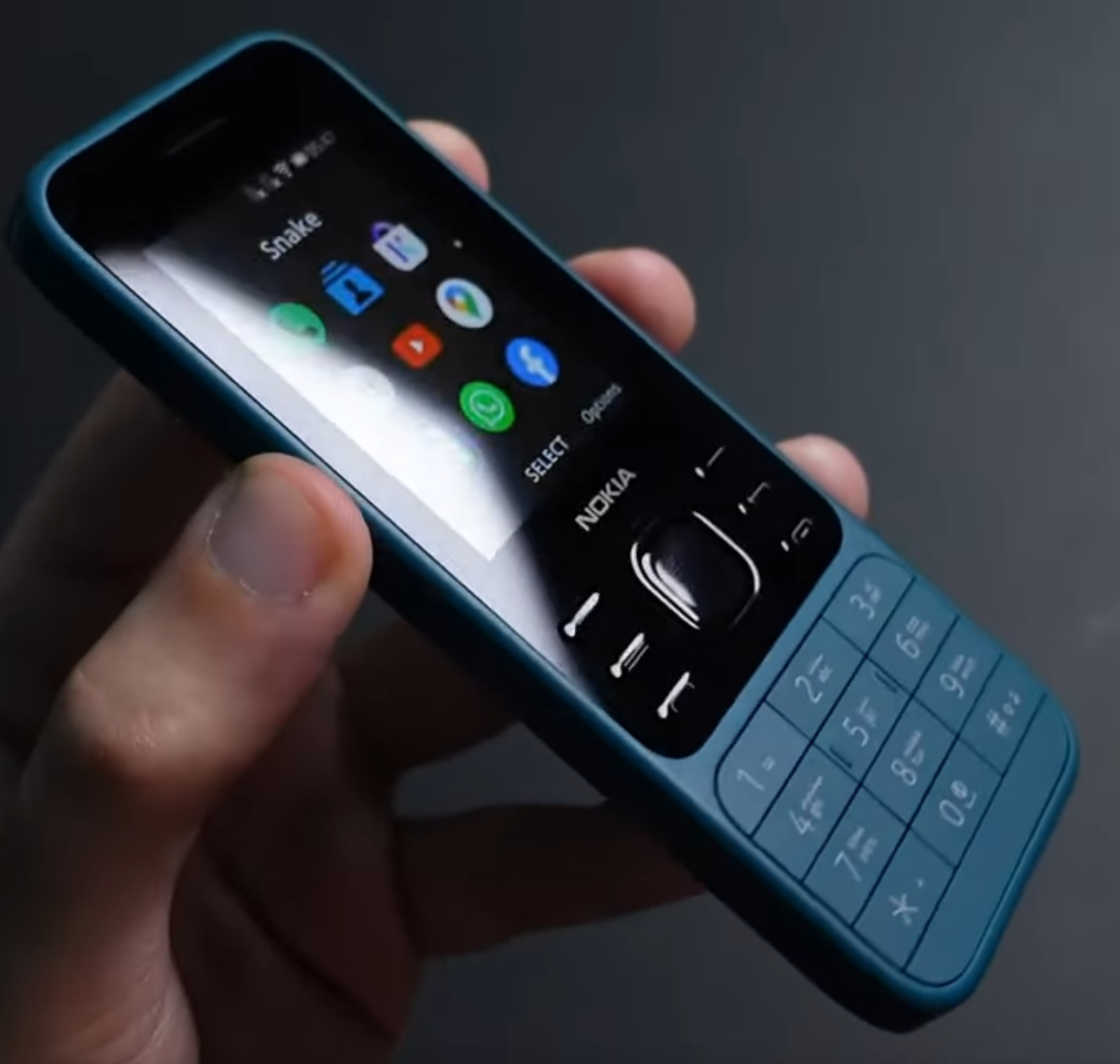
Nokia 6300 4G

Devices that are installed with KaiOS include (KaiStore may not be included, if device vendor removed it):

- Alcatel Go Flip (known as Cingular Flip 2 on AT&T, Alcatel MyFlip on TracFone Wireless) and 3088X
- Advan Hape Online (Indonesia) in partnership with Indosat Ooredoo.
- Reliance Jio's JioPhone, F10Q, F101K, F120B, F220B, F211S, F221S, F250Y, F271I, F30C, F41T, F50Y, F61F, F81E, F90M, LF-2401, LF-2402, LF-2403, LF-2403N, all branded as LYF, JioPhone 2, F300B, F310B, JioPhone Lite, F320B, Prima 4G
- HMD Global's Nokia 8110 4G, 2720 Flip, 800 Tough, 6300 4G, 8000 4G, Nokia 2760 Flip, Nokia 2780 Flip, and HMD's Barbie™ Phone (U.S. version). These devices were used a modified user interface called Smart Feature OS (not to be confused with the same name platform based on Mocor OS in Nokia 3310 3G).
- Energizer Energy E220, E220S, E241, E241S, E242S and Hardcase H241, H242, H280S, E282SC
- Doro 7050, 7060
- Cat B35
- Gigaset GL7
- Maxcom MK241, MK281
- WizPhone WP006, launched in Indonesia in partnership with Google and Alfamart.
- MTN 3G phone (MTN Smart S 3G)
- Positivo P70S (Brazil)
- Multilaser ZAPP (Brazil)
- Tecno T901
- IKU V400 4G
- I-Plus I4g
- Lava Captain 11 3G
- Jazz Digit 4G (Pakistan)
- Orange Sanza 2, Sanza XL
- Kitochi 4G Smart
- Vodacom Smart Kitochi (Vida), Vodacom Smart Kitochi (Azumi)
- QMobile 4G Plus (Pakistan)
- GeoPhone T15, T19, T19i (Made in India for Bangladesh)
- Sigma mobile X-Style S3500 sKai (Ukraine)
- Ghia KOX1, GK3G, GQWERTY (Mexico)
- myPhone Up Smart, Up Smart LTE (Poland)
- Symphony PD1 4G (Bangladesh)
- BKAV C85 (Vietnam) in partnership with Viettel. This is the only KaiOS device to not feature Wi-Fi support
- Viettel V6504, V1207 (Vietnam). The Viettel V1207, one of the wireless home phones, runs KaiOS.
- itel it9200 (China)
- TCL Flip, Flip 3, Flip Pro and Flip 4. Other devices of TCL Flip series run Android with user interface similar to KaiOS.

All KaiOS devices have T9 keypads, except the Jiophone 2 and Ghia GQWERTY, which have QWERTY keypads.

== Release history ==
version	announced	new features	First device
1.0	March 2017	First KaiOS smart feature flip phone with Gecko 37	Alcatel OneTouch Go Flip (OT-4044)
2.0	July 2017	Major core upgrade to Gecko 48	
2.5.0	November 2017	Services and 3rd party apps	Nokia 8110 4G
2.5.1	July 2018	KaiStore, KaiAccount, and advanced features, WhatsApp (available until 2025)	
2.5.1.1	September 2018	Minor system updates	
2.5.2	December 2018	KaiAds and SIMbased cust.	Nokia 2720 Flip, Nokia 800 Tough
2.5.3	July 2019	Major service upgrades, location service enhancement	
2.5.3.1	February 2020	Minor system updates, notification enhancement	
2.5.3.2	May 2020	Device Financing Program, Dual SIM LTE support	Gigaset GL7
2.5.4	August 2020	LF 1.6 integration, North America requirement	Nokia 6300 4G, Nokia 8000 4G
3.0	September 2021	Major platform Upgrade, Gecko upgrade from version 48 (2016) to version 84 (December 2020). Older apps require that their developers adapt the apps to this OS version and publish an update to the store. WhatsApp not available anymore for KaiOS v3.	Nokia 2760 Flip
3.1	March 2022	Minor system updates	Nokia 2780 Flip
4.0	May 2025	Upgrade to Gecko 123 engine, Android 14 base, Qualcomm SM4635 chipset with 5G cellular support.	TCL Flip 4

== Jailbreak ==
With the release of the Nokia 8110 4G, an active community (colloquially known as Banana Hackers) around both KaiOS and the phone arose and released the first version of a jailbreak. This gave users the ability to use apps outside KaiStore including old Firefox OS apps on KaiOS devices, as well as flashing their devices with community-created ROMs, such as GerdaOS.

Some models can also be rooted, giving the user further control over the device.

== See also ==
- Flip phone
- T9 (predictive text)
