= Nokia 800 Tough =

Nokia phone

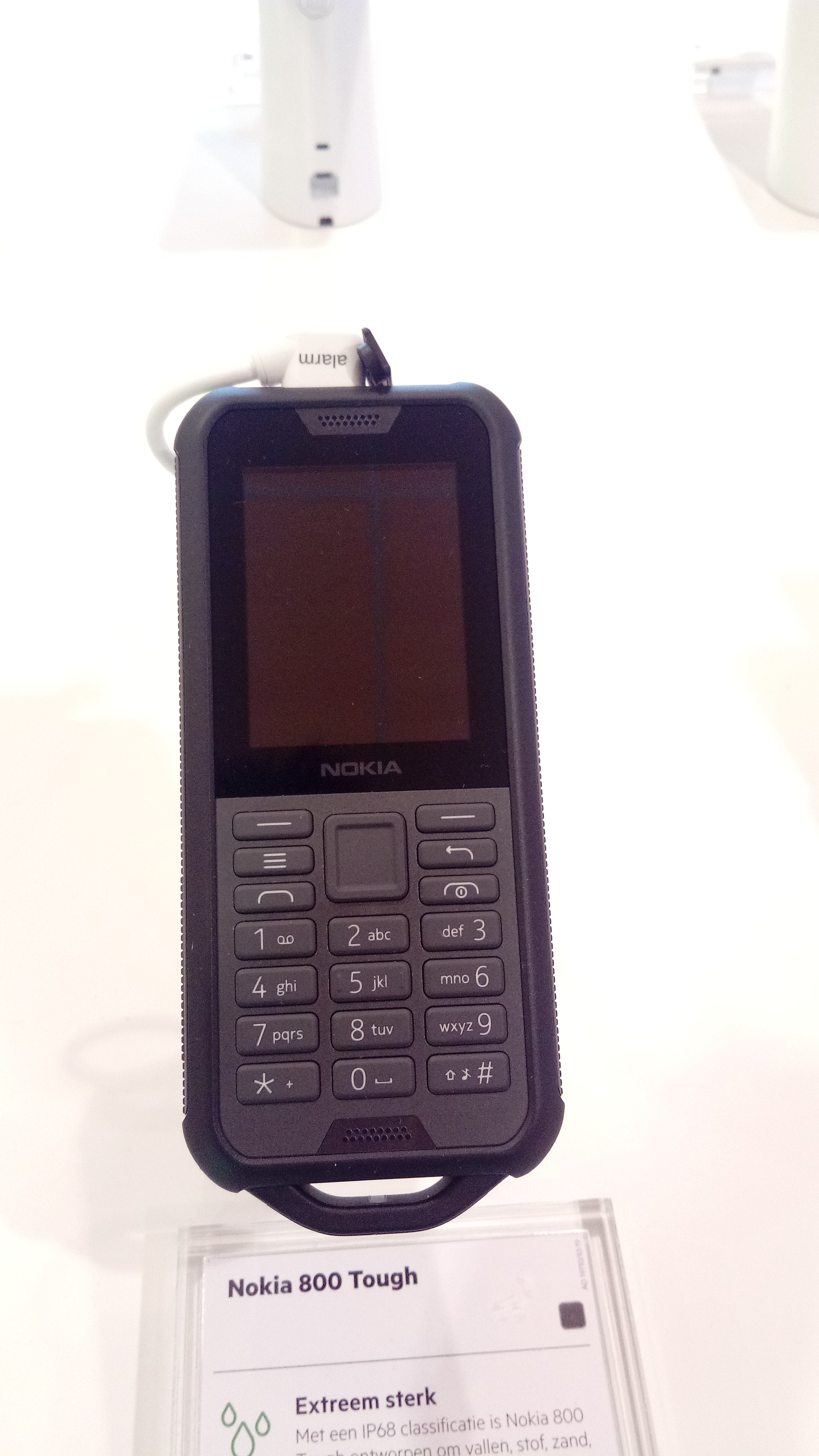
- A Nokia 800 Tough phone on display.
- Brand: Nokia
- Developer: HMD Global
- Manufacturer: Foxconn
- Type: Feature phone
- First released: 5 September 2019; 7 years ago
- Units sold: 126,670
- Units shipped: 67,395
- Predecessor: Nokia 2720 Flip
- Successor: HMD Terra M
- Form factor: Candybar
- Dimensions: 145.4 mm (5.72 in) H 62.1 mm (2.44 in) W 16.1 mm (0.63 in) D
- Weight: 161 g (5.7 oz)
- Operating system: KaiOS
- System-on-chip: Qualcomm MSM8905 Snapdragon 205 (28 nm)
- CPU: Dual-core (2x1.1 GHz Cortex-A7)
- GPU: Adreno 304
- Memory: 512 MB LPDDR3 RAM
- Storage: 4 GB
- Removable storage: microSD, up to 32 GB
- Battery: 2100 mAh Li-ion (non-removable) stand-by time: up to 43 days (3G)
- Rear camera: 2 MP, LED flash
- Display: 2.4 in (61 mm) TFT LCD, 240 x 320 resolution
- Connectivity: 3.5 mm TRRS headphone jack; Bluetooth 4.1 with A2DP, LE; WiFi 802.11 b/g/n, hotspot; GPS, GLONASS; FM radio; micro USB 2.0
- Data inputs: Alphanumeric keypad
- Website: www.hmd.com/en_int/nokia-800-tough

The Nokia 800 Tough is a Nokia-branded mobile phone developed by HMD Global. It was unveiled at IFA 2019 together with the Nokia 110 (2019), Nokia 2720 Flip, Nokia 6.2, and Nokia 7.2. It was preceded by the Nokia 2720 Flip.

The device can survive a free fall from up to 3.6 meters (12'), is IP68 rated and conforms to MIL-STD-810G standard. It runs on the KaiOS operating system, and has a non-removable battery with a capacity of 2100 mAh.

The device has an MP3/WAV/AAC/MP4/H.264 player, predictive T9 typing, supports SNS (Social Networking Service) apps including WhatsApp, Facebook and Google Assistant.

In February 2020, the device received an iF Design Award 2020 by iF International Forum Design.

== Successor ==
In 2025, HMD Global announced HMD Terra M, which was possibly the direct successor of Nokia 800 Tough. The device is IP68 rated and conforms to MIL-STD-810H standard, but runs on the Android operating system instead of KaiOS.

== See also ==
- Nokia 2720 Flip
- Nokia 8110 4G
