= LYF =

Line of consumer electronic smartphones from Jio

Jio LYF
- Formerly: Reliance LYF
- Type: Subsidiary
- Industry: Smartphone; Consumer electronics
- Founded: 2015; 11 years ago
- Founder: Mukesh Ambani
- Defunct: 2019; 7 years ago
- Headquarters: Mumbai, Maharashtra, India
- Area served: India
- Key people: Mukesh Ambani
- Products: Smartphones; Feature phones; Laptops; Hotspot
- Owner: Reliance Industries
- Parent: Jio

Jio LYF (pronounced "life"), also known as LYF, is an Indian brand of smartphones, laptops, consumer electronics developed by Jio and headquartered in Mumbai, Maharashtra, India. It manufactures 4G-enabled VoLTE smartphones which run on Android. It is a subsidiary of Jio, the telecommunication arm of Reliance Industries.

According to Counterpoint Research, LYF was the fifth largest smartphone player and second largest LTE phone supplier in India in 2016.

== History ==
LYF was established in 2015 by the telecom operator, Jio. Marketed closely along with Jio's 4G services, smartphones under the brand were slated to launch in November 2015. In January 2016, it launched its first set of 4G-enabled smartphones named after the four classical elements: Earth, Flame (Fire), Water, and Wind.

== Market ==
In May 2016, international market tracker Counterpoint Research reported that LYF had become the fifth-largest smartphone producer in the Indian market, capturing a 7% share in the January–March quarter of the financial year 2015-16. It was the second-largest LTE phone supplier after Samsung, surpassing Micromax and Lenovo during the quarter. "In first quarter of its inception, LYF instantly climbed to become one of the top five smartphone brands in India in terms of shipment volumes," Tarun Pathak, senior analyst at Counterpoint said in the report. Reliance Digital had shipped around 1.7 million LYF branded smartphones in the first quarter of 2016.

== Products ==
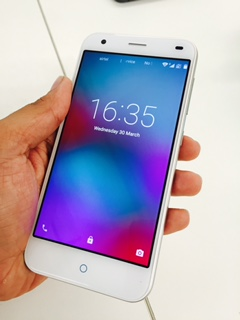
An image of LYF WATER 2 phone with IPS display

In October 2015, LYF tied up with another domestic handset maker Intex to supply 4G handsets enabled with voice over LTE (VoLTE) feature. In January 2016, it launched its first set of smartphones - LYF Earth 1, LYF Water 1, and LYF Water 2.

== Production ==
LYF smartphones are manufactured by ZTE, Intex, as well as ODMs like CK Telecom Limited, Wingtech, and Wiko. As of early 2016, it has been reported that 600,000 smartphones have been supplied to LYF by ZTE.

== Distribution ==
LYF phones are directly sold through its retail outlets. In February 2016, LYF tied up with app-based delivery service Grofers and online retailer Amazon to deliver its phones to users.
