= Wireless home phone =

A wireless home phone service is a service that allows a regular wired telephone to connect to a cellular network, as if it were a mobile phone. It is an example of a wireless last mile connection to the public switched telephone network, also known as a wireless local loop.

A small device, about the size of a home wireless router, contains the necessary electronics which allow plain old telephone service to be provided to one or two telephone jacks on the back of the unit, as well as having a small radio antenna and a transceiver for the Wireless side of the connection. LED indicator lights on the front typically show signal strength and voicemail messages waiting. The devices usually cannot provide enough ringing current for more than one phone and one externally powered device, such as a telephone answering device or the base station for a cordless phone. For this reason, it is not recommended to connect these devices to a home's wiring (which also requires the disconnection of the wiring at the network interface device, just as when a cable telephone or other whole-home VoIP service is installed). A rechargeable battery backup is normally provided to run the device during a power outage lasting no more than a few hours, significantly less standby time than a true mobile device.

Wireless home phone services provide far more alternatives to existing phone companies than other competitors have been able to provide where local loop unbundling has occurred. Where secondary lines on a cellular plan are inexpensive, the WHP line may cost as little as 10 dollars per month, using the airtime (mobile phone) minutes which are not used by the mobile phones on the plan. Unlimited plans typically run around 20 dollars per month, far less than unlimited plans for actual mobile devices, and significantly less than an unlimited landline, and comparable to measured service with low usage. This has led users to port their existing telephone numbers to their mobile plans, although monthly prepaid service is also available. This also allows for physical portability of home phone service, either temporarily (such as when spending a summer or winter traveling in a recreational vehicle), or when making a permanent relocation to another area code. WHP may also be combined with a mobile hotspot in a single device, which also typically has a less-expensive data plan than a smartphone or a dedicated hotspot device, though still far more per gigabyte than wired broadband Internet.

Disadvantages include being dependent on a single source for telephony, such that if the nearest cell tower experiences an outage, there is no landline to use as a backup for anything except emergency calls. The companding, audio level compression, and audio data compression used in mobile telephony also ruin any data signals used by modem-based devices, including fax machines, medical monitoring devices, and even set-top boxes for satellite TV, preventing their use for anything except displaying the caller ID for incoming calls.

In the United States, WHP service is offered under various names (usually Wireless Home Phone or Home Phone Connect) by Sprint Nextel, T-Mobile USA, AT&T Mobility, Verizon Wireless, Ting Inc. (via Sprint), and Straight Talk.
