= Nokia 2760 =

2007 cell phone model

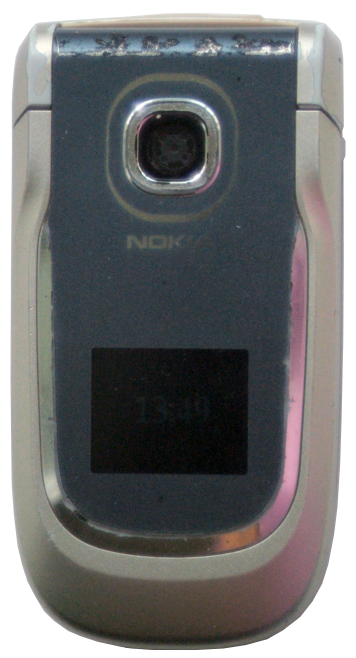
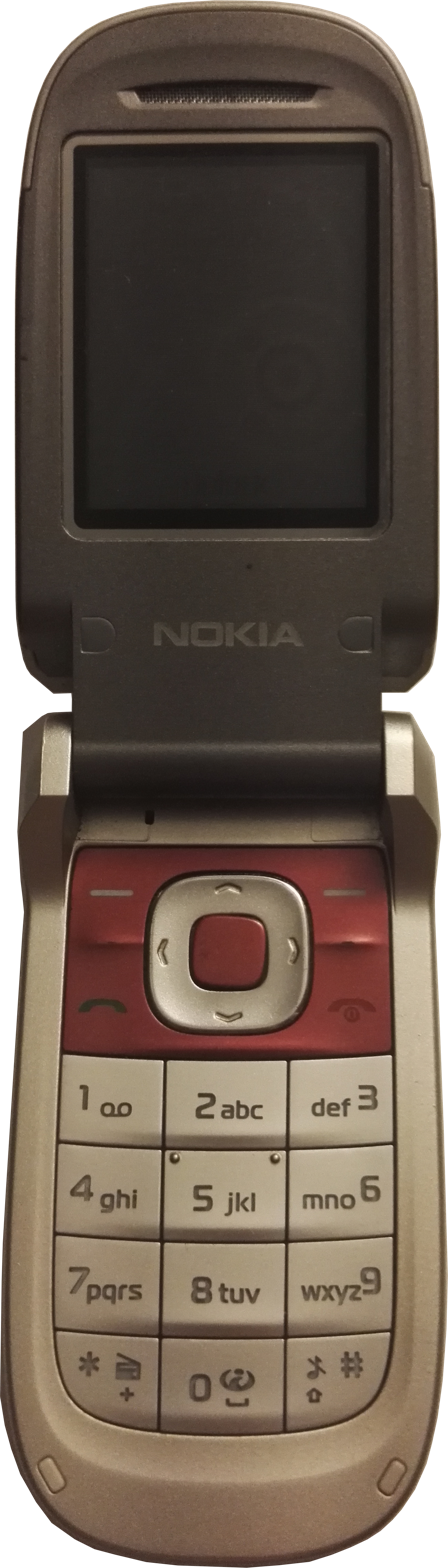
- Manufacturer: Nokia
- Series: series 2000
- First released: April 26, 2007; 19 years ago
- Availability by region: May 3, 2007
- Discontinued: Q4 2011
- Compatible networks: wap, html
- Form factor: Flip
- Dimensions: 87×45×21 mm (3.43×1.77×0.83 in) (when closed)
- Weight: 81 g (3 oz)
- Operating system: Series 40 5th Edition LE, Java ME
- CPU: 1core, 1MB, 15mhz
- Memory: 13MB / 11MB open
- Removable storage: no
- Battery: Up to 7 hours talk time, up to 14 days standby BL-4B 600mA/h
- Rear camera: VGA (640x480) stills, 128x96 8fps video
- Front camera: no
- Display: 128x160 pixels, 65 thousand colors
- External display: 96x68 pixels, monochrome
- Connectivity: Bluetooth, 2.5mm audio jack, handsfree connector
- Development status: discontinued
- Hearing aid compatibility: M3/T3
- Other: Superb life java apps

The Nokia 2760 is a clamshell Mobile phone released by Nokia in April 2007 and manufactured in Hungary. Its operating frequency is Dual band GSM 900/1800(RM-258) or 850/1900(RM-259, RM-391 for T-Mobile USA). The phone supports EDGE for mobile broadband. The Nokia 2760 was popular in the late-2000s, with it being the most popular choice of mobile phone in Finland in 2010.

== Nokia 2760 Flip ==
In December 2021, HMD Global announced a re-release of the Nokia 2760. Branded the Nokia 2760 Flip, the phone features KaiOS, USB Type-C, a five-megapixel camera, MicroSD storage (only available on very early production units) and support for Wi-Fi and Bluetooth connectivity, as well as GPS navigation and 4G connectivity.

=== Nokia 2780 Flip ===
The Nokia 2780 Flip is essentially the 2760 Flip with an FM radio and MicroSD card slot. The 2780 Flip is also not carrier-locked. The Nokia 2780 Flip was announced in November 2022.
