= Future Group =

Indian conglomerate company pvt ltd

Future Group(Dead)
- Type: Private
- Industry: Conglomerate
- Founded: 2013; 13 years ago
- Founder: Kishore Biyani
- Defunct: 2022; 4 years ago
- Fate: Acquired by Reliance Industries
- Headquarters: Mumbai, Maharashtra, India
- Products: Retailing; Insurance; Logistics; Integrated foods; FMCG
- Number of employees: 50,000
- Divisions: Brand Factory; Future Retail Limited; Future Lifestyle Fashion Limited; Future Consumer Enterprise Limited; Future Innoversity Limited; Future Supply Chains Limited; Future Brands Limited; Future Capital Holdings Limited; Future Style Lab; Central Mall; Galaxy Cloud Kitchens; HyperCity Retail India Ltd.; Nilgiris; Vulcan Express Private Limited; Capital First Ltd.
- Website: www.futuregroup.in

Future Group was an Indian conglomerate founded by Kishore Biyani and based in Mumbai. The company was known in Indian retail and fashion sectors, operating supermarket chains Big Bazaar and Food Bazaar, lifestyle stores Brand Factory and Central, integrated foods and FMCG manufacturing sectors. Future Retail Limited and Future Lifestyle Fashions Limited were two operating companies whose assets were among the top retail companies listed in BSE, with market capitalization among the highest on the National Stock Exchange of India.

Nearly all of its businesses are managed through sector-focused operating companies.

The group promotes its fashion and sports brands Indigo Nation, Spalding, Lombard, and Bare, and FMCG brands Tasty Treat, Fresh & Pure, Clean Mate, Ektaa, Premium Harvest, Sach. Other operating companies address internal financial matters and consulting. The company is attempting to reduce debt to avoid insolvency, according to industry sources.

== History ==
In May 2012, Future Group announced a 50.1% stake sale of its fashion chain Pantaloons to Aditya Birla Group to reduce its debt of around ₹8,000 crore (equivalent to ₹160 billion or US$1.7 billion in 2026). To do so, the Pantaloons fashion segment was demerged from Pantaloons Retail India Ltd, which was then merged into subsidiary Future Value Retail Ltd and later renamed Future Retail Ltd.

On 21 November 2014, Future Consumer Enterprises Limited acquired 98% of Nilgris from Actis Capital and other promoters. With that, Nilgiris is a wholly owned subsidiary of Future Consumer Enterprises Limited (FCEL).

In May 2015, Future Group acquired Bharti Retail in a deal worth around ₹500 crore (equivalent to ₹823 crore or US$86 million in 2026). Bharti Retail operated 216 convenience stores, supermarkets and hypermarkets under the brand name Easyday. Following the acquisition, Bharti Enterprises received 9% stakes in Future Retail Limited (manages retail operations) and Future Enterprises Limited (manages infrastructure, investments and assets).

In August 2019, Amazon acquired a 49% stake in Future Coupons, and indirectly obtained a 3.5% minority stake in Future Retail, ahead of an option to buy all or part of the promoters' holding in the company.

In August 2020, it was announced that Reliance Retail had reached an agreement with Future Group to acquire the latter's retail and wholesale businesses and its logistics and warehousing businesses for $3.4 billion.

The merger between Reliance Retail and Future Group was halted in October 2020, after Amazon filed a plea in the High Court for enforcement of EA awarded by the Singapore International Arbitration Center. In August 2021, the Supreme Court of India upheld Amazon's plea to restrain the merger. In December 2021, the CCI withdrew its approval for Amazon's acquisition of a minority stake in Future Coupons, stating that Amazon had misled the regulator about the purpose of its investment in the Future Group company.

== Operations and subsidiaries ==
=== Retail ===
- Future Retail Ltd
- Future Lifestyle Fashion Ltd
- Future Consumer Limited
- Future Enterprises Limited
- Swathi Tiffin Shop
- Foodhall

=== Financial services ===
- Future Capital Holdings (for internal financial services)
- Future Generali India Life Insurance
- Future Generali India Insurance
- Future Ventures

=== Other services ===
- Future Innoversity
- Future Supply Chains
- Future Brands

== Brands ==
=== Future Retail Ltd. ===
- Big Bazaar
- FBB (Fashion at Big Bazaar)
- Central (Department Store)
- Nilgiris 1905
- aLL (A Little Larger)
- Easyday
- Heritage Fresh
- WHSmith
- Brand Factory
- 7-Eleven
- Aadhaar Wholesale

=== Future Lifestyle Fashion Ltd ===
- Planet Sports
- I AM in

=== Fashion and lifestyle ===
- Indigo Nation
- Scullers
- John Millers
- All
- Rig
- Coverstory
- SPUNK
- DJ&C
- Buffalo
- Hey
- Bare
- Clarks
- Holii
- UMM
- Urban Yoga
- Jealous 21

=== Integrated foods and FMCG ===
- Tasty Treat
- Fresh & Pure
- Ektaa
- Premium Harvest
- Mera Swad
- Pratha
- Punya
- Sach
- Kosh
- Sunkist
- Kara
- TS
- Clean mate
- Care mate
- Swiss tempelle
- Baker street
- Golden Harvest
- Prim
- Desi Atta Company
- Sangi's Kitchen
- Voom
- Dreamery
- Sensible Portions
- MYSST
- Puretta
- Veg Affaire
- Terra
- Mother Earth
- Karmiq

=== Joint ventures and associate companies ===
==== FabFurnish ====
FabFurnish was launched as an online retailer of furniture, furnishings, décor, and kitchenware in January 2012 by Vaibhav Aggarwal, Vikram Chopra, and Mehul Agrawal. The company was headquartered in Gurgaon, NCR.

In July 2015, the brand announced a strategic restructuring, introducing Ashish Garg and Ankita Dabas as the new leaders. In April 2016, FabFurnish became a Future Group company. On 13 April 2017, the Times of India reported that Future Group was likely to close FabFurnish.

==== Generali Group ====
Generali is an Italian insurance company, operating in India through a joint venture with Future Group under the brand name Future Generali Insurance. Future Generali operates in India via two Generali India Life Insurance Co. Ltd. (Life Insurance) and Generali India Insurance Co. Ltd. (Non-Life Insurance).^{[Primary 1]}

==== Staples Inc ====
Staples Inc., a United States–based office supply retailer, has a presence in over nine cities in India under a joint venture with Future Group.^{[Primary 2][7]} As of April 2013, Future Group had a 60% stake in the partnership.^{[8]}

==== Skechers ====
Skechers entered India through a JV with Future Group in 2012. Skechers ended the joint venture in February 2019 by buying 49% them out.^{[9]}

==== Celio ====
French fashion Celio entered India in 2008 through a 50:50 joint venture with Future Group's then retail hand, Pantaloons Retail India Ltd (now Future Retail Ltd).^{[10]} In November 2013, Celio hiked its stake in the joint venture to 65%.^{[11]}

==== Clark ====
C&J Clark International Ltd. is a UK-based footwear and accessories retailer. Future Group entered into a 50:50 joint venture to form 'Clarks Future Footwear Ltd'. The JV launched its first (1,600 sq ft.) stand-alone store in Connaught Place, Delhi on 19 April 2011.^{[12]}

==== Future Retail ====
These are the brands of Future Retail:

- Big Bazaar
- Central (Department Store)
- FBB (Fashion at Big Bazaar)
- Nilgiris 1905
- aLL (A Little Larger)
- Heritage Fresh
- Easyday
- WHSmith
- Brand Factory
- Aadhaar Wholesale

== See also ==
- Online shopping
- Ecommerce in India
