= Smart Bazaar =

Indian retail chain

Reliance Smart Bazaar
- Type: Private
- Industry: Retail
- Founded: 2001; 25 years ago as Big Bazaar
- Founder: Kishore Biyani
- Headquarters: Mumbai, Maharashtra, India
- Number of locations: 800 stores nationwide (April 2026)
- Area served: India
- Key people: Sarvesh Shivnath Shukla (founder); Sadashiv Nayak (President & CEO); Umashankar Shukla (director)
- Products: Electronics; Movies and music; Home and furniture; Home improvement; Clothing; Footwear; Jewellery; Toys; Health and beauty; Pet supplies; Sporting goods and fitness; Auto; Photo finishing; Craft supplies; Party supplies; Grocery
- Owner: Reliance
- Parent: Reliance Retail
- Website: reliancesmartbazaar.com

Reliance Smart Bazaar, formerly known as Big Bazaar, is an Indian retail chain of hypermarkets, discount department stores, and grocery stores. The retail chain was founded by Kishore Biyani under his parent organisation Future Group, which is known for having a significant prominence in Indian retail and fashion sectors. Big Bazaar is also the parent chain of Food Bazaar, Fashion at Big Bazaar (abbreviated as fbb) and eZone where at locations it houses all under one roof, while it is sister chain of retail outlets like Brand Factory, Home Town, Central, eZone, etc.

Founded in 2001, Big Bazaar is one of the oldest and largest hypermarket chains of India, housing about 300+ stores in over 120 cities and towns across the country. In February 2022, Reliance Industries took control of over 200 Future group stores and rebranded Big Bazaar as Reliance's Smart Bazaar Stores and rest of them were shut down.

== History ==
Logo of Big Bazaar before renaming

Big Bazaar was founded in 2001 by Kishore Biyani, the founder and CEO of the parent company, the Future Group.

=== Acquisition ===
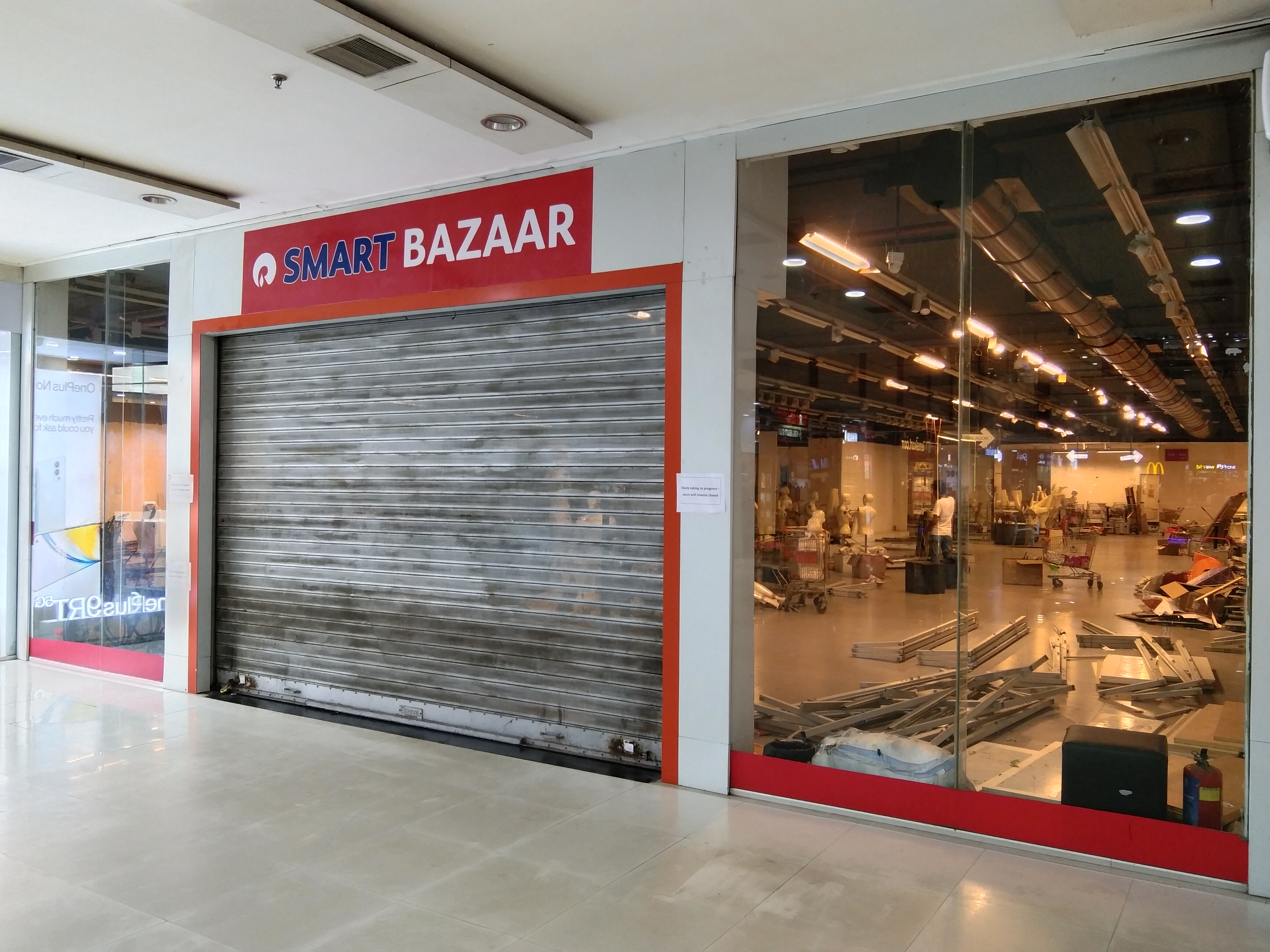
Big Bazaar Converting to Smart Bazaar at Avani Riverside Mall.

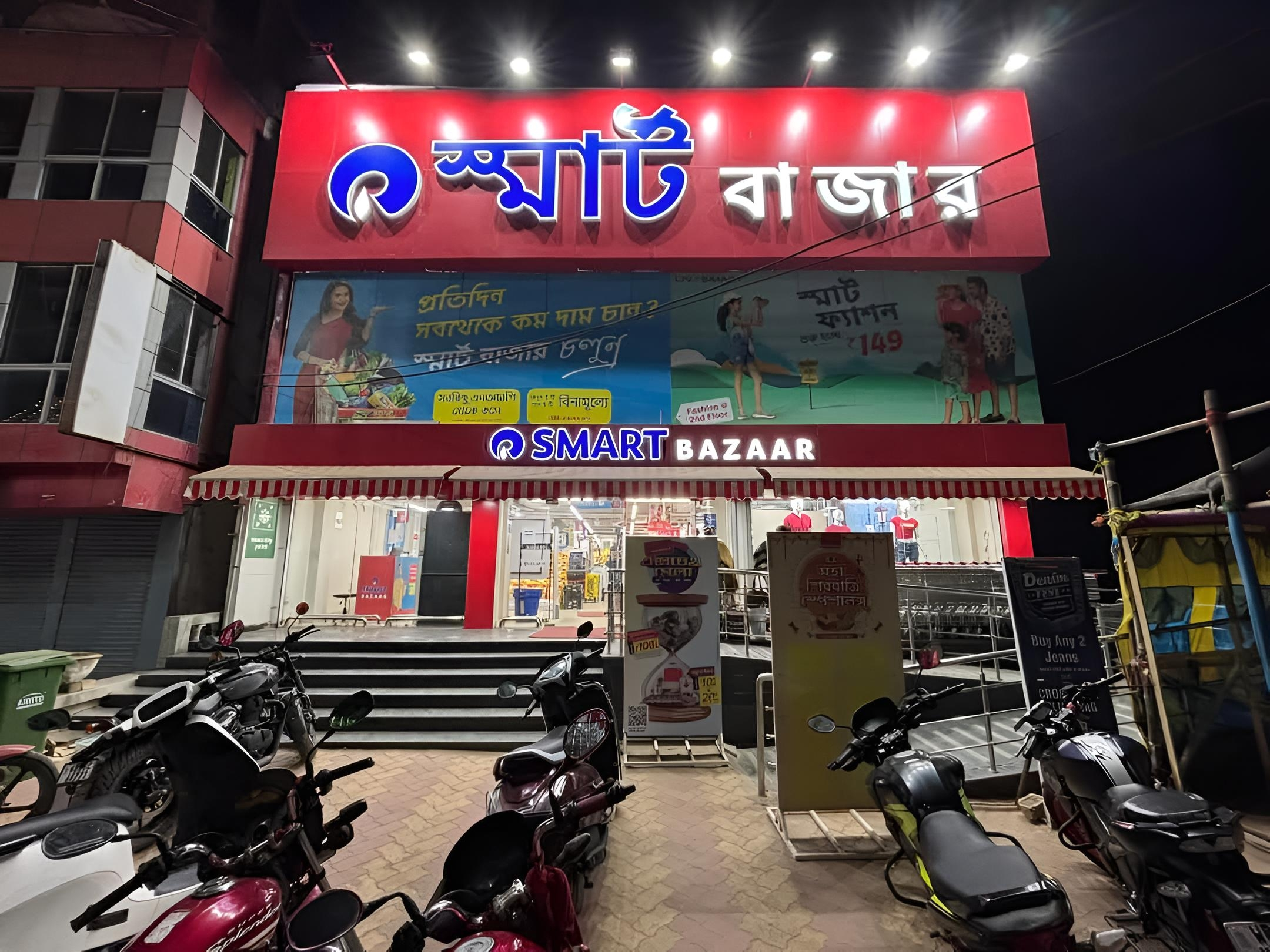
Reliance Retail's Smart Bazaar store in Basirhat

In 2020, Big Bazaar was acquired by Reliance Retail, the retail division of the Reliance Industries, as part of a ₹24,713 crore ($3.36 billion) sale transaction of Future Group. However, the deal was called off on 23 April 2022 after FRL's creditors voted against going forward with it. Reliance Retail launched its new retail format by the name of Reliance Smart Bazaar, that catered to consumer needs. It offers online and offline services to the customer. Online shopping services can be availed using the JioMart platform.

== Controversy ==
According to a September 2022 report by The New Indian Express, the Bhubaneswar Municipal Corporation (BMC) fined Reliance Smart Bazaar Rs 1.5 lakh for allegedly putting up posters and hoardings without permission. The fine included Rs 1 lakh for kiosk advertisements and Rs 50,000 for hoardings. The advertisements, placed between September 2 and 8, violated the BMC Advertisement Regulations 2006 and were deemed a public nuisance.

== See also ==
- DMart
- Future Group
- Centro
- More.
- Urban Ladder
- Reliance Fresh
- Spencer's
- Fashion Factory
