= Avani Riverside Mall =

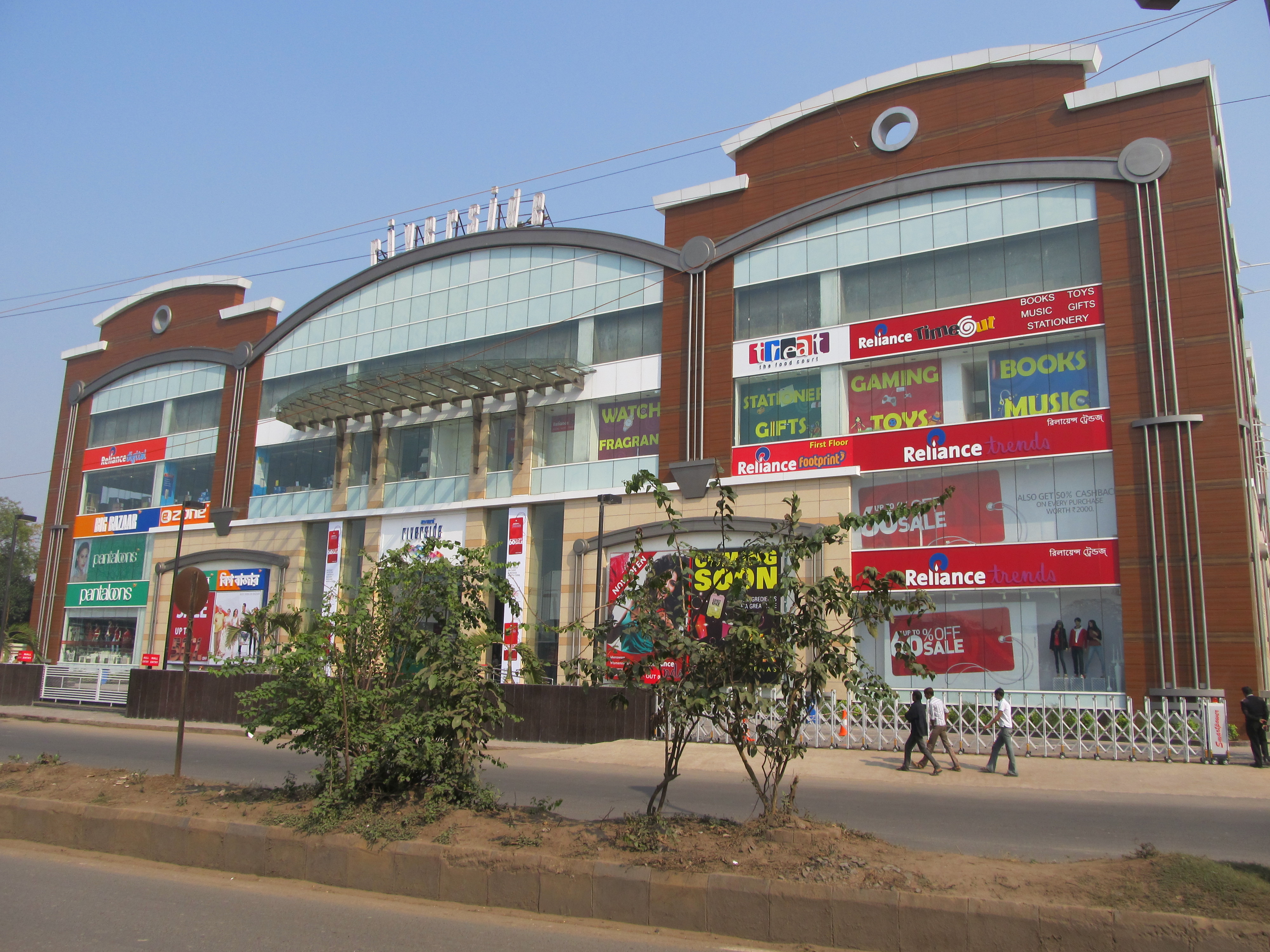
- Avani Riverside Mall in 2012
- Location: Shibpur, Howrah, West Bengal, India
- Coordinates: 22.5632°N 88.3237°E
- Address: 32, Jagat Banerjee Ghat Road.
- Opened: 2011; 15 years ago
- Developer: Avani Group
- Num. of stores: 144
- Num. of anchor tenants: 7
- Floor area: 600,000 sq ft (56,000 m^{2})
- Floors: 5 (1 underground)
- Website: avaniriversidemall.com

Avani Riverside Mall is a shopping mall in Howrah, West Bengal. Developed by Avani Group, it is the first mall in Howrah district as well as the first eco-green environment friendly mall in India. As of 2022, the mall is the largest mall of Howrah district. It is the only “Green Mall” in Eastern India, certified by Indian Green Building Council (as of 2020) with having "Platinum rating" for energy conservation (awarded in 2014). Multiplex chain operator PVR launched its first multiplex in East India at Avani Riverside Mall.

== Interior and features ==
- With 7 anchor stores, the mall has the highest number of large format departmental stores in Eastern India which include Reliance Trends, Pantaloons, Smart Bazaar, Reliance Digital, Trends Footwear and E-zone.
- Apart from this the mall has nearly 200 national and international brands like Allen Solley, Levis, Louis Phillipe, Nike, Pantaloons, Provogue, Linc, Peter England, Van Huesen, UCB, Timex, Bata, Color Plus, Little shop, Archies, etc.
- The mall also has a 12,000 sq ft state of art indoor banquet and a landscaped terrace banquet.
- There is a four-screen PVR multiplex (the first in Eastern India) is spread across 32,820 sq.ft., with a capacity of 1,186 seats.

== Eco-green mall ==
Avani Riverside Mall is equipped with the advanced environment friendly management system. Fly ash bricks have been used in its construction which are user friendly, easy to handle, fire resistance and good earthquake resistance. In 2014, the mall became first mall in India to be awarded with Indian Green Building Council "Platinum Award" for energy conservation suppressing about 500 malls in India. The mall uses an energy-efficient lighting system and a water-cooled air-conditioning system resulting 23% less energy consumption. With ultra low-flow hand flush at washrooms, it resulted a 40% reduction in water consumption. The mall also has an organic waste management system in place where the excess from cafeterias etc are used as manure.

== Events and achievements ==
- Tollywood actors Dev Adhikari and Rituparna Sengupta inaugurated the mall in 2011.
- Bollywood diva, Nandana Sen inaugurated the food court.
- In 2014, the mall became first mall in India to be awarded with the Indian Green Building Council Platinum Award for energy conservation from the President of India.
- Bengali actress Nusrat Jahan inaugurated the 4th Max store at Avani Riverside Mall in Kolkata on Sunday.
- iDestiny, Authorised Reseller store of US multinational company, Apple was launched in Avani Riverside Mall (first in Howrah).

== Gallery ==
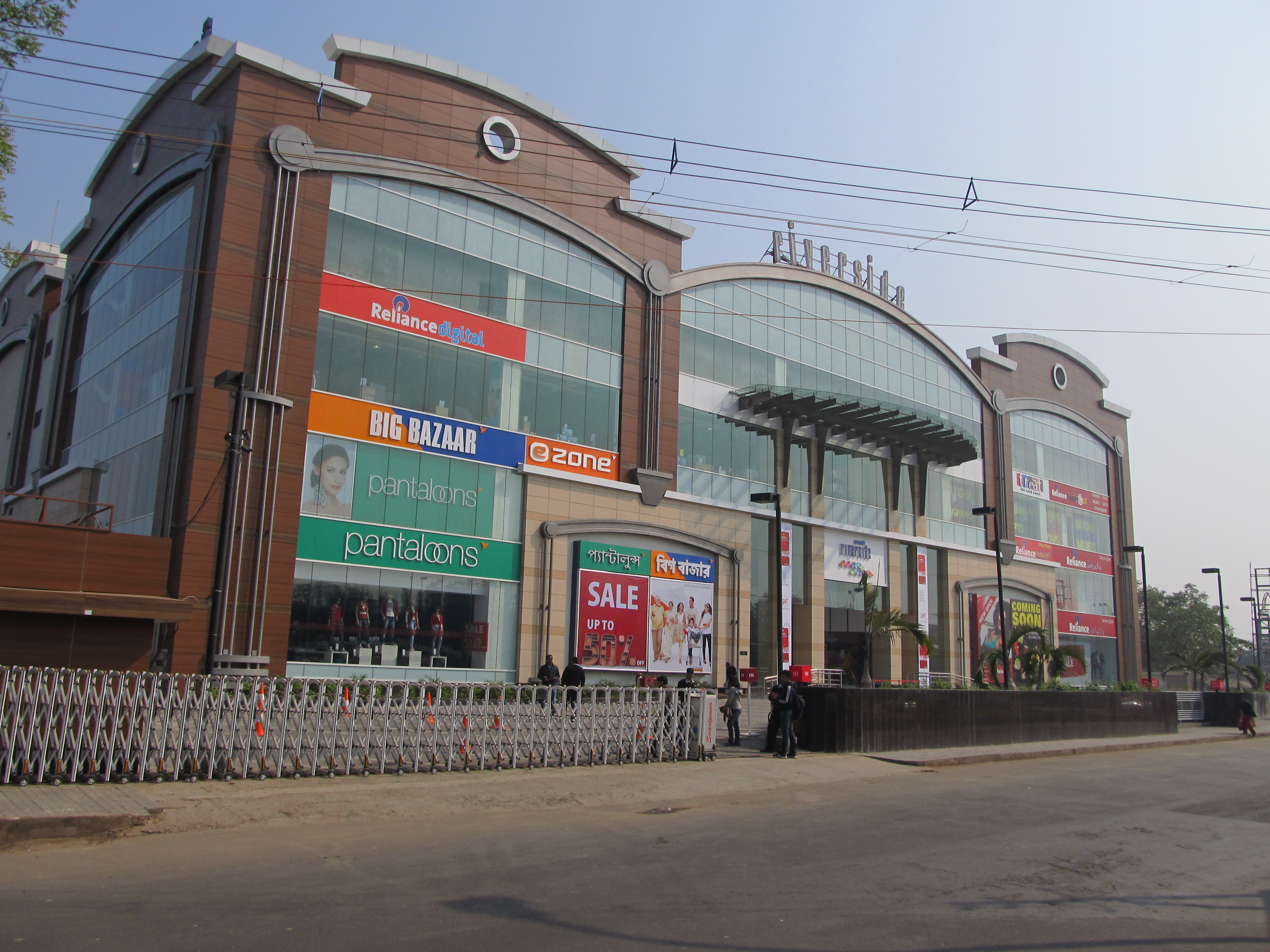
Avani Riverside Mall front view

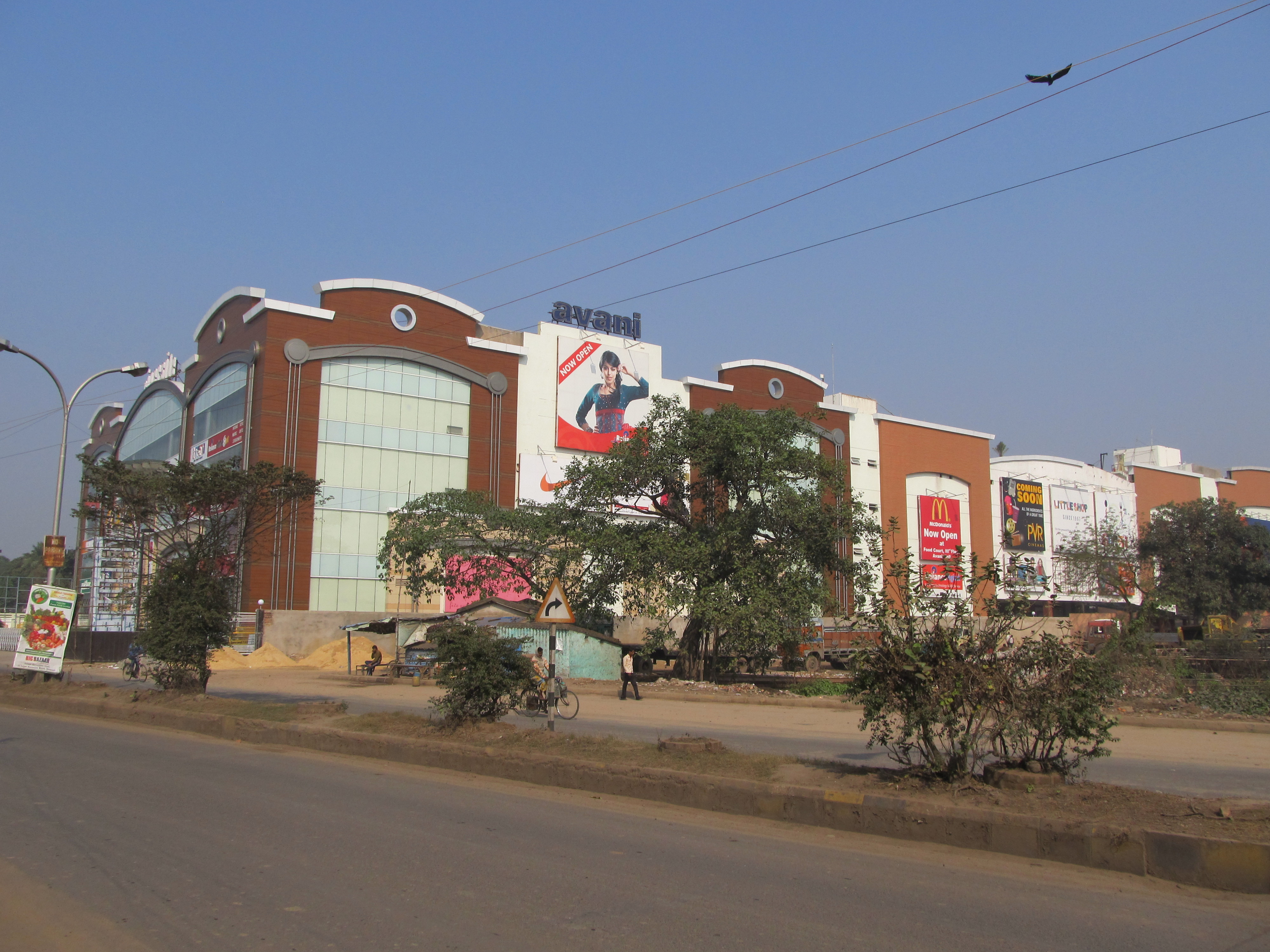
Avani Riverside Mall side view

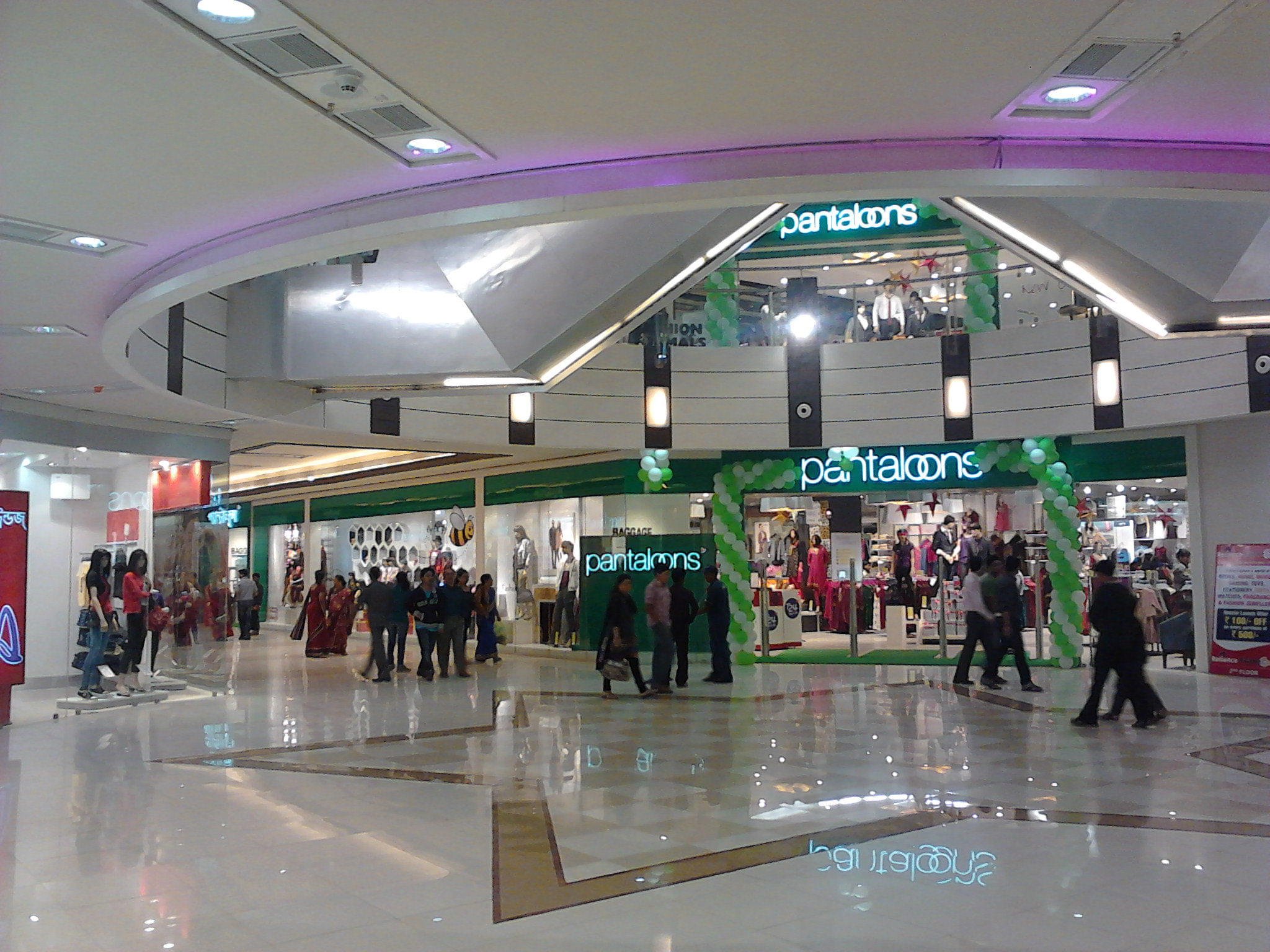
Entry view from inside

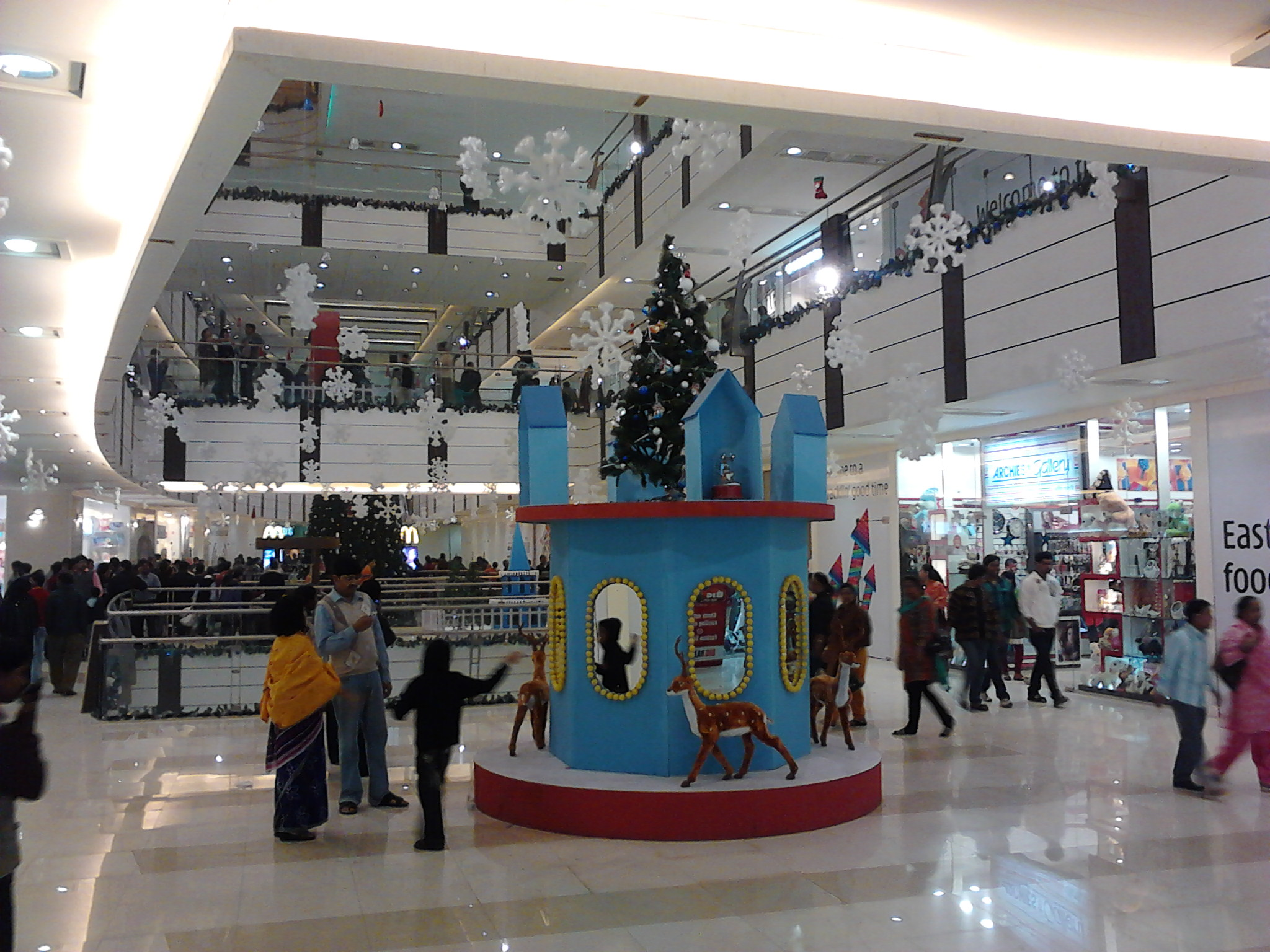
Interior of the mall, ground floor

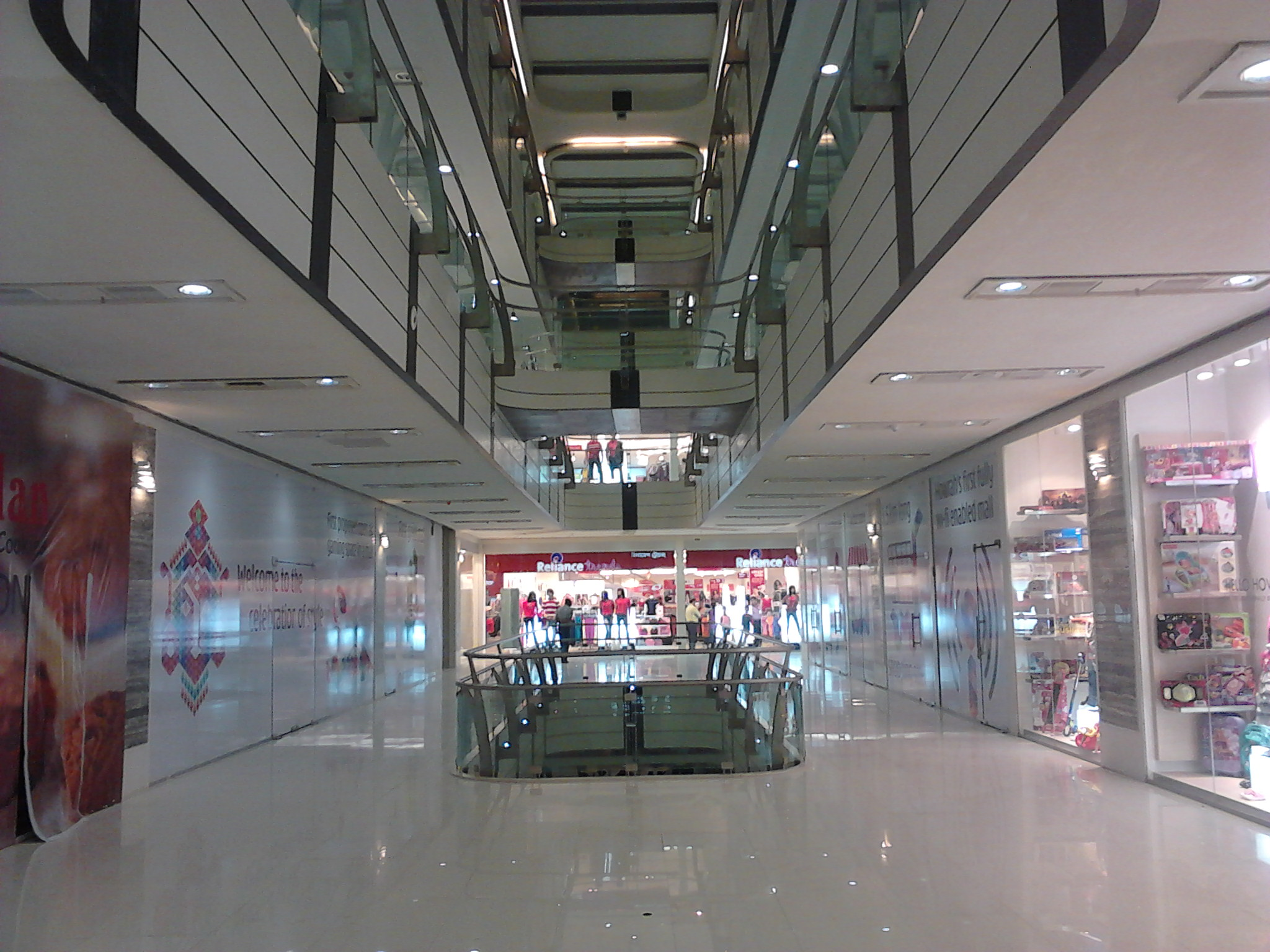
Interior of the mall, 1st floor

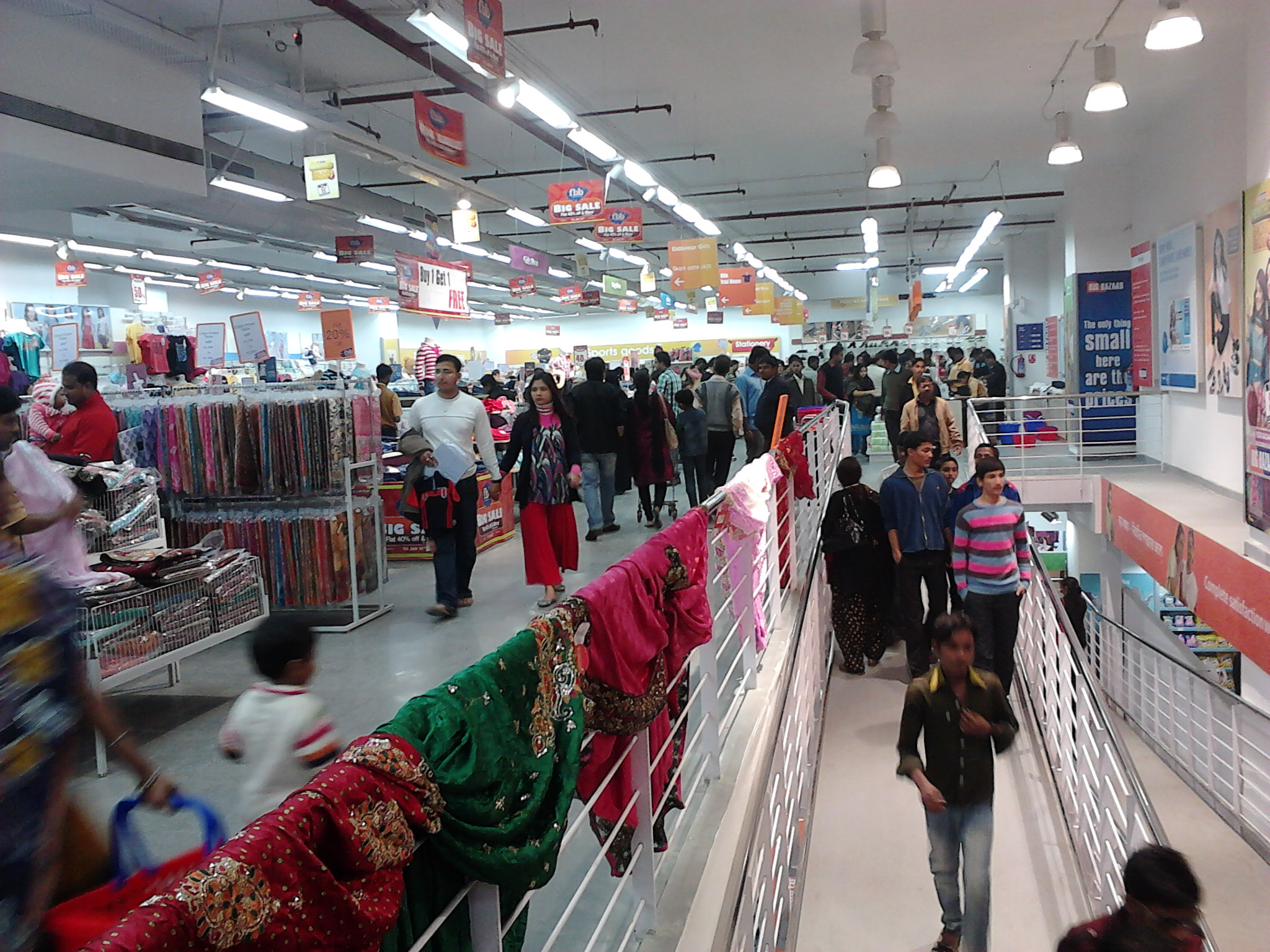
Big Bazaar in the mall

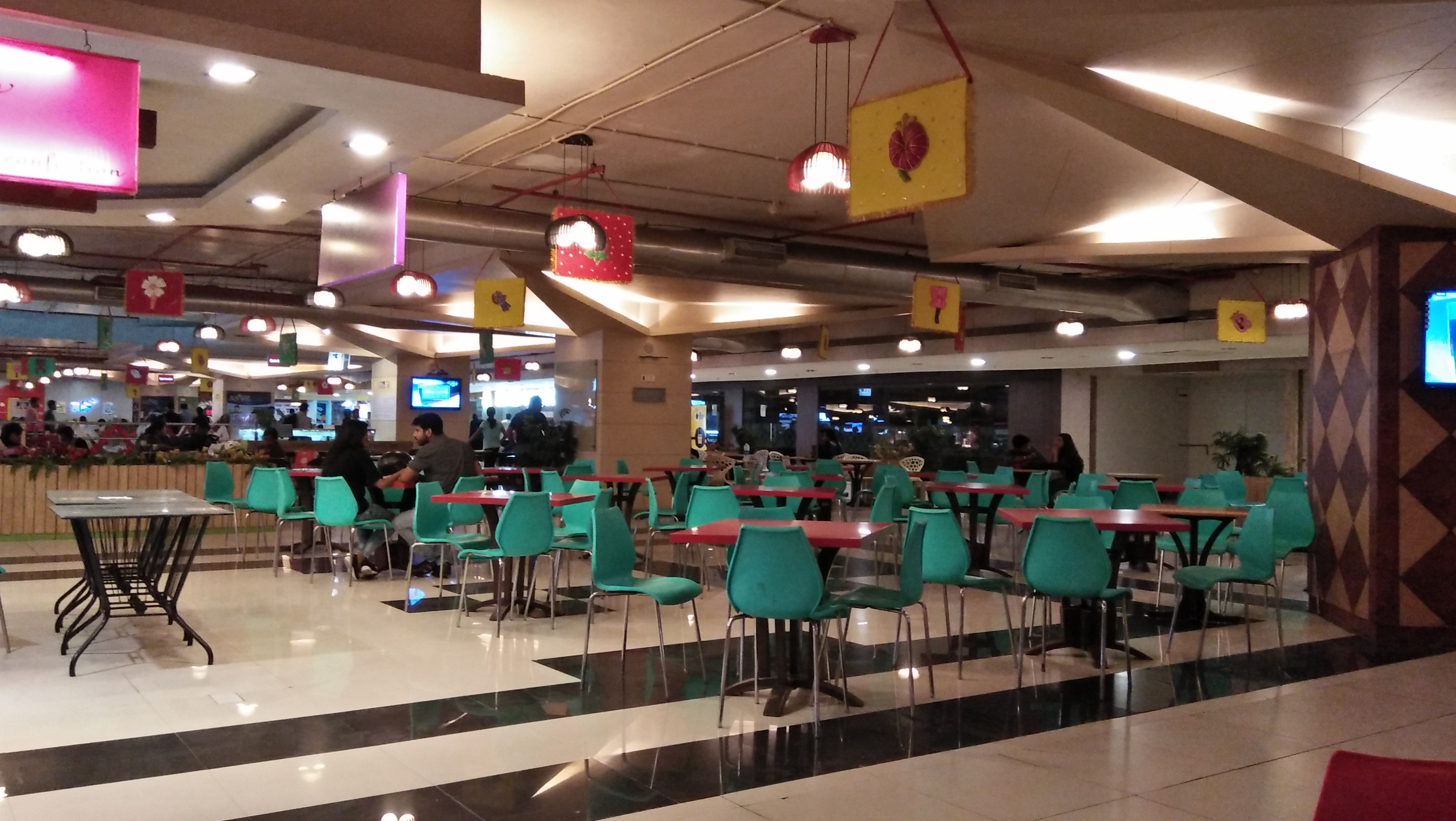
"Treat", food Court, 3rd floor.

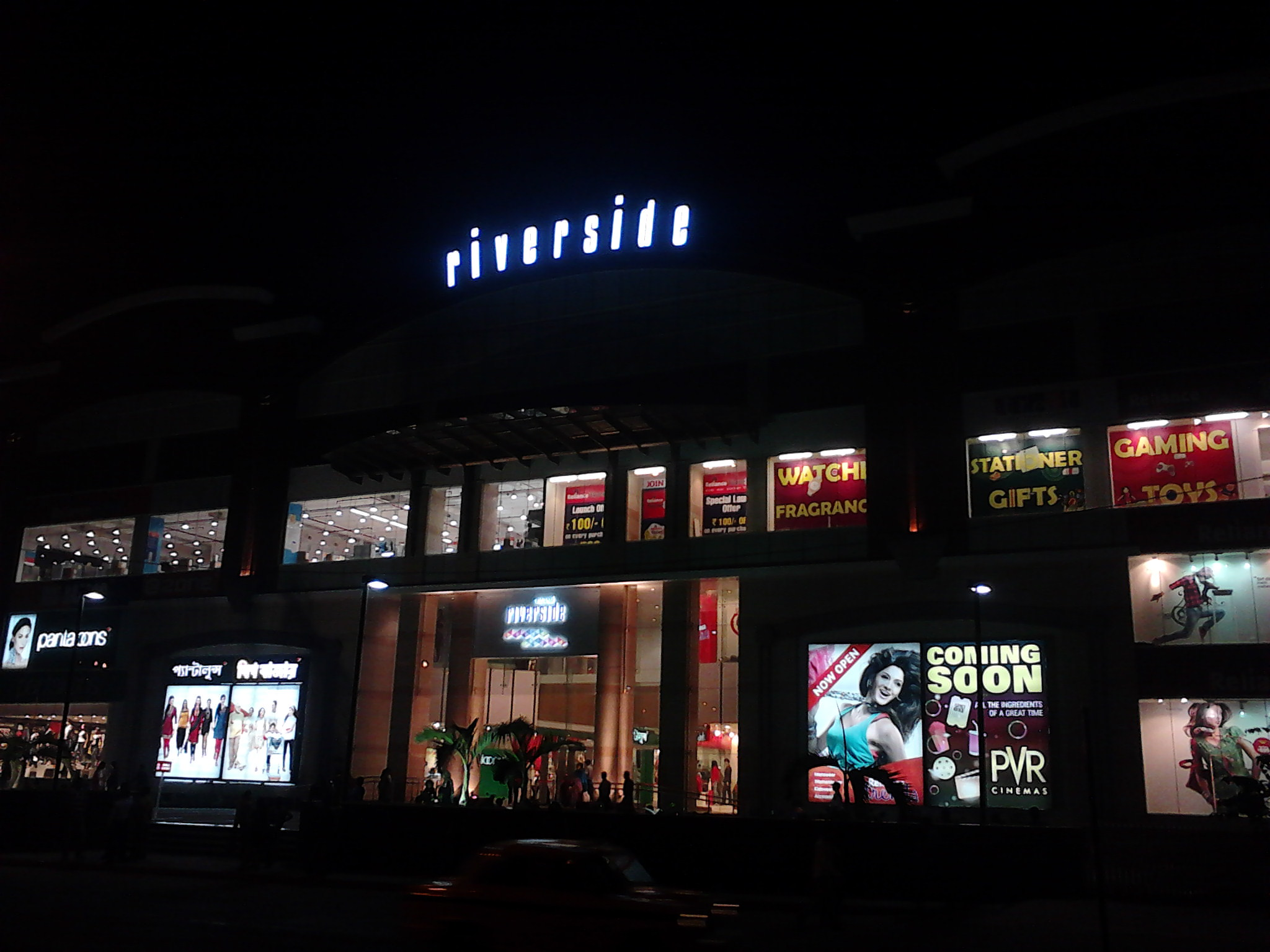
Night view of the Mall
