= Kishore Biyani =

Indian businessman

- Born: Bombay, Maharashtra, India
- Education: H.R. College; Bombay University
- Occupation: CEO of Future Group

Kishore Biyani is an Indian businessman who is the founder and CEO of Future Group, one of India's biggest brick-and-mortar retailers is also the founder of retail businesses such as Pantaloon Retail and Big Bazaar.

According to Forbes magazine, he had a net worth of US$1.78 billion in 2019.

== Retail career ==
=== Rise ===
Known for a thrifty approach in running his businesses, with precepts such as modest corporate travel and hospitality arrangements, Biyani has acknowledged the role of luck in his business success at this time, which he says was the coincidence of his ambitious ideas and the growth of an Indian middle-class with disposable income to spend. His success continued with the opening of a series of stores under the Big Bazaar brand name in 2001. These stores were deliberately designed to appear somewhat chaotic, like the traditional bazaars with which his customers were familiar. By 2009, and despite the worldwide economic downturn of 2008, there were over 100 of these stores across the country, serving over two million customers each week, while Pantaloon Retail employed over 30,000 people and had over 12,000,000 square feet (1,100,000 m^{2}) of retail space across 1000 stores in 71 cities. Turnover in 2008 was 47 billion rupees.

Biyani, who has admitted to making "whimsical decisions", had ignored the prevailing opinion of modelling retail businesses on those in the West and had instead concentrated on concepts that were familiar to India. His method of communication with both the media and financiers had been perceived as poor, as were his staff recruitment choices. Considered at first to be an extravagant risk-taker lacking in worthy business connections and shunned by his peers for all of these reasons, Biyani's success with Big Bazaar had turned him into a revered figure in the Indian retail sector and a magnet for media attention. He was running the largest retailer in the country and was named as retailer of the year by the National Retail Federation, which at one earlier point had refused even to admit him. He was, however, facing a threat from the much larger resources of conglomerates such as Aditya Birla Group and Reliance Industries, both of which had signalled an intention to move into the retail sector.

He received the EY Entrepreneur of the Year Award (2018) for the Business Transformation Category.

In 2026, Biyani co-founded The Foundery, a 90-day startup incubator, alongside entrepreneur Nikhil Kamath, marking his return to business activity following the collapse of Future Group. Future Retail, which had entered insolvency proceedings, saw lease termination notices served on approximately 835 of its stores.

=== Decline ===
In addition to the threat posed by the conglomerates, the 2008 economic downturn affected Biyani's business and methods. There were postponements in planned expansion and downsizing in some areas. Unlike other Indian retail chains, such as Shoppers Stop, that used a small amount of short-term borrowing and then financed growth through cash generated internally from sales, he had relied heavily on short-term borrowing for expansion and also diversification into numerous retail areas, including book-selling and salons.

Biyani reacted to the crisis with measures such as a considerable reduction in the number of his mid-level management staff and a restructuring of his corporate interests. He appointed a cousin, Rakesh Biyani, more methodical and patient than himself, to take over his responsibility for the retail business and, in particular, to resolve issues with the poor supply chain and internal distribution logistics that had resulted from rapid expansion. He also rolled-over debt, converting it into loans that would mature in three to five years' time, and pulled out of joint venture deals with companies such as Etam. In addition, he reduced the scope, concentrating on four retail formats — fashion, food, home, and general merchandise — rather than the 22 or more with which he had previously been involved. Despite his previous disparagement of the need for the professional advice of others, Biyani turned to McKinsey and Company for assistance and also divested control to senior staff who had been recruited from large businesses such as PepsiCo. Things appeared to be improving after the initial shockwave of 2008.

Nonetheless, by April 2012, Biyani's business empire, including the non-retail elements, w performing less than its competitors and there were concerns raised about its debt levels. He announced that there were plans for a further restructuring of parts of the business to enable it to become debt-free by March 2013. A controlling stake in Pantaloon Retail was acquired by Aditya Birla Nuovo Ltd in May 2012 in a complex deal involving a demerger of the business from the wider group, and there were subsequent further dilutions of Biyani's involvement in the business. In 2016, it was renamed as Aditya Birla Fashion and Retail Ltd.

In August 2020, it was announced that Reliance Retail had reached a deal to acquire the retail and wholesale business of Future Group at $3.4 Billion. In 2022, around 200 retail stores of Future Group such as Big Bazaar, were replaced by Smart Bazaar across the nation and many ended up just shutting down.

In April 2024, Biyani sold his oldest SOBO Central Mall, Mumbai, to K Raheja Corp at a settlement of Rs. 476 crore.

In May 2026, the Indian Market Regulator, SEBI, imposed a monetary penalty on Kishore Biyani for violations of listing, disclosure norms, and governance lapses.

== Other business interests ==
Through the Future Group , Biyani expanded into several business sectors, including insurance and media. The group has also operated in financial services through Future Capital business, agriculture through Future Agrovet, and electronic retail through the eZone chain. Its retail brands Big Bazaar and Food Bazaar targeted cost-conscious consumers and have been compared to Wal-mart. The company has also recruited senior executives from firms such as ICICI and Reliance Industries.

Biyani has also had a foray into Bollywood, underwriting the critically panned box-office failure Na Tum Jaano Na Hum and Chura Liya Hai Tumne that were released in 2002 and 2003 respectively.

== Books ==
- With Dipayan Baishya, Biyani co-authored the book It Happened in India: The Story of Pantaloons, Big Bazaar, Central and The Great Indian Consumer. As of 2007, it was the best-selling business book ever published in India, with sales of over 100,000.
