= Louis Philippe (disambiguation) =

Louis Philippe may refer to:

== People ==
=== French House of Orléans ===
- Louis Philippe I, Duke of Orléans 'le Gros' (1725–1785)
  - Louis Philippe II, Duke of Orléans (1747–1793), his son
    - Louis-Philippe I, King of the French (1773–1850), his son, last King of France
      - Louis Philippe, Crown Prince of Belgium (1833–1834), his grandson
      - Prince Philippe, Count of Paris (1838–1894), his grandson, called King Louis Philippe II by some factions
        - Luís Filipe, Prince Royal of Portugal (1887–1908), his grandson

=== Others ===
- Louis Philippe, comte de Ségur (1753–1830), French diplomat and historian
- Louis-Philippe Pelletier (1857–1921), Canadian politician
- Louis-Philippe Brodeur (1862–1924), Canadian politician
- Louis-Philippe Pigeon (1905–1986), Canadian jurist
- Louis-Philippe de Grandpré (1917–2008), Canadian jurist
- Louis Philippe (musician) (born 1959), French indie pop musician

== Other ==
- Louis Philippe (brand), an Indian brand of men's apparel

== See also ==
- Louis Phillips (disambiguation)
