= Fashion Factory =

Chain of retail stores operated by Reliance Retail

Brand Factory

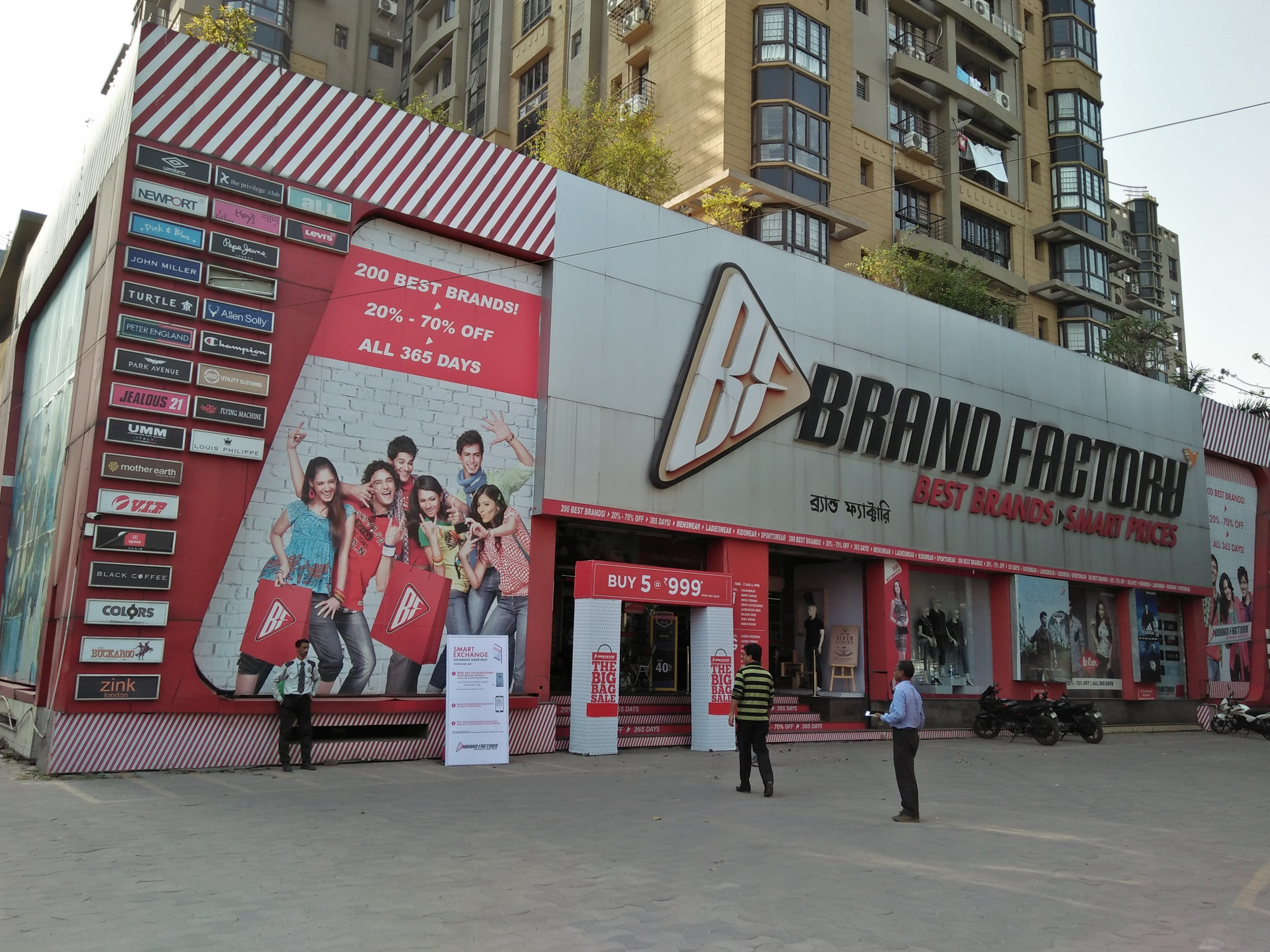
- Brand Factory
- Formerly: Brand Factory
- Type: Private
- Industry: Retailing
- Founded: 2006
- Headquarters: Mumbai, Maharashtra, India
- Number of locations: 81
- Area served: India
- Products: Apparel, Footwear
- Parent: Reliance Retail
- Website: reliancefashionfactorystores.com//

Brand Factory is a chain of retail stores operated by Reliance Retail. It was formerly operated by Future Group. It offers a wide range of apparel brands in different categories for men, women, infants, accessories, cosmetics, footwear, sportswear, and luggage. Launched in September 2006 as Brand Factory, it had 100 stores across 50 cities in India in December 2018. It was India's largest discount retail chain at the time. The chain had planned to expand its number of outlets to 100 by 2018. In 2022, it was acquired by Reliance Industries and rebranded as Fashion Factory.

== Outlets ==
The outlets are between 10,000 and 150,000 square feet in size and hosted several Indian and International fashion brands like Buffalo, Jack & Jones, Levis, Pepe Jeans, Wrangler, Provogue, Arrow, Nike, Adidas, Reebok, Raymond, Louis Phillippe, Ed Hardy, Allen Solly, Lee Cooper, WROGN, and Gini & Jony. It has 81 outlets across India.
