= Louis Phillips =

Louis Phillips may refer to:

- Lou Diamond Phillips (born 1962), actor
- Lou Phillips (1878–1916), rugby player
- Louis Phillips (rancher) (1829–1900)
- Louis Phillips (author) (born 1942)
- Louis Phillips (cricketer) (born 1883, date of death unknown), Jamaican cricketer

== See also ==
- Louis Philippe (disambiguation)
