= Gini & Jony =

Indian kid's fashion brand

Gini & Joni Limited
- Industry: Textiles, Apparel, and Luxury Goods
- Founded: 1980
- Founder: Prakash Lakhani, Jay Lakhani, Anil Lakhani
- Headquarters: Mumbai, Maharashtra; India
- Key people: Prakash Lakhani (Chairman), Jaikishan H. Lakhani (Executive Director), Anil J. Lakhani (Chief Operating Officer), Harsh Agarwal (CEO)
- Products: Apparel
- Number of employees: 2,012 (2011)
- Website: www.giniandjony.com

Gini & Jony is an Indian kid's fashion brand, promoted by the Lakhani brothers, since 1980. The brand sells apparel through a mix of company-owned and franchisee outlets, and is currently present in 106 cities with 200 exclusive brand outlets and other large format multi-brand stores, like Shoppers Stop, Lifestyle Stores, Pantaloons etc. While the promoter group holds the majority stake in the organization..

== History ==
Gini & Jony was founded in 1980 by Prakash Lakhani. In November 2024, Gini & Jony was acquired by Suditi Industries, a textile and garment manufacturer, for an undisclosed amount.

In April 2025, Harsh Agarwal was appointed as the Chief Executive Officer (CEO) of the company.
