= Trendin =

Online fashion subsidiary

the_samson_s
- Company type: Private
- Industry: Internet
- Founded: 2013
- Headquarters: Bangalore, India
- Key people: Shivanandan Pare (CEO)
- Products: Apparel & Accessories
- Services: India
- Parent: Madura Garments Lifestyle and Retail Co Ltd. (2013 - 2015); Aditya Birla Fashion and Retail Ltd.(2015 - Present)
- Website: www.trendin.com

Trendin.com was the online arm of Madura Fashion & Lifestyle (MFL)., a subsidiary of Aditya Birla Nuvo Limited (amalgamated), now a part of Aditya Birla Fashion and Retail Limited. The website offered online apparel and accessories collection for men, women and children from brands distributed by MFL.

It delivered clothing to over 13,600 pin codes within India. Brands offered included Louis Philippe , Allen Solly, Van Heusen, People, Peter England and Pantaloons. Trendin.com also offered personalization options with Van Heusen's My Fit for women and men.

== History ==
Headquartered in Bangalore, Trendin.com went live on 18 March 2013, with a founding team of six members. It currently employs 100 people.

In 2015, Aditya Birla Group de-merged the Madura Fashion (the branded apparel retailing division) and Madura Lifestyle (luxury branded apparel retailing division) from Aditya Birla Nuvo Limited (ABNL) and amalgamate them with Pantaloons.

In 2016, Aditya Birla confirmed that the online retail platform will be spun off into separate portals, and it plans to have separate ecommerce websites for its five labels — Louis Philippe, Allen Solly, Van Heusen, Peter England and People.
