= Justdial =

Indian Internet technology company

Just Dial Limited
- Trade name: Justdial
- Formerly: A&M Communications Private Limited (1993–2006); Just Dial Private Limited (2006–2011)
- Type: Public
- Traded as: NSE: JUSTDIAL; BSE: 535648
- ISIN: INE599M01018
- Industry: Local search engine; Internet
- Founded: 1996; 30 years ago
- Founder: V. S. S. Mani
- Headquarters: Mumbai, Maharashtra, India
- Area served: India
- Key people: Dinkar Ayilavarapu (CEO); Dinesh Taluja (CFO)
- Services: Local search
- Revenue: ▲₹12.13 billion (FY26)
- Net income: ▲₹4.97 billion (FY26)
- Number of employees: 13,070 (March 2026)
- Parent: Reliance Retail
- Website: www.justdial.com

Justdial is an Indian internet technology company that provides local search for different services in India over the phone, website and mobile apps. Founded in 1996 by V. S. S. Mani, the company is headquartered in Mumbai, India. In addition to its headquarters, Justdial has offices in Ahmedabad, Bangalore, Chandigarh, Chennai, Coimbatore, New Delhi, Hyderabad, Jaipur, Kolkata, and Pune. On 16 July 2021, Reliance Retail acquired a 66.95% stake in Justdial for ₹34.97 billion (US$473.09 million). As of 31 March 2026, Just Dial reported a workforce of 13,070 employees, a database of 54.7 million business listings, and 631,530 active paid campaigns.

== History ==
In 1987, while working for a yellow pages company, V. S. S. Mani thought of replacing yellow pages with a database of information that users could call to receive current information about local business listings. To launch his venture, Mani acquired the Mumbai landline phone number 2888-8888. After several years of seeking financial backing for his idea, Mani launched Justdial in 1996 with a seed capital of ₹50,000 (equivalent to ₹300,000 or US$3,100 in 2026), five employees, a few rented computers, and borrowed furniture.

In 2007, an Internet and mobile app version of the database called Justdial.com was launched.

On 20 May 2013, Justdial went public at a price between ₹897 (US$15.31) and ₹898 (US$15.32). Of the total 17.5 million shares, 13.5 million of them were offered to the public, while the rest were given to fifteen previous investors at ₹530 (US$9.04) per share. To encourage retail investment, Justdial had promised that they would buy back shares from retail investors at the IPO price if Justdial's share price fell sharply within the first six months. By the close of the market on the day of the IPO, the majority of new investments had come from foreign institutional investors. On 5 August of the next year, Justdial's share price reached a high of ₹1,894.7 (US$32.33), subsequently decreasing to the triple digits in 2015. On 16 July 2021, Reliance Retail acquired a 66.95% stake in JustDial for ₹34.97 billion (US$473.09 million). As per the deal, Reliance Retail will hold 40.95 percent, and will make an open offer to acquire up to 26 percent in accordance with takeover regulations. The deal also mentioned that Justdial will allow Reliance access to the 25-year-old listings company's merchant database and Mani will continue to lead Justdial as managing director and chief executive officer.

== Products and services ==
Justdial's service is a database of business listings that users can access by phone or online. The company also operates "Justdial Social", a service that aggregates content from social media websites, TV broadcast, news, and other sources; and "Search Plus Service", a service that manages online transactions via the web and mobile apps.

== Security flaws ==
On 10 October 2019, Indian-based independent security researcher Ehraz Ahmed detected a major security flaw in eleadmarket's Register API. The flaw allowed competent hackers to log into any eleadmarket account by simply placing the phone number in the username parameter. By doing so, this granted the hacker access to any person's Justdial account. This vulnerability puts the user's personal data at risk, but also compromises the user's social profile since the hacker could use the system ID generated by exploiting the flaw to access the JustDial Pay account, and post on the user's social profile. Justdial acknowledged that there was a bug in one of its API. There was no loss of any data or financial loss reported.

== Acquisition ==
Justdial was acquired By Reliance on July 20, 2021. On 20 July 2021, RRVL acquired 13.1 million equity shares of ₹10 (US$0.14) each of Justdial for ₹1,020 (US$13.8) per equity share from VSS Mani, founder and chief executive of Just Dial, in a block deal.

== See also ==
- Local search (Internet)
- Local advertising
- Online advertising
