= Na Tum Jaano Na Hum =

2002 Indian Hindi-language romantic drama film

- Movie poster
- Directed by: Arjun Sablok
- Written by: Arjun Sablok
- Produced by: Kishore Biyani
- Starring: Saif Ali Khan; Hrithik Roshan; Esha Deol
- Cinematography: Manoj Soni
- Edited by: Shirish Kunder
- Music by: Songs: Rajesh Roshan; Background Score: Raju Singh
- Production company: PFH Entertainment Limited
- Release date: 10 May 2002
- Running time: 158 minutes
- Country: India
- Language: Hindi
- Budget: ₹14 crore
- Box office: ₹19.29 crore

Na Tum Jaano Na Hum (transl. Neither you know nor I) is a 2002 Indian Hindi-language romance film directed by Arjun Sablok. The film stars Saif Ali Khan, Hrithik Roshan, and Esha Deol. This was the first film which featured Khan and Roshan together. The title of the film was taken from a song from Roshan's debut film Kaho Naa... Pyaar Hai (2000). Upon release, it received negative reviews and was a box office failure.

== Plot ==
Esha Malhotra is a bright, spirited girl who has just left college. She finds a note from a past student of her school that coincides with her own feelings of love. She calls into a radio station and requests a song, repeating the words left on the note. An anonymous man calls in soon after, stating that he is the one who had written the letter and he would like to meet her someday since they seem to have the same feelings about love and other aspects of life. The radio announcer sets up a date and time for their meeting at the radio station. The man arrives but finds only a letter waiting for him. The letter does not state her name or address, only a postbox number to which she requests him to write so that they can be friends. The correspondence begins with Rahul also arranging his postbox number and they starts exchanging letters in their respective postbox numbers. The man turns out to be a photographer and commercial pilot Rahul Sharma. They do not meet, exchange numbers, or tell their names but continue to write to each other. In one such letter exchange Rahul shares his birthday date with Esha along with them sharing a toy plane from Rahul's side and a teddy Tutu from Esha's side. Fate brings the two together when Esha hires Rahul to be their photographer for a campaign where he accidentally shares his birthday date with her and she gets reminded of her mystery man. Of course, she didn't know it was him, nor did he know that it was her. The two bond over time and turn friends without knowing they are writing letters to each other only.

Esha's grandfather wants her to get married, and thus he arranges for her to meet Akshay Kapoor, a flirt and womaniser who also happens to be Rahul's best friend. It is revealed that Rahul agreed to lead Esha's campaign only to make Akshay agree for their marriage if Rahul finds her a suitable match for the former enraging her. But the duo makes up soon. Esha who has fallen in love with her pen pal does not want to marry Akshay. However, Akshay is falling for Esha. A lovestruck Rahul arranges to meet the one to whom he writes letters. Much to his shock though, he finds out it is Esha and leaves Tutu with her. Because of his friendship with Akshay, who is deeply in love with Esha, Rahul decides to sacrifice his love. Esha decides to contact her mystery man once again and sends Tutu to Rahul again. However, for Akshay's sake and to make Esha forget about himself, Rahul calls Esha for last time as the mystery man and asks Esha to forget him. Esha, unable to contact her anonymous love, agrees to wed Akshay but vows to wait for her mystery man. Rahul without even telling Akshay leaves for Vancouver secretly the day before the wedding, vowing never to be seen again and cuts himself off from everyone.

Four years later, in a mall in Canada, Rahul during his Indian bridal photography exhibition accidentally meets Akshay, who now has a son, also named Rahul. Akshay confronts him about disappearing suddenly and his efforts to find him all these years. Rahul thinks he is about to meet Esha but instead meets Akshay's former girlfriend Tanya, who is now his wife. Akshay explains that he could not marry Esha in the end because she still loves her mystery writer. Suddenly, a group of workers in the mall carry in a large portrait of Esha's bridal photoshoot done by Rahul during their campaign, and Akshay realises that Rahul is the mystery writer Esha fell in love with and sacrificed his love for their friendship. He urges Rahul to hurry back to India, so Rahul does so and reunites with Esha by showing her Tutu which he kept with him all these years.

== Cast ==
- Saif Ali Khan as Akshay Kapoor
- Hrithik Roshan as Rahul Sharma
- Esha Deol as Esha Malhotra
- Alok Nath as Sanjay Malhotra, Esha's grandfather
- Ashima Bhalla as Tanya
- Rati Agnihotri as Maya, Esha's aunt
- Moushumi Chatterjee as Mrs. Malhotra, Esha's mother
- Shilarna Vaze as Riya, Esha's Best friend
- Anang Desai as Mr. Roshan Kapoor, Akshay's father
- Smita Jaykar as Mrs. Kapoor, Akshay's mother
- Shilpa Saklani as Tina (Special appearance)

== Soundtrack ==
According to the Indian trade website Box Office India, with around 9,00,000 units sold, this film's soundtrack album was the year's fifteenth highest-selling.

Na Tum Jaano Na Hum

Soundtrack album by Rajesh Roshan
- Released: 2002
- Genre: Feature film soundtrack
- Language: Hindi
- Label: Saregama-His Master's Voice

All lyrics are written by Anand Bakshi.

Track listing
No.	Title	Singer(s)	Length
1.	"Jaa Sanam Mujhko Hai"	Kamaal Khan, Sneha Pant	06:58
2.	"Hai Ram Ye Kya Kar Daala (Not in the film)"	Abhijeet, Pamela Jain	05:55
3.	"Ye Betiyan To Babul Ki"	Jaspinder Narula	04:19
4.	"Dil Leke Jaan Leke"	Udit Narayan, Pamela Jain	06:51
5.	"Tum Meri Baahon Mein Aa Na Sake"	Kamaal Khan	05:53
6.	"Aha Aha"	Falguni Pathak	04:51
7.	"Chunariya"	Sukhwinder Singh, Udit Narayan	07:16
8.	"Hai Ram Ye Kya Kar Daala – II (Not in the film)"	Abhijeet, Pamela Jain	05:57

== Reception ==
The film, which was funded by retail magnate Kishore Biyani, was a critical and commercial failure.

Taran Adarsh of IndiaFM gave the film 1 out of 5, writing, "On the whole, NA TUM JAANO NA HUM has some moments for the classes, but not much for the masses." Bhavna Giani of Rediff.com wrote, "First-time director Arjun Sablok does nothing spectacular with the movie. Perhaps the only worthwhile mention is the song Aha aha, where he does something different with its visualisation."
