= Centro (store) =

Indian department store chain

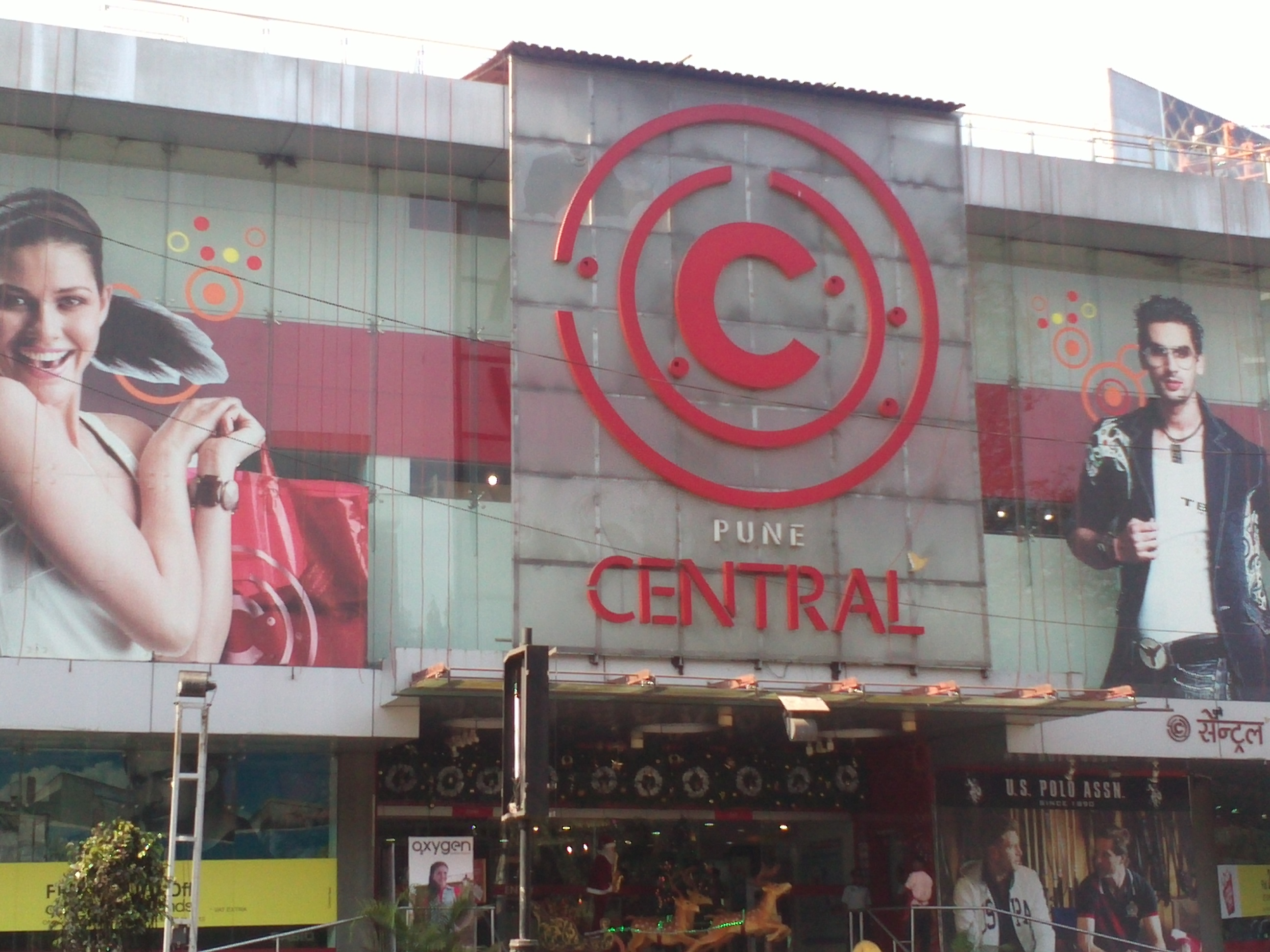
Former Pune Central, Bund Garden, Pune

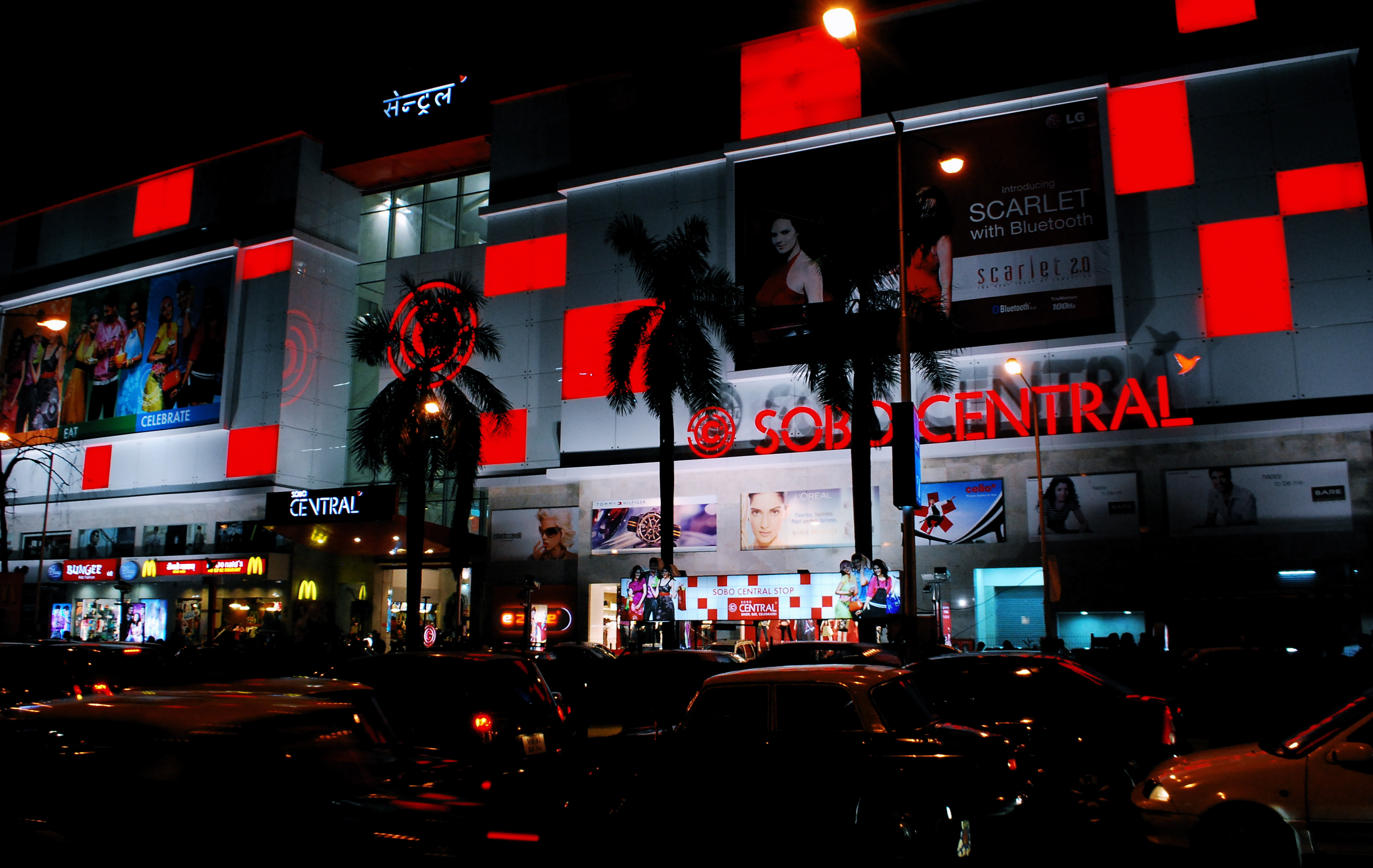
Former SoBo Central at Crossroads Mall, Mahalaxmi, Mumbai

Centro, also called Reliance Centro and formerly Central, is an Indian department store chain operated by Reliance Retail. It was formerly operated by Future Lifestyle Fashion of Future Group. It competes with other department store chains such as Lifestyle and Shoppers Stop.

== Outlets ==
Central opened its first store in Bangalore in 2004.

In 2022, Reliance took over 34 Central stores after Future Group failed to make payments for their leases. These stores were rebranded as Centro.

Centro operates over 33 outlets across 24 locations in India and plans to add more stores in the future.
