= Nilgiris 1905 =

Indian supermarket chain

Nilgiri's
- Type: Private
- Genre: Supermarket chain
- Founded: 1905; 121 years ago as The Nilgiri Dairy Farm Ltd. (Coonoor, British India)
- Founder: Muthusamy Mudaliar
- Headquarters: Whitefield, Bengaluru - Corporate Office

Nilgiri's is an Indian supermarket chain. It is also one of the oldest supermarket chains in India with origins dating back to 1905 and hence its products are sold under the brand name of "Nilgiri's 1905". It also has a store brand, and produces dairy, baked goods, chocolates, and other products under the same name.

== History ==
The origin of this supermarket chain can be traced back to Muthuswamy Mudaliar of Erode district. Muthuswamy Mudaliar was a mail runner for the British in colonial India. He carried letters and cheques for the British from Coimbatore to the hill stations of Ooty and Coonoor. As he was flooded with requests to carry dairy products and other items, he opened a small shop in 1905, after buying the butter business of an Englishman in Vannarpet and soon, "The Nilgiri Dairy Farm Ltd." was established.

In 1936, he moved his shop to Brigade Road, Bangalore. The Nilgiri Dairy Farm Ltd. specialized in dairy, dairy products, bakery and chocolates. In 1962, Nilgiris set up a specialized dairy plant in Erode. This pasteurization plant was used to manufacture Nilgiri's'store brand of dairy product. The produce was supplied to Bangalore on a daily basis from Erode. Muthusamy's son Chenniappan expanded the company by setting up a modest store in Bangalore to sell Nilgiris' own brand of products. However, after Chenniappan's visit to the United States and Europe, he expanded the store into a larger supermarket. Though Chenniappan was influenced by the supermarket concept in the U.S. and Europe, he developed the Nilgiris supermarket to fit in with the local culture and set guidelines for its growth. Soon, the Nilgiris supermarket chain spread to Erode, Coimbatore and Chennai.

In September–October 2008, Actis, a UK-based private equity investor, invested US$65 million in the Nilgiris Group in order to strengthen the group's manufacturing and franchising operations in South India. This investment has given Actis a controlling interest (more than 51% stake) in the Nilgiris group. On 21 November 2014, Future Consumer Enterprises Ltd. acquired the 98% from Actis Capital and other promoters.

In August 2023, Future Consumer Enterprises sold Nilgiri's to AVA Cholayil Health Care for a consideration of ₹67 crore.
