= Louis Philippe (brand) =

Indian men's clothing brand

- Product type: Men's apparel
- Current owner: Madura Fashion & Lifestyle
- Produced by: Aditya Birla Fashion and Retail
- Country: India
- Introduced: 1989
- Markets: Worldwide
- Ambassador: Robert Pattinson
- Tagline: The Upper Crest
- Website: https://www.louisphilippe.com/

Louis Philippe is a premium brand of men's apparel originating from India. It is a subsidiary of Madura Fashion & Lifestyle. It is a division of the Indian conglomerate Aditya Birla Group, and was founded in 1989. Named after Louis Philippe, King of France from 1830 to 1848, the brand is one of the largest apparel brands in India, as of 2018.

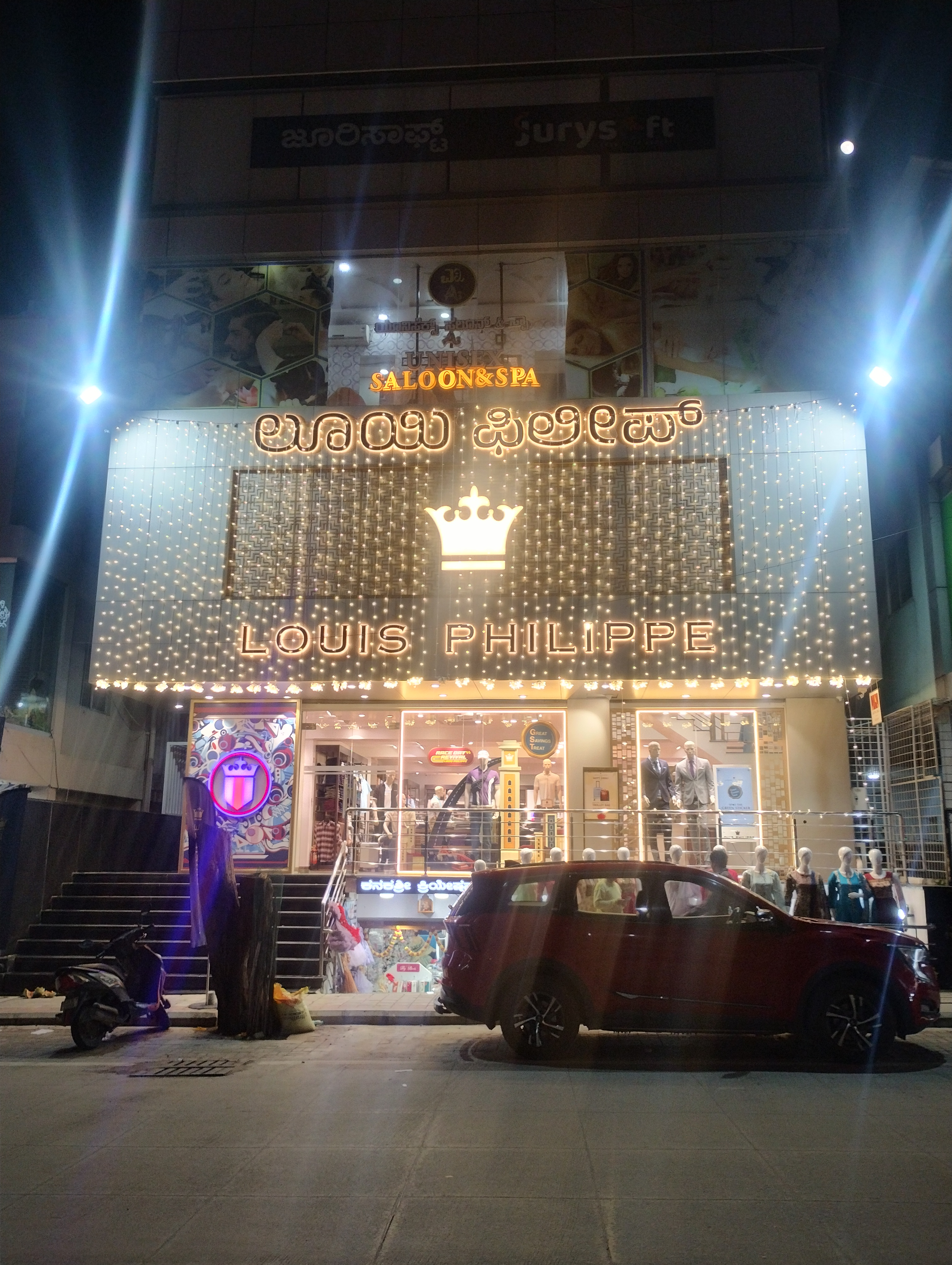
A Louis Philippe shop decorated on the eve of Navaratri, in RR Nagar, Bangalore (2025)
