= JioMart =

Indian e-commerce company

- Website type: E-commerce
- Available in: Hindi, English
- Founded: December 2019; 6 years ago
- Owner: Reliance Retail
- Founder: Mukesh Ambani
- Industry: E-commerce
- Services: Online shopping
- Employees: 10,000 (2020)
- Parent: Jio Platforms
- Website: www.jiomart.com

JioMart is an Indian e-commerce platform, owned by Reliance Retail. Launched in 2019, it initially focused on online groceries before expanding into other categories such as fashion, home essentials, electronics, and lifestyle products by adopting a marketplace model.

== History ==
The platform was soft-launched in December 2019. A pilot was initially launched in select areas of Navi Mumbai, Thane and Kalyan in April 2020. In May 2020, JioMart was fully launched in 200 cities and towns across India. Within only a few days of its launch, the JioMart app surpassed one million downloads.

In October 2020, JioMart signed an agreement with Infibeam Avenues. Under this deal, Jio will use Infibeam's solutions to power its e-commerce and digital payments services.

In August 2022, JioMart signed an agreement with Meta to launch first-ever end-to-end shopping experience on WhatsApp. Under this deal, Jio will use WhatsApp's chat solutions to power its grocery shopping service in India.

In June 2024, JioMart entered quick-commerce by claiming to deliver groceries in under an hour.
