= Reliance Digital =

Indian consumer electronics retailer

- Type: Subsidiary
- Industry: Consumer electronics retail
- Founded: 24 April 2007; 19 years ago
- Headquarters: Mumbai, Maharashtra, India
- Area served: India
- Key people: Brian Bade (Chief Executive, since Aug 2010)
- Products: Consumer electronics, smartphones, home appliances, laptops, wearable devices, accessories
- Services: Electronics retail, e-commerce, installation, maintenance, after-sales support
- Owner: Reliance Industries
- Parent: Reliance Retail
- Divisions: MyJio Store, resQ, Bismi Connect, JioMart Digital, Jio Mart Electronics
- Website: www.reliancedigital.in

Reliance Digital is an Indian consumer electronics retail chain operated by Reliance Retail, a subsidiary of Reliance Industries. Established on 24 April 2007, the company sells consumer electronics, home appliances, and digital products through its retail stores and online platform across India.

== History ==
Reliance Digital was established as part of Reliance Industries' broader expansion into the organized retail sector through Reliance Retail. The company opened its first store in New Delhi on 24 April 2007, marking Reliance Retail’s entry into the consumer electronics segment.

The company later expanded into multiple retail formats, including large-format electronics stores and smaller telecom-focused outlets operating under the Digital Xpress and Digital Xpress Mini brands. Following the launch of Jio services, several Digital Xpress Mini outlets were rebranded as MyJio Stores. Reliance Digital opened its first store on 24 April 2007 in Delhi.

In 2011, the company launched a private-label consumer electronics and home appliances brand named Reconnect.

In July 2026, the company partnered with Dell Technologies to bring the Dell XPS 13 to its retail stores and online platform in India.

== Operations ==
Reliance Digital distributes consumer electronics, including smartphones, televisions, laptops, home appliances, and wearable technology. The chain functions as part of Reliance Retail's omnichannel framework, integrating physical retail locations with its e-commerce platform.

Reliance Retail's consumer electronics network spans more than 850 cities across major states and union territories. The footprint comprises over 700 Reliance Digital electronics locations alongside approximately 900 MyJio Store. The company also manages resQ, after-sales service division that provides installation, maintenance, and repair services for home appliances and personal devices. Additionally, Reliance Digital operates Apple-authorized reseller outlets in select markets under the iStore brand.

== LYF ==
Reliance Digital also carries the LYF brand of 4G smartphones. These phones were launched in January 2016. So far, five phones have been launched – Earth 1, Water 1, Water 2, Wind 6 and Flame 1.

== See also ==
- Reliance Industries
- Reliance Retail
