= Ashish Garg =

Indan education futurist

- Occupation: education futurist

Ashish Garg is an Indian education futurist and non-executive director for Ricoh India.

== Educational activities ==
As an education futurist, Garg studies emerging global trends and the challenges and opportunities they present in the context of K-12 education. An advocate of the 'innovation ready over career ready' paradigm, she is known for her 'Discover Tomorrow Progressive Principals Workshops'. She believes that human capacity to dream and to lead lives in the future depends on the choices we make today and that the 'future is not something that happens to us, it is something we create.' Within this context, her quest for a 'preferred' future as compared to a 'possible' or 'probable' future drives her work and commitment to the future of learning.

A former member of the UN ICT Task Force, her experiences with educational technology and youth development give her a perspective on defining the future of learning. She advises and consults with country governments, education boards and progressive school leaders across India, the Middle East and Africa. She is an invited speaker to national and international forums including the World Summit on the Information Society (WSIS), the World Economic Forum (WEF), World Bank and UN meetings in Asia, Africa and Europe. She also serves on the jury of several ICT and Education Awards.

== Directorial positions ==
Ashish Garg is the chair of the advisory board of the Economic Times Education Initiative – 'Future of Learning (2014–2016)'. She sits on the board of Ricoh India Ltd, UNESCO's Open Knowledge Community and the North East Development Foundation. She headed the creation of India's National Policy on ICT in Education as a strategic advisor to the Ministry of Human Resource Development, Government of India. She also led the development of the Rajasthan Education Initiative, a multi-stakeholder education project in partnership with the Government of Rajasthan, World Economic Forum and Confederation of Indian Industry. An expert on multi-stakeholder partnerships in education, she is the author of several publications.

== Qualifications ==
Ashish is a gold medalist with Honors in English Literature and a national scholarship award. She also holds a degree in Education and Human Resource Management.
