= Generali Central Life Insurance =

Indian Life Insurance Company Pvt Ltd

- Formerly: Future Generali India Life Insurance
- Type: Public
- Industry: Life insurance
- Founded: 2007
- Headquarters: Mumbai, India
- Key people: Alok Rungta (MD & CEO)
- Products: Life insurance
- Owner: Generali Group; Central Bank of India
- Parent: Generali Group; Central Bank of India
- Website: www.generalicentrallife.com

Generali Central Life Insurance (formerly Future Generali India Life Insurance Company Limited) is an Indian publicly held life insurance company headquartered in Mumbai, India. It operates as a joint venture between the Generali Group, an Italian insurance company based in Trieste, and the Central Bank of India. The company has operations in over 1,100 locations across India.

On 27 June 2025, Central Bank of India acquired a 25.18% stake in the company from Future Enterprises.

Generali Central Life Insurance was established on 30 July 2025 as a joint venture between the Generali Group and the Central Bank of India.

== History ==
The company was originally established in 2007 as a joint venture between Future Group (74% owner) and Generali Group (26% owner). In 2013, Future Group sold 22.5% to Industrial Investment Trust Limited for ₹350 crore. In 2022, Generali purchased 16.62% for ₹225 crore (€26 million) from Industrial Investment Trust Limited. In 2023, FGILI became the first Indian insurance company to have 74% Foreign Direct Investment (FDI), with Generali becoming the major stakeholder with a 73.99% stake.

In August 2024, the company introduced Women in Insurance (WiN), a digital sales distribution channel led by women. The programme recruits women, particularly from non‑metro MBA institutions, and provides training for sales roles in the company.

The Reserve Bank of India has approved Central Bank of India's insurance sector entry via a joint venture with Future Generali India Insurance and Future Generali India Life. With a Rs 508 crore investment, the bank acquired a 24.91% stake in FGIICL and 25.18% in FILICL, they got IRDAI approvals.

Starting from April 2024, Alok Rungta has been appointed as the Managing Director and Chief Executive Officer at Future Generali India Life Insurance.

As of June 30, 2025, the Future Apex Fund was rated five-star by Morningstar, delivering up to 24.2 % CAGR over five years, and the Future Midcap Fund was rated four-star by Morningstar, delivering up to 30.80 % CAGR over the past five years.

In FY26, Generali Central Life gross written premium rose 16% to ₹2,910 crore (₹2,511 crore) and the Assets Under Management (AUM) crossed the ₹10,000 crore mark and stood at ₹10,470 crore in FY26. The company declared ₹102.54 crore bonus in the fiscal, an increase of 21% yoy, that it said will benefit over 95,000 policyholders.
