= Reliance Retail =

Indian retail company

- Type: Subsidiary
- ISIN: INE002A01018
- Industry: Retail
- Founded: 2006; 20 years ago
- Founder: Mukesh Ambani
- Headquarters: Mumbai, Maharashtra, India
- Number of locations: 18,836 (2024)
- Area served: India
- Key people: Mukesh Ambani (Chairman); Isha Ambani (Managing Director)
- Services: Supermarket; Hypermarket; Cash & carry; Warehouse; Grocery store; Superstore; Convenience shop
- Revenue: ▲₹330,870 crore (US$35 billion) (2025)
- Operating income: ▲₹24,265 crore (US$2.6 billion) (2025)
- Net income: ▲₹12,392 crore (US$1.3 billion) (2025)
- Owner: Reliance Industries (85.12%); Vanishree Commercials (4.7%); Infotel Infocomm (0.6%); Sovereign wealth funds (5.86); Private equity firms (4.32%)
- Number of employees: 207,552 (2024)
- Parent: Reliance Industries
- Subsidiaries: See divisions and subsidiaries
- Website: relianceretail.com
- Footnotes; Financials as of 31 March 2025.

Reliance Retail is an Indian retail company and a subsidiary of Reliance Industries. Founded in 2006, it is the largest retailer in India in terms of revenue. Its retail outlets offer foods, groceries, apparel, footwear, toys, home improvement products, electronic goods, and farm implements and inputs. As of 2023, it has over 245,000 employees at 18,000 store locations in 7,000 towns.

== History ==
Reliance Retail was established in 2006 as a wholly owned subsidiary of Reliance Industries, with chairman Mukesh Ambani announcing an investment of up to ₹25,000 crore (US$5.52 billion) for the new venture at Reliance's 32nd annual general meeting in June 2006.

The first set of convenience stores under the name Reliance Fresh were inaugurated in Hyderabad in November 2006. This was followed by entry into consumer electronics via Reliance Digital, hypermarkets under Reliance Mart, apparel with Reliance Trends, jewellery via Reliance Jewels, and footwear through Reliance Footprint, all in 2007.

In 2008, Marks & Spencer established a 51:49 joint venture with Reliance Retail to open a chain of Marks & Spencer stores in India. In 2011, Reliance Retail started its wholesale cash and carry chain called Reliance Market.

In 2013, the company stopped retailing non-vegetarian food items and shut down its 100-plus Reliance Delight meat and seafood stores, owing to opposition from shareholders, customers and animal rights activists. By 2014, it also closed its book and music stores called Reliance TimeOut, and furniture retailer, Reliance Living, in order to focus on value retailing and e-commerce.

In 2016, Reliance Retail rebranded its hypermarket and mini-hypermarket formats–Reliance Mart and Reliance Super–under the name Reliance Smart. In April 2016, it launched its online fashion retail platform called AJIO.

Reliance Retail largely grew organically until 2019, when it acquired the multinational toy retailer Hamleys. In December 2019, the company soft-launched its online grocery service JioMart, followed by a wide launch in May 2020 amidst the COVID-19 lockdown.

In August 2020, Reliance Retail announced its acquisition of Future Group's retail, wholesale, logistics and warehousing business for ₹24,713 crore (US$3.34 billion). However, the deal was called off in April 2022 after a prolonged legal dispute between Future Group and Amazon. Later, Reliance Retail took over more than 200 of Future Group's Big Bazaar, Central and Brand Factory outlets due to Future Group's non-payment of lease, and reopened them as Smart Bazaar, Centro and Fashion Factory respectively.

In October 2021, the company partnered with 7-Eleven to franchise the latter's stores in India, opening India's first 7-Eleven in Mumbai. In July 2022, Reliance Retail entered a similar franchising agreement with Gap to bring Gap to India.

In January 2022, Reliance Retail invested $200 million in Dunzo for a 25.8% stake.

In 2022, soft drink brand Campa Cola was acquired by Reliance Industries for ₹22 crores. In March 2023, Reliance Consumer Products (RCPL), the fast-moving consumer goods arm and subsidiary of Reliance Retail Ventures (RRVL), announced the relaunch of Campa Cola in three flavours at select stores.

In May 2024, Jio Leasing Services Ltd (JLSL), a subsidiary of Jio Financial Services, announced that it would lease customer premises equipment, devices and telecom equipment worth $4.32 billion from Reliance Retail.

In February 2025, Reliance Retail re-launched Shein in India, nearly five years after the app was banned by the Indian government due to privacy concerns. This followed a 2023 partnership between Reliance Retail and Shein to source products locally from India.

== Subsidiaries and divisions ==
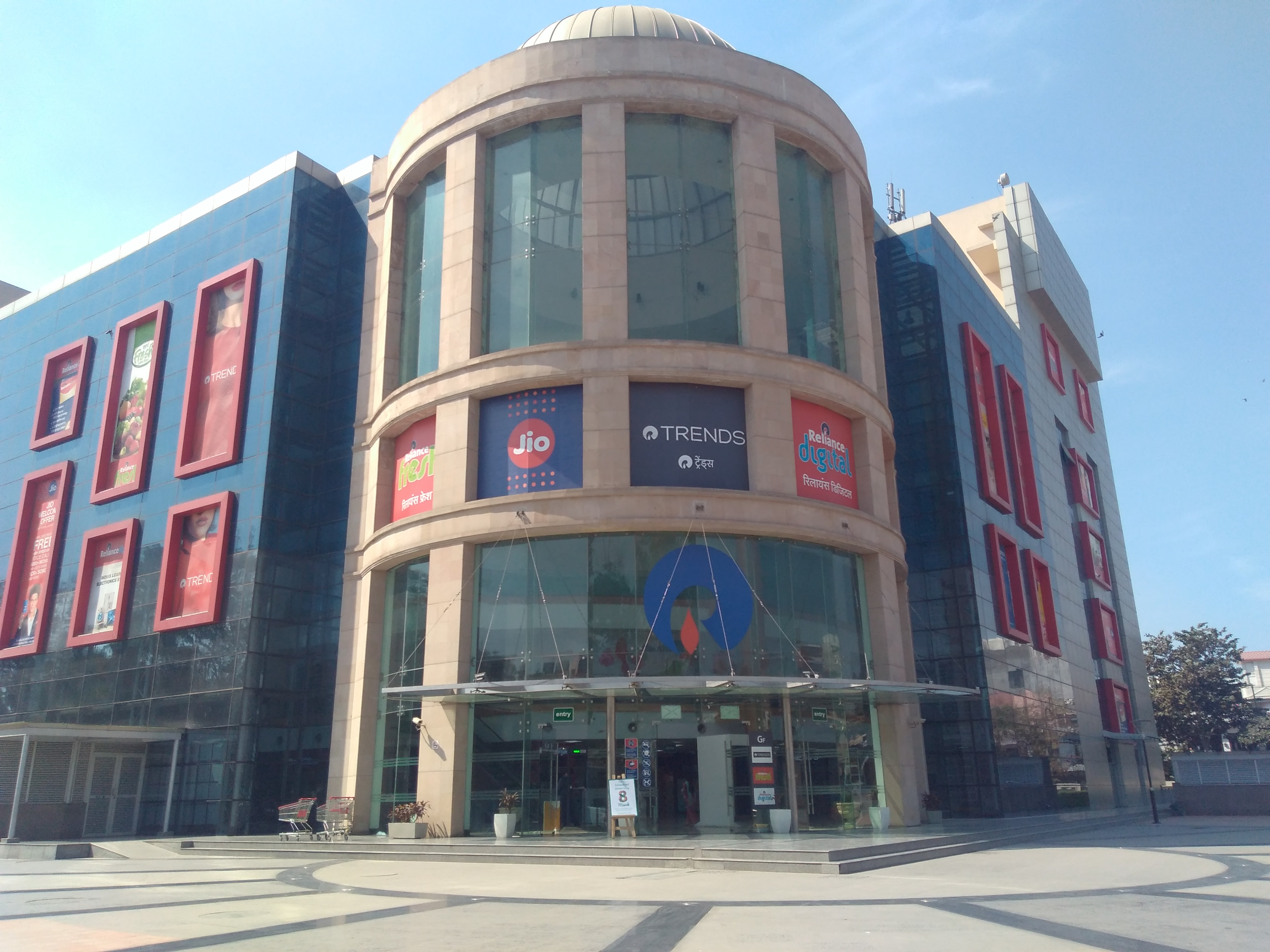
Reliance Mall, Delhi

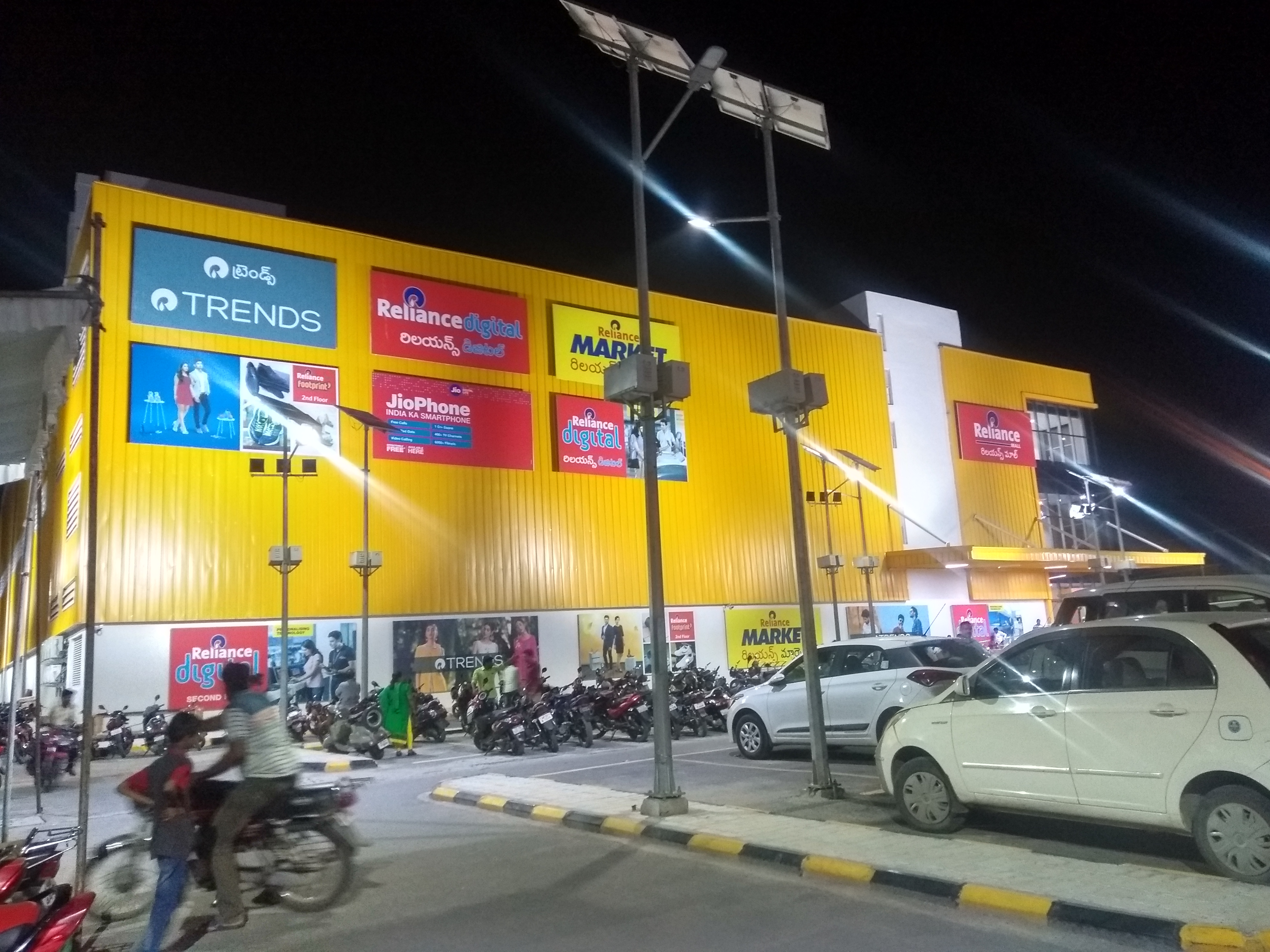
Reliance Mall, Nizamabad

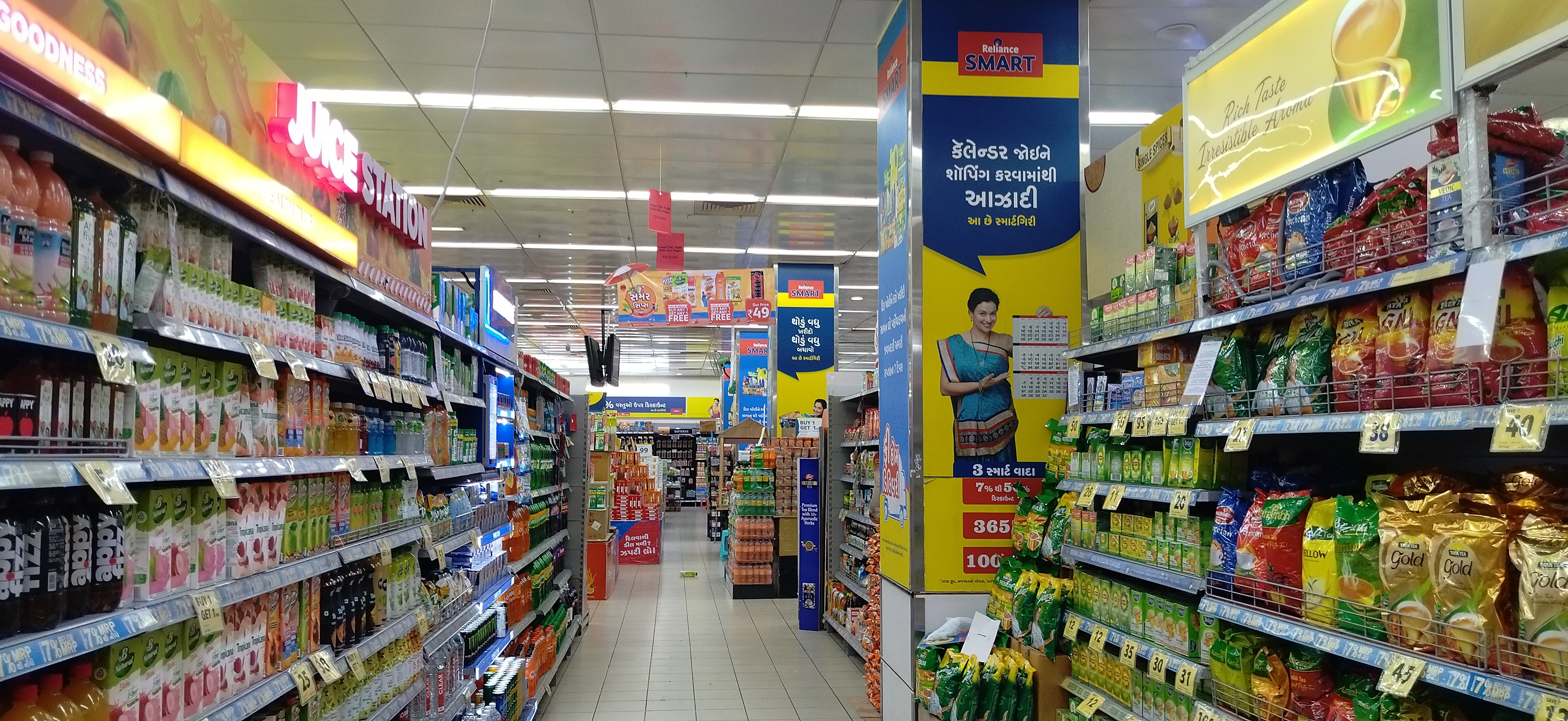
Inside a Reliance Smart supermarket in Ahmedabad

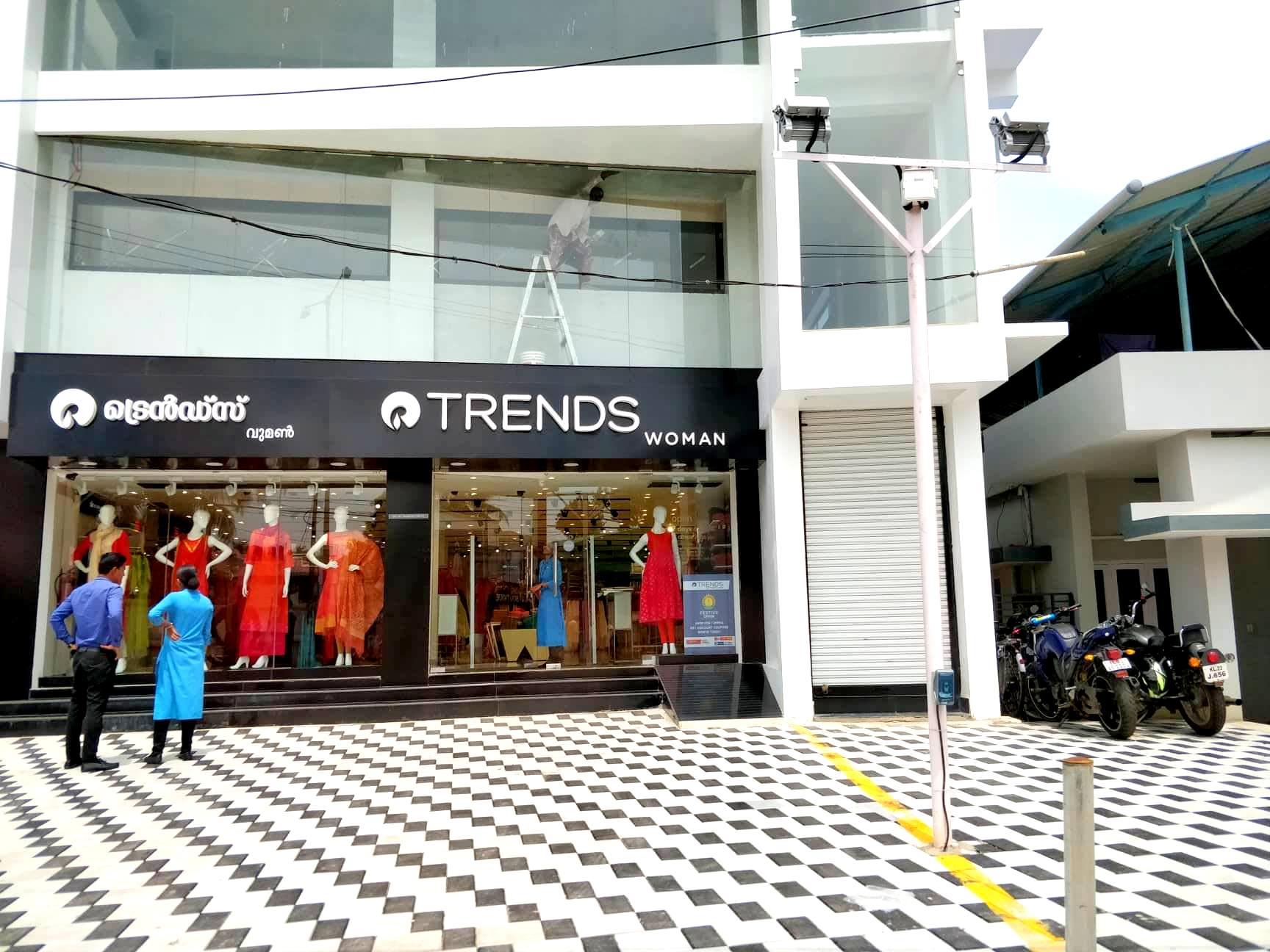
A Reliance Trends Woman store in Kollam.

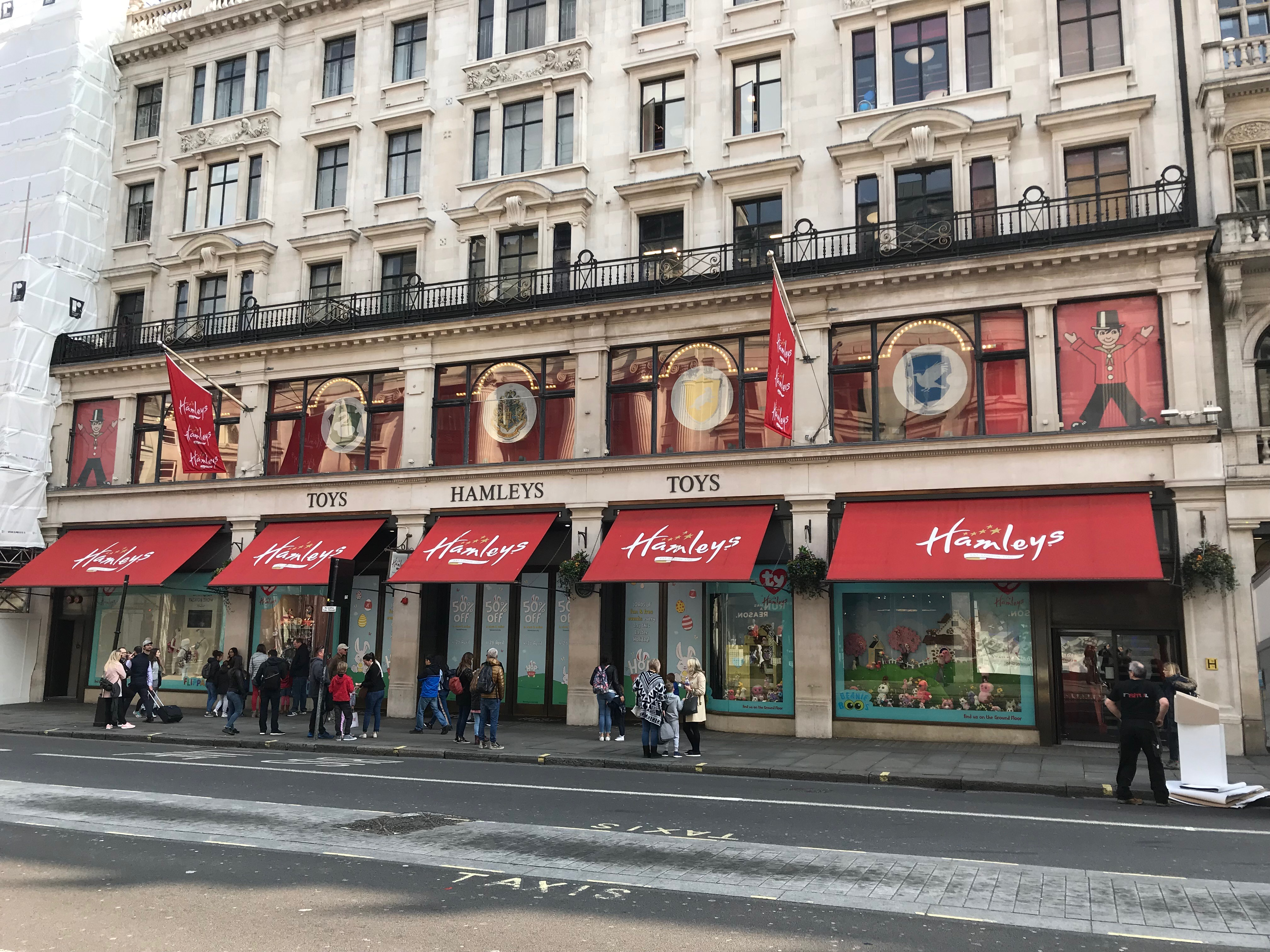
A Hamleys store in London

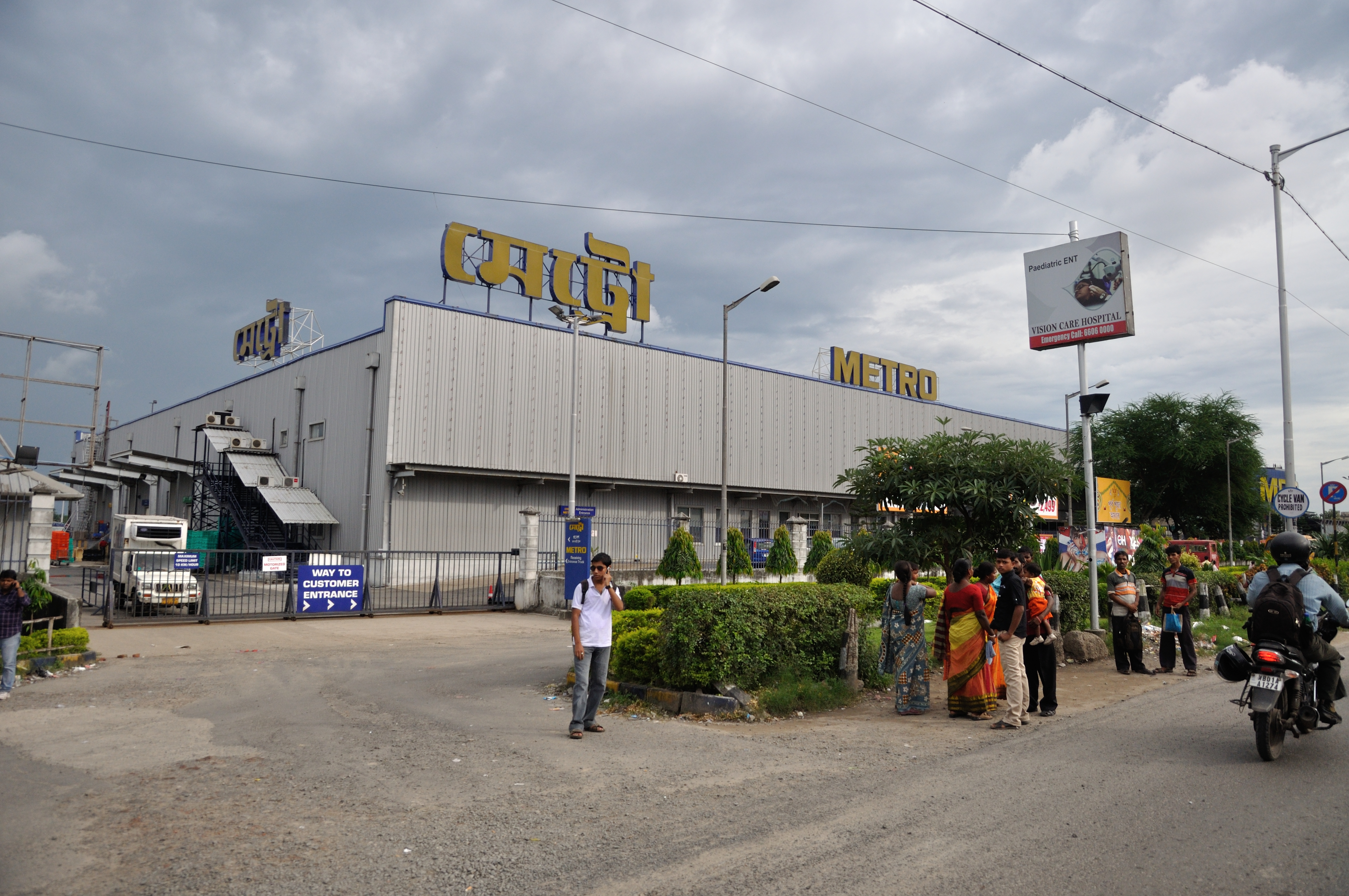
Metro Cash & Carry, Kolkata

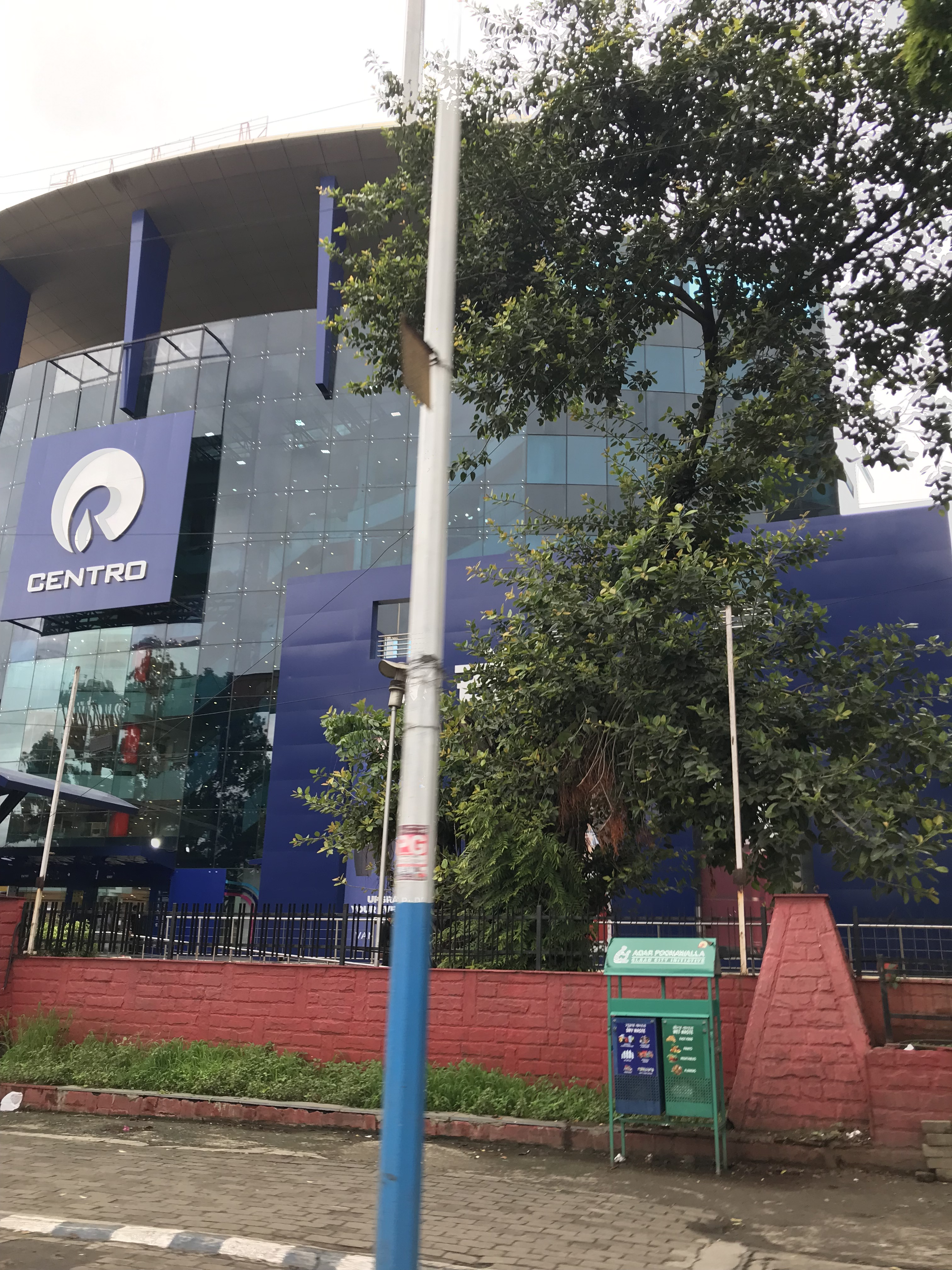
Reliance Centro, Pune

There are over 45 subsidiaries and divisions of Reliance Retail.

=== Major divisions ===
No.	Name	Note
1	Reliance Fresh	Retail outlets of fruits, vegetables and groceries.
2	Reliance Smart/Smart Point	Reliance Smart offers fresh produce, bakery, dairy products, home, and personal care products, general merchandise, fruits, vegetables, and groceries.
3	Reliance Digital	Consumer electronics retail stores. It had 689 stores in 2014.
4	Jio Stores	Small-format connectivity retailer which sells Jio connections, phones and accessories. It had over 7,900 stores as of 2022.
5	Reliance Jewels	Jewellery retail; it had 77 showrooms in 2018.
6	Trends	Apparel and clothing. It had more than 2,300 stores in 2023.
7	Reliance Trends Footwear	Footwear retail format which was known as Reliance Footprint until 2019. It had over 800 stores in 2024.
8	Reliance Market	Cash and carry wholesale format. It had 40 stores in 2022.
9	Reliance Brands	Licensee of foreign upmarket fashion brands. It had 595 stores and 744 shop-in-shops in 2021.
10	AJIO	E-commerce, fashion shopping website, officially launched at the Lakme Fashion Week SS16.
11	JioMart	JioMart is the e-commerce venture of Reliance Retail that provides grocery delivery. It operates in 200 cities in India and was started as a joint venture between Reliance Retail and Jio Platforms.
12	Azorte	In 2022, Reliance Retail launched fashion stores under Azorte brand, under which it retails footwear, fashion accessories, home and beauty products.
13	Tira	Tira is an omnichannel beauty retailer launched in April 2023.

=== Acquisitions ===
No.	Name	Note
1	Hamleys	Hamleys, one of the oldest and largest toy retailers in the world, was acquired by Reliance Retail in 2019 for £67.96 million.
2	Shri Kannan Departmental Store	Shri Kannan Departmental Store is a retail store chain that sells fruits, vegetables, dairy, staples, home, and personal care, and general merchandise. It operates 29 stores in Coimbatore and was acquired by Reliance Retail in 2020 for ₹152.5 crore.
3	Netmeds	Netmeds is a licensed e-pharmacy based in Chennai. In 2020, Reliance Retail acquired a 60% stake in Netmeds' parent Vitalic for approximately ₹620 crore.
4	Urban Ladder	Urban Ladder is an omnichannel furniture and decor retailer based out of Bangalore, India. In 2020, Reliance Retail acquired a 96% stake in Urban Ladder for ₹182 crore.
5	Addverb	Addverb is a Noida-based robotics company in which Reliance Retail bought a 55% stake for $132 million in 2021.
6	Amante	Amante is a retailer and wholesale distributor of lingerie in India and Sri Lanka, acquired by Reliance Retail in 2021.
7	Zivame	Bangalore-based Zivame is an online retailer of lingerie, activewear, sleepwear and shapewear for women. In 2021, Reliance Retail acquired an 85% stake in the company for ₹1,200 crore.
8	Justdial	In 2021, Reliance Retail acquired a 66% stake in local search company Justdial for ₹5,710 crore (US$770.58 million).
9	Milkbasket	Milkbasket is a subscription-based daily micro-delivery service. In October 2021, Reliance Retail Ventures acquired a 96.49% stake in Milkbasket.
10	Clovia	Clovia is an Indian innerwear and loungewear company. In 2022, Reliance Retail acquired a 89% stake in the company for $125 million.
11	Metro Cash & Carry India	In December 2022, Reliance Retail acquired Metro Cash & Carry India for ₹2,850 crore (US$362.57 million). After the acquisition, Reliance Retail gained control of 31 Metro India stores which had over 3 million B2B customers.
12	V-Retail	In 2023, Reliance Retail acquired V-Retail, a footwear and apparel retail company which operated 32 stores under the name of Centro across Telangana, Andhra Pradesh and Karnataka.
13	Bismi	In financial year 2023, Reliance Retail Ventures acquired Bismi, an electronics and grocery retail chain with 30 stores in Kerala.
14	Kelvinator	Reliance Retail announced the acquisition of the Kelvinator brand on July 18, 2025, marking a strategic expansion into India’s consumer durables sector.

== Products and services ==
=== Private label products ===
Although Reliance Retail's grocery businesses primarily markets products of third party FMCG players, they also sell inhouse brands including: Best Farms, Good Life, Enzo, Mopz, Expelz and Home One.

=== Fashion labels ===
Reliance Brands, a wholly owned subsidiary of Reliance Retail, holds stakes in fashion labels such as Satya Paul (72%), Manish Malhotra (40%), and Ritu Kumar (52%).

== Funding ==
In September 2020, American investment firm Silver Lake bought a 1.75% stake in Reliance Retail for ₹7,500 crore and KKR acquired a 1.28% stake for ₹5,500 crore valuing the company at $58 billion.

In October 2020, Singapore's sovereign wealth fund GIC bought a 1.22% stake for $752 million, while TPG acquired a 0.41% stake for $250 million, giving Reliance Retail a pre-money valuation of $58.5 billion.

In August 2023, the Qatar Investment Authority invested $1 billion in Reliance Retail for a 0.99% stake in the company at a $100 billion valuation. In October 2023, the Abu Dhabi Investment Authority acquired a 0.59% stake in the company with an investment of nearly $600 million.
