= Aditya Birla Fashion and Retail =

Indian clothing retail company pvt ltd

Aditya Birla Fashion and Retail Ltd.
- Type: Public
- Traded as: BSE: 535755; NSE: ABFRL
- Industry: Retail
- Founded: 2015; 11 years ago
- Headquarters: Mumbai, Maharashtra, India
- Area served: India
- Key people: Ashish Dikshit (MD)
- Products: Clothing
- Revenue: ▲₹8177 crore (US$ 0.95 billion) (2026)
- Operating income: ▲₹967 crore (US$ 113 million) (2026)
- Net income: ▼₹624 crore (US$ 73 million) (2025)
- Total assets: ▲₹14281 crore (US$ 1.6 billion) (2025)
- Total equity: ▲₹8298 crore (US$ 0.97 billion) (2025)
- Number of employees: 16,000+ (FY2026)
- Parent: Aditya Birla Group
- Website: www.abfrl.com

Aditya Birla Fashion and Retail Limited (ABFRL) is an Indian fashion retail company headquartered in Mumbai. It emerged after the consolidation of the branded apparel businesses of Aditya Birla Nuvo Limited (ABNL), comprising ABNL's Madura Fashion division and ABNL's subsidiaries Pantaloons Fashion and Retail (PFRL) and Madura Fashion & Lifestyle (MFL), in May 2015. Post consolidation, PFRL was renamed Aditya Birla Fashion and Retail Ltd.

== History ==
Madura Garments was established in 1988, acquired by the Aditya Birla Group in 1999 and was renamed Madura Fashion & Lifestyle in 2010.

A Pantaloons store in Bengaluru

The garment activities of group holding company Aditya Birla Nuvo and another group entity, Madura Garments Lifestyle Retail, would be demerged into listed firm Pantaloons Fashion & Retail Ltd (PFRL) under the scheme of arrangement. Madura owns and retails brands such as Louis Philippe, Van Heusen, Allen Solly, Peter England.

In 2012, Aditya Birla Nuvo acquired major stakes in Pantaloons. In 2015, Pantaloons was renamed Aditya Birla Fashion and Retail Ltd. (ABFRL).

ABFRL acquired the Jaypore brand and bought 51% stake in Finesse International Design that runs the designer wear label Shantanu & Nikhil in 2019.

In 2020, Flipkart acquired a 7.8% stake in ABFRL for ₹ 1,500 crore.

In 2021, ABFRL entered into an agreement to buy a 51% stake in the designer brand Sabyasachi. Later that year, ABFRL entered into a partnership with designer Tarun Tahiliani. In January 2022, ABFRL acquired 51% stake in House of Masaba Lifestyle.

In December 2021, ABFRL experienced a data breach carried out by ShinyHunters, whose ransom demand was allegedly rejected. Subsequently, customer information including 5.4 million unique email addresses, names, phone numbers, physical addresses, order histories and passwords stored as MD5 hashes was dumped publicly on a hacking forum.

In 2022, the group has partnership and launched TMRW’s portfolio, which includes Bewakoof, Wrogn, The Indian Garage Co, Nobero, Urbano, Veirdo, Juneberry.

In April 2024, ABFRL's subsidiary Madura Fashion & Lifestyle demerged into a separate public listed entity.

In May 2024, ABFRL acquired an additional stake in its subsidiary Indivinity Clothing Retail Private Limited (ICRPL) which increased ABFRL's holding from 80% to 85.54%.

In 2024, Aditya Birla Group took a decision to demerge ABFRL's erstwhile Madura business into Aditya Birla Lifestyle Brands Limited (ABLBL), This demerger was effective on 1st May 2025.

On 3 September 2026, Pantaloons opened its first store in Nagaland.

== Operations ==
As of March 31, 2026, the company has a presence across 1,273 stores spanning over 7.9 Mn sq.ft. retail space. Pantaloons brands caters to men, women and children with a mix of private labels and licensed brands in apparel and accessories.

Its international brands include The Collective. It has exclusive partnerships with brands such as Hackett London, Galeries Lafayette.

Its ethnic wear brands include Jaypore, Tasva & Marigold Lane. The company has strategic partnerships with Designers ‘Shantnu & Nikhil’, ‘Tarun Tahiliani', ‘Sabyasachi’ and 'House of Masaba'.

In September 2023, it completed the acquisition of a 51% stake in TCNS Clothing Co. Ltd, a women’s branded ethnic apparel company that includes brands W, Aurelia, Wishful, Elleven & Folksong.

== Partnerships and acquisitions ==
Year	Type	Company name	Notes	Valuation/Stake	Ref.
2012	Joint venture	Hackett	Hackett Limited is a British clothing brand for men and boys	50% stake	
2016	Partnership	Ted Baker	Ted Baker is a British high-street clothing retail company	N/A	
2018	Partnership	Ralph Lauren	Ralph Lauren Corporation is an American publicly traded fashion company	N/A	
2019	Acquisition	Jaypore	Jaypore is an Indian fashion women ethnic wear brand	₹110 crore	
2019	Acquisition	TG Apparel & Decor	TG Apparel & Decor is an Indian clothing brand	N/A	
2019	Acquisition	Shantanu & Nikhil	Shantanu & Nikhil is an Indian fashion designer	51% stake	
2020	Partnership	Fred Perry	Fred Perry is a British clothing label	N/A	
2021	Partnership	Sabyasachi	Sabyasachi is an Indian fashion and jewellery label	51% stake (₹398 crore)	
2021	Partnership	Tarun Tahiliani	Tarun Tahiliani is an Indian fashion and jewellery designer	33.5% stake (₹67 crore)	
2022	Partnership	Masaba Gupta	Masaba Gupta is an Indian fashion designer	51% stake	
2023	Acquisition	TCNS Clothing Limited	TCNS Clothing is an Indian public limited company and women's branded apparel retailer	51% stake	
2023	Partnership	Christian Louboutin	Christian Louboutin is a French fashion designer	N/A	
2024	Merger	TCNS Clothing Limited	TCNS Brands (W, Aurelia, Wishful, Elleven, Folksong) amalgamated into ABFRL	N/A	
2024	Partnership	Tarun Tahiliani	Stake increased from 33.5%	51% stake	
2025	Demerger	ABLBL	Aditya Birla Group demerged ABFRL's Madura business into Aditya Birla Lifestyle Brands Limited (ABLBL), effective 1 May 2025	N/A	

== See also ==
- Trendin
