= List of companies of India =

Location of India

India is a country in South Asia. It is the seventh-largest country by area, the most populous country (with over 1.4 billion people), (Note: According to UN estimates, India surpassed China by the end of April 2023.) and the most populous democracy in the world.

The Indian economy is the world's fifth largest by nominal GDP and third largest by purchasing power parity. Following market-based economic reforms in 1991, India became one of the fastest-growing major economies and is considered a newly industrialised country.

For further information on the types of business entities in this country and their abbreviations, see: "Business entities in India".

== Largest firms ==
This list shows firms in the Fortune Global 500, which ranks firms by total revenues reported before 31 January 2025. Only the top 5 ranking firms (if available) are included as a sample.

Rank	Image	Name	2024 revenues (US$M)	Employees	Notes
86		Reliance Industries	108,878	347,000	Reliance Industries is a true conglomerate with interests in energy, petrochemicals, textiles, natural resources, retail, and telecommunications.
95		Life Insurance Corporation	103,547	98,463	India's largest multinational public sector life insurance company.
116		Indian Oil Corporation	94,273	31,942	Indian Oil provides products and services all along the energy value chain, and is India's largest commercial entity. The firm has been on the Global 500 as long as the list has been recorded.
178		State Bank of India	71,844	232,296	The bank is a state-owned, multi-national financial services entity, founded in 1806 as the Bank of Calcutta. The firm operates in more than 36 countries.
180		Oil and Natural Gas Corporation	71,466	36,549	State-owned largest crude oil and gas company in India.

== Notable firms ==
This list includes notable companies with primary headquarters located in the country. The industry and sector follow the Industry Classification Benchmark taxonomy. Organizations which have ceased operations are included and noted as defunct.

Notable companies Status: P=Private, S=State; A=Active, D=Defunct
Name	Industry	Sector	Headquarters	Founded	Notes	Status	
63 Moons Technologies	Technology	Software	Mumbai	1988	Financial technology	P	A
Aban Offshore	Energy	Oil & gas offshore drilling & other services	Chennai	1986	Oil, petrochemical	P	A
ABG Shipyard	Industrials	Shipbuilding	Ahmedabad	1985	Ship building	P	A
ABP Group	Consumer services	Broadcasting & entertainment	Kolkata	1922	Media, news	P	A
ACC	Industrials	Cement	Mumbai	1936	Cement	P	A
ACG Group	Industrials	Machinery: specialty	Mumbai	1961	Pharmaceutical industry machinery & medicinal materials manufacturer	P	A
Acko General Insurance	Insurance	Full line insurance	Mumbai	2016	Insurance	P	A
Action Construction Equipment	Industrials	Machinery: construction & handling	Faridabad	1995	Bulldozers, cranes	P	A
Action Group	Conglomerate	—	New Delhi	1972	Apparel, chemicals, retail, steel	P	A
Adani Group	Conglomerate	—	Ahmedabad	1988	Conglomerate	P	A
Adani Power	Utilities	Alternative electricity	Mumbai	1910	Thermal & solar power generation, part of Adani Group	P	A
Aditya Birla Fashion and Retail	Retail	Specialty retailers	Mumbai	1997	Clothing retailer	P	A
Aditya Birla Group	Conglomerate	—	Mumbai	1857	Agribusiness, cement, chemicals	P	A
Ador Group	Conglomerate	—	Mumbai	1977	Electronics, energy, chemicals	P	A
Advanced Weapons and Equipment India	Industrials	Defense	Kanpur	2021	Weapons	S	A
Apar Industries	Industrials	Electrical transmission equipment	Mumbai	1958	electrical conductors, cables, transformer oils	P	A
Afcons Infrastructure	Industrials	Construction	Mumbai	1959	Construction	P	A
Agriculture Insurance Company of India	Insurance	Full line insurance	New Delhi	2002	Insurance	S	A
Air Costa	Consumer services	Airlines	Vijayawada	2013	Defunct 2017	P	D
Air India	Consumer services	Airlines	New Delhi	1932	Airline, part of Tata Sons	P	A
Air India Express	Consumer services	Airlines	Kochi	2005	Low-cost airline, part of Air India	P	A
Ajanta Group	Conglomerate	—	Ahmedabad	1971	Textile, transport, construction machinery	P	A
Alkem Laboratories	Health care	Pharmaceuticals	Mumbai	1973	Pharma	P	A
Allcargo Logistics	Industrials	Industrial transportation	Mumbai	1993	Logistics & transportation	P	A
Amartex	Basic materials	Textile products	Gurugram	1984	Textiles	P	A
Ambuja Cements	Industrials	Cement	Mumbai	1983	Cement	P	A
Amrutanjan Healthcare	Health care	Ayurvedic producers	Chennai	1893	Alternative medicines	P	A
Amul	Consumer goods	Food products	Anand	1946	Dairy	P	A
Angel One	Financials	Investment services	Mumbai	1996	Stock broker	P	A
Apollo Hospitals	Health care	Health care providers	Chennai	1983	Hospital chain	P	A
Apollo Tyres	Consumer goods	Tires	Gurugram	1972	Tyres, parts	P	A
Aptech	Industrials	Business training & employment agencies	Mumbai	1986	Training	P	A
Archies	Retail	Specialty retailers	New Delhi	1979	Greeting cards	P	A
Arise India	Consumer goods	Consumer electronics	Delhi	1995	Electrical goods, home appliances	P	A
Armoured Vehicles Nigam	Industrials	Defense	Chennai	2021	Armoured military vehicles	S	A
Artemis Hospital	Health care	Health care providers	Gurugram	2007	Hospitals	P	A
Arvind	Conglomerate	—	Ahmedabad	1931	Clothing, engineering, real estate	P	A
Ashok Leyland	Industrials	Commercial vehicles & parts	Chennai	1948	Buses, trucks, defense vehicles, joint venture of Hinduja Group & Nissan (Japan)	P	A
Asia MotorWorks	Industrials	Commercial vehicles & parts	Mumbai	2002	Trucks	P	A
Asian Paints	Industrials	Paints and coatings	Mumbai	1942	Paints	P	A
Atul	Chemicals	Chemicals: diversified	Ahmedabad	1947	Integrated chemicals	P	A
Atul Auto	Consumer goods	Automobiles	Rajkot	1970	Auto-rickshaws	P	A
Avantha Group	Conglomerate	—	New Delhi	1919	Chemicals, I/T, BPO	P	A
Axis Bank	Financials	Banks	Ahmedabad	1993		P	A
Bajaj Auto	Consumer goods	Automobiles	Pune	1945	Motorcycles, part of Bajaj Group	P	A
Bajaj Group	Conglomerate	—	Pune	1945	Motorcycles, financial services, electricals, sugar, iron & steel, insurance, consumer goods	P	A
Balaji Telefilms	Consumer services	Broadcasting & entertainment	Mumbai	1994	Film production	P	A
Balaji Wafers	Consumer goods	Food products	Mumbai	1975	Potato chips	P	A
Ballarpur Industries	Basic materials	Paper	Gurugram	1945	Paper	P	A
Bank of Baroda	Financials	Banks	Vadodara	1908	State-owned bank	S	A
Bank of India	Financials	Banks	Mumbai	1906	Government-owned bank	S	A
Bellatrix Aerospace	Industrials	Aerospace, space industry	Bengaluru	2015	Launch vehicles & satellites	P	A
BEML	Industrials	Commercial vehicles & parts	Bengaluru	1964	Defense vehicles, heavy construction vehicles, rail vehicles	S	A
Bharat Aluminium Company	Basic materials	Aluminium	New Delhi	1965	Aluminium, part of Vedanta Resources (UK)	P	A
Bharat Biotech	Health care	Pharmaceuticals & biotechnology	Hyderabad	1996	Drug development & vaccines	P	A
Bharat Dynamics Limited	Industrials	Aerospace & defense	Hyderabad	1970	State-owned missiles, defense	S	A
Bharat Electronics	Industrials	Aerospace & defense	Bengaluru	1954	State-owned electronics, defense	S	A
Bharat Forge	Industrials	Industrial engineering	Pune	1961	Engineering and machinery, part of Kalyani Group	P	A
Bharat Heavy Electricals Limited	Industrials	Electrical equipment & components	New Delhi	1964	State electrical engineering	S	A
Bharat Petroleum	Energy	Oil refining & marketing	Mumbai	1976	Refineries, petrochemical	S	A
Bharat Sanchar Nigam Limited	Telecommunications	Telecommunications service providers	New Delhi	2000	Fixed-line telecommunications	S	A
BHAVINI	Utilities	Conventional electricity	Chennai	2003	State nuclear power generation	S	A
Bharti Airtel	Telecommunications	Telecommunications services	New Delhi	1995	Mobile network	P	A
Biocon	Health care	Pharmaceuticals & biotechnology	Bengaluru	1978	Pharmaceutical ingredients	P	A
Blue Star	Consumer goods	Consumer electronics	Mumbai	1943	Home appliances	P	A
BluSmart	Technology	Consumer digital services	Gurugram	2019	Taxi services, ride-sharing	P	A
Bombay Dyeing	Basic materials	Textile products	Mumbai	1879	Textiles	P	A
Bonn Group of Industries	Consumer goods	Food products	Ludhiana	1985	Baked goods	P	A
Borosil	Industrials	Glass	Mumbai	1962	Glassware	P	A
BPL Group	Consumer goods	Consumer electronics	Palakkad	1963	Consumer electronics, healthcare equipment	P	A
BrahMos Aerospace	Industrials	Aerospace & defense	New Delhi	1998	State-owned missile systems, joint venture with Tactical Missiles Corporation (Russia)	S	A
Brigade Group	Real estate	Real estate holding & development	Bengaluru	1986	Real estate	P	A
Britannia Industries	Consumer goods	Food products	Kolkata	1892	Food products	P	A
Café Coffee Day	Consumer services	Restaurants & bars	Bengaluru	1996	Cafe chain	P	A
Canara Bank	Financials	Banks	Bengaluru	1906	State-owned bank	S	A
CaratLane	Retail	Specialty retailers	Chennai	2008	Luxury items retail, owned by Titan Company	P	A
CEAT	Consumer goods	Tires	Mumbai	1958	Tyres	P	A
Celkon	Consumer goods	Consumer electronics	Hyderabad	2009	electronics	P	A
Central Bank of India	Financials	Banks	Mumbai	1911	Central bank	S	A
Centum Electronics	Industrials	Electronic equipment & components	Bengaluru	1993	Electronics	P	A
Century Plyboards	Industrials	Building materials: other	Kolkata	1986	Plywood	P	A
CESC Limited	Utilities	Conventional electricity	Kolkata	1897	Thermal power generation	P	A
CG Power and Industrial Solutions	Industrials	Diversified industrials	Mumbai	1878	Electrical engineering, power generation	P	A
Chennai Petroleum Corporation	Energy	Oil refining & marketing	Chennai	1965	Refineries, part of Indian Oil Corporation	S	A
Cipla	Health care	Pharmaceuticals	Mumbai	1935	Pharma	P	A
City Union Bank	Financials	Banks	Kumbakonam	1904	Bank	P	A
CMC	Industrials	Business support services	New Delhi	1975	Information technology consulting	P	A
Coal India	Energy	Coal	Kolkata	1975	Coal mining	S	A
Cochin Minerals and Rutile Limited	Chemicals	Specialty chemicals	Kochi	1989	Minerals	P	A
Cochin Shipyard	Industrials	Shipbuilding	Kochi	1972	Ship building	S	A
Computer Age Management Services	Financials	Investment services	Chennai	1988	Stock market, mutual funds	P	A
Container Corporation of India	Industrials	Railroads	New Delhi	1988	Cargo rail transportation, part of Indian Railways	S	A
Coromandel International	Chemicals	Fertilizers	Hyderabad	1960	Fertilizers, pesticides	P	A
Cosmic Circuits	Technology	Semiconductors	Bengaluru	2005	Acquired by Cadence Design Systems (USA)	P	D
Crossword Bookstores	Retail	Specialty retailers	Mumbai	1992	Bookstore	P	A
CSB Bank	Financials	Banks	Thrissur	1920	Private bank	P	A
Cyient	Technology	Software & IT services	Hyderabad	1991	Engineering outsourcing services, software management & technology consulting	P	A
Dabur	Health care	Ayurvedic producers	Ghaziabad	1884	Alternative medicines	P	A
Damodar Valley Corporation	Utilities	Conventional electricity	Kolkata	1948	Hydropower	S	A
Deccan Charters	Consumer services	Airlines	Bengaluru	1997	Charter airline	P	A
Dedicated Freight Corridor Corporation of India	Industrials	Railroads	New Delhi	2006	Freight transport, part of Ministry of Railways (India)	S	A
Dempo	Basic materials	General mining	Panaji	1941	Mining	P	A
Dena Bank	Financials	Banks	Mumbai	1938	State bank	S	A
Dish TV	Consumer services	Broadcasting & entertainment	Noida	2003	Satellite television	P	A
Dixon Technologies	Industrials	Electronic equipment & components	Noida	1993	Electronics manufacturing services	P	A
DLF	Real estate	Real estate holding & development	New Delhi	1946	Developer	P	A
DMart	Retail	Diversified retailers	Mumbai	2002	Supermarkets	P	A
Dr. Reddy's Laboratories	Health care	Pharmaceuticals	Hyderabad	1984	Pharma	P	A
Dynamatic Technologies	Industrials	Industrial engineering	Bengaluru	1973	Aerospace, automotive, hydraulics, security	P	A
EaseMyTrip	Consumer services	Travel & tourism	New Delhi	2008	Travel booking	P	A
Edelweiss Group	Financials	Financial services	Mumbai	1995	Finance & investment	P	A
Eicher Motors	Industrials	Commercial vehicles & parts	Gurugram	1948	Buses, trucks	P	A
EID Parry	Consumer goods	Food products	Chennai	1788	Sugar, distillery	P	A
Ekam Eco Solutions	Industrials	Construction	New Delhi	2013	Sanitation equipment	P	A
Electronics Corporation of India Limited	Industrials	Electronic equipment & components	Hyderabad	1967	Nuclear electronics	S	A
eLitmus	Industrials	Business training & employment agencies	Bengaluru	2005	Assessment exam	P	A
Emami	Conglomerate	—	Kolkata	1974	Fast-moving consumer goods, healthcare, retail, cement, real estate	P	A
Emcure Pharmaceuticals	Health care	Pharmaceuticals	Pune	1983	Pharma	P	A
Engineers India	Industrials	Engineering and contracting services	New Delhi	1965	Engineering and consulting	S	A
English Indian Clays	Basic materials	General mining	New Delhi	1963	Clay	P	A
Escorts Kubota Limited	Industrials	Industrial engineering	Faridabad	1960	Heavy equipment, machines	P	A
Essar Group	Conglomerate	—	Mumbai	1969	Steel, oil & gas, shipping, real estate	P	A
Essel Group	Conglomerate	—	Mumbai	1926	Media, technology, basic materials	P	A
Eureka Forbes	Consumer goods	Consumer electronics	Mumbai	1982	Home appliances	P	A
Eveready Industries India	Consumer goods	Durable household products	Kolkata	1905	Batteries, flashlights, lamps	P	A
Exide Industries	Industrials	Electrical equipment & components	Kolkata	1947	Batteries	P	A
Exide Life Insurance	Financials	Life insurance	Bengaluru	2001	Life insurance, part of Exide Industries	P	A
Federal Bank	Financials	Banks	Kochi	1931	Private bank	P	A
Fertilisers and Chemicals Travancore	Chemicals	Fertilizers	Kochi	1943	Fertilizers, Chemicals	P	A
Firstsource	Industrials	Business support services	Mumbai	2001	BPO	P	A
Flipkart	Technology	Consumer digital services	Bengaluru	2007	E-commerce	P	A
Forbes & Company Limited	Conglomerate	—	Mumbai	1767	Banking kiosk, ATM, robotics, industrial automation, logistics, part of Shapoorji Pallonji Group	P	A
Force Motors	Consumer goods	Automobiles	Pune	1958	Automotive	P	A
Fortis Healthcare	Health care	Health care providers	Gurugram	2001	Hospitals	P	A
Future Group	Retail	Diversified retailers	Mumbai	1987	Defunct 2022, acquired by Reliance Industries	P	D
GAIL	Utilities	Gas distribution	New Delhi	1984	Natural gas	S	A
Galaxy Surfactants	Chemicals	Specialty chemicals	Navi Mumbai	1980	Chemicals	P	A
Garden Reach Shipbuilders & Engineers	Industrials	Shipbuilding	Kolkata	1884	Ship building	S	A
Geojit Financial Services	Financials	Investment services	Kochi	1987	Investment advisory services	P	A
Gini & Jony	Consumer goods	Clothing & accessories	Mumbai	1980	Children's clothes	P	A
Glenmark Pharmaceuticals	Health care	Pharmaceuticals	Mumbai	1977	Pharma	P	A
Gliders India	Industrials	Defense	Nagpur	2021	Military parachute manufacturer	S	A
GMR Group	Real estate	Real estate holding & development	New Delhi	1978	Development projects	P	A
Go First	Consumer services	Airlines	Mumbai	2005	Low-cost airline	P	A
Goa Shipyard	Industrials	Shipbuilding	Goa	1957	Ship building	S	A
Godrej Group	Conglomerate	—	Mumbai	1897	Aerospace, consumer goods, real estate	P	A
Great Eastern Shipping	Industrials	Marine transportation	Mumbai	1948	Shipping	P	A
Greaves Cotton	Industrials	Industrial engineering	Mumbai	1859	Engines, gensets, construction equipment, farm equipment & pumps	P	A
Greenply	Industrials	Building materials: other	Tinsukia	1990	Plywood	P	A
Gujarat Alkalies and Chemicals Limited	Chemicals	Specialty chemicals	Noida	1973	Produce chemicals	S	A
Gujarat Mineral Development Corporation	Basic materials	General mining	Ahmedabad	1963	Mining, metals	S	A
Gujarat State Fertilizers and Chemicals	Chemicals	Fertilizers	Vadodara	1962	Fertilizers	S	A
Gujarat State Petroleum Corporation	Energy	Oil refining & marketing	Ahmedabad	1979	Petrochemicals refining	S	A
GVK Industries	Conglomerate	—	Hyderabad	2005	Energy, transportation, hospitality	P	A
Haldiram's	Consumer goods	Food products	Bikaner	1937	Sweets and snacks	P	A
Haptik	Technology	Software	Mumbai	2013	AI software, part of Jio Platforms	P	A
Hatsun Agro Product	Consumer goods	Food products	Chennai	1970	Arun Ice creams, Arokya Milk, Hatsun Daily, Ibaco, Oyalo, Santosa	P	A
Havells	Industrials	Electrical equipment & components	Noida	1958	Electrical equipment	P	A
Hawkins Cookers	Consumer goods	Durable household products	Mumbai	1921	Cookware	P	A
HCLTech	Industrials	Business support services	Noida	1976	Consulting	P	A
HDFC Bank	Financials	Banks	Mumbai	1994	Bank	P	A
Hero Cycles	Consumer goods	Recreational products	Ludhiana	1956	Bicycles, part of Hero Motors	P	A
Hero FinCorp	Financials	Financial services	New Delhi	1991	Financing, part of Hero MotoCorp	P	A
Hero MotoCorp	Consumer goods	Automobiles	Gurugram	1984	Motorcycles, part of Hero Motors	P	A
HFCL	Telecommunications	Telecommunications equipment	New Delhi	1987	Optical fiber, telecom equipment	P	A
Himalaya Wellness Company	Health care	Ayurvedic producers	Bengaluru	1930	Alternative medicines	P	A
Hindalco Industries	Basic materials	Aluminium	Mumbai	1958	Aluminium	P	A
Hinduja Group	Conglomerate	—	Mumbai	1914	Automotive, financial services, energy, media, telecom, healthcare	P	A
Hinduja Healthcare	Health care	Health care providers	Mumbai	?	Hospitals, part of Hinduja Group	P	A
Hindustan Aeronautics Limited	Industrials	Aerospace & defense	Bengaluru	1940	State-owned aircraft, defense	S	A
Hindustan Construction Company	Real estate	Real estate holding & development	Mumbai	1926	Real estate development	P	A
Hindustan Motors	Consumer goods	Automobiles	Kolkata	1942	Automotive, part of CK Birla Group	P	A
Hindustan Petroleum	Energy	Oil refining & marketing	Mumbai	1974	Refineries, part of Oil and Natural Gas Corporation	S	A
Hindustan Shipyard	Industrials	Shipbuilding	Visakhapatnam	1941	Ship building	S	A
Hindustan Times	Consumer services	Publishing	New Delhi	1924	Daily newspaper	P	A
Hindustan Zinc	Basic materials	Nonferrous metals	Udaipur	1966	Zinc mining, part of Vedanta Resources (UK)	P	A
HLL Lifecare	Health care	Pharmaceuticals, medical equipment	Thiruvananthapuram	1966	State-owned condoms, contraceptives & surgical equipment manufacturing	S	A
HMT Limited	Industrials	Diversified industrials	Bengaluru	1953	State-owned manufacturing	S	A
Housing Development Finance Corporation	Financials	Financial services	Mumbai	1977	Housing finance	P	A
iball	Retail	Electronic retailers	Mumbai	2001	Computers, consumer items	P	A
ICICI Bank	Financials	Banks	Mumbai	1994	International bank	P	A
IDBI Bank	Financials	Banks	Mumbai	1964	State bank	S	A
Idea Cellular	Telecommunications	Telecommunications services	Mumbai	1995	Mobile network, joint venture of Aditya Birla Group & Axiata (Malaysia), defunct 2018	P	D
IDFC First Bank	Financials	Banks	Mumbai	2015	Part of IDFC	P	A
Indegene	Health care	Health care services	Bengaluru	1998	Pharmaceutical consultancy	P	A
India Cements	Industrials	Cement	Tirunelveli	1946	Cement	P	A
India Optel	Industrials	Electronic equipment & components	Dehradun	2021	Opto-electronics, defense products	S	A
Indiabulls	Financials	Financial services	Gurugram	2000	Finance	P	A
India Infoline	Financials	Financial services	Mumbai	1995	Financial services	P	A
Indian Bank	Financials	Banks	Chennai	1907	State-owned financial services	S	A
Indian Hotels Company Limited	Consumer services	Hotels & motels	Mumbai	1902	Hospitality group, Taj Hotels, Vivanta, Ginger Hotels, part of Tata Sons	P	A
Indian Oil Corporation	Energy	Oil refining & marketing	New Delhi	1959	Petrochemicals refining	S	A
Indian Overseas Bank	Financials	Banks	Chennai	1937	Public bank	S	A
Indian Railway Finance Corporation	Financials	Financial services	New Delhi	1976	Railway finance, part of Indian Railways	S	A
Indian Railways	Industrials	Railroads	New Delhi	1853	State railway	S	A
Indian Railway Stations Development Corporation	Industrials	Railroads	New Delhi	2012	Railway station redevelopment	P	D
Indian Telephone Industries Limited	Telecommunications	Telecommunications equipment	Bengaluru	1949	State telecom equipment	S	A
IndiGo	Consumer services	Airlines	Gurugram	2006	Low-cost airline	P	A
IndusInd Bank	Financials	Banks	Mumbai	1994	Bank	P	A
Infosys	Industrials	Business support services	Bengaluru	1981	Consulting	P	A
Infrastructure Development Finance Company	Financials	Asset managers	Chennai	1997	Finance, advice	S	A
Infrastructure Leasing & Financial Services	Financials	Financial services	Mumbai	1987	Infrastructure development	S	A
InMobi	Technology	Consumer digital services	Bengaluru	2007	Online marketing	P	A
Inox Air Products	Basic materials	Specialty chemicals	Mumbai	1963	Industrial gases manufacturer & trader	P	A
Integral Coach Factory	Industrials	Railroad equipment	Chennai	1955	Part of Indian Railways	S	A
Intelenet Global Services	Industrials	Business support services	Mumbai	2000	Consulting, BPO	P	A
Intex Technologies	Consumer goods	Consumer electronics	New Delhi	1996	Consumer electronics, mobile handsets	P	A
Ircon International	Industrials	Construction	New Delhi	1976	Railway construction, part of Indian Railways	S	A
ITC Limited	Conglomerate	—	Kolkata	1910	Consumer goods, hotels, industrials	P	A
Ittiam Systems	Technology	Software & IT services	Bengaluru	2001	Digital signal processing services	P	A
Jabong.com	Technology	Consumer digital services	Gurugram	2012	E-commerce portal, defunct 2020	P	D
Jain Irrigation Systems	Industrials	Agricultural & farm machinery	Jalgaon	1986	Irrigation equipment	P	A
Jakson Group	Industrials	Industrial engineering	Noida	1947	Diesel generators, solar PV modules	P	A
Jawa Motorcycles	Consumer goods	Automobiles	Mysuru	1960	Motorcycles, joint venture of Mahindra & Mahindra & Jawa Moto (Czechia)	P	A
ISRO	Industrials	Aerospace, space industry	Bengaluru	1962	State-owned aerospace research, launch vehicles & satellites	S	A
Jaypee Group	Conglomerate	—	Noida	1979	Engineering, real estate, cement	P	A
Jet Airways	Consumer services	Airlines	Mumbai	1992	Revived in 2022	P	A
Jio-bp	Energy	Integrated oil & gas	Ahmedabad	2008	Oil & gas exploration and production, joint venture of Reliance Industries & BP (UK)	P	A
Jio	Telecommunications	Telecommunications services	Navi Mumbai	2007	Mobile network, part of Jio Platforms	P	A
Jio Platforms	Technology	Technology & telecommunications	Navi Mumbai	2019	Telecommunications, e-commerce, media, streaming, online services, virtual reality, part of Reliance Industries	P	A
Jindal Stainless	Basic materials	Iron & steel	New Delhi	1970	Steel	P	A
Jindal Steel and Power	Basic materials	Iron & steel	New Delhi	1952	Steel	P	A
Jupiter Wagons	Railways	Railroad equipment	Kolkata	1979	Railways	P	A
JSW Energy	Utilities	Conventional electricity	Mumbai	1994	Hydropower & thermal power, part of JSW Group	P	A
JSW Group	Conglomerate	—	Mumbai	1982	Automotive, steel, energy, infrastructure, cement, paint, financials	P	A
JSW MG Motor India	Consumer goods	Automobiles	Gurugram	2017	Automotive, joint venture of JSW Group & SAIC Motor (China)	P	A
JSW Steel	Basic materials	Iron & steel	Mumbai	1982	Steel, part of JSW Group	P	A
Jubilant FoodWorks	Consumer services	Restaurants & bars	Noida	1995	Food services	P	A
K Raheja Corp	Real estate	Real estate holding & development	Mumbai	1956	IT Parks, parent company of Raheja Mindspace	P	A
Kalyani Group	Conglomerate	—	Pune	?	Engineering, steel, automotive, defense, energy, infrastructure	P	A
Karbonn Mobiles	Consumer goods	Consumer electronics	New Delhi	2009	Mobile handsets	P	A
Karnataka Bank	Financials	Banks	Mangaluru	1924	Bank	P	A
Karur Vysya Bank	Financials	Banks	Karur	1916	Bank	P	A
Kerala Automobiles Limited	Consumer goods	Automobiles	Thiruvananthapuram	1978	Auto-rickshaws	P	A
Kerala Electrical and Allied Engineering Company	Industrials	Electrical equipment & components	Kochi	1964	Heavy electricals	S	A
Khadim's	Consumer goods	Footwear	Kolkata	1981	Footwear	P	A
Kingfisher	Consumer goods	Brewery	Bengaluru	1857	Alcoholic beverages, brewery, part of United Breweries Group (Netherlands)	P	A
Kirloskar Group	Conglomerate	—	Pune	1888	Industrials, construction, automotive	P	A
Kokuyo Camlin	Consumer goods	Nondurable household products	Mumbai	1931	Pens, stationery	P	A
Konkan Railway Corporation	Industrials	Railroads	Navi Mumbai	1990	Railway, part of Indian Railways	S	A
Kotak Mahindra Bank	Financials	Banks	Mumbai	1965	Bank	P	A
KPIT Technologies	Consumer goods	Automobiles & parts	Pune	1990	Automotive engineering & technologies	P	A
Kudremukh Iron Ore Company	Basic materials	Iron & steel	Mangaluru	1976	Mining, iron	S	A
Lakshmi Machine Works	Industrials	Diversified industrials	Coimbatore	1962	Machinery	P	A
Lakshmi Vilas Bank	Financials	Banks	Chennai	1926	Bank	P	A
Lanco Infratech	Conglomerate	—	New Delhi	1986	Power, real estate, distribution	P	A
Larsen & Toubro	Conglomerate	—	Mumbai	1938	Industrials, ships, equipment, defense	P	A
Lava International	Consumer goods	Consumer electronics	Noida	2009	Computers, mobile handsets	P	A
Liberty Shoes	Consumer goods	Footwear	Karnal	1954	Footwear	P	A
Life Insurance Corporation	Financials	Life insurance	Mumbai	1956	State-owned Insurance company	S	A
Living Media	Consumer services	Publishing	New Delhi	1975	Publisher	P	A
LYF	Consumer goods	Consumer electronics	Mumbai	2015	Computers, mobile handsets, part of Jio Platforms	P	A
Mahanadi Coalfields	Energy	Coal	Sambalpur	1992	Coal mining	S	A
Mahindra Aerospace	Industrials	Aerospace	Mumbai	2003	Light aircraft manufacturer	P	A
Mahindra & Mahindra	Consumer goods	Automobiles	Mumbai	1945	Automotive	P	A
Mahindra Group	Conglomerate	—	Mumbai	1945	Automotive, IT services, finance, hospitality, agribusiness, aerospace, defense, logistics, real estate	P	A
MakeMyTrip	Technology	Consumer digital services	Gurugram	2000	Travel & tourism	P	A
Mangalore Chemicals & Fertilizers	Chemicals	Fertilizers	Bengaluru	1974	Fertilizers	P	A
Marico	Consumer goods	Personal products	Mumbai	1991	Health and beauty	P	A
Maruti Suzuki	Consumer goods	Automobiles	New Delhi	1981	Automotive, part of Suzuki (Japan)	P	A
Max Group	Conglomerate	—	New Delhi	1985	Investment, financial services, healthcare	P	A
Max Healthcare	Health care	Health care providers	New Delhi	2001	Part of Max Group	P	A
Max Life Insurance	Financials	Life insurance	New Delhi	2001	Part of Max Group	P	A
Max Ventures and Industries	Real estate	Real estate holding & development	New Delhi	2015	Part of Max Group	P	A
Mazagon Dock Shipbuilders	Industrials	Shipbuilding	Mumbai	1934	Ship building	S	A
MECON	Industrials	Business support services	Ranchi	1973	Consulting	S	A
Mercator	Industrials	Marine transportation	Mumbai	1983	Shipping	P	A
Metro Brands	Consumer goods	Footwear	Mumbai	1947	Footwear	P	A
Microland	Technology	Software	Bengaluru	1989	Software consulting	P	A
Micromax Informatics	Consumer goods	Consumer electronics	Gurugram	2000	Consumer electronics, mobile handsets	P	A
Milky Mist Dairy	Consumer goods	Food products	Erode	1992	Dairy	P	A
Mindtree	Industrials	Business support services	Bengaluru	1999	Consulting, outsourcing	P	A
Mishra Dhatu Nigam	Basic materials	Metal fabricating	Hyderabad	1973	Alloys	P	A
MKU	Industrials	Defense	Kanpur	1985	Military equipment	P	A
MMTC Ltd	Financials	Investment services	New Delhi	1963	Foreign exchange	S	A
Modern Coach Factory, Raebareli	Industrials	Railroad equipment	Raebareli	2012	Part of Indian Railways	S	A
MOIL	Basic materials	General mining	Nagpur	1962	Mining	S	A
Moser Baer	Technology	Computer hardware	New Delhi	1983	Defunct in 2018, acquired by Vinpower, Inc. (USA)	P	D
Mother Dairy	Consumer goods	Food products	Noida	1974	Dairy	S	A
Mphasis	Industrials	Business support services	Bengaluru	2000	Consulting, outsourcing	P	A
MRF	Consumer goods	Tires	Chennai	1946	Tyres	P	A
MS Shoes	Consumer goods	Footwear	Delhi	1986	Footwear	P	A
MSTC Limited	Technology	Consumer digital services	Kolkata	1964	Metal trading, e-commerce	S	A
Mukand	Basic materials	Iron & steel	Mumbai	1937	Steel	P	A
Munitions India	Industrials	Defense	Kanpur	2021	Munitions	S	A
Murugappa Group	Conglomerate	—	Chennai	1900	Cycles, general insurance, fertilizers, abrasives, automotive chains, car door frames, steel tubes & gearboxes	P	A
Muthoot Finance	Financials	Investment services	Kochi	1939	Financial advice, trading	P	A
Myntra	Technology	Consumer digital services	Bengaluru	2009	E-commerce	P	A
National Aluminium Company	Basic materials	Aluminium	Bhubaneswar	1981	Aluminium	S	A
National Fertilizers	Chemicals	Fertilizers	Noida	1974	Fertilizers	S	A
National Mineral Development Corporation	Basic materials	General mining	Hyderabad	1958	Mining	S	A
National Payments Corporation of India	Technology	Consumer digital services	Mumbai	2008	Digital payment	S	A
Nayara Energy	Energy	Oil refining & marketing	Mumbai	2017	Major stock owned by Rosneft (Russia), 49.13%	P	A
NBC Bearings	Industrials	Electrical equipment & components	Jaipur	1946	Bearings	P	A
NBCC	Real estate	Real estate holding & development	New Delhi	1960	State-owned developer	S	A
NDTV	Consumer services	Broadcasting & entertainment	New Delhi	1988	Television	P	A
Network18 Group	Consumer services	Broadcasting & entertainment	Noida	1993	Mass media, part of Reliance Industries	P	A
NHPC	Utilities	Conventional electricity	Faridabad	1975	Hydroelectric	S	A
NIIT	Industrials	Business support services	Gurugram	1981	Consulting	P	A
Nilkamal Plastics	Chemicals	Specialty chemicals	Mumbai	1981	Industrial and consumer plastics	P	A
Nirma	Chemicals	Specialty chemicals	Ahmedabad	1990	Chemicals, cement, fast moving consumer goods	P	A
NLC India Limited	Utilities	Conventional electricity	Neyveli	1956	Thermal power generation	S	A
NTPC Limited	Utilities	Conventional electricity	New Delhi	1975	Thermal power generation	S	A
Nuclear Power Corporation of India	Utilities	Conventional electricity	Mumbai	1987	State nuclear power generation	S	A
Nykaa	Technology	Consumer digital services	Mumbai	2012	Online beauty products, e-commerce	P	A
Oil and Natural Gas Corporation	Energy	Integrated oil & gas	Dehradun	1956	State oil & gas exploration and production	S	A
Oil India	Energy	Integrated oil & gas	Duliajan	1959	Oil exploration and production	S	A
Ola Electric	Consumer goods	Automobiles	Bengaluru	2017	Motorcycles, electric vehicles	P	A
Omega Seiki Mobility	Consumer goods	Automobiles	New Delhi	2018	Automotive, electric vehicles	P	A
One97 Communications	Technology	Consumer digital services	Noida	2000	Ecommerce and fintech	P	A
Onida Electronics	Consumer goods	Consumer electronics	Mumbai	1981	Consumer electronics	P	A
Oracle Financial Services Software	Technology	Software	Mumbai	1990	Banking software	P	A
Paramount Airways	Consumer services	Airlines	Chennai	2005	Airline, defunct 2010	P	D
Parle Agro	Consumer goods	Food products	Mumbai	1984	Drinks	P	A
Parle Products	Consumer goods	Food products	Mumbai	1929	Food	P	A
Patanjali Ayurved	Consumer goods	Ayurvedic producers	Haridwar	2006	Ayurvedic & herbal products, cosmetics, personal products	P	A
Pawan Hans	Consumer services	Airlines	Noida	1985	Helicopter services	S	A
Pentamedia Graphics	Consumer services	Broadcasting & entertainment	Chennai	1976	Animation studio, digital services	P	A
Persistent Systems	Technology	Software	Nagpur	1990	Software, consulting	P	A
Petronet LNG	Energy	Oil refining & marketing	New Delhi	1998	Liquefied natural gas importer, joint of Oil and Natural Gas Corporation, GAIL, Indian Oil Corporation & Bharat Petroleum	S	A
Pidilite Industries	Chemicals	Specialty chemicals	Mumbai	1959	Adhesives, chemicals	P	A
Pine Labs	Technology	Consumer digital services	Noida	1998	Merchant payment	P	A
Piramal Group	Health care	Pharmaceuticals	Mumbai	1988	Pharma	P	A
Power Finance Corporation	Financials	Financial services	New Delhi	1986	State financing	S	A
Power Grid Corporation of India	Industrials	Industrial suppliers	Gurugram	1989	State power transmission infrastructures	S	A
PTC India	Financials	Financial services	New Delhi	1999	State power trading and financial solution	S	A
Praj	Chemicals	Specialty chemicals	Pune	1983	Ethanol plant, sugar processing	P	A
Punj Lloyd	Industrials	Construction	New Delhi	1998		P	A
Punjab & Sind Bank	Financials	Banks	New Delhi	1908	Bank	S	A
Punjab National Bank	Financials	Banks	New Delhi	1894	Bank	S	A
Protean eGov Technologies	Technology	Consumer digital services	Mumbai	1995	Digital public infrastructure	P	A
PVR INOX	Consumer services	Broadcasting & entertainment	Gurugram	1997	Movie theaters	P	A
PTC Industries Limited	Titanium/Nickel/Tungsten/Cobalt alloys	Alloy Metal Plant	Lucknow	1963	Aerospace-grade alloys	P	A
Raheja Developers	Real estate	Real estate holding & development	New Delhi	1990	Real estate	P	A
Rail India Technical and Economic Service	Industrials	Engineering and contracting services	Gurugram	1974	Consulting, part of Indian Railways	S	A
Rajesh Exports	Retail	Specialty retailers	Bengaluru	1989	Gold refining & jewellery retailer	P	A
Raheja Mindspace	Industrials	Business support services	Mumbai	1956	Industrial parks	P	A
Ramco Systems	Technology	Software	Chennai	1992	Software	P	A
Ranbaxy Laboratories	Health care	Pharmaceuticals	Gurugram	1961	Pharma	P	A
Rapido	Technology	Consumer digital services	Bengaluru	2015	Digital bike cabs platform	P	A
Rashtriya Chemicals & Fertilizers	Chemicals	Fertilizers	Mumbai	1978	Fertilizers	S	A
Rashtriya Ispat Nigam	Basic materials	Iron & steel	Visakhapatnam	1982	Steel	S	A
Raymond Group	Basic materials	Textile products	Mumbai	1925	Textiles	P	A
REC Limited	Financials	Financial services	New Delhi	1969	Electrical infrastructure financing	S	A
Rediff.com	Technology	Consumer digital services	Mumbai	1996	Information, shopping portal	P	A
Reliance Capital	Financials	Asset managers	Mumbai	1986	Part of Reliance Group	P	A
Reliance Communications	Telecommunications	Telecommunications service providers	Mumbai	2002	Part of Reliance Group	P	A
Reliance Digital	Retail	Specialty retailers	Mumbai	2007	Electronic items, part of Reliance Retail	P	A
Reliance Entertainment	Consumer services	Broadcasting & entertainment	Mumbai	2005	Part of Reliance Group	P	A
Reliance Group	Conglomerate	—	Mumbai	1966	Telecom, financials, industrials, consumer services	P	A
Reliance Health	Health care	Health care providers	Mumbai	2006	Part of Reliance Group	P	A
Reliance Industrial Infrastructure	Industrials	Construction	Mumbai	1988	Part of Reliance Industries	P	A
Reliance Industries	Conglomerate	—	Mumbai	1966	Oil & gas, industrials, consumer services, telecommunications	P	A
Reliance Infrastructure	Industrials	Construction	Mumbai	2002	Part of Reliance Group	P	A
Reliance Life Insurance	Financials	Life insurance	Mumbai	2001	Part of Reliance Group	P	A
Reliance MediaWorks	Consumer services	Broadcasting & entertainment	Mumbai	1975	Part of Reliance Group	P	A
Swan Defence and Heavy Industries Limited	Industrials	Shipbuilding	Rajula	1997	Purchased by Swan Energy in 2024	P	A
Reliance Power	Utilities	Conventional electricity	Navi Mumbai	2007	Thermal power generation, part of Reliance Group	P	A
Reliance Retail	Retail	Diversified retailers	Mumbai	2006	Supermarkets, part of Reliance Industries	P	A
Route Mobile	Technology	Consumer digital services	Mumbai	2004	Cloud computing	P	A
Royal Enfield	Consumer goods	Automobiles	Chennai	1955	Motorcycles	P	A
RPG Group	Conglomerate	—	Mumbai	1979	Technology, industrials	P	A
RP-Sanjiv Goenka Group	Conglomerate	—	Kolkata	2011	Industrials, beverages, sports club	P	A
Sahara India Pariwar	Conglomerate	—	Lucknow	1978	Financials, construction, media, retail	P	A
Samtel Avionics	Industrials	Aerospace & defense	New Delhi	2005	Aerospace & defense	P	A
Samtel Group	Conglomerate	—	New Delhi	1973	Electronics, defense, real estate, construction, education	P	A
Saravana Bhavan	Consumer goods	Food products	Chennai	1981	Food, sweets, bakery, ice cream	P	A
SAS Motors	Industrials	Agricultural & farm machinery	Faridabad	2004	Tractors	P	A
Sasken Technologies	Industrials	Business support services	Bengaluru	1989	Engineering	P	A
Sastra Robotics	Technology	Robotics	Kochi	2013	Robotics, AI automation	P	A
Sea6 Energy	Energy	Alternative energy	Bengaluru	2010	Biofuel	P	A
Serum Institute of India	Health care	Pharmaceuticals & biotechcnology	Pune	1966	Vaccines	P	A
Shapoorji Pallonji Group	Conglomerate	—	Mumbai	1865	Real estate, industrials, consumer goods	P	A
Shipping Corporation of India	Industrials	Marine transportation	Mumbai	1961	State-owned shipping	S	A
Shoppers Stop	Retail	Diversified retailers	Mumbai	1991	Clothing & home departmental stores	P	A
Shree Cement	Industrials	Cement	Kolkata	1979	Cement	P	A
Shree Ganesh Jewellery House	Retail	Specialty retailers	Kolkata	2002	Jeweler	P	A
Shree Renuka Sugars	Consumer goods	Food products	Belgaum	1998	Sugar	P	A
Shriram Group	Conglomerate	—	Chennai	1974	Financials, industrials, health care	P	A
Singareni Collieries Company	Energy	Coal	Kothagudem	1920	Coal mining	S	A
Skipper Limited	Industrials	Electrical equipment & components	Kolkata	1981	Electrical transmission infrastructure	P	A
Skyroot Aerospace	Industrials	Aerospace, space industry	Hyderabad	2018	Launch vehicles	P	A
Snapdeal	Technology	Consumer digital services	New Delhi	2010	E-commerce	P	A
Sobha	Real estate	Real estate holding & development	Bengaluru	1995	Developer	P	A
Sonata Software	Technology	Software	Bengaluru	1986	BI and analytics	P	A
South Indian Bank	Financials	Banks	Thrissur	1929	Private bank	P	A
SpiceJet	Consumer services	Airlines	Gurugram	2004	Low-cost airline	P	A
SSS Defence	Industrials	Defense	Bengaluru	2017	Firearms	P	A
State Bank of India	Financials	Banks	Mumbai	1806	State bank	S	A
Steel Authority of India Limited	Basic materials	Iron & steel	New Delhi	1954	State steel	S	A
Sterlite Copper	Basic materials	Copper	Kolkata	1975	Mining, part of Vedanta Resources (UK)	P	A
Sterlite Technologies	Telecommunications	Telecommunications equipment	Pune	2000	Optical fiber & cables, part of Vedanta Resources (UK)	P	A
Suminter India Organics	Consumer goods	Food products	Mumbai	2003	Organic products	P	A
Sun Group	Consumer services	Broadcasting & entertainment	Chennai	1992	TV, publisher	P	A
Sun Pharma	Health care	Pharmaceuticals	Mumbai	1983	Pharma	P	A
Surya Roshni	Industrials	Diversified industrials	Delhi	1973	Fans, PVC, kitchen appliances, lighting, steel	P	A
Suzlon	Utilities	Alternative electricity	Pune	1995	Turbines	P	A
Swiggy	Technology	Consumer digital services	Bengaluru	2014	Food delivery, online grocery	P	A
Synthite	Consumer goods	Food products	Kochi	1972	Value added spice extracts	P	A
T-Series	Consumer services	Broadcasting & entertainment	Noida	1983	Record and film producer	P	A
Tamil Nadu Newsprint and Papers Limited	Consumer services	Publishing	Chennai	1979	State publisher	S	A
Tamilnad Mercantile Bank	Financials	Banks	Thoothukudi	1921	Bank	P	A
Tanla Platforms	Technology	Consumer digital services	Hyderabad	1999	Cloud computing	P	A
Tara International	Consumer goods	Automobiles	Mumbai	?	Automotive, electric vehicles	P	A
Tata Advanced Systems	Industrials	Aerospace & defense	Hyderabad	2007	Aerospace, defense, part of Tata Sons	P	A
Tata Business Support Services	Industrials	Business support services	Hyderabad	2004	Part of Tata Sons	P	A
Tata Chemicals	Chemicals	Chemicals: diversified	Mumbai	1939	Part of Tata Sons	P	A
Tata Communications	Telecommunications	Telecommunications service providers	Mumbai	1986	Fixed-line telecommunications, part of Tata Sons	P	A
Tata Consultancy Services	Industrials	Business support services	Mumbai	1968	Part of Tata Sons	P	A
Tata Consumer Products	Consumer goods	Food products	Kolkata	1964	Tea, coffee, part of Tata Sons	P	A
Tata Group	Conglomerate	—	Mumbai	1868	Part of Tata Sons	P	A
Tata Hitachi Construction Machinery	Industrials	Commercial vehicles & parts	Bengaluru	1961	Heavy construction vehicles, joint venture of Tata Motors & Hitachi Construction Machinery (Japan)	P	A
Tata Interactive Systems	Industrials	Business support services	Mumbai and Kolkata	1990	Part of Tata Sons	P	A
Tata Marcopolo	Industrials	Commercial vehicles & parts	Mumbai	2008	Buses, part of Tata Motors	P	A
Tata Motors	Industrials	Commercial vehicles & parts	Mumbai	2024	Buses, trucks, defense vehicles, part of Tata Sons	P	A
Tata Motors Passenger Vehicles	Consumer goods	Automobiles	Mumbai	1945	Automotive, part of Tata Sons	P	A
Tata Play	Consumer services	Broadcasting & entertainment	Mumbai	2004	Satellite streaming, part of Tata Sons	P	A
Tata Power	Utilities	Conventional electricity	Mumbai	1910	Thermal power generation, part of Tata Sons	P	A
Tata Starbucks	Consumer services	Restaurants & bars	Mumbai	2012	Cafe chain, joint venture of Tata Consumer Products & Starbucks (US)	P	A
Tata Steel	Basic materials	Iron & steel	Mumbai	1907	Part of Tata Sons	P	A
Tata Steel BSL	Basic materials	Iron & steel	New Delhi	1987	Steel, defunct 2021	P	D
Tata Technologies	Industrials	Industrial engineering	Pune	1989	Engineering & design, IT services, part of Tata Sons	P	A
Tech Mahindra	Industrials	Business support services	Pune	1986	Consulting, BPO	P	A
Texmaco Rail & Engineering	Industrials	Railroad equipment	Kolkata	1939	Rail engineering	P	A
The Muthoot Group	Conglomerate	—	Kochi	1887	Financials, travel & leisure, healthcare, real estate	P	A
Thermax	Industrials	Electrical equipment & components	Pune	1980	Energy engineering	P	A
Thyrocare	Health care	Health care facilities	Navi Mumbai	1996	Diagnostic, preventive care laboratories	P	A
The Times Group	Consumer services	Broadcasting & entertainment	Mumbai	1838	Media conglomerate	P	A
Titagarh Rail Systems	Industrials	Railroad equipment	Kolkata	1984	Rail industry	P	A
Titan Company	Consumer goods	Clothing & accessories	Bengaluru	1984	Watches, luxury products	P	A
Torque Pharmaceuticals	Health care	Pharmaceuticals	Mohali	1985	Nutrition supplements	P	A
Torrent Group	Conglomerate	—	Ahmedabad	1959	Health care, industrials	P	A
Toyota Kirloskar Motor	Consumer goods	Automobiles	Bengaluru	1997	Automotive, joint venture of Kirloskar Group & Toyota (Japan)	P	A
Tractors and Farm Equipment Limited	Industrials	Agricultural & farm machinery	Chennai	1960	Tractors	P	A
TradeIndia	Technology	Consumer digital services	New Delhi	1996	Portal	P	A
Travancore Cochin Chemicals	Chemicals	Chemicals: diversified	Kochi	1961	Chemicals	S	A
Travancore Titanium Products	Chemicals	Specialty chemicals	Thiruvananthapuram	1946	Titanium dioxide	S	A
Troop Comforts	Industrials	Defense	Kanpur	2021	Military clothing & equipment	S	A
TTK Prestige	Consumer goods	Durable household products	Chennai	1955	Cookware	P	A
TVS Motor Company	Consumer goods	Automobiles	Chennai	1978	Motorcycles	P	A
UCO Bank	Financials	Banks	Kolkata	1943	State bank	S	A
UltraTech Cement	Industrials	Cement	Mumbai	1983	Cement	P	A
Union Bank of India	Financials	Banks	Mumbai	1919	State bank	S	A
Unitech Group	Real estate	Real estate holding & development	New Delhi	1972	Real estate development	P	A
United Breweries Group	Conglomerate	—	Bengaluru	1857	Food & beverage, engineering, financials, part of Heineken (Netherlands)	P	A
UPL	Chemicals	Specialty chemicals	Mumbai	1969	Chemicals	P	A
USV	Health care	Pharmaceuticals	Navi Mumbai	1961	Pharma	P	A
V-Guard Industries	Consumer goods	Consumer electronics	Kochi	1977	Electrical goods, home appliances	P	A
VA Tech Wabag	Utilities	Water	Chennai	1924	Water treatment	P	A
Vadilal	Conglomerate	—	Ahmedabad	1907	Chemicals, food & beverage, financials	P	A
Vedanta Limited	Conglomerate	—	New Delhi	1979	Mining, oil & gas, utility, steel, part of Vedanta Resources (UK)	P	A
Vicco Group	Health care	Ayurvedic producers	Mumbai	1952	Alternative medicines	P	A
Videocon Group	Conglomerate	—	Mumbai	1979	Industrials, consumer goods, oil & gas, owned by Vedanta Resources (UK)	P	A
Vijaya Bank	Financials	Banks	Bengaluru	1931	State bank	S	A
Vinod Intelligent Cookware	Consumer goods	Durable consumer toods	Palghar	1962	Cookware	S	A
VIP Industries	Consumer goods	Recreational products	Mumbai	1971	Luggage	P	A
Vodafone Idea	Telecommunications	Telecommunications services	Mumbai	2018	Mobile network, joint venture of Aditya Birla Group & Vodafone (UK)	P	A
Voltas	Consumer goods	Consumer electronics	Mumbai	1954	Home appliances	P	A
Voltas Beko	Consumer goods	Consumer electronics	Mumbai	2017	Home appliances, joint venture of Voltas & Arçelik (Turkey)	P	A
Voonik	Technology	Consumer digital services	Bengaluru	2013	Online marketplace	P	A
VST Industries	Consumer goods	Tobacco	Hyderabad	1930	Tobacco	P	A
Wadia Group	Conglomerate	—	Mumbai	1736	Chemicals, industrials	P	A
Walchandnagar Industries	Conglomerate	—	Mumbai	1908	Energy, transportation, nuclear industry	P	A
WAPCOS Limited	Industrials	Engineering and contracting services	New Delhi	1969	Engineering & consultancy	P	A
Welspun Corp	Industrials	Diversified industrials	Mumbai	1995	Part of Welspun World	P	A
Welspun Energy	Utilities	Alternative electricity	New Delhi	2002	Solar power generation, part of Welspun World	P	A
Welspun Living	Basic materials	Textile products	Mumbai	1985	Textiles, part of Welspun World	P	A
Welspun World	Conglomerate	—	Mumbai	1985	Steel, energy, investments, retail	P	A
West Bengal Electronics Industry Development Corporation	Industrials	Electronic equipment & components	Kolkata	1974	Capacitors, driven equipment, picture tubes, telephone exchanges	S	A
West Bengal State Co-Operative Bank	Financials	Banks	Kolkata	1918	State bank	S	A
Wipro	Industrials	Business support services	Bengaluru	1945	Consulting, BPO	P	A
XOLO	Consumer goods	Consumer electronics	Noida	2012	Mobile handsets	P	A
Yantra India	Industrials	Defense	Nagpur	2021	Defence equipment	S	A
Yatra	Consumer services	Travel & tourism	Gurugram	2006	Travel agency	P	A
Yebhi	Technology	Consumer digital services	Gurugram	2009	E-commerce	P	A
Yepme	Technology	Consumer digital services	Gurugram	2011	E-commerce	P	A
Yes Bank	Financials	Banks	Mumbai	2004	Private bank	P	A
Zandu Realty	Health care	Ayurvedic producers	Mumbai	1910	Alternative medicines, part of Emami	P	A
Zee Entertainment Enterprises	Consumer services	Broadcasting & entertainment	Mumbai	1992	Broadcaster	P	A
Zee News	Consumer services	Broadcasting & entertainment	Mumbai	1999	News channel	P	A
Zensar Technologies	Technology	Software & IT services	Pune	1991	IT services and software	P	A
Zeta	Technology	Consumer digital services	Mumbai	2015	Fintech	P	A
Zoho Corporation	Technology	Software	Chennai	1996	Business management software	P	A
Zomato	Technology	Consumer digital services	Gurugram	2008	Food delivery	P	A
Zydus Lifesciences	Health care	Pharmaceuticals	Ahmedabad	1952	Pharma	P	A

== See also ==
- Conglomerates in India
- List of telecom companies in India
- Brand India
- Digital India
- India Inc.
- Look East policy
- Make in India
- MyGov.in
