= Exide (disambiguation) =

Exide (Exide Technologies) was an American lead-acid batteries manufacturing company.

Exide may also refer to:

- Exide lead contamination
- Exide Industries, Indian battery manufacturer
- Exide Life Insurance, Indian insurance company

== See also ==
- DieHard (brand)
- Yuasa-Exide Inc, Japanese battery manufacturer
- 1999 Exide NASCAR Select Batteries 400, a 1999 race
