= Antara Senior Living =

Indian healthcare company

- Company type: Public limited company
- Industry: Assisted Living, Retirement community, Independent senior living
- Founded: 2011
- Headquarters: New Delhi, India
- Area served: Dehradun, Noida
- Key people: Tara Singh Vachani (chairperson); Rajit Mehta (managing director)
- Services: Housing, healthcare, wellness
- Number of employees: c. 200
- Parent: Max Group
- Website: www.antaraseniorcare.com

Antara Senior Living is an Indian enterprise owned by Max India that runs independent senior living and retirement communities in India. It was established in 2011, and has drawn attention from the Indian media for being among the first organised projects to venture into retirement or assisted living, a space that has often been stigmatised by conservative sections of the Indian society.

== History ==
Antara Senior Living was conceptualised in 2010 by Tara Singh Vachani, daughter of Max Group founder Analjit Singh, after noting the lack of quality, organised assisted living projects in India. Vachani decided to leverage the parent group's businesses to set up a retirement community model that could offer hospitality, healthcare, wellness and real estate. The first community opened in April 2017 in Dehradun, Uttarakhand. Antara was the subject of a 2018 case study taught at the Indian School of Business, which explored how it deals with cultural stigma associated with Indian retirement communities and considers the possibilities of changing mindsets in society at large. In 2019, Rajit Mehta, former CEO of Max Healthcare, was appointed the managing director and CEO of Antara.

== Properties and services ==
As of 2020, Antara runs 2 communities in the country: in Dehradun and Noida, Uttar Pradesh. The Dehradun property was designed by the New York-based architecture firm, Perkins Eastman, and constructed by the Shapoorji Pallonji Group, headquartered in Mumbai. Antara operates campus-style communities that offer independent living, personalised assisted living, and nursing and home health services.
