= Baddi =

- Industrial city
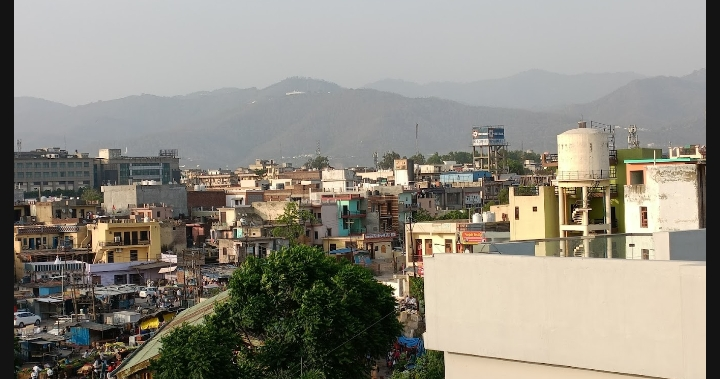
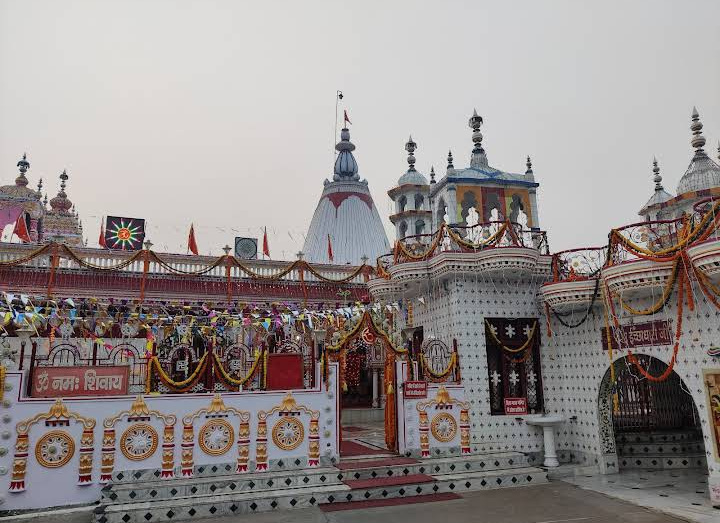
- From top to bottom: Uphill view of Baddi city, Ichhadhari Temple located in city

- Location in Himachal Pradesh Baddi (India)
- Coordinates: 30.928°N 76.796°E
- Country: India
- State: Himachal Pradesh
- District: Solan
- Elevation: 426 m (1,398 ft)

Population (2024)
  - Total: 29,911
  - Rank: 5 in HP

Languages
  - Official: Hindi
  - Native: Puadhi, Mahasui (Baghati); (Hinduri)
- Time zone: UTC+5:30 (IST)
- PIN: 173205
- Telephone code: 01795 (Nalagarh)
- Vehicle registration: HP 12 (Nalagarh)
- Website: https://himachal.nic.in/en-IN/

Baddi is an industrial city and Municipal Council, near Solan city and Chandigarh in the southwestern Solan district of Himachal Pradesh, India. It is part of the BBN (Baddi-Barotiwala-Nalagarh) industrial area. The town lies on the border of Himachal Pradesh, Punjab and Haryana states in the Shivalik Hills, around 65 kilometres (40 mi) west of Solan city. Baddi has biggest truck union and largest pharmaceutical hub in whole of the Asia.

== Geography ==
Baddi's geographic coordinates are 30.928°N 76.796°E. The town is situated at an average elevation of 426 metres (1397 ft).

== Climate ==
Baddi has been ranked 14th best "National Clean Air City" under (Category 3 population under 3 lakhs cities) in India.

== Demographics ==
According to the 2011 Census of India, Baddi town had a population of 29,911 with 19,332 males and 10,579 females. There were 3,883 children below the age of six years. The sex ratio and child sex ratio of the town stood at 547 and 831 respectively. The literacy rate was 86.33%, higher than the state average of 82.80%.

== Economy ==
Baddi is home to multiple pharmaceutical companies which have established manufacturing plants and R&D hubs in the town. The town is Asia's biggest pharmaceuticals hub and is home to some of the largest pharmaceutical companies including Cipla, Dr. Reddy's Laboratories, Cadila Healthcare, Torrent Pharmaceuticals, Abbott Laboratories, Glenmark Pharmaceuticals, and Manjushree Technopack.

Baddi houses a total of 3,120 factories belonging to leading pharma, FMCG and textile companies among others and which generate an annual turnover of Rs 60,000 crore. Baddi employs one-third of all persons engaged in Himachal's medium and large industries. In terms of revenue, the town contributes half of the state's total revenues generated from industries. In April, 2019, the department of commerce undertook inauguration of Engineering Exports Promotion Council office in Nalagarh inaugurated by Mr. Prashant Deshta- Sub-Divisional Magistrate Nalagarh (SDM) to ease up International Export in the region.

Baddi is also a large hub for the Cosmetic industry, specifically for third party cosmetic manufacturing, some notable names being AVN Footsteps, Vista and JP Healthcare.

== Education ==
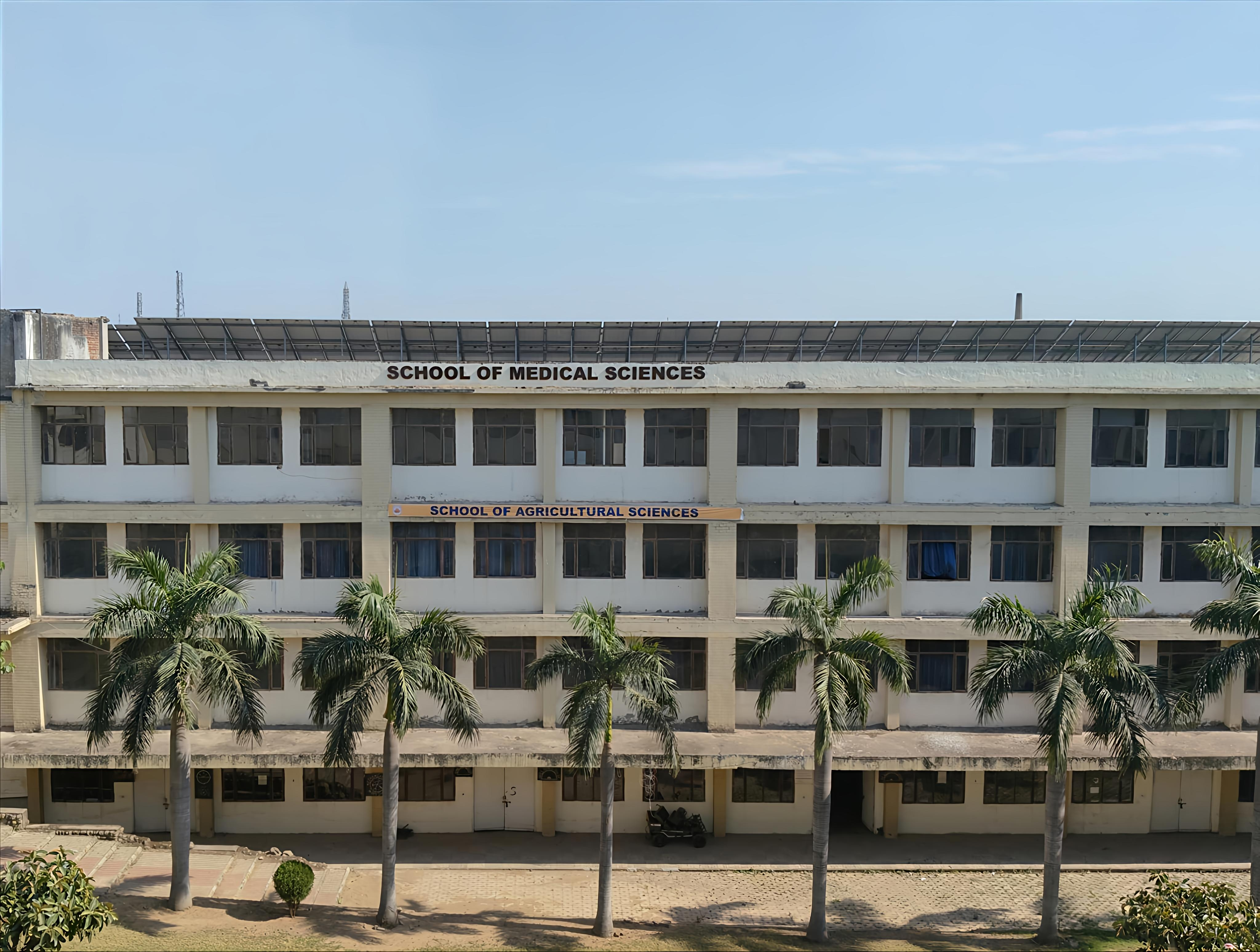
Baddi University of Emerging Sciences and Technology

Educational institutes in and nearby Baddi are:

- Baddi University of Emerging Sciences and Technology
- IEC University
- Maharaja Agrasen University
