= Skipper Limited =

Indian electricity transmission tower manufacturing company

- Formerly: Skipper Investments Limited; Skipper Steels Limited
- Type: Public
- Traded as: NSE: SKIPPER; BSE: 538562
- ISIN: INE439E01022
- Industry: Iron, Steel
- Founded: 1981; 45 years ago in Kolkata, India
- Founder: Sadhu Ram Bansal
- Headquarters: Kolkata, West Bengal, India
- Area served: Worldwide
- Key people: Sajan Kumar Bansal (Managing director); Amit Kiran Deb (Chairman); Sharan Bansal (Director); Devesh Bansal (Director); Siddharth Bansal (Director)
- Revenue: ▲₹1711.09 Crore (March 2022)
- Total assets: ₹1166 Crore (2022)
- Number of employees: 2135 (2021)
- Parent: SK Bansal Group
- Subsidiaries: Skipper Pipes
- Website: Official website

Skipper Limited is an Indian transmission and distribution structure manufacturing company, founded in 1981. It is headquartered in Kolkata, India. The company is a part of the SK Bansal Group, promoted by Sajan Kumar Bansal. Skipper Limited operates in the power transmission and distribution and polymer pipes and fittings segment with presence across sub-segments such as Towers, EPC, Monopoles and Poles. It is the third largest company in India in terms of manufacturing capacity of Power T&D structures. It exports to over forty countries across South America, Europe, Africa, the Middle East, South Asia and Australia.

In 2021, the company was ranked at #61 in Fortune magazine's "Next 500" list of Indian companies. Skipper Limited was listed in India's Top 500 Companies 2016 and 2021 list by Dun & Bradstreet.

== History ==
The company was incorporated as Skipper Investments Limited in 1981. It was renamed Skipper Steels Limited in 1990 and diversified to manufacture Telecom Towers and High Masts. It changed its name to Skipper Limited in 2009. It set up an LPG Gas Cylinder unit in 2001, followed by establishing its first tube mill in 2003. In 2005, the company set up its first Galvanising plant. Skipper received Power grid approval for the Tower unit and got an order for 400kV towers in 2006.

In 2007, it forayed into the value addition of Steel Tubes as scaffolding. In 2009, Skipper Limited received an order for 800KV transmission tower from Power Grid Corporation of India Limited. It also commissioned a Polymer production manufacturing Unit in Uluberia, West Bengal and a double side Tube GI Plant in 2009.

In April 2015, Skipper Limited set up a PVC manufacturing facility in Ahmedabad, Gujarat, with a capacity of 10,000 metric tonnes. The Ahmedabad plant was commissioned with an investment of ₹ 50 crores. In December 2015, Skipper entered the Northeast India by commissioning its manufacturing plant in Guwahati, Assam with a capacity to manufacture 4000 MTPA of plumbing and agricultural pipes.

In January 2016, the company set up one of India's largest galvanizing plants in Uluberia, West Bengal. The plant is meant for structures that are 2.5m in diameter and 12m in length. The total galvanizing capacity of the plant is 8000 tonnes per month. It set up a PVC products plant in Sikandrabad, Uttar Pradesh in 2016, which has a capacity of about 8,000 metric tonnes.

In March 2017, the company invested ₹70 crores and set up a new plant in Palasbari, Guwahati, which has a capacity to manufacture 30,000 tonnes of engineering products and 7000 tonnes of polymer products annually.

== Operations ==
Skipper Limited is engaged in the power distribution and transmission infrastructure sectors. It exports its products to more than forty countries, including those in South America, Europe, Africa, the Middle East, South Asia and Southeast Asia, and Australia. It undertakes activity from angle rolling to fabrication and galvanising, proto assembly, load testing and EPC line construction.

Under the brand name Skipper Pipes, it manufactures polymer pipes and fittings that serve the agricultural and plumbing sectors. Skipper has 20% of its business coming from the PVC pipes segment and infrastructure projects. Skipper Pipes has a turnover of ₹330 crores in 2022, contributing to around 19 percent of Skipper's total revenues. Skipper Pipes was started in 2009–2010. The company mainly focused on the eastern and northeastern markets until 2015–2016. It slowly started covering other markets in 2017. As of 2022, it has about 120 distributors and 18,000 retailers across India.

As of 2018, Skipper Limited has three manufacturing facilities in Howrah district in West Bengal, two in Guwahati, Assam and one in Hyderabad. As of 2017, the capacity of the engineering products division is 230,000 MTPA, while the capacity of the polymer division is 48,000 MTPA. It has 175,000 tonnes of tower-making capacity.

As of 2017, the cumulative production capacity of the Skipper Limited was 300000 MTPA.

== Partnership ==
Skipper Limited tied up with Ramboll, a Danish Engineering company as a manufacturing partner, in the year 2006. In 2015, it entered into a partnership with global giant Japan-based Sekisui Chemical as a technology tie-up for manufacturing CPVC Pipes in India. It partnered with the Netherlands-based Wavin Group for exclusive rights to sell the Hep2o Polybutylene push-fit plumbing systems.

In 2017, Skipper Limited formed a joint venture with Israel-based Metzerplas, a manufacturer of irrigation equipment.

In 2025, Skipper Limited has entered into a partnership with Lubrizol to incorporate Temprite CPVC technology into its piping products.

== Financials ==
The company reported total revenue of ₹1,711.09 crores in March 2022, while it had registered ₹1,585.53 crores in March 2021. In the financial year 2019–20, the company recorded total revenue of ₹1,392.47 crores.

In June 2018, the company reported a fall of 15% in net profit for the last quarter, with analysts blaming the drop on the decision to diversify into PVC pipes.

In the financial year 2016, the segment-wise revenue performance of the company was ₹13,260 million for engineering products, ₹1,525 million for polymer products and ₹277 million for infrastructure projects.

It registered a 232 per cent annual growth in its net profit at ₹89 crores for the fiscal year 2015. The company's revenue grew by 26 per cent during the same period to ₹ 1,313 crores. The power T&D business contributed 80 per cent share in the company's overall Rs 1,450 crore revenues for the financial year 2014–15. In 2013–14, it reported revenue of ₹1,165 crore.

== IPO ==
In 2015, Skipper Limited was listed at Bombay Stock Exchange with a market capitalization of over ₹15, 000 million (as of March 2015 ending). In 2016, it was listed in the National Stock Exchange of India with a capital of ₹13,634 million (as of 31 March 2016).

== Awards and recognition ==
In December 2015, Skipper Limited won CBIP Award for the Best Industry in Water Resource Sector for manufacturing Plastic Piping Systems from the Central Board of Irrigation and Power, Ministry of Water Resources, River Development & Ganga Rejuvenation and the Government of India. The award was presented by Uma Bharti, the Union Minister. The company received the Star Performer award at the 48th EEPC India National Export Awards 2015 by the Engineering Exports Promotion Council.

Skipper Limited has been listed as a Fortune Next 500 company for the year 2020, 2021 and 2022. In 2022, it was ranked #61 on Fortune Next 500 list under the iron and steel category, by Fortune India.

Year	Name	Awarding organisation	Result
2015	CNBC Award for the Fastest Growing Transmission Tower Manufacturing Company	CNBC	Won
2015	CBIP Award for the Best Industry in Water Resource Sector	Central Board of Irrigation and Power, Ministry of Water Resources, River Development and Ganga Rejuvenation	Won
2015–2016	Star Performer Award Product Group – Other fabricated metal products excl machinery and equipment, Large Enterprise	Engineering Exports Promotion Council; Ministry of Commerce and Industry	Won
2016	Most Ethical Company - Engineering & Design	World CSR Day Asian Confederation of Businesses, World Federation of CSR and World Sustainability	Won
2016	Largest Tower Supplier Award	Power Grid Corporation of India Limited	Won
2017	Emerging EPC Player in Power Transmission	EPC World	Won
2017	Global HR Excellence Award for Continuous HR Innovation for Business Excellence	World HRD Congress	Won
2016–2017	The Emerging No.1 Brand of the Year	WCRC	Won
2018	Dream Companies To Work For - Manufacturing Sector, Ranked #33	ET Now	Won
2019	Dream Companies To Work For - Manufacturing Sector, Ranked #15	ET Now	Won
2021	Dream Company to Work for	National Feather Awards, The Economic Times	Won
