= Torque Pharmaceuticals =

Indian pharmaceutical company

- Formation: 1985
- Founder: P.S. Chhatwal
- Type: private

Torque pharmaceuticals is an Indian pharmaceutical company with production units at Issapur, Derabassi in Punjab and at Jharmajri, Baddi in Himachal Pradesh. It manufactures medicines for prevention and treatment of various health related problems. The product range comprises antibiotics, nutritional supplements and cough syrup to antipyretics and anti-inflammatory products.

== History ==
Torque Pharmaceuticals was started as a partnership in August 1985 with a small investment of 240,000 INR (US$18000). It started with the production of oral liquids, with manufacturing of tablets starting in 1987. In 1991, after the acquisition of Mac Brown, the manufacturing of small volume parenterals and exports to Uganda commenced. A manufacturing unit was set up at Derabassi, Himachal Pradesh in 1994 and the company was named as Torque Pharmaceuticals Pvt. Ltd., which started the manufacture of parenterals in 2002. In the same year exports to Mozambique and Angola were started. A WHO-GMP Compliance Certificate was awarded by the Drug Regulatory Authorities in the year 2005, as was ISO 9001-2000 certification. The National Drugs Authority (NDA), Uganda certified TORQUE for export of medicines. Another unit was added in Baddi, Himachal Pradesh in 2006.

Under the campaign to promote Torex Cough Syrup, renowned singer Jagjit Singh was chosen as its ambassador in 2007. The next year the company was inspected by Pharmacy and Poisons Board Kenya and subsequently approved. The existing facilities were further expanded in 2010 with acquisition of 200,000 sq. ft. of constructed area in Baddi. More products were launched under the brand name; Ketomac shampoo and No Scars. Next year, other brands were acquired from Ochoa Labs, such as Canstat, Terbofin and Zincoa. The personal care segment was started with introduction of Ketomac Hair Oil in 2012. A year later, the traditional distribution system of its logistical network was changed to DTS. At present, increases in sales volumes are being stressed.

== Recognition ==
Torque has been awarded NSIC-CRISIL SE1B credit rating for ‘Highest Performance Capability & Moderate Financial Strength’, NDA (Uganda) Certification, Certification from Pharmacy & Poisons Board (Kenya) and is a member of Basic Chemicals, Pharmaceuticals & Cosmetics Export Promotion Council (CHEMEXCIL), Delhi Chamber of Commerce, Pharmexil and Pharmabiz.
