= ELitmus =

Indian job placement company

eLitmus
- Type: Private
- Industry: Recruitment
- Founded: Bengaluru, Karnataka, India (March 28, 2005; 21 years ago)
- Headquarters: HSR Layout, Bengaluru, India
- Area served: Worldwide
- Key people: Aseem Marwaha (Director, Solutioning & Strategic Initiatives); Shireesh Jayashetty (Director, Technology); Satish Prasad (Director, Finance & Administration)
- Products: pH Test
- Website: eLitmus.com

eLitmus Evaluation Private Limited is an Indian company that helps companies in hiring employees for entry-level jobs. It was founded in the year 2005 by former employees of Infosys. Some of the Fortune 500 companies hire their employees through the pH test conducted by eLitmus.

== History ==
The company was founded on 28 March 2005 by the former employees of Infosys. and was promoted by IT recruitment firm Browse Consulting India Pvt Ltd. In its first year of operation, 53 companies, including Fortune 500 companies such as Dell and General Electric hired through pH Test. In May 2012, eLitmus acquired San Francisco based Professional Aptitude Council that had launched GILD in May 2010.

== pH Test ==
pH Test or Hiring Potential Test is an assessment exam conducted by eLitmus. Companies use pH Test as a criterion for hiring employees. The test consists of three parts- the Quantitative section, the Verbal section and the Reasoning section. Results are declared in two formats: percentile score and total score. Companies call test-takers for interviews on the basis of pH score and their own criteria.

The first pH Test was held on 24 April 2005 across 12 cities of India and was taken by 930 candidates. This value increased to more than 62,000 candidates taking the test in 2011 across more than 37 cities of India.

Many top IT companies such as Accenture, Collabera, McAfee and Novell, IBM, CGI, among others have used the eLitmus pH score on numerous occasions to recruit candidates.

== See also ==
- Employment
- Executive search
