= Satish Kumar Kaura =

Indian technocrat (born 1944)

- Born: 18 December 1944 (age 81); India
- Occupations: Technocrat; Industrialist
- Awards: Padma Shri; IITK Distinguished Alumnus Award; WWF Care for Nature Award; Electronics Man of the Year; SID Special Recognition Award; UP Transformational Leadership Award; EFY Group Lifetime Achievement Award

Satish Kumar Kaura is an Indian technocrat, industrialist and the founder of Samtel Group, where he holds the post of the chairman. He is also the chairman and managing director of Samcor Glass Limited and the executive director of Samtel Colour Limited. An elected Fellow of the Indian National Academy of Engineering (INAE), Kaura is the first recipient of the Distinguished Alumnus Award of the Indian Institute of Technology, Kanpur. The Government of India awarded him the fourth highest civilian honour of the Padma Shri, in 2004, for his contributions to Indian industrial sector.

== Biography ==
S. K. Kaura was born in a middle-class family on 18 December 1944 and joining the Indian Institute of Technology, Kanpur, he graduated in electrical engineering (BTech) in 1966. Later, he moved to Canada and secured a master's degree (MS) in electronics from Carleton University. Returning to India, he founded Samtel Group in 1973 and established Teletube Electronics Limited, a small industry for manufacturing television picture tubes, in 1974. This was followed by two more ventures, Samtel India Limited in 1981 and an engineering firm, Samtel Engineering and Sourcing Solutions, in 1983. In 1986, he established Samtel Color Limited, with technical and commercial collaborations with conglomerates like Sumitomo Corporation and Mitsubishi Electric Corporation and the company had an installed capacity of 10 million picture tubes per annum. He also set up Samtel Display Systems (Later renamed Samtel Avionics Ltd.) for manufacturing of high-technology products for avionics and military applications, rugged displays, cockpit displays and equipment for military and commercial platforms. His son Puneet Kaura is the Managing Director and Chief Executive Officer of Samtel Avionics Ltd. Samtel Avionics has two joint venture companies, Samtel HAL Display Systems, in association with Hindustan Aeronautics Limited in 2006, for the manufacture of electronic display systems and Samtel Thales Avionics Limited, joining with the French multinational, Thales Group in 2010, for the manufacture of Helmet-Mounted Sight and Display Systems and modern Avionics Systems. Samtel Glass Limited, incorporated in 1986, and Samtel Machines and Projects Limited are the other companies founded by Satish Kumar Kaura. The Group, as of 2005, has an employee strength of 4500 and has nine factories spread across India and Germany.

Kaura has been associated with the Confederation of Indian Industry (CII), as the president of its Northern Chapter, co-chairman of the National Committee on Defence and as the chairman of the Industrial Policy Committee. He has served as the president of the Electronic Industries Association of India and has been on the board of ICICI Group, SRF Limited, Infinity I, Fame Mercantile, Capfin Leasing, Blue Bell Trade Link, and Parsec Technologies (India). He is also a former member of the Review Committee of the Defence Research and Development Organisation (DRDO) and the Scientific Advisory Council, attached to the office of the Prime Minister of India.

== Awards and honours ==
Kaura is an elected Fellow of the Indian National Academy of Engineering (INAE) and a member of the governing council of the Institute of Management Technology, Ghaziabad (IMT-G) and the Indian Institute of Technology, Mandi. When the Indian Institute of Technology, Kanpur instituted the Distinguished Alumnus Award in 1989, he was the first to receive it. He received the Care for Nature Award of the World Wide Fund for Nature in 1994 from Prince Philip, the then president of the organisation. Lucknow Management Association awarded him the Uttar Pradesh Transformational Leadership Award to him in 2002 and the Government of India included him in the 2004 Republic Day Honours list for the civilian award of the Padma Shri. The Special Recognition Award of the Society for Information Display reached him in 2005 as also the Electronics Man of the Year of the Electronic Industries Association of India and Consumer Electronics and TV Manufacturers' Association. The Electronics For You Group honoured him with their Lifetime Achievement Award in 2007.

== See also ==
- Samtel Group
