= Max Estates Limited =

Indian real estate development company

- Formerly: Max Ventures and Industries Limited
- Type: Public
- Traded as: BSE: 544008; NSE: MAXESTATES
- Industry: Real estate
- Founded: 2016
- Founder: Analjit Singh
- Headquarters: Noida, Uttar Pradesh, India
- Area served: Delhi NCR, India
- Key people: Analjit Singh (Chairman); Sahil Vachani (Vice Chairman & MD); Vachan Singh (COO – Projects)
- Products: Commercial property; Residential property
- Revenue: ₹5,305 crore (FY26 pre-sales)
- Owner: Max Group
- Website: maxestates.in

Max Estates Limited (formerly Max Ventures and Industries Limited) is a publicly listed Indian real estate development company headquartered in Noida, Uttar Pradesh. It operates as the real estate arm of the Max Group.

Originally established in 2016, the company underwent a corporate scheme of arrangement through which its former holding parent, Max Ventures and Industries Limited (MVIL), reverse-merged into Max Estates Limited. Following the restructuring, the company became a pure-play real estate entity listed on the Bombay Stock Exchange (BSE: 544008) and the National Stock Exchange of India (NSE: MAXESTATES).

== Design Philosophy ==
The company develops commercial and residential spaces incorporating architectural principles themed around employee and resident well-being, marketed under its "WorkWell" and "LiveWell" design frameworks.

== Projects ==
=== Commercial ===
- Max Towers (Noida): A Grade-A+ commercial office development located at Sector 16B, holding LEED Platinum certification.
- Max House (Okhla, New Delhi): An operational corporate office development featuring LEED Gold certification.
- Max Square (Noida Expressway): An operational commercial campus featuring biophilic interior architecture, certified IGBC Platinum.
- Max District (Gurugram): A planned mixed-use commercial development situated in Sector 59.

=== Residential ===
- 222 Rajpur (Dehradun): A completed residential villa community.
- Estate 128 (Sector 128, Noida): A residential development along the Noida Expressway corridor.
- Estate 105 (Sector 105, Noida): A residential community planned with movement-focused layout integration.
- Estate 360 (Sector 36A, Gurugram): An intergenerational residential community along the Dwarka Expressway corridor.
- Estate 361 (Sector 36A, Gurugram): A residential development project.
- Max One (Sector 16B, Noida): An integrated live-work campus development.

== Sustainability and Financials ==
In FY26, Max Estates reported total pre-sales of ₹5,305 crore. In ESG evaluations, the developer received a 5-Star rating in the Global Real Estate Sustainability Benchmark (GRESB) in 2025 across both its commercial and residential operational streams.
