= Max Group =

Indian conglomerate company

- Type: Public
- Industry: Conglomerate
- Founded: 1985; 41 years ago
- Founder: Analjit Singh
- Headquarters: Max House, New Delhi, India
- Area served: India
- Key people: Analjit Singh (group chairman); Rahul Khosla (group president); Mohit Talwar(group vice-chairman)
- Products: Life insurance; Real estate; Independent senior living
- Revenue: ▲US$3.2 billion (2019)
- Number of employees: 27,000 (2019)
- Subsidiaries: Max India; Max Financial Services; Max Estates

Max Group is an Indian conglomerate headquartered in New Delhi, operating in the fields of life insurance, real estate and independent senior living. It was founded in 1985 by Analjit Singh.

Max Group companies include Max Financial Services, Max Estates, and Max India.

== History ==
Max Group traces its origin to the company inherited by Analjit Singh in 1985, following the death of his father Bhai Mohan Singh, founder of pharmaceutical company Ranbaxy Laboratories. Then named Max India (same as that of the current publicly listed Max Group company), it started as a manufacturer of an active drug compound for penicillin. In 1993, the group ventured into telecommunications by forming a joint venture with Hutchison Asia Telecom Group, called Max Telecom. Max Telecom was later sold to Vodafone and became Vodafone India. The group shifted its focus from being a B2B to B2C company in 2000, by foraying into the fields of healthcare and life insurance. Axis Max Life Insurance was founded in 2000.

== Structure ==
Three publicly listed holding companies fall under Max Group: Max Financial Services, Max Estates and Max India. The three holding companies have their own separate subsidiaries. The structure is as follows:

Max India

- Antara Senior Living (senior living)

Max Financial Services

- Max Life Insurance

Max Estates

- Max Asset Services (real estate services)
- Max I. Limited (venture capital)

== Governance and financials ==
The group is led by Analjit Singh and a board of directors. Each holding company under the group operates independently and has its own board of directors and shareholders. In 2019, the group posted revenues of $3.2 billion.
