= Samtel Avionics =

Aerospace and defence manufacturer headquartered in Delhi, India

- Type: Private
- Industry: Aerospace and Defence
- Founded: 2005
- Founder: Satish Kumar Kaura
- Headquarters: Delhi, India
- Key people: Satish Kumar Kaura (Chairman - Samtel Group); Puneet Kaura (Managing Director & CEO)
- Website: www.samtelavionics.com

Samtel Avionics is an Indian company headquartered in Delhi. It manufactures equipment and systems for avionics, military, industrial, and professional applications. Samtel Avionics is a subsidiary of the Samtel Group.

== History ==
In 2008, the multi-functional displays developed by Samtel and the Defence Avionics Research Establishment (DARE) wing of the Indian Defence Research and Development Organization (DRDO) were approved for air worthiness and real-time flight trials, on board the SU-30 aircraft of the Indian Air Force.

In 2009, Samtel Avionics signed a deal with Honeywell Aerospace, to manufacture avionics equipment for Electronic flight instrument system (EFIS), making it the first Indian manufacturer and sole supplier worldwide of this equipment for EFIS.

In 2012, Samtel Thales JV entered an agreement with Thales to supply cockpit displays to Dassault, the manufacturer of the French Rafale on the purchase of the Rafale aircraft by Indian Air Force. Thales is a consortium partner with Dassault in the manufacturing of Rafale aircraft.

In 2012, Samtel Avionics and Defence Systems signed a contract with Curtiss-Wright Controls Defense Solutions, for the supply of display head assemblies for the customers of Curtiss-Wright, such as Eurocopter, Agusta Westland, Sikorsky, etc.

In 2014, Samtel signed a cooperation agreement with General Dynamics Canada, for the co-production of digital displays for various military and non-military vehicles.

In 2017, Samtel and Hanwha Systems of South Korea entered a partnership agreement, to manufacture various missile electronics in India, with an aim to domestically produce critical parts for laser-guided bombs, missiles, and electronic warfare systems.

=== Joint Venture ===
In 2006, Samtel entered a joint venture with Hindustan Aeronautics Limited, the first public-private partnership in the sector. In 2009, the organization entered a joint venture agreement with Thales Air Defence, a France-based defence equipment manufacturer. The wholly owned subsidiaries of Thales Group, Thales Avionics and Thales International India, have invested 26% of the stakes in the joint venture.

In 2010, Samtel HAL Display Systems, a joint venture between Samtel Avionics and Hindustan Aeronautics Limited, won a development order worth more than US$50 million, for the manufacture of indigenous multi-functional displays.

In 2013, Samtel Thales Avionics played a key role in the upgrade of Mirage-2000, a multirole combat fighter from Dassault Aviation of France, as the joint venture could economically manufacture the components designed by Thales in France, thus allowing Thales to significantly lower its bid for the Indian Air Force. Samtel is also responsible for the maintenance, repair, up gradation, and obsolescence management of this equipment. The joint venture also aims to build advanced systems, including Helmet Mounted Sight Display, intended for use by the Indian Navy.

In 2016, Samtel-HAL JV completed the installation of 1,000 multi-functional displays in Sukhoi Su-30, India’s indigenous fighter aircraft.

On 1 September 2026, Samtel HAL Display Systems Limited opened its new production plant in Phase IV, Udyog Vihar, Gurgaon. It will support the design, development, manufacturing, and product support of display systems for both ground and airborne applications by housing testing and quality assurance capabilities. The business is the first defense avionics public-private partnership in India to design, qualify, and produce a multi-function display for the Sukhoi Su-30MKI domestically.

== Awards and recognitions ==
- 2010: Samtel won the EMPI-Indian Express Innovation Award, for its innovative approach towards the indigenisation of high-technology display products.
- 2012: Puneet Kaura, the Managing Director and CEO of Samtel Avionics, has received among the ’40 Under 40’ of Aviation Week & Space Technology, as a rising star in the global aerospace & defence industry.

== See also ==
- Rafale Deal
- Defence industry of India
- Samtel Group
