= Exide Life Insurance =

Indian life insurance company

- Formerly: ING Vysya Life Insurance Company
- Type: Private company
- Industry: Life Insurance Services
- Founded: 2001
- Fate: Merged into HDFC Life
- Headquarters: Bangalore, India
- Area served: India
- Key people: Sanjay Vij (Executive Director and Principal Officer); Rangarajan BN (Appointed Actuary and CRO); B. Ashwin (COO)
- Products: Life insurance
- Parent: HDFC Life

Exide Life Insurance Company Limited was an Indian life insurance company. Exide Life Insurance distributed its products through multiple channels, including an agency channel with over 40,000 advisors and more than 200 company offices across the country. The company had over 1.5 million customers and managed assets exceeding INR 18,000 crores (INR 180 billion). Established in 2001 and headquartered in Bangalore, the company provided long-term protection and savings options. Exide Life merged with HDFC Life in late 2022.

== History ==
In 2000, ING Insurance, a subsidiary of the Dutch financial group ING Group, partnered with Bangalore-based Vysya Bank to enter the Indian life insurance market, forming ING Vysya Life Insurance Company. The same year, ING Vysya Bank, ING Insurance, and the Damani Group established a life insurance joint venture, marking the first bancassurance venture in India.

In 2005, Exide Industries acquired a 50% stake in ING Vysya Life Insurance. The company distributed its products through various channels, including Agency, Bancassurance, Corporate Agency & Broking, Direct Channel, and Online.

After the 2008 financial crisis, ING entered a global restructuring strategy and decided to exit the insurance business in India. Prior to its exit from India, ING had also exited insurance ventures in Malaysia, Thailand, and Hong Kong.

=== Exide Life Insurance ===
After ING's exit from India in January 2013, Exide Industries acquired the remaining 50% stake in ING Vysya Life Insurance, becoming the sole owner. In May 2014, following approvals from the Insurance Regulatory and Development Authority (IRDA) and the Ministry of Corporate Affairs, the company was renamed Exide Life Insurance Company Limited (Exide Life Insurance). The company had a presence in over 200 cities across India and planned to expand operations to additional centres, including major cities such as Kolkata, Asansol, Jorhat, and states like Bihar and Odisha.
