= Indegene =

Indian multinational company

Indegene Limited
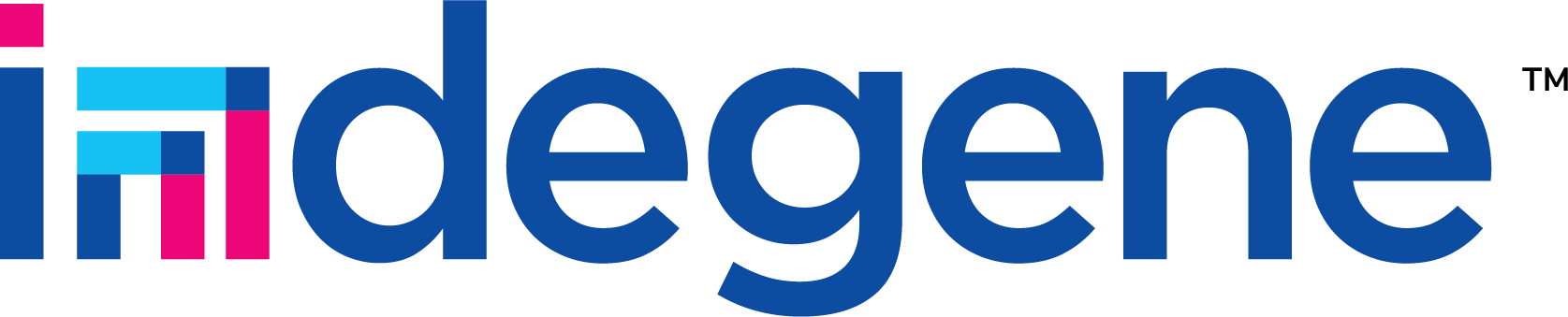
- Formerly: Indegene Lifesystems Private Limited (1998–2016); Indegene Private Limited (2016–2022)
- Company type: Public
- Traded as: NSE: INDGN; BSE: 544172
- Industry: Pharmaceutical consultancy
- Founded: 1998; 28 years ago
- Founders: Rajesh Nair; Manish Gupta; Sanjay Parikh; Anand Kiran; Gaurav Kapoor
- Headquarters: Bangalore, India
- Area served: Worldwide
- Key people: Manish Gupta (CEO)
- Revenue: ▲₹2,589 crore (US$270 million) (FY24)
- Operating income: ▲₹584 crore (US$61 million) (FY24)
- Net income: ▲₹336 crore (US$35 million) (FY24)
- Owners: N. S. Raghavan (24.4%); Carlyle Group (10.22%); Brighton Park Capital (9.55%)
- Number of employees: 5,081 (March 2024)
- Website: www.indegene.com

Indegene Limited is an Indian company that provides research and commercialization services to biopharmaceutical and healthcare enterprises. Based in Bangalore, the company provides consulting in pharmaceutical marketing, clinical trials, pharmacovigilance, medical and regulatory affairs, and health informatics.

== History ==
Indegene was founded in 1998 by Dr. Rajesh Nair, Manish Gupta, Gaurav Kapoor, Dr.Sanjay Parikh and Anand Kiran. Indegene's first acquisition was Medsn, a company that provided medical education. Medsn continued to operate under the same name in the United States. In 2008, Medsn officially became Indegene Pharmaceutical Solutions in the United States. In 2006, Indegene acquired MedCases, a continuing medical education company based in the United States.

In 2009, Indegene signed a master service agreement with six pharmaceutical companies. The following year, Indegene acquired Canada-based Aptilon, a multichannel marketing firm, for $4 million. The company subsequently acquired Atlanta-based Total Therapeutic Management in 2014.

In September 2019, Indegene acquired London-based consulting company, DT Associates, for $10 million.

In February 2021, the Carlyle Group and Brighton Park Capital invested $200 million in Indegene. In August 2021, Indegene acquired Medical Marketing Economics (MME), an American market access and pricing strategy company, for $10 million.

Indegene went public in May 2024 with an initial public offering, raising ₹1,842 crore (US$190 million). It listed on the BSE and the NSE.

== Operations ==
Indegene has offices in India, the United States, the European Union, and Asia-Pacific.

In 2011 and 2012, The Economic Times named Indegene one of the best companies to work for in the Professional Services industry.
