= Vinod Intelligent Cookware =

- Founder: Rajeram Agarwal
- Website: www.vinodcookware.com

Vinod Intelligent Cookware is an Indian manufacturer of cookware.

It was Anil Agarwal, son of Rajeram Agarwal, who collaborated with Saphymo Steel of France to introduce "Copper Sandwich Bottom Cookware", which is a multi-layered bottom and also a good conductor of heat. For this, Mr Agarwal built a manufacturing unit "Kraftwares (I) Ltd" at Palghar, Mumbai and took a step by setting up a factory in Bhandup, Mumbai, which was manufacturing stainless steel products for the local market. These products are now in the national market as "Vinod Bowl" or "Vinod Entry Dish".

As a modestly priced product, Vinod cookware is accessible to many Indian households. The range of cookware supports cooking a broad spectrum of Indian cuisine.

== History ==
=== Timeline ===
- 2015 - Mandira Bedi becomes brand ambassador
- 2014 - Vinod Group became the largest exporter of stainless
- 2013 - Sakshi Tanwar as its Brand Ambassador
- 2006 - Set up another factory in Palghar
- 2000 - manufacturing base was set up in Palghar
- 1992 - Vinod Cookware went global as Kraftwares began to export
- 1990 - Vinod launched Aluminum Sandwich Bottom Cookware
- 1987 - Collaborated with Saphymo Steel
- 1977 - Factory opened in Bhandup
- 1962 - The company founded as a cookware trading company

== Products ==
Product Category:

- Pressure cooker
- Pressure PAN
- Zest non-stick
- Hard anodized
- Triply
- Stainless steel
- Kraft appliances
