= Vicco Group =

Indian Ayurvedic company

- Formerly: Vishnu Industrial Chemical Company
- Company type: Private
- Industry: Conglomerate
- Founded: 1952; 74 years ago
- Founder: Keshav Vishnu Pendharkar
- Headquarters: Mumbai, Maharashtra, India
- Key people: Pendharkar Family (Directors)
- Revenue: ₹500 crores (2020)
- Subsidiaries: Vicco Laboratories
- Website: viccolabs.com

Vicco Group (formerly known as Vishnu Industrial Chemical Company) is a manufacturer of Indian Ayurvedic herbal hygiene, healthcare and other products like herbal tooth pastes, herbal tooth powders, natural turmeric and sandalwood oil based skin cream, herbal shaving creams and a natural ayurvedic pain relief cream Vicco Narayani. The company has over 40 products in its portfolio which are manufactured in its factories located in Thane, Nagpur and Goa and exported to 45 countries.

== History ==
It was founded by Keshav Vishnu Pendharkar in 1952, in a small godown in the industrial belt of Parel, in Mumbai. Its first product was a tooth cleaning powder which was developed after studying ancient Ayurvedic texts. Initially, Keshav Pendharkar and his sons would go door-to door to sell the product. In 1971, the company expanded into the skincare segment and came out with a turmeric-based skin cream called Vicco turmeric Ayurvedic cream.

== Awards and recognition ==
Vicco was ranked 28th among India's most trusted brands according to the Brand Trust Report 2012, a study conducted by Trust Research Advisory. In the Brand Trust Report 2013, Vicco was ranked 18th among India's most trusted brands and subsequently, according to the Brand Trust Report 2014, Vicco was ranked 17th among India's most trusted brands.
