= Apar Industries =

Indian multinational conglomerate

Apar Industries Limited
- Company type: Private
- ISIN: INE372A01015
- Industry: Electrical conductors, wires and cables, oils and lubricants, polymers
- Founded: 1958; 68 years ago
- Founder: Dharmsinh Desai
- Area served: 140+ countries
- Key people: Dharmsinh Desai (ex-chairman); Kushal Desai (chairman and managing director); Chaitanya Desai (managing director)
- Website: apar.com

APAR Industries Limited (BSE: 532259, NSE: APARINDS) is an Indian industrial company headquartered in Mumbai, India. Founded in 1958 by Dharamsinh D. Desai, the company operates across industries including electrical conductors, cables, transformer oils, lubricants, telecom infrastructure, and automotive components. It has been publicly listed on the Bombay Stock Exchange and the National Stock Exchange of India since 2004.

== History ==
APAR Industries was incorporated in 1958 as Power Cables Pvt. Ltd. during India's post-independence electrification drive, initially manufacturing power transmission conductors with capital under ₹1 lakh. In 1968, the company launched its transformer oil, branded as POWEROIL, through a collaboration with U.S.-based Sunoil.

The company expanded into the electrical and telecom cables market in 2008 by acquiring Uniflex Cables. In 2007–08, Apar entered a licensing agreement with Italy's Eni S.p.A. to produce and distribute automotive and industrial lubricants under the Eni brand in India. In 2022, actor Sonu Sood was appointed brand ambassador for its cable and wire products.

== Operations ==
Its Conductor Division produces high-temperature, low-sag (HTLS) conductors and supplies conductors for railway electrification, including projects in India. The division has also developed and installed optical ground wire (OPGW) for telecommunications. As of 2024, the company reported having supplied conductors for over 35,000 kilometers of line globally and OPGW for over 10,000 route kilometers.

The company's Transformer Oil business began production in 1968, making it one of the earliest producers in India. The division manufactures a range of products, including white oils and petroleum jelly, under the POWEROIL brand. According to company statements, it holds a significant share of the domestic market for transformer oils and has production facilities in India and the United Arab Emirates.

APAR's Cables Division was established following the acquisition of Uniflex Cables in 2008. It operates plants in Gujarat that produce high-tension and rubber cables. A portion of its production is exported to markets in the Middle East and Africa. In 2023, the division was recognized with an award at the India Wind Energy Leadership Awards.

Other divisions include a Telecom Division, which focuses on connectivity infrastructure for networks and data centers, and ARKOS, a Singapore-based subsidiary launched in 2018 that manufactures batteries and tires for electric vehicles.

== CSR ==
=== Healthcare ===
- Dharmsinh Desai Methodist Memorial Hospital (DDMM)
- Mobile Medical Unit (MMU)

=== Education ===
- Dharmsinh Desai University (DDU)
- Dr. N. D. Desai Faculty of Medical Science and Research
- Govardhan Skill Center (GSC)
- Sister Nivedita School on Wheels

=== Gender Equality ===
- Adruta Children Home
