= Sastra Robotics =

Indian Robotics company

Sastra Robotics (SGBI - Sastra Global Business Innovation) is a multinational robotics & AI company based out of Kochi that makes AI test automation solution for different industries. Established in 2013, as Sastra Robotics in Kochi India. The company expanded globally in 2021, setting up headquarters in Sunnyvale, California, with subsidiaries in the United Kingdom and India.

== History ==
SGBI was founded as Sastra Robotics in 2013 at the Kochi Startup Village by Aronin Ponnappan, Achu Wilson, and Akhil Asokan. Kamath Raveendranath, CFO of Next Education India and Amitava Roy, former COO of Tech Mahindra are some of its investors and advisors. In 2017, the company received the TiE50 Award from TiE Silicon Valley for innovations in robotics. It was selected for The Indus Entrepreneurs' AnthahPrerana accelerator program and the International Institute of Information Technology, Hyderabad's accelerator program, Avishkar. In 2019, Sastra Robotics signed a memorandum of understanding (MoU) with Lockheed Martin for avionics testing solutions and received the COSIDICI National Award for technological innovation. In 2021, it was listed under the Indian Innovation Growth Program (IIGP) for its work in AI-driven robotics. In 2022, it entered a partnership with BOSCH through the DNA Accelerator Program.

In 2023, SGBI signed an agreement to export 150 robots for a public sector department in the UK. In 2024, SGBI announced an investment of $8 million in the UK to support research and development and expand its European operations.
