= Galaxy Surfactants =

Indian multinational chemical company pvt ltd

- Type: Public
- Traded as: BSE: 540935; NSE: GALAXYSURF
- Industry: Chemicals
- Founded: 1980; 46 years ago
- Headquarters: Mumbai, Maharashtra, India
- Key people: Unnathan Shekhar (Co-Founder); Abhijit Damle (CFO); K. Natarajan (CEO); Vaijanath Kulkarni (COO)
- Products: Speciality chemicals, surfactants,
- Revenue: ▲₹4,455 crore (US$480 million) (FY23)
- Net income: ▲₹380 crore (US$41 million) (FY23)
- Website: www.galaxysurfactants.com

Galaxy Surfactants Ltd. is an Indian multinational specialty chemical company based in Mumbai, Maharashtra, India. It is a manufacturer of surfactants and speciality chemicals for cleaning and personal care space, and its more than 200 products are exported to over 100 countries. Galaxy has over 1400 clients including Colgate-Palmolive, Dabur, Himalaya, L'Oréal and Unilever and more. Performance surfactants account for 60% of revenue, and specialty personal care products account for the rest.

Galaxy is considered a power player in the global surfactants market. In 2020, the annual turnover was ₹2,563 crore. According to Unnathan Shekhar, managing director of Galaxy Surfactants, two-thirds of their business comes from international customers. In 2020, the company spent nearly ₹60 crore and filed for 62 patents.

== History ==
The company was founded in 1980 by Unnathan Shekhar, Geera Ramakrishnan, Shashi Shanbhag, CR Ramakrishna, and Sudhir Patil, five friends, all aged 23, who all came from different backgrounds. They began their company as contract manufacturers for Colgate-Palmolive, producing Sodium laureth sulfate in a small lab in Ghatkopar.

In 1984, Galaxy opened its first plant at Tarapur and its second plant for sulfonation was opened in Taloja in 1998. Galaxy also started a research centre at Navi Mumbai in 1997.

In July 2009, Galaxy acquired TRI‐K Industries, a distributor and producer of specialty ingredients. This acquisition of a 30 year old New Jersey headquartered company gave the company a foothold in the United States with additional protein manufacturing facilities in New Hampshire.

In 2011, Galaxy commissioned manufacturing plants at Zaghadia in Gujarat and Suez in Egypt at the cost of ₹330 crore.

In 2012, Galaxy became a member of Roundtable on Sustainable Palm Oil, taking a step towards creating a sustainable palm oil supply chain.

In 2018, Galaxy floated their IPO and was listed on the Indian stock exchanges (BSE & NSE).

== Financials ==
It registered ₹2627.38 crores total income in the fiscal year 2022, while ₹1834.90 crores in 2021.
