= Yepme =

Former online shopping company in India

- Company type: Private
- Website type: E-commerce
- Available in: English
- Headquarters: Gurgaon, Haryana, India
- Area served: India
- Industry: Online shopping & Online Services
- Website: www.yepme.com/Yepme.com

Yepme was an online shopping company headquartered in Gurgaon, Haryana, India. It was established in April 2011. The company specialized in the online retailing of men's and women's garments and accessories. In August 2011, the company positioned itself as a fully-fledged private label fashion brand.

== History ==
Yepme.com, was launched in April 2011 by Vivek Gaur, Sandeep Sharma and Anand Jadhav. Gaur (CEO) has experience building successful online companies like Bagittoday.com and has also held senior positions in marketing and sales with HT Media Ltd, Living Media and Hindustan Unilever Ltd. Sharma, the founder/COO and CTO, is an e-commerce, technology and operations specialist having held senior positions with Accenture, Sapient, SBI Capital Markets and HCL Technologies. Jadhav (president) is a merchandising and supply chain expert and has worked with leading apparel retailers including Shoppers' Stop, Globus, Pantaloon and Reliance Trends.

According to an interview with Gaur on Bloomberg UTV, in 2010 the founders saw huge growth potential in India's online shopping market, which was then dominated by the online travel sector. Having started its operations as an online apparel retailer, in August 2011 Yepme.com decided to focus on private label fashion-wear instead of branded apparel. Seeing larger brands handing over end-of-lifecycle products to online retailers (purportedly to avoid disparity between shop and online prices) the founders decided to promote the Yepme brand as private label apparel brand.

== Funding ==
Yepme.com raised Series A investment from Helion Ventures Partners, an India-focused, early to mid-stage venture fund. In August 2012, Business Today reported that Yepme has raised 9 million in total from Helion Venture Partners and a California-based investor. In September 2015, Yepme raised $75 million from investors led by Malaysian state fund Khazanah Nasional Berhad.

== Operations ==
The main target customer for Yepme.com is tier 2 and tier 3 towns, where the big apparel brands do not have many retail stores. According to Hindu Business Line, of the 13,000 orders that Yepme.com received in July and August 2011, about 69 per cent were from about 500 tier 2 and tier 3 towns, with the rest coming from six major cities. About 35 per cent of the site orders are from places not serviced by courier companies and can only be reached through India Post.

According to Yepme's COO Sandeep Sharma; since around 70 per cent of Yepme's shipments are going to the smaller towns and the company is providing a Hindi language option on its website. Currently besides Hindi, customers at Yepme.com can also shop in Tamil, Telugu, Malayalam & Kannada.

In the October 2011 edition of Business Today, it was reported that Yepme.com attracts over 21,000 male shoppers daily, and of that, about 1,000 visitors place at least one order on the site. In August 2012, Business Today reported that around 49 per cent of Yepme's 200,000 customers so far have gone back to it a second time.

The brand is targeting a turnover of $25 million in its first year of operations and plans to scale the revenues to over $500 million in the following 3–4 years.

As of March 2018 Yepme.com has fired 90 percent of its staff and the company is looking to windup its business and file for bankruptcy. As reported by many ex-employees and vendors their dues are still pending and company is least interested in paying them. A group of ex-employees stated they even reached the labour court and the company provided cheques, which bounced later.

== Marketing ==
In April 2012, Yepme awarded the advertising and creative duties of the brand Yepme.com, to Lowe Lintas & Partners. Following a further multi-agency pitch, Yepme gave its media planning and buying duties to Lintas Media Group. Yepme plans to spend Rs 30-35 crore annually on media and, according to Gaur, plans to advertise on general entertainment channels, movie and music channels. The print campaign will be carried out in the vernacular newspapers. The TV commercials of Yepme.com that began to be broadcast in June 2012, almost tripled its daily page views.

Yepme awarded its performance marketing duties to Tyroo Direct in July 2012. Tyroo Direct is expected to drive transactions for Yepme.com and to cater to its customers across metropolitan areas, tier 2 and tier 3 towns.

Yepme.com became the first Indian online retailer to organize a fashion show. The show was organized at The Ashok Hotel in New Delhi on 13 August 2011, with India's top male models including Dino Morea, Rajneesh Duggal, Rahul Dev and Shawar Ali.

The company gives heavy emphasis to social media marketing and has found good success, having attracted over 4.4 million fans to its fan page on Facebook.

Yepme launched its women's wear collection in the beginning of June 2012 during its fashion show in New Delhi. Kangana Ranaut, the style ambassador for Yepme, launched the collection categorised into office formals, smart casuals, party wear and fusion ranges.

In December 2012, Yepme.com was covered by Forbes, India magazine as one of the top five start-ups to watch out for.

Starcount.com ranked yepme.com on No.14 among online retail brands globally.

April 2014, Farhan Akhtar becomes Brand Ambassador for Yepme.com. He will be featured in a Music Video, to be released soon. This will be used to market the brand across all Internet and broadcast media platforms.

In June 2014, Sonu Sood has been roped in as the brand ambassador for leading online shopping portal Yepme.com. Sonu will be endorsing 'Activewear'- Yepme's sportswear line that includes the latest in men's fashion such as Crew neck tees, Polos, Muscle tees, workout Vests, Tracksuits and Sports shoes.

In June 2014, Bollywood actress Esha Gupta endorsed Yepme's women's wear line in a new television commercial featuring Yepme's latest Spring-Summer Collection 2014. Yepme's association with Farhan Akhtar and Esha gupta has contributed in increasing their followers on Facebook to 6 million, which is the highest for an e-commerce website in India.

In November 2014, Yepme is planning to expand and take its home-grown brand global. Yepme entered the US market earlier this year with the launch of Yepmeworld.com and is also selling its products on Amazon in the US

December 2014, the company signed Bollywood actor Shah Rukh Khan as their new brand ambassador. Yepme has introduced Shah Rukh Khan as its brand ambassador, through a newly launched television ad highlighting #freshfashion as a tagline for its Autumn-Winter collection’14.

== See also ==
- Ecommerce in India
- Private label
- Online shopping
