= Milky Mist Dairy =

Indian dairy company

Milky Mist Dairy Food Limited
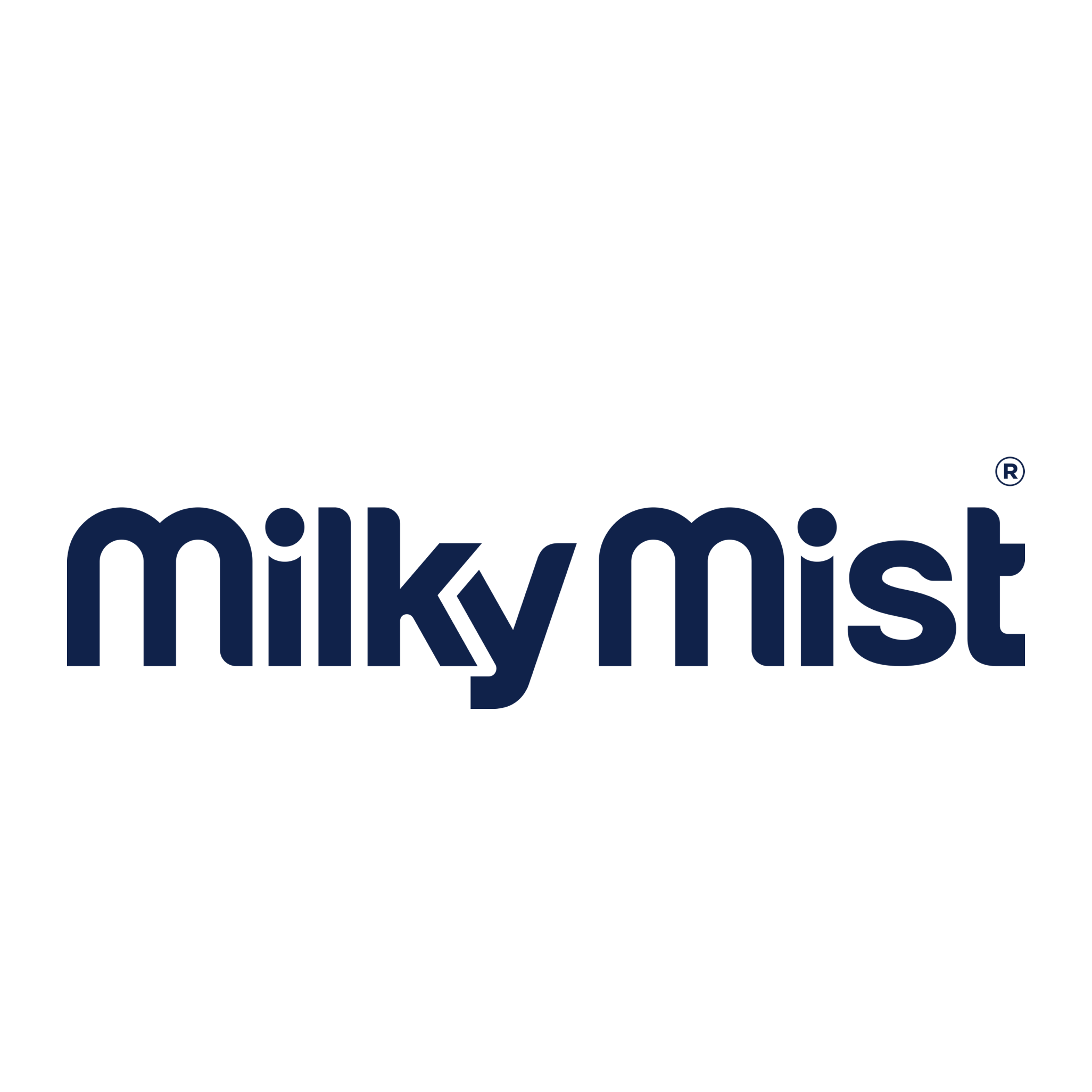
- Logo used from 2023
- Company type: Public
- Industry: Dairy
- Founded: 2008
- Founder: T. Sathish Kumar
- Headquarters: Erode, Tamil Nadu, India
- Key people: T. Sathish Kumar (CMD); K Rathnam (CEO)
- Revenue: ▲₹1,940 crore (US$200 million) (2024)
- Subsidiaries: Smart Chef; Briyas; Asal Foods; Capella
- Website: www.milkymist.com
- Footnotes / references Financials as of 31 March 2024.

Milky Mist Dairy Food Limited (MMD) is an Indian manufacturer of dairy products, based in Perundurai, Tamil Nadu. Formed in 1997 by T. Sathish Kumar, Milky Mist is engaged in milk procurement, processing, and manufacturing of other dairy products. Milky Mist's products include frozen food, dairy, desserts, food enhancers and yogurts.

== History ==
Milky Mist was founded in 1985 initially as a milk trading company. In 1994, Milky Mist began producing paneer and subsequently other dairy items including curd, butter, cheese, yogurt and ice cream.

Milky Mist's initial plant was set up in a 2 acres of land in Chithode, Erode district. In 2019–20, Milky Mist shifted its manufacturing facility from the old plant to a new plant spread over 55 acres (22 ha) with a processing capacity of one million litres (220,000 imp gal; 260,000 US gal) per day (MLPD). It manufactures dairy products like curd, yogurt, mozzarella cheese, and paneer.

In 2022, the company launched its D2C e-commerce website and mobile app.

The company has been setting up India's largest single-location cheese making unit in Perundurai in the Erode district, about 430 km west of Chennai, with an investment of ₹450 crore.

== Products ==
MMD's products include Curd (Indian Yoghurt), Fresh Paneer, Mozzarella Cheese, Cheddar Cheese, Processed Cheese, Gouda cheese, Fresh and UHT Cream, UHT Milk, Butter, Ghee, Khova, Yoghurts, traditional milk-based products like Shrikhand, Payasam (Kheer), Mishti Doi, Spray dried products such as Dairy Whitener, Skimmed Milk Powder, and Whey Powder. Also, they have launched new products such as Probiotic Curd, Frozen Pizza, UHT Lassi.

== Operations ==
MMD operates the largest fully-automated mozzarella plant in the country which comprises a robotic line production facility for paneer.

MMD procures 8 lakh litres per day of milk directly from 70,000+ farmers spread over 20 districts of Tamil Nadu and 1 district in Karnataka.
