= Manjushree Technopack =

Alternicq Limited
- Formerly: Manjushree Technopack Limited
- Type: Unlisted public company
- Industry: Packaging
- Founded: 1983
- Number of locations: 29 manufacturing facilities
- Area served: India
- Key people: Thimmaiah Napanda (Managing Director and CEO)
- Products: Plastic bottles, containers, preforms, caps and closures, pumps and dispensers, pharmaceutical packaging
- Parent: PAG
- Website: www.alternicq.com

Alternicq Limited (formerly Manjushree Technopack Limited) is an Indian packaging company headquartered in Bengaluru, Karnataka. The company manufactures rigid plastic packaging products, including bottles, containers, preforms, caps and closures, and dispensing systems, for consumer, industrial, food and pharmaceutical applications.

The company operates 29 manufacturing facilities across 16 Indian states, according to its corporate website.

== History ==
The company was established in 1983 and developed into a manufacturer of rigid plastic packaging for consumer and industrial markets.

The company expanded its presence in the Indian packaging industry through organic growth and acquisitions. Its acquisitions included National Plastics, Pearl Polymers' Classy Kontainers business, Hitesh Plastics, Oriental Containers and Pravesha Industries, according to its corporate history.

In October 2018, private equity firm Advent International acquired a majority stake in Manjushree Technopack from its existing investors, including Kedaara Capital and the promoters.

In January 2025, PAG announced an investment in Manjushree Technopack, marking a change in ownership from Advent International. The Competition Commission of India subsequently approved the proposed acquisition structure involving PAG and related investment transactions.

In 2026, the company introduced Alternicq as its new corporate identity, marking its transition from the Manjushree Technopack name.

== Operations ==
Alternicq manufactures rigid plastic packaging products for industries including beverages, beauty and personal care, home care, food and nutrition, dairy, alcoholic beverages, pharmaceuticals, paints, agrochemicals and other industrial applications.

Its product portfolio includes polyethylene terephthalate (PET) preforms, bottles and containers, caps and closures, pails, pumps and dispensing systems, and pharmaceutical packaging. The company uses several manufacturing processes, including injection stretch blow moulding, injection moulding, extrusion blow moulding and injection blow moulding.

The company's corporate website lists 29 manufacturing facilities across 16 states in India.
