= Axis Max Life Insurance =

Indian Life insurance Company Private Limited

- Type: Joint venture
- Industry: Financial services
- Founded: 2001; 25 years ago
- Headquarters: New Delhi, India
- Key people: Sumit Madan (Managing Director & Chief Executive Officer); Amrit Singh (Director and Chief Financial Officer); Anurag Chauhan (General Counsel and Company Secretary)
- Products: Life insurance; Term life insurance; Unit-linked insurance plan; Endowment policy; Money-back policy; Whole life insurance; Retirement plans
- Owner: Max Financial Services (80%); Axis Bank (20%)
- Number of employees: 33,244 (March 2026)
- Website: www.axismaxlife.com

Axis Max Life Insurance Limited (formerly known as Max New York Life Insurance Company Limited and Max Life Insurance Company Limited) is an Indian life insurance company headquartered at Gurugram. It is an 80:20 joint venture between Max Financial Services and Axis Bank. The company is a subsidiary of the publicly listed Max Financial Services. It was founded in 2000 after the liberalization of the insurance sector in India and its operations began in 2001.

== History ==
Max Life Insurance started as a joint venture between Max Financial Services and Mitsui Sumitomo Insurance Group. The former owned 68% of the company while the latter owned 26%. After forming the joint venture partnership with Mitsui Sumitomo, Max Life changed its name from Max New York Life in 2012. In February 2016, Axis Bank held a 6% share in Max Life. On 13 December 2024, Max Life Insurance rebranded itself to Axis Max Life Insurance.
