= Shree Ganesh Jewellery House =

Indian jewelry company

Shree Ganesh Jewellery House (I) Ltd.
- Type: Public
- Traded as: NSE:SGJHL
- Industry: Jewellery
- Headquarters: Kolkata, India
- Key people: Mr. Nillesh Parrekh (Chairman)
- Products: Gold and Diamond Jewellery
- Revenue: ₹6,593 Crore (US$ 1.0 billion approx)(2013)
- Operating income: ₹365 Cr.
- Net income: ₹293 Cr.
- Website: www.sgjhl.com

Shree Ganesh Jewellery House (I) Ltd. (SGJHL) is a Kolkata-based jewellery company founded in 2002. The company is one of the largest manufacturers and exporters of handcrafted gold jewellery in India.

== Overview ==
The company was founded by two brothers, Nillesh Parrekh and Umesh Parekh, in 2002. It manufactures handcrafted gold jewellery from its manufacturing units in the Manikanchan (SEZ). The company has formed a joint venture with Italian firm SALP SPA for setting up a 10-tonne lightweight gold jewellery manufacturing base at Domjur West Bengal. The company enters into joint venture with Rocks Creation Limited of Bangladesh for manufacturing of Gold and Diamond Jewellery. The company markets its jewellery products under brand name Gaja. Apart from retail business the company primarily exports its products to the United Arab Emirates (UAE), Singapore and Hong Kong.

The company opened its first branded retail jewellery store at Kolkata and Ahmedabad in October 2007. The company proposed an initial public offer of 14,269,831 equity shares in 2010. In 2013 the company operated through 46 stores in 34 cities including the existing two large format stores located at Mumbai and Kolkata. It planned to open an additional 20 stores, investing ₹1000 crore.

== Controversy ==
Nilesh Parekh was arrested for alleged fraud in the diversion of 1,700 kg of primary gold.
