= Suminter India Organics =

Indian Company

- Type: Private
- Industry: Organic farming and distribution
- Genre: Organic food & Organic cotton
- Founded: 2003
- Founder: Sameer Mehra
- Headquarters: Mumbai, India
- Area served: Europe, United States
- Products: Organic food and fibers
- Number of employees: 600
- Website: www.suminterindiaorganics.com

Suminter India Organics is an Indian multinational supplier of organic products, founded in 2003. In 2016, Suminter was working with over 20,000 farmers in Gujarat, Maharashtra, Kerala, Uttarakhand, and Rajasthan, covering 110,000 acres (450 km^{2}) of land under organic cultivation.

== History ==
After completing his undergraduate studies overseas, Sameer Mehra returned to India in 1998 with the idea of organic contract farming. There was a growing global demand for organic produce and India had unique advantages that made it a natural choice for cultivating these products: tropical weather and varied landscape ensure agro-climatic diversity and a broad range of crops year-round. Due to the high costs as well as local traditions, fertilizers and pesticides have low penetration throughout much of India. With a US$23 billion global market for organic foods in 2002 alone and a huge shortage of supply, Mehra saw an opportunity to supply organic food from India.

In 2003, Mehra founded Suminter India Organics. The company focused its product lines on non-perishable goods and organic cotton largely because spices, grains, and cotton were Indian specialties, and also because they required less intensive supply-chain management as compared to fresh produce. In order to meet global demand, Suminter integrated international organic certification into its operating model to create a "farm to shelf" fully integrated supply chain.

Though this added a 2–3 year gap between sourcing farms and organic procurement, Mehra eventually persuaded small-scale farmers of the long-term value of organic farming. Working with local NGOs, Suminter ensured consistent crop yields, safe farming practices, and a constant demand for produce. Moreover, the company passed on the benefit of higher organic margins, paying farmers a 10–20% premium over conventional products.

Suminter has raised its first round of venture capital funding from Nexus India Capital in 2007.

Suminter India Organics has been part of the Endeavor (non-profit) network since 2009.

== Awards ==
- In 2009, Suminter won the Sankalp Forum's 2009 High Impact Award for Agricultural & Rural Innovation.
