= Samtel Group =

- Company type: Private
- Industry: Consumer Electronics
- Founded: 1973
- Founder: Satish Kumar Kaura
- Headquarters: Delhi, India
- Key people: Satish Kumar Kaura (Chairman & Managing Director)
- Revenue: ▲US$ 300 million (July 2008)
- Number of employees: 6000 (2008–09)
- Website: samtelgroup.com

The Samtel Group is a manufacturer of displays and their components for television, avionics and professional applications. The group also provides engineering services and designs and builds automated processes and special purpose machines. It employs over 6000 people in nine factories and has a turnover of Rs. 12 billion per annum. Its display technology portfolio includes cathode ray tubes for TV and LCD for avionics displays. It developed plasma displays for TV but declined to pursue it commercially. It does not plan to pursue LCD for TV or other commercial applications.

Samtel has registered many patents for developments in display technology and also developed its own technology for automation.

Samtel also developed its own equipment development group which provides all its plants and many external customers with indigenously developed material handling equipment, special-purpose machines and Indian-sourced mechanical components.

The group formed Samtel Engineering Services, which provides mechanical design and engineering services to overseas customers.

In 2008, Samtel HAL Display Systems (SHDS), a joint venture between Samtel Display Systems and HAL won a contract to develop and manufacture multi-function avionics displays for the Su-30MKI. A helmet-mounted sight and display system – Topsight-I, based on technology from Thales – will be developed by STA, a joint venture with Thales, and will be integrated on the Su-30MKI in the next upgrade.
