= Engineering Exports Promotion Council =

Incentives

Logo of the Engineering Exports Promotion Council

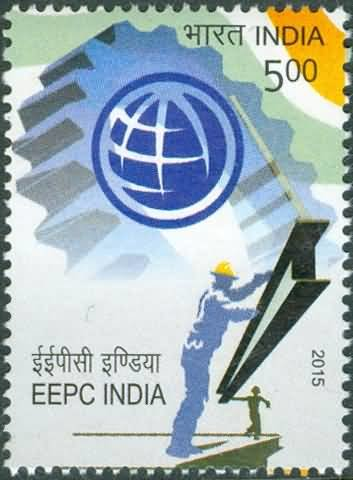
Stamp of India 2015 Engineering Exports Promotion Council

EEPC India is the trade and investment promotion organization for the engineering sector that sponsored by the Ministry of Commerce & Industry. Set up in 1955, EEPC India now has a membership base of over 12,000 out of whom 60% are SMEs.

As an advisory body it actively contributes to the policies of the Government of India and acts as an interface between the engineering industry and the Government.

EEPC India organizes promotional activities such as buyer-seller meets (BSM) – both in India and abroad, overseas trade fairs/exhibitions, and India pavilion/information booths in selected overseas exhibitions. EEPC sponsors the India Engineering Exhibition (INDEE).

EEPC India facilitates sourcing from India and boosts the SMEs to raise their standard at par with the international best practices. It also encourages the SMEs to integrate their business to the global value chain.

EEPC India organizes India Engineering Sourcing Show (IESS), This is recognized as the only sourcing event in India – showcasing technology and providing a meeting place for global buyers and sellers.

EEPC India publishes several reports/studies on the international trends and opportunities.

EEPC India aims to raise $900 billion with the implementation of New Foreign Trade Policy (2015–2020).

EEPC India started a monthly magazine named "ie2" on 10 November 2006 by Shri Nirupam Sen, Minister of Industries, Government of West Bengal. It covers current trends of the global economy, international trade and the Indian Economy. It also has Success Stories from exporters.

The association has signed an MoU with state-owned Punjab National Bank for loans, and advisory supports to its members.

EEPC in India has opened two technology centres in Bangalore and Calcutta and conducts regular programmes on technology developments and modules.
