= Analjit Singh =

Indian businessman

- Born: 11 January 1954 (age 72); New Delhi
- Education: The Doon School; Shri Ram College of Commerce; Delhi University; Boston University
- Occupations: Founder, Max Group; Founder, Leeu Collection; Non-Executive Chairman Vodafone India (till 2018)
- Children: 3
- Parent: Bhai Mohan Singh
- Awards: Padma Bhushan (2011); Knight Commander of the Order of Queen Isabella (2014)

Analjit Singh (born 11 January 1954) is an Indian entrepreneur and businessman who is founder and chairman of Max Group, a conglomerate with interests in life insurance, healthcare, and real estate. He is also the founder of Leeu Collection, an international collection of boutique hotels. He was also the Non-Executive Chairman of Vodafone India.

== Early life and education ==
Analjit Singh was born in New Delhi, the son of Bhai Mohan Singh and Avtar Kaur. His father was the founder of Ranbaxy Laboratories. Singh was the youngest of three sons.

Singh spent his formative years in The Doon School. He then studied economics at Shri Ram College of Commerce, University of Delhi. before going for his MBA at Boston University.

== Career ==
Singh served as the chairman of Vodafone India from February 2012 to August 2018. He has been the key spokesperson of Vodafone in India and was the main representative of the company during the Vodafone's retrospective taxation controversy with the Government of India.

Singh is founder of Leeu Collection, an international collection of boutique Hotels in South Africa, Europe and Asia.

Singh serves on the Founder Executive Board of Indian School of Business. He is the patron of Max Institute of Healthcare Management, one of the partner institutes at the ISB's Mohali campus. He served as Chairman of Mohali Campus Advisory Board of ISB.

He is on the board of Sofina SA, a Belgian holding company, headquartered in Brussels which invests in several industrial sectors.

He served on the board of Tata Global Beverages and resigned in December 2016. He had voted against the resolution moved for Cyrus Mistry's ouster as Chairman of the company. In his resignation letter he said that he lamented at the overall lack of transparency surrounding the sacking of Cyrus Mistry.

He served as the Chairman of Indian Institute of Technology (IIT)-Roorkee, from 2011 to 2014. He serves on the Prime Minister's UK-India CEO Forum, where he is the co-chair of Ease of Doing Business Committee along with Sir Martin Sorrell, CEO of WPP plc. He has also served as a member of Prime Minister's Indo-US CEO Forum. He has served as Chairman of Confederation of Indian Industry's (CII) national committee on insurance and pensions.

== Diplomatic associations ==
Singh serves as the Honorary Consul General of Republic of San Marino in India from November 2007. He also served as the co-chair of Prabodhan, a forum for facilitating engagement between prominent European and Indian.

== Honours and awards ==
- In 2011, he was awarded the Padma Bhushan, the third-highest civilian award in the country.

== Personal life ==
Singh has three children.
