= Independent senior living =

Type of housing for older adults

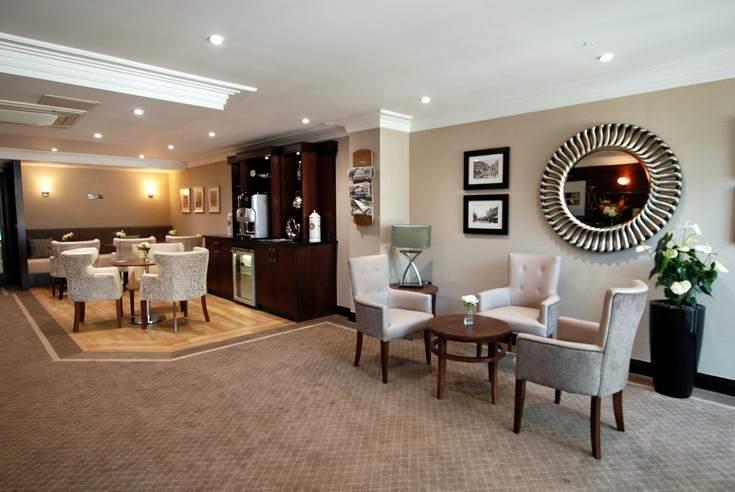
Retirement homes are common examples of independent senior living communities, such as this one in Putney, London

Independent senior living communities (also known as retirement communities, senior living communities or independent retirement communities) are housing designed for seniors 55 and older.

Independent senior living communities commonly provide apartments, but some also offer cottages, condominiums, and single-family homes. Residents include seniors who do not require assistance with daily activities or 24/7 skilled nursing, but may benefit from convenient services, senior-friendly surroundings, and increased social opportunities that independent senior living communities offer. These communities are also popular among snowbird seniors who wish to downsize or travel freely without the burden of managing a home.

Many retirement communities offer dining services, basic housekeeping and laundry services, transportation to appointments and errands, activities, social programs, and access to exercise equipment. Some also offer emergency alert systems, live-in managers, and amenities like pools, spas, clubhouses, and on-site beauty and barber salons. However independent senior living properties do not provide health care or assistance with activities of daily living (ADLs) such as medication, bathing, eating, dressing, toileting and more. Independent senior living differs from continuing care communities, which offer independent living along with multiple other levels of care, such as assisted living and skilled nursing, in one single residence.

Independent senior living residents are permitted to use third-party home health care services to meet additional needs. Some facilities combine independent living apartments with assisted living apartments. Some of these facilities have two separate wings, one for fully independent residents who may still want meal preparation, housekeeping and laundry services, as well as scheduled activities, and a separate wing for those needing additional assistance. Others have independent living and assisted living apartments mixed together. The advantage of this is that it allows the residents to intermingle, and to share activities and meals together. Some also have what is referred to as "Enhanced Living", where an in-house health care company provides some degree of living assistance for residents in an independent living wing.

The total operational resident capacity for independent senior living communities in the United States in the year ... was 245,000. Holiday Retirement is the largest single provider of independent living with a resident capacity of 25,000 at 240 retirement communities throughout the U.S. and Canada.

== Types ==
- Senior Apartments: Most common type of independent senior living. Services usually include recreational programs, transportation, and meals service.
- Housing Units: Senior communities that offer single-family homes, duplexes, mobile homes, townhouses, cottages, or condominiums. Some communities are tied to an adjoining, apartment-style independent senior living community. Residents may have the option to rent or buy.
- Continuing Care: Communities that provide access to independent living communities, as well as assisted living and skilled nursing. Residents can transfer among levels of care as needs change. Some CCRCs also provide memory care facilities.
- Subsidized Housing: The Department of Housing and Urban Development (HUD) provides communities for low-income seniors. Subsidized communities usually adhere to strict criteria and may have lengthy waiting lists.
- Naturally Occurring Retirement Community (NORC): A community that has a large population of senior residents but was not originally designed for seniors. These evolve naturally as people age-in-place over time or migrate into the same area. They are not created to meet the needs of seniors.
- Co-Care: Residents live with three other older adults in a four-bedroom, two-bathroom unit. Each unit has a small kitchen and space for laundry, living and dining, reducing costs for middle income seniors.

== Typical residents ==
A typical independent senior living community resident is a person 55 and older who is mentally and physically capable of living alone without skilled nursing or assistance with day-to-day activities. Some residents may need assistance with a few activities of daily living and can obtain third-party home health care services.

Seniors who may benefit from less home upkeep and increased access to nutritious meals, social interaction, physical and mental stimulation, and transportation make ideal independent senior living community residents.

== Compared to assisted living ==
The most significant difference between assisted living and independent senior living is the care provided. Residents of assisted living facilities require assistance with daily activities like medication, eating, bathing, dressing, and toileting. Residents of a purpose-built independent senior living complex have taken an active decision to improve their quality of life by living in a secure, low maintenance home. Elderly people who have chosen to live in an assisted retirement complex will often require more care and support to improve their quality of life. There are around 50,000 private senior living developments in the UK alone, which is insufficient to meet the demand from an increasing number of retirees. It was predicted that by 2020, 19.3% of the UK population would be aged 65 or over, and a minimum of 35,000 new senior living development properties would need to be created to meet housing demands.

Independent senior living residents are able to live on their own with limited assistance (provided by third-party home health care providers if needed) and without around-the-clock supervision. Neither assisted living nor senior independent living communities offer 24/7 skilled nursing that is provided at nursing homes.

== Cost ==
Independent senior living communities are the least expensive of the three primary senior living options. Monthly costs vary significantly by community type, size of apartment, location and services offered. The average total cost for a U.S. one bedroom independent senior living apartment is $2,750 per month.

In 2011, the average rate for a private bedroom at a U.S. nursing home was $239 per day, or nearly $7,270 per month. The average rate for a private bedroom at an assisted living community was $3,477 per month. Some continuing care communities require an entrance fee that ranges from $20,000 to $500,000, in addition to monthly fees that range from $500 to $3,000 or more depending on services; others do not require an upfront fee, but have a much higher monthly cost, and may require proof of the ability to continue to pay that cost as it increases along with the needed level of care.
