= Exide Industries =

Indian multinational battery manufacturing company pvt ltd

Exide Industries Limited
- Type: Public
- Traded as: BSE: 500086; NSE: EXIDEIND
- ISIN: INE302A01020
- Industry: Battery manufacturing
- Founded: 1947; 79 years ago
- Headquarters: Exide House, Kolkata, West Bengal, India
- Area served: Worldwide
- Key people: Sridhar Gorthi (Chairman & Independent Director); Avik Kumar Roy (MD & CEO); Manoj Kumar Agarwal (CFO)
- Revenue: ▲₹17,269 crore (US$1.8 billion) (2025–26)
- Operating income: ▲₹1,943 crore (US$200 million) (2025–26)
- Net income: ▲₹1,111 crore (US$120 million) (2025–26)
- Subsidiaries: Chloride Metals Ltd. (CML); Chloride International Ltd. (CIL); Chloride Batteries S.E. Asia Pte Ltd (CBSEA); Espex Batteries Ltd (ESPEX); Associated Battery Manufacturers (CEYLON) LTD. (ABML); Exide Energy Solutions Ltd. (EESL)
- Website: www.exideindustries.com

Exide Industries Limited (Exide) is an Indian multinational storage battery manufacturing company, headquartered in Kolkata, India. It is the largest manufacturer of lead-acid storage batteries and power storage solutions provider in India.

The company operates ten factories across five states in India, eight of which produce lead-acid batteries and two of which manufacture home UPS systems. The factories are located in Ahmednagar, Chinchwad and Taloja in Maharashtra, Haldia and Shyamnagar in West Bengal, Roorkee and Haridwar in Uttarakhand, Hosur in Tamil Nadu, Bawal in Haryana, and Prantij in Gujarat.

Exide also has manufacturing facilities in Sri Lanka, UK and Singapore and does business globally through its subsidiaries and international affiliates.

Exide exports its batteries to more than 60 countries.

The company has forayed into the manufacturing of lithium-ion cells along with modules and packs through its subsidiary, Exide Energy Solutions Limited (EESL), under which it is setting up a plant in Bengaluru, Karnataka to cater to India's EV market as well as stationary applications. EESL is setting up a 12 gigawatt-hour (GWH) green-field cell manufacturing plant in two phases of 6 GWH each. Presently, EESL is engaged in the production, assembly, and sale of lithium-ion battery modules and packs, through its operating plant based out of Prantij, Gujarat.

Exide through its wholly owned subsidiary, Chloride Metals Limited, operates 3 lead recycling facilities in the state of West Bengal, Maharashtra and Karnataka.

== History ==
In India, as in many other erstwhile colonies of Great Britain, Exide batteries were imported for many years before the Chloride Electrical Storage Company (CESCO) was finally set up in 1920. It started only as an assembling and manufacturing facility and the first manufacturing unit was set up in Shyamnagar, West Bengal in 1947. This marked the momentous entry of Associated Battery Makers Eastern Limited (ABMEL) in the Indian industrial scenario.

For road vehicles, ABMEL's principal brands were Exide and Dagenite (used by Rolls Royce) but the company was changing its course on other tracks too. Exide "Iron Clad" batteries powered the Railways and in 1963, following the Chinese aggression, the company doubled its production of special defence batteries. The same year saw the manufacture of large stationary batteries for railway track electrification.

The rapid rate of expansion was seen with the establishment of a second factory in 1969 at Chinchwad, Maharashtra to cater to the growing demand for automobile batteries and was strategically established near automobile Original Equipment Manufacturers (OEMs).

== Products ==
Exide's product range includes batteries that are used in automotive, industrial, inverter, and home UPS applications. Automotive batteries are used for SLI application across 2-wheelers, 3-wheelers, and 4-wheelers (Cars, Jeeps, Buses & Trucks) as well as for primary power sources in E-rickshaws. Its industrial usage includes segments such as power (both conventional and renewable), telecom, infrastructure projects, IT/ITES industries, railways, mining, and defence sectors. Exide is also present in the battery energy storage business where it designs and integrates power generated through renewables for use in remote areas of the country. Also, Exide supplies submarine batteries to the Indian Navy.

== Research and Development ==
The company's Research and Development Centre in Kolkata, West Bengal was established in 1976.

Also, Exide's R&D has partnerships with entities such as Moura Batteries in Brazil, Furukawa Battery in Japan, East Penn in the USA, Advance Battery Concepts in the USA, and SVOLT Energy Solutions Company Ltd in China (for Lithium-ion Cell Manufacturing).

== Recycling ==
Chloride Metals Limited (CML) is a wholly owned subsidiary of Exide Industries Limited, engaged in the recycling of lead-acid batteries. CML operates three secondary smelting and refining facilities in India. These plants recover lead and lead alloys from end-of-life batteries, which are then reused in the manufacturing of new batteries.

== Subsidiaries ==
- Chloride Metals Ltd. (CML)
- Chloride International Ltd. (CIL)
- Chloride Batteries S.E. Asia Pte Ltd (CBSEA)
- Espex Batteries Ltd (ESPEX)
- Associated Battery Manufacturers (CEYLON) LTD. (ABML)
- Exide Energy Solutions Ltd. (EESL)

== Relationship with Exide Technologies ==
Chloride Electric Storage Co. Ltd. (CESCO) was the United Kingdom–based division of the United States–based Electric Storage Battery Company (ESBC), a predecessor to today's Exide Technologies. In 1947, ESBC was forced to sell off CESCO following the decisions of a United States district court, and CESCO held the "Exide" trademark in the UK, and later sold batteries under the Exide name in India. In 1991, CESCO's successor, Chloride Group plc, fully divested its trademark in India and battery manufacturing operations to its current management. In 1997, Exide Industries filed a lawsuit against Exide Technologies of the United States when the latter tried entering the Indian market, and both companies entered a prolonged legal battle that was heard by the Delhi High Court, which led to a 2012 verdict that Exide Industries was the legal owner of the Exide trademark in India.

An appeal was filed and in 2017, it was ruled that while Exide Industries was the trademark owner in India, Exide Technologies held the goodwill of the "Exide" name and both companies had a legitimate claim to use of the name in the Indian market. A further appeal from the Indian company that went to the Supreme Court of India led to a stay of the verdict, however, there was a restraining order on the use of the "Exide" name from the American company until the final verdict. Both parties settled in 2017, with an out of court settlement from Exide Industries to Exide Technologies, terms being that Exide Technologies waives any rights to the "Exide" trademark in India in perpetuity.
