= Birla family =

Indian business family and Philanthropic arm

Birla Family
- Business family
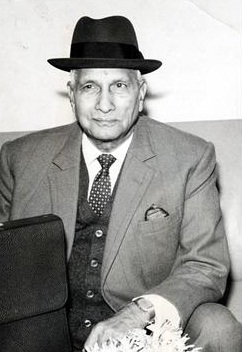
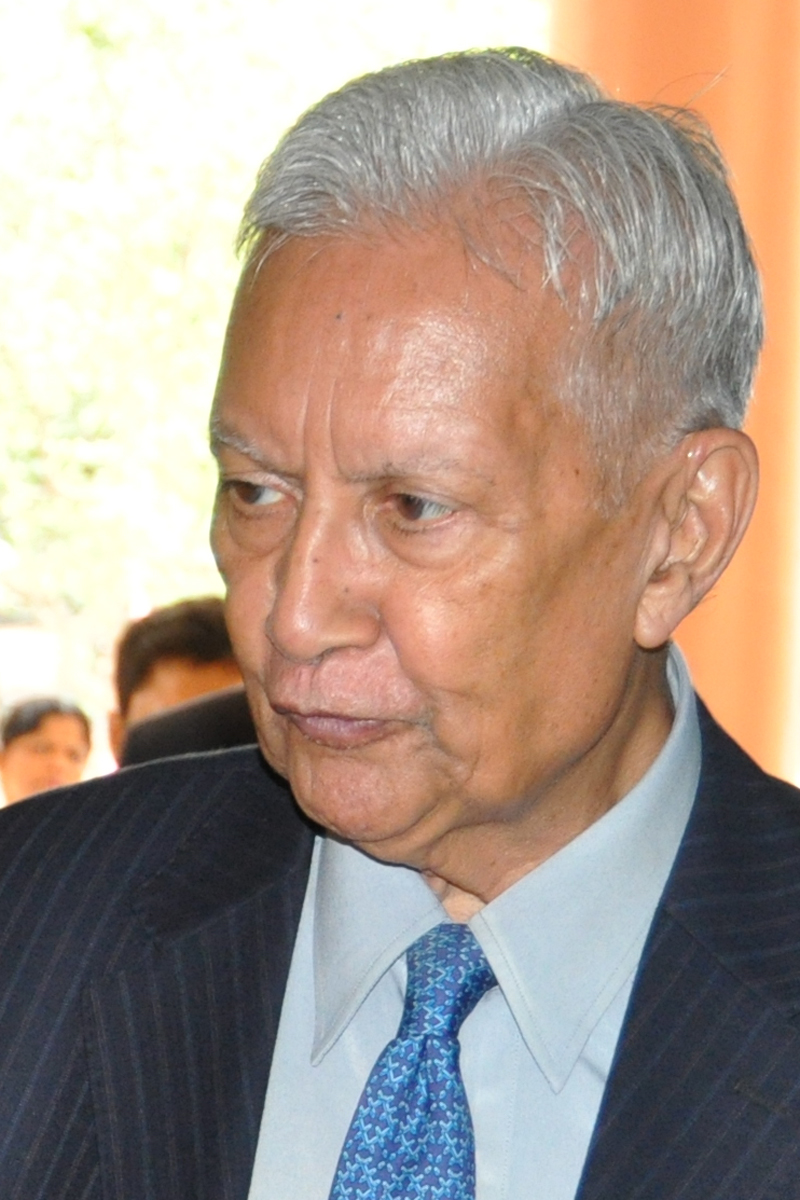
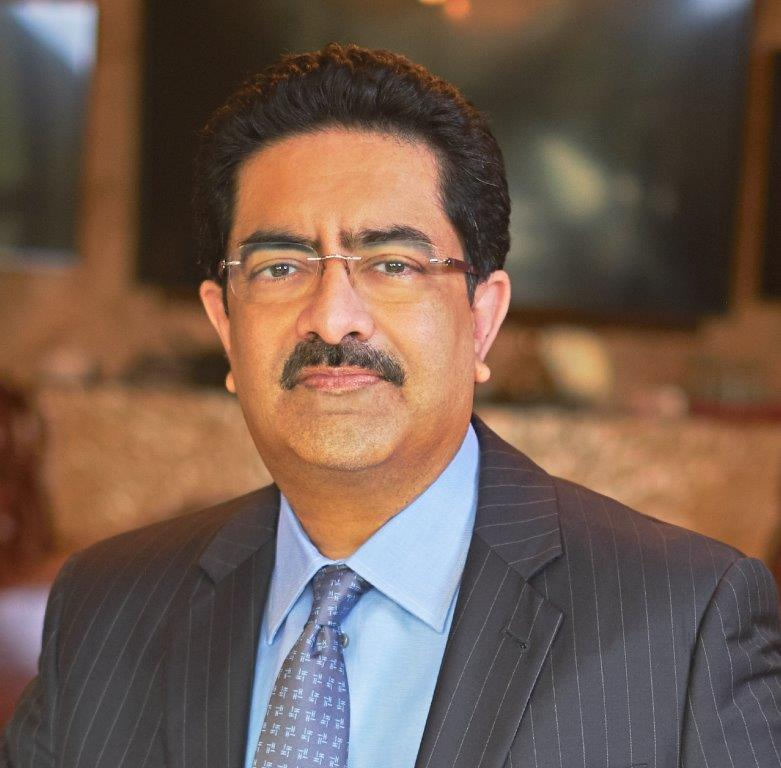
- G. D. Birla B. K. Birla K. M. Birla
- Current region: Operating out of Delhi, Mumbai and Kolkata, India
- Origin: Pilani, Jhunjhunu, Rajasthan, India
- Members: Baldeo Das Birla; Jugal Kishore Birla; Rameshwar Das Birla; Ghanshyam Das Birla; Madhav Prasad Birla; Krishna Kumar Birla; Basant Kumar Birla; Ganga Prasad Birla; Aditya Vikram Birla; Chandra Kant Birla; Kumar Mangalam Birla

The Birla family is an Indian business family connected with the industrial and social history of India.

== History ==
The Birla family's origins trace to the Maheshwari community of Bania Vaishya traders. The family was outcast in 1922 when Rameshwar Das Birla remarried a Kolvar woman. They are Marwari since by convention, merchants from Rajasthan are termed Marwari. The family originates from the town of Pilani in the Shekhawati region of North-east Rajasthan. They still maintain their ancestral residence named Birla Haweli in Pilani and run several educational institutions there, including the BITS Pilani.

=== Shiv Narayan Birla ===
In Pilani, during the early 19th century lived Seth Shobharam, grandson of Seth Bhudharmal, a local tradesman of modest means. It was his son, Seth Shiv Narayana (1840–1909), who first ventured outside Pilani. At this time, Ahmedabad served trade from a large region of northwest India. Goods (mainly cotton) would be brought from the hinterland to the city and sent from there by train to Bombay for export to England and other countries. Several cotton -inning units were also set up in Ahmedabad, to clean the cotton before shipment to England. Shiv Narayana Birla was one of the early Indian traders to participate in this cotton trade. Later, Britain traded opium with China and developed the cultivation of poppy in India. The Ratlam-Mandsaur region became prime poppy cropland due to the suitable soil and climate. Shiv Narayan Birla and his adopted son, Baldeo Das Birla, made a fortune by trading opium with China, and this formed the basis of the family's fortune. With growing wealth and increasing confidence, Shiv Narayana Birla moved up the value chain and began chartering cargo ships in partnership with other Marwadi tradesmen to trade opium with China, thus by-passing British middlemen. To facilitate this, he moved to Bombay in 1863.

=== Baldeo Das Birla ===
Shiv Narayan Birla had no children. By the early 1880s, Shiv Narayan (Narain) had passed on his business interests to his adopted son, Baldeo Das Birla, established Shivnarayan Baldeodas, a trading house based in Bombay (now Mumbai). His son, Baldeo Das Birla moved to Calcutta set up Baldeodas Jugalkishor in 1887. Baldeo Das was succeeded by four sons – Jugal Kishore, Rameshwar Das, Ghanshyam Das and Braj Mohan.

Baldeo Das was awarded the Raibahadur title in 1917. In 1920 he retired from business and started living in Banaras pursuing religious studies. In 1925 he was awarded the title of "Raja" by the government of Bihar and Orissa (now Odisha). He was also awarded D.Litt. by Banaras Hindu University.

=== Ghanshyamdas Birla ===
Ghanshyamdas Birla laid the foundation of his industrial empire by establishing GM Birla Company, trading in jute, in 1911. The First World War began in 1914 greatly increasing the demand for gunny bags. During the war, the Birla's worth is estimated to have risen from ₹2 million (equivalent to ₹580 million or US$6.2 million in 2026) to ₹8 million (equivalent to ₹1.6 billion or US$17 million in 2026). In 1919, he became among the first group of Indian entrepreneurs to become owner of a jute mill named Birla Jute. In the next years he acquired several cotton mills. He later started several sugar mills. The publication Hindustan Times was co-founded by GD Birla in 1924 and fully acquired by him in 1933. Hindustan Motors was started in 1942. After India's independence in 1947 he started Grasim (Gwalior Rayon Silk Manufacturing, 1948) and Hindalco (Hindustan Alum Company 1958) among others. He also generously led the grant on the request of Vallabhbhai Patel to lay the foundation of Birla Vishvakarma Mahavidyalaya in Anand, Gujarat.

Baldeo Das, as well as his sons, were among the key supporters of the Swaraj movement led by Mahatma Gandhi, in addition to being dedicated Hindu activists. They were active supporters of the Banaras Hindu University founded by Pt. Madan Mohan Malaviya and were also financial supporters of activities initiated by Mahatma Gandhi. The landmark Laxminarayan Temple in Delhi was built by Jugal Kishore Birla and was inaugurated by Mahatma Gandhi and as asked by Mahatma, all Hindus, including Harijans were welcomed in this temple.

In the few decades before India's independence, Indian merchants, including the Birlas, made successful attempts to enter and acquire industries in India which were once dominated by Scots from Britain. This became a part of Mahatma Gandhi's Swadeshi movement.

The Birlas remained close to some of the leaders of India, like Sardar Patel after India's independence. When E. M. S. Namboodiripad became the chief minister of Kerala (1957–59), as a result of the first elected Marxist government anywhere, the Birlas were invited to establish a pulp factory there.

In the recent past, the Birlas, as well as several other Indian industrialists, have expanded overseas.

== Family Tree ==
A simplified family tree is given below. It does not include daughters or children who are young (or who died young). Lakshmi Nivas Birla was technically adopted by his uncle Jugal Kishor Birla. As has been noted in the press, some of the branches have been more successful than others. The GD–Basant Kumar Birla branch has performed the best, with a group turnover of ₹29,000 Crore in 2004. At the other end is Yashovardhan Birla, who has struggled.

Family of Birla family
Advaitesha Birla

Shiv Narain Birla
Baldeo Das Birla
Jugal Kishore Birla	Rameshwar Das Birla	Ghanshyam Das Birla	Brij Mohan Birla
Gajanan	Madhav Prasad Birla (M.P Birla Group)	Lakshmi Niwas Birla	Krishna Kumar Birla	Basant Kumar Birla	Sarala Birla	Ganga Prasad Birla
Ashok	Sudarshan Kumar Birla (S. K. Birla group)	Shobhana Bhartia (Hindustan Times)	Aditya Vikram Birla (Aditya Birla Group)	Rajashree Birla	Chandra Kant Birla (CKA Birla Group)
Yashovardhan (Yash Birla Group)	Sidharth	Kumar Mangalam Birla
Vedant	Aryaman	Ananya Birla

== Philanthropy ==
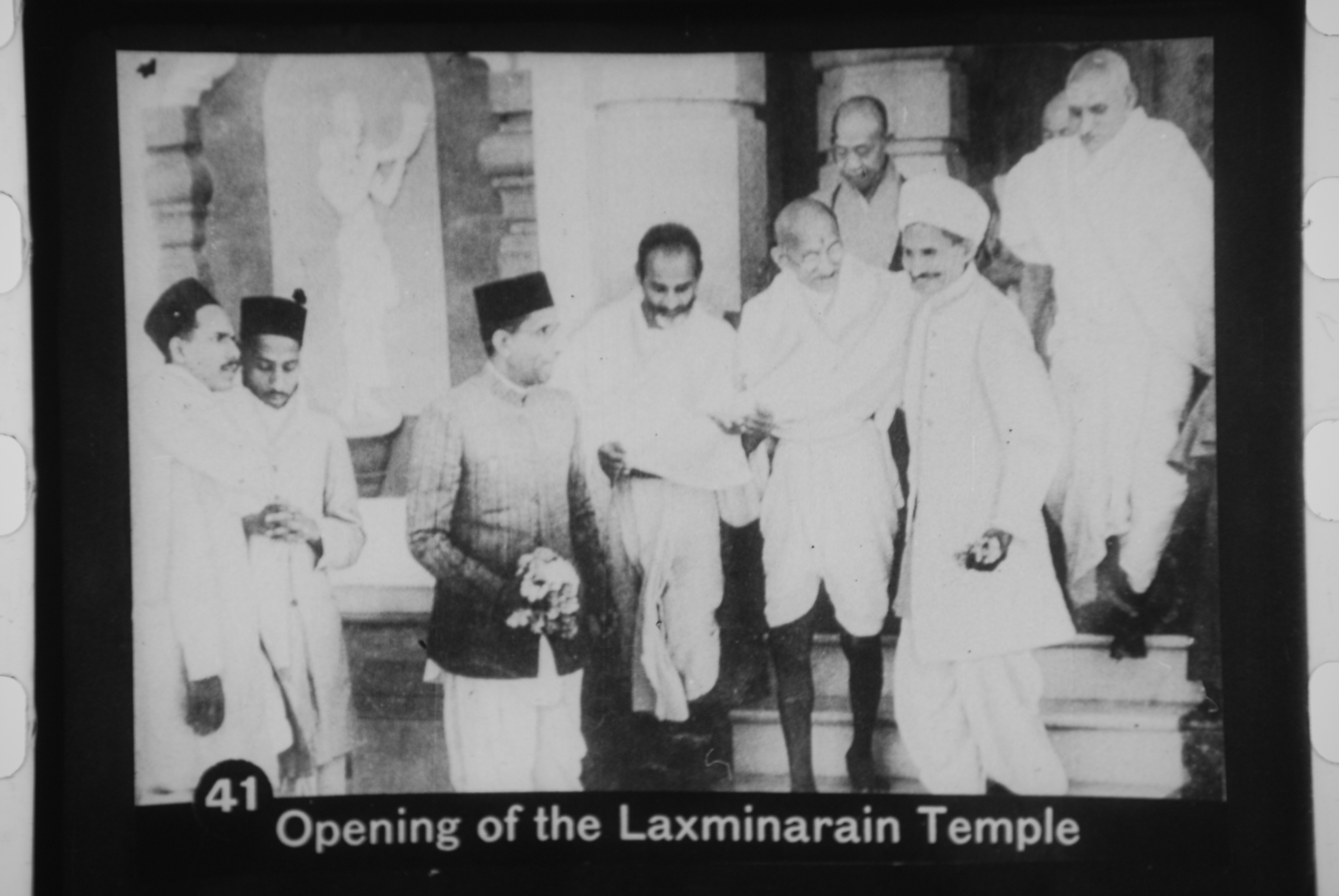
Gandhi inaugurating the Laxminarayan Temple, Delhi, 1938, with the Birla family (Jugalkishor, Rameshwardas, Ghanshyamdas in black caps, Baldeodas in turban

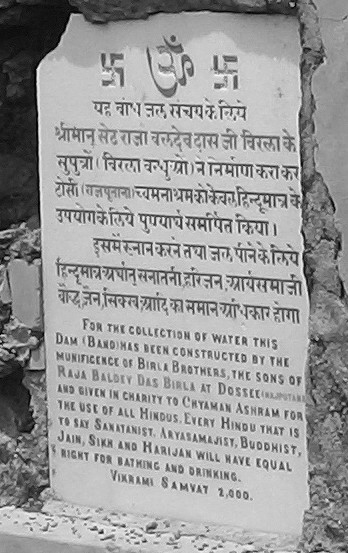
Birla Brothers' of Pilani, who established 'BITS, Pilani' also got constructed a Dam in the year 1944 or Vikrami Samvat 2000 on 'Dhosi Hill' to store rainy water for bathing of 'Pilgrims'

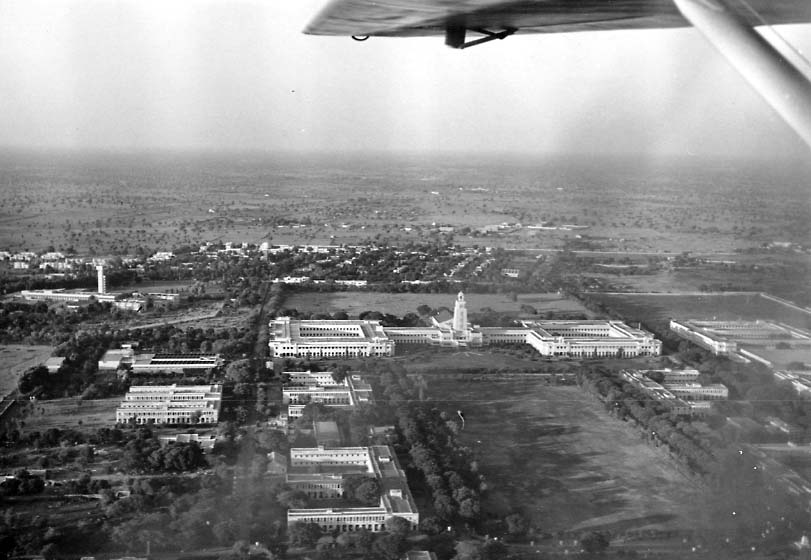
Birla Institute of Technology and Science-Pilani campus aerial view

Birla philanthropy began in the 1880s, when the Birla family donated over 1 lakh rupees for setting up goshalas in Kolkata. By early 1900, the Birla family began to support education, influenced by Pandit Madan Mohan Malaviya. They supported educational charities in Kolkata and in Mumbai teaming up with Jamnalal Bajaj. In 1918, the family established the first high school in Pilani now name as Birla School, Pilani it is one of the oldest school in India. Currently they have 6 schools run by Birla Education Trust (BET), which evolved into BITS Pilani, which has branches in Hyderabad, Goa and Dubai. They also opened a Sanskrit library in Benares and a library in Kolkata. They also helped Indian's freedom struggle and for building temples such as the Birla Temple in several major Indian cities.

The institutions founded by the Birlas include:

- Education
  - Birla High School, Kolkata
  - Rukmani Birla Modern High School, Jaipur
  - Modern High School for Girls, Kolkata
  - South Point School
  - B K Birla Centre For Education
  - M. P. Birla Foundation Higher Secondary School
  - Mahadevi Birla World Academy
  - Aditya Birla Public School, Renukoot
  - Aryaman Vikram Birla Institute of Learning, Haldwani, Uttarakhand
  - Birla Vidya Niketan Saket, Delhi.
  - Birla International Schools - The Franchisee Module
  - Birla Open Mind - High End Franchisee Module
  - Birla Institute of Technology and Science, Pilani
  - Birla Institute of Technology, Kolkata
  - Birla Institute of Management Technology (BIMTECH), Greater Noida
  - B.K. Birla Institute of Engineering & Technology
  - Birla Global University Bhubaneswar, Odisha
  - Sarala Birla University
  - Birla Institute of Technology, Mesra
  - Birla Vishvakarma Mahavidyalaya
  - Birla Education Trust, Pilani
  - Technological Institute of Textile & Sciences, Bhiwani
  - Birla Institute of Applied Sciences
- Science and Research
  - Birla Planetariums (Kolkata, Hyderabad, Chennai)
  - M. P. Birla Institute of Fundamental Research
  - Birla Institute of Scientific Research
- Healthcare
  - Bombay Hospital
  - Belle Vue Clinic, Kolkata
  - Aditya Birla Memorial Hospital
- Culture
  - Birla Mandir temples in several cities in India, including Delhi, Pilani, Bhopal, Kolkata etc.
  - Guru Hanuman Akhara (Birla Mills Vyayamshala)
  - BK Birla Group institutions
  - Aditya Birla Group Institutions
  - K. K. Birla Foundation, established in 1991 by Krishna Kumar Birla, gives the annual awards like Saraswati Samman, Vyas Samman and G. D. Birla Award for Scientific Research.

== Traditions ==
In a letter, Ghanshaym Das offered this advice to Aditya (his grandson) when he was studying at MIT:

“eat only vegetarian food, never drink alcohol or smoke, keep early hours, marry young, switch-off lights when leaving the room, cultivate regular habits, go for a walk everyday, keep in touch with the family, and above all, don’t be extravagant.”

GD Birla instructed his son Basant Kumar to 'never utilize wealth only for fun and frolic,' to 'spend the bare minimum on yourself,' and to deride 'worldly pleasures.'

This advice symbolized the ethic of the rising Marwari community, with restraint and austerity its defining attributes.

== Family ties ==
Although the Birlas are perceived as a single entity, the different branches of the family are now financially independent. However they have continued to maintain family relationships that go back to the times when "Birla Brothers" were an actual entity and Raja Baldeo Das was still alive.

GD Birla's both wives died early because of tuberculosis (He remarried after the death of his first wife). The families of his brothers Brij Mohan and Rameshwar Das Birla helped in raising his children. When Yash Birla's parents died in a plane crash, Priyamvada Birla helped take care of him.

It is reported that Kumar Mangalam Birla had dipped into his own resources to help his relative Yash with his financial issues with creditors in order to preserve the family name.

=== "Tata-Birla" word pair ===
For many decades the extreme wealth in India was associated with the Tatas and Birlas. The words Tata-Birla were often used together. They were distantly followed by Dalmias (Dalmia-Sahu Jain group) for some time, however Tatas and Birlas have been able to sustain themselves as among the most prominent industrialists in India while others have declined.

A plan for development of India was developed by a group of industrialists in 1944, which was termed the Tata-Birla plan or the Bombay Plan, which is said to have served as a blueprint for India's first five-year plan.
