= Sarala Birla =

Indian businesswoman (1923–2015)

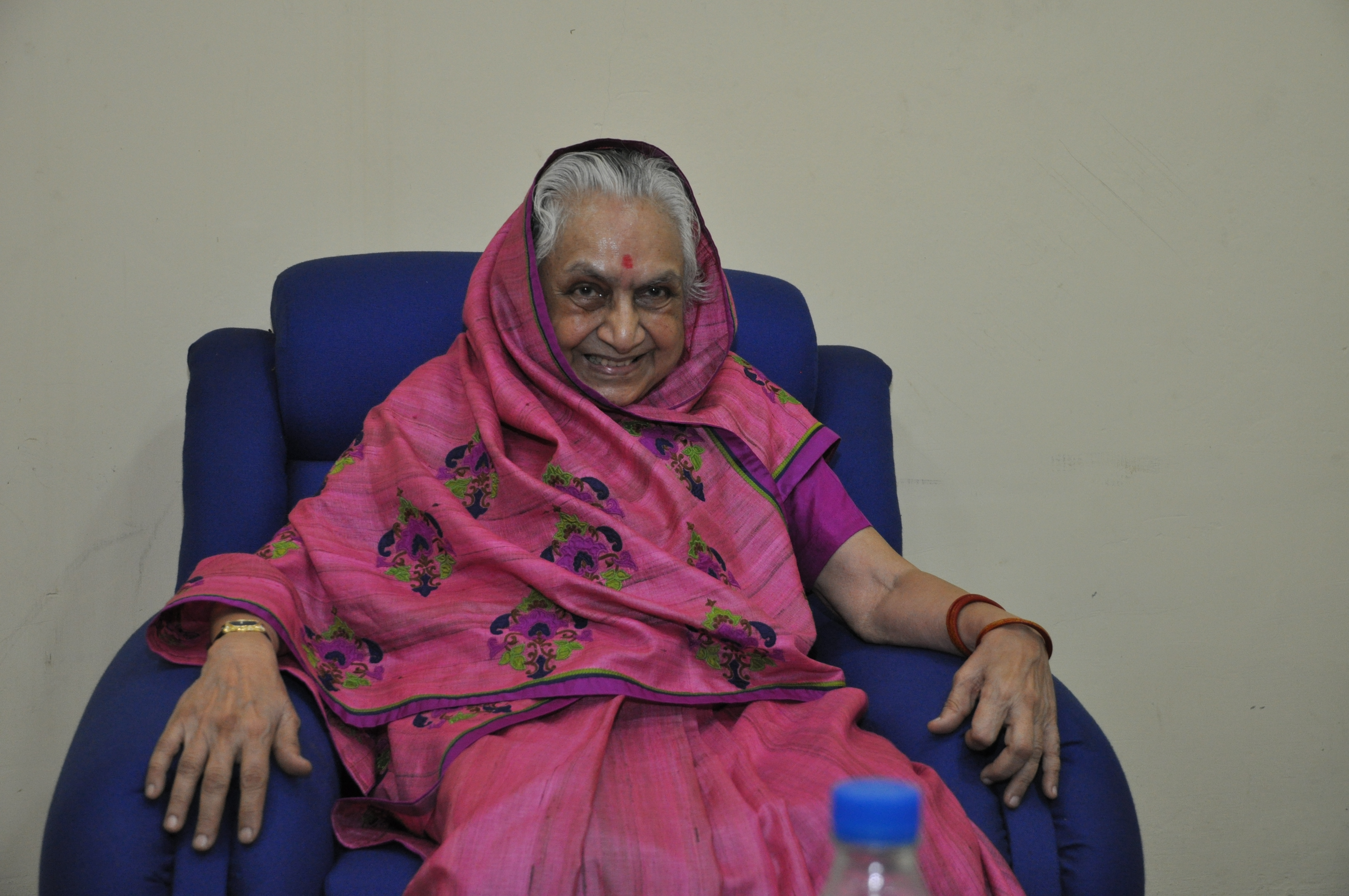
- Born: 23 November 1923; Kuchaman, Jodhpur (Marwar), Rajputana, British India
- Died: 28 March 2015 (aged 91); New Delhi, India
- Known for: Educationist
- Spouse: Basant Kumar Birla
- Children: 3 including Aditya Vikram Birla
- Father: Brajlal Biyani

Sarala Birla (23 November 1923 – 28 March 2015) was an Indian businesswoman and a prominent member of the Birla family of Indian industrialists. She took an interest in public education and, along with her husband, is credited with having co-founded about 45 educational institutions supported by her family's conglomerate.

== Biography ==
Sarala Birla was born into a traditional Marwadi Hindu family, the daughter of Gandhian educationist and Congress Party worker Brijlal Biyani and his wife Savitri Devi Biyani. She was born in Kuchaman, Rajasthan, at the residence of her maternal grandmother. Her family hailed from Rajasthan, but her father had settled in Akola, Maharashtra, and it was in Akola that Sarla grew up. She studied in a local government school, and the medium of instruction was Marathi. As a result, she grew fluent in that language, while retaining her native tongue, the Marwadi dialect of Hindi. English was taught at the school beginning from class six, and Sarla also learned the standard register of the Hindi language at this time. Sarla grew up amid a number of spoken languages, and this made it easy for her to pick up new tongues. In older age, she made decided to learn French as well.

On 28 March 2015, she was in Delhi to attend a function marking the 121st anniversary of GD Birla. She was injured in a minor accident involving her wheelchair and the lift (elevator) and died as a result of old-age related heart failure. She was 91.

== Philanthropy ==
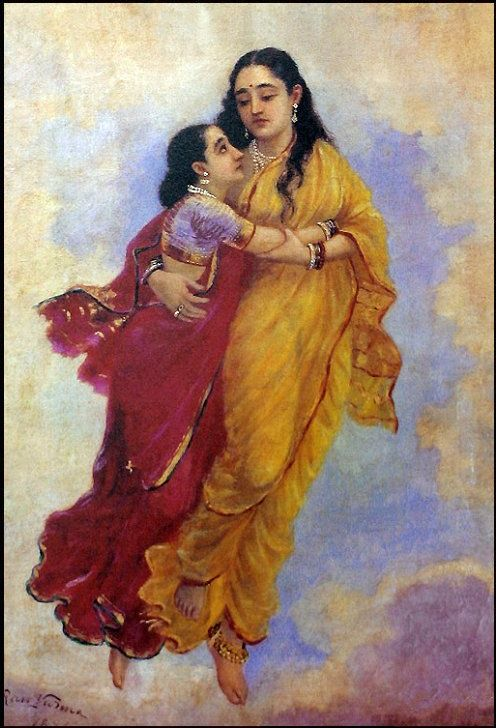
Raja Ravi Varma, Menaka and Sakunthala (1891), Birla Academy of Art and Culture in Kolkata

She had made notable contributions through her social and institutional activities and took an active part in their working. She had been associated as governor, trustee, or in another manner with the following institutions:

- Birla Institute of Technology and Science, Pilani
- BK Birla Institute of Engineering & Technology, Pilani
- BK Birla College of Arts, Science & Commerce, Kalyan
- BK Birla Public School, Kalyan
- Mahadevi Birla World Academy
- Mahadevi Birla Shishu Vihar
- Birla Academy of Art & Culture, Calcutta
- Swar Sangam, Calcutta
- Sangit Kala Mandir, Calcutta
- Sangit Kala Mandir Trust, Calcutta
- Birla Bharati, Calcutta
- Birla Vidya Niketan, Delhi, Saket

Her collection of Indian art, including that on display at the Birla Academy of Art and Culture in Kolkata, ranks amongst India's notable private collections. The Sangit Kala Mandir, besides the Birla Academy of Art and Culture, were both set up by the couple.

== Personal life ==
In April 1941, she married Basant Kumar Birla, the son of GD Birla, in an arranged marriage after having been introduced to each other by Jamnalal Bajaj and Mahatma Gandhi.

Sarala recalled:

"I was studying in Pune, Ferguson College, and I got a message that I have to go to Bombay, to Birla house, to see the boy. I went there, I was there for one night and there were so many boys there, I did not know who was who; I stayed there and I came back. After two-three months, I got a call from Gandhiji and my father-in-law telling me to come to Wardha. I went there from Pune and father (Ghanshyam Das Birla) asked me, 'you have seen Basant and you have not yet replied whether you are ready to marry him or not.' I said, 'No, there were eight-ten boys, so I didn't know who was who.' Then I said that I won't marry a boy unless I see him and I know who he is. Gandhiji said, 'she is perfectly right,' and then he said that we will arrange a meeting between you-you please come again. So I said, 'when I have my holidays, only then will I come.' Father was so nice, he said, 'alright.' So, when I had my holidays, I went, and we met on November 8."

Eventually after this marriage, Birla became the matriarch of a large family. They are sometimes referred to as the "first couple of Birla empire". They had a son, Aditya Vikram Birla, who died early in 1995.

Sarala was with her husband for 73 years. She was 91 years old, but it was a familiar sight to see her holding her husband's hand during family functions, and accompanying him to the annual general meetings of various group companies.

== See also ==
- Birla Family
