= India National PolioPlus =

Non-profit organization

India National Polio Plus Society
- Abbreviation: INPPS
- Type: Society
- Headquarters: New Delhi, India
- Key people: Deepak kapur, Chairman
- Parent organization: Rotary International

India National PolioPlus Society is a non-profit organization. The Initiative has achieved significant progress toward its goals. There has been a dramatic decline in cases everywhere in the seventeen years since the target was set in 1988.

Its volunteers throughout the world have helped organize national immunization days, staffed health stations, and given drops to children. Rotarians have helped leverage a further US$6.7 billion from the governments the-world-over for this cause.

In India, since the campaign was launched, the polio disease incidence has reduced to ‘zero' at present.

Indian Rotarians are also contributing to the program by donating large funds. During every NID /SNID, Indian Rotarians are seen volunteering by manning polio booths and administering polio drops to children.

== Projects ==
India Rotary’s India National PolioPlus society (INPPS) has actively been involved in social mobilization, media management, and political, bureaucratic and religious advocacy to make polio immunization widely acceptable; successfully gaining access to children who have never been reached before is an integral component of Rotary PolioPlus commitment.

Nearly 7000 polio-inflicted children have been operated upon and rehabilitated through 82 camps held in different endemic states of the country. Similarly, free health camps are being organized by Rotary in different districts to cater to the urgent health needs of the people including polio immunization.

In 2010, with an increasing threat of a virus outbreak in Ludhiana, Malegaon, Murshidabad, Uttar Pradesh and Bihar, Rotary Task Force Committee were formed. The state governments were supported with materials such as vaccine carriers, marker pens, cap/aprons, and cold boxes. Free general health camps in affected districts were conducted.

Rotary also makes extensive use of various IEC materials, such as comic books, video vans, banners, and posters, etc., to publicize the cause of polio eradication. Deepak Kapur, Rotary's National PolioPlus chair for India, leads a team of volunteers who advocate and support government to reach marginalized and migrant populations whose children were being missed vaccinated lea,ding to the wild poliovirus surviving in India. The mammoth effort led to 170 million children getting vaccinated against polio on every national immunization day.

== Timeline ==
1580-1350 BC: An Egyptian tablet portrays a priest with a withered leg, suggesting Polio dates back to ancient times and has been paralysing people for centuries.

1840: German doctor Jakob Heine investigates and suggests polio may be contagious.

1894: An outbreak of infantile paralysis – subsequently identified as polio – sweeps the United States.

1916: The 1916 New York City polio epidemic receives worldwide attention, accelerating research into polio.

1948: Thomas Huckle Weller and Frederick Robbins grow poliovirus in cells, for which they later receive Nobel Prize.

1952: Jonas Salk develops the first vaccine against polio – an injectable, inactivated (killed) polio vaccine.

1961: Albert Sabin develops an oral polio vaccine (OPV) using attenuated poliovirus. The OPV rapidly becomes the vaccine of choice against polio.

1972: Albert Sabin the inventor of OPV in a humanitarian gesture gives strains of Poliovirus to Rotary, who further donates these to World Health Organization to increase their availability to developing countries.

1979 : Rotary makes a 5-year pledge to immunize six million children in the Philippines against Polio.

1985: Rotary International pledges US$120 million to its fund, PolioPlus and raised US$240 million.

1986: Rotary provides US$2.6 million grant to Tamil Nadu (India) for a pilot Polio vaccination campaign.

1988: The World Health Assembly launches the Global Polio Eradication Initiative - (GPEI).

1994: The Regional Commission certifies the Americas polio-free. A pilot Polio immunization activity is conducted in Delhi targeting 1.4 million children in the age groupof 0–3 years.

1995: Govt. of India launches its first nationwide polio campaign - NID (National Immunization Day), immunizing 88 million children in the age group of 0–3 years.

1996: NIDs conducted covering children up to the age of five years.

1997: National Polio Surveillance Project, a WHO and Government of India collaboration, set up for poliovirus surveillance.

1999: Polio immunization activities intensified - house to house polio vaccination starts. Type P2 wild poliovirus eradicated from India and the World. The India Expert Advisory Group for poliwas o constituted to guide the progrme to achieve polio eradication in India.

2000: The Western Pacific Region is certified polio-free. A record 550 million children receive oral polio vaccine.

2001: UNICEF sets up Social Mobilization Network in Uttar Pradesh to mobilize cothe mmunity for accepting polio immunization.

2001-2002: Taking over from private donors, the Government of India takes the lead role in financing Polio eradication activities in the country using its own resources.

2002: Rotary International hosts the Polio Summit in India to accelerate polio eradication. Also, European Regirn is certified polio-free.

2003: Under-served strategy introduced as part of the communication strategy in India by UNICEF.

2004: The strategy to vaccinate children in transit is launched. Rotary International hosts its hugely successful Polio Summit the second time.

2005: The more effective monovalent oral polio vaccines (mOPV) were introduced in the polio programme by Govt. of India.

2006: Enumeration, vaccination, and tracking of all newborns begin in Uttar Pradesh and Bihar. Operational strengthening to improve micro-planning for revisits to households with unvaccinated children after first contact with vaccinators.

2007: Rotary's constant bridge-building efforts with the minority community help in creating Rotary's Muslim Ulema Committee in Uttar Pradesh to garner support and leadership from the community towards polio eradication.

2007: Accelerated immunization rounds, almost every month, using the more efficient mOPVs begin in Uttar Pradesh and Bihar. Tracking newborns for polio vaccination begins. Identification and immunization of migratory populations to minimize the risk of virus spread from the remaining endemic states.

2008: Efforts intensify in Bihar's high-risk blocks under the 'Kosi-river plan.'

2009: The 107 Block Plan identifies the highest-risk blocks of UP and Bihar for an intensified, focused approach addressing polio-associated risk factors by promoting routine immunization, hand washing, sanitation, diarrhea management with zinc and ORS, and exclusive breastfeeding up to six months of age. Intensive focus on coverage of migrant populations in brick kiln construction sites, urban slums, and nomadic settlements initiated.

2009: Rotary pledges to match US$200 million against Gates' Foundation's USD 355 million.

2010: The bivalent oral polio vaccine was tested and introduced by the Govt. of India. IMB (Independent Monitoring Board) was launched by WHO and the executive board to evaluate progress made by GPEI. The India Expert Advisory Group on polio eradication recommends responding to any wild poliovirus detection as a public health emergency.

2011: Last incidence of Polio reported in Howrah, West Bengal, on 13 January 2011. Aggressive mopping up of vaccination in response to the only case in the country ...

- A large-scale mop-up launched within 7 days of notification of the case and 3 mop up rounds conducted in 7 weeks from confirmation of the case. All states/UTs prepare an emergency preparedness and response plan to respond to any wild poliovirus as a public health emergency.

2012: In February, Rotary International, jointly with the Ministry of Health and Family Welfare, Govt. of India, hosts Polio Summit 2012 to renew commitment and efforts to ending polio. On 25 February, during the Summit, India is removed from the list of polio-endemic countries by WHO. May, at the Rotary International Convention in Bangkok, Thailand, it is announced that Rotary has successfully raised US$228.7 million against the Gate's Challenge grant of US$200 million. The Gates' Foundation recognizing this amazing match, makes an additional US$50 million contribution.

- In September, at the UN 67th General Assembly Session, a special session on polio is convened by United Nations Secretary-General Ban Ki-moon with leaders from the endemic countries committing to ending polio, and Rotary International commits an additional US$75 million in the next three years to polio.
- Rotary International's contribution to the global fight against polio exceeds US$1.2 billion, while by the end of 2018 it is projected to reach US$2 billion in contribution by the service organization.

2013: January, en route to regional polio-free certification in 2014, India completes two years without a case of polio.

- A six-year comprehensive plan to eliminate the polio virus by 2018 titled 'Polio Eradication Endgame & Strategic Plan 2013-2018' is launched by GPEI and is endorsed by global leaders, donors, and governments. The Vaccine Summit in Abu Dhabi results in global leaders and donors pledging US$4 billion of the US$5.5 billion budget for the six-year plan.
- Rotary International and the Gates Foundation announce a joint fundraising campaign to bridge a fund deficit of US$1.5 billion.

2013: World Polio Day on 23 October, commemorated across India by Rotary to throw light on the importance of ending polio. 'End Polio Now' on iconic buildings illuminated across popular landmarks like India Gate, Red Fort in Delhi, Taj End Land, and Kanchiguda Railway Station in Hyderabad, amongst others.

2014: India completes three years without polio on 13 January. Rotary celebrates nationwide with illumination of iconic buildings like India Gate, Red Fort, Agra Fort, and Junagarh Palace.

- On 11 February, the Govt. of India celebrates 'India's victory over polio' at a historic event graced by the President of India, the Prime Minister of India, the leader of the ruling political party, the leader of the opposition party in parliament, the health minister, and the RI President.
- In March, India is declared a polio-free country along with the SEAR-WHO region.
- Rotary International hosts a big event, 'Polio-Free Conclave 2014,' where India is joined by Southeast Asian countries in celebrating polio-free regional certification.

== Political front ==
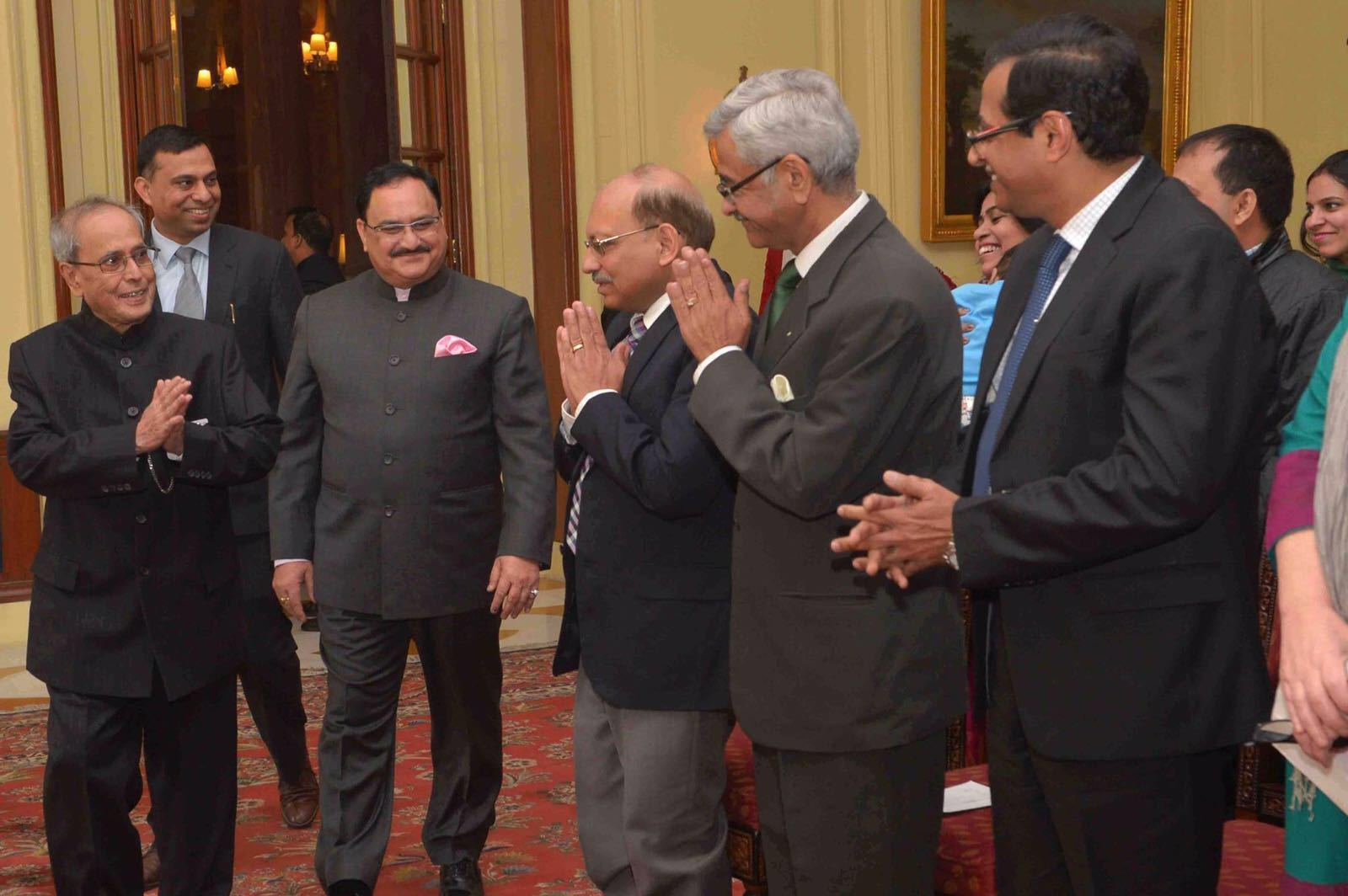

INPPS has garnered political support for the program by involving the President, the Prime Minister, chief ministers, health ministers, and local politicians in the program.

Rotary also enlisted bureaucratic support by involving the Cabinet Secretary, the Chief Secretary, the Principal Secretary, District Magistrates, and other health officials in the polio campaign.

Rotary approached senior minority leaders such as the Shahi Imam of the Jama Masjid (congregational mosque) and the President of the All India Muslim Personal Law Board and was successful in enlisting their support. Further, INPPC formed a Rotary Muslim Ulema Committee in the state of Uttar Pradesh, consisting of senior Muslim scholars and religious leaders, to address issues of resistance among the Muslim population and appeal to Muslim parents to immunize children against polio.

Today, this Ulema Committee, which Rotary helped set up in the State, is a vital resource that the U.P. Govt. and other social organizations seek intervention from time to time for their ongoing programs, aimed at bringing about an overall improvement in the social-economic life of the minority community.

== Contributions and achievements ==
Humanitarian organizations world over are partnering with Rotary International in their biggest humanitarian initiative to rid the world of polio. In a major boost to the eradication campaign, the Gates Foundation contributed a whopping US$355 million. Rotary International accepted to raise US$200 million against the Gates Foundation grant by June 2012. Rotary help raises the matching grant, exceeding the challenge.

On 13 January 2012, India surpassed one year without detecting a single case of poliovirus. On 27 March 2014, the World Health Organization (WHO) is expected to certify India as a polio-free country, marking more than three years since the last case of polio there.

India had traditionally been considered one of the toughest places in the world to eradicate polio. In 2009, India reported 741 polio cases, more than any other country in the world. In 2010, India reported just 42 cases out of 1,352 cases reported globally.

Google.org, inspired by Rotary's efforts, donated a sum of US$3.5 million to the polio eradication effort worldwide to Rotary Foundation. In India, the Aditya Birla Group, with its patron Rajashree Birla, who is an honorary member of the Rotary Club of Mumbai, has contributed US$9 million. Usha Mittal (of Arcellor Mittal Group) has donated to Rotary a total contribution of US$1.5 million towards the polio eradication fund. And Harshad Mehta, chairman of Rosy Blue Diamond, has contributed more than US$3.5 million.

In January 2014, India completed three years without a case of polio and, along with 10 SEAR countries, was awarded the Southeast Asia Regional Polio-free certification by WHO on 27 March 2014.

Rotary is supplying material to Government of India to improve upon the Rotary Immunization level.
