= Sarlanagar =

Coordinates: 24.200°N 80.809°E

Sarlanagar is an industrial town located near Maihar in the Maihar district of Madhya Pradesh, India. The town is named after Sarla Birla, the wife of B.K. Birla. The residents of Sarlanagar are primarily employees of Maihar Cement, also known as UltraTech.

Sarlanagar is divided into three sections:

1. Staff Colony, the residence of the employees of Maihar Cement.
2. Workers Colony, also known as Hanthikund Colony or Bank Colony, which has a branch of UCO Bank.
3. Mines Colony, home to the employees of the Mines Division.

The school has two branches, divided into Hindi Medium and English Medium. Sarla Higher Secondary School is a co-educational school in Madhya Pradesh, affiliated with the CBSE Board, AJMER.
