= Devroad =

Indian village

Coordinates: 28.308°N 75.630°E

Devrod is a village in the Jhunjhunu district of Rajasthan, 7 km (4.3 mi) from Pilani.
