= Vikram Punia =

Russian businessman (born 1973)

- Born: Vikram Singh Punia; 15 March 1973 (age 53); Jaipur, India
- Occupation: Businessman
- Known for: Founding Pharmasyntez

Vikram Punia (born 15 March 1973) is an Indian and Russian entrepreneur, billionaire and the founder and sole owner of the pharmaceutical company Pharmasyntez, which is included in the list of systemically important enterprises in Russia.

The company produces antibiotics, antitubercular, antineoplastic and antiretroviral medicines.

Vikram Punia was ranked 1,689th in the world on the Forbes billionaires list in 2025, with a net worth of $2.1 billion.

In 2026, he ranked 67th in the Russian Forbes billionaire ranking, with a fortune of $2 billion.

== Biography ==
Vikram Singh Punia was born on 15 March 1973 in Jaipur (India), graduated from high school in Rajasthan and received a diploma from Birla High School in Pilani. In 1992, at the age of 19, he went to Russia on a student exchange program to pursue a medical degree and enrolled at the Irkutsk Medical Institute. Two years later, in 1994, he left his studies to pursue a business career.

Together with partners, he founded Pharmasyntez in 1997. Vikram Punia owned 80%, while Ruslan Polyakov and Anil Ran each owned 10%. In 1999, the company's first plant opened in Irkutsk, repackaging generic versions of anti-tuberculosis drugs imported from India.

In 2008, he moved to Moscow and relocated the company's headquarters to the Russian capital. In 2009, he became a Russian citizen. In 2010, he became the sole owner of the company.

At a 2016 meeting of the Leaders' Club, Vikram Punia told President Vladimir Putin that more than two million hepatitis patients in Russia needed treatment, each course of which cost approximately 3 million rubles. He also proposed legalizing compulsory licensing in Russia so that Russian pharmaceutical companies could produce generic versions of Western drugs.

Since 2017, he has been a board member of the Indo-Russian Business Council, assisting Indian entrepreneurs seeking to set up business in Russia.

Vikram Punia acts as a commercial intermediary between Moscow and New Delhi, helping Indian investors overcome barriers to entry into the Russian market.

In 2020, Pharmasyntez became the first company in Russia to receive a compulsory license to produce Remdesivir, a generic version of the American drug Veklury from Gilead. By November 2021, the company had earned 4.6 billion rubles from Remdesivir sales, allocated from budgets at various levels.

In 2025, Vikram Punia ranked 1,689th on the Forbes global billionaires list. The publication estimated his net worth at $2.1 billion.

In 2026, he ranked 67th in the Russian Forbes billionaire ranking, with a fortune of $2 billion.

== Awards and prizes ==
- Order of Friendship (2024)

== Family ==
Vikram Punia is married and has three children.
