= YBG =

YBG may refer to:

- Yash Birla Group, an Indian industrial conglomerate
- Yunus Brothers Group, a Pakistani conglomerate
- The IATA code for the airport at CFB Bagotville
- Young, Black en Gifted, an album by Sunny Boy
- Ysgol Bro Gwaun, a secondary school in the town of Fishguard in north Pembrokeshire
