= Brajlal Biyani =

Indian independence activist and writer (1896–1968)

Brijlal Biyani
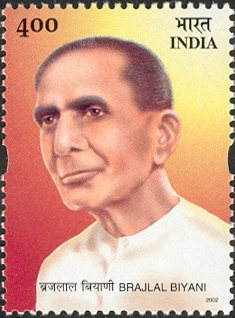

Personal details
- Born: 1886
- Died: 1968, age 82
- Children: Kamal Kishore BiyaniKamala Devi Sarda and Sarala Birla
- Education: Morris College, Nagpur

Brijlal Biyani (1896–1968) was an Indian independence activist and writer. He grew up in the Akola district of Maharashtra and studied at Morris College in Nagpur. Biyani joined the Non-Cooperation Movement in 1920. His participation in the Dahihanda Salt Satyagraha, the Jungle Satyagraha and the struggle against the Nizam led to him being sentenced to jail four times.

He was first elected as an M. L. C., as a member of the Third Legislative Council of the Central Provinces and Berar, during 1927–1930.

After independence, Biyani served as the Finance Minister of the then Madhya Pradesh State and later represented the Akola constituency.

He was later elected to the Legislative Assembly of Bombay State in the 1957 elections from Mangrulpir and was an MLA in the first assembly of Maharashtra State.

He married Savitri at a very young age. His daughter Sarla Birla was married in April 1941 to Basant Kumar Birla, son of the Indian businessman Ghanshyam Das Birla.

The Brijlal Biyani Science College at Amravati is named after him. The Government of India issued a postage stamp in his honor in 2002.
