= Kijura Tea Company =

Ugandan tea producer

Kijura Tea Co., Ltd., sometimes referred to as Kijura Tea Estate, is an Uganda-based producer of tea, which was set up in 1939 by Hugh Naylor, a colonial agriculturalist.

As per the transaction announced on 26 April 2010, the company operates as a subsidiary of Birla Holdings Ltd. At the time of the announcement, the Kijura Tea Company produced 1.2 million kilograms of tea. The purchase of the company was announced to be priced at around US$258,000. Jay Shree Tea and Industries Limited is a holding of the B.K Birla Group, of which the Kijura Tea Company is part. Its CEO is the Indian businessman Shri B. K. Birla.

On 8 February 2016, it was reported that 40,000–60,000 kg of green leaf are collected daily in Kijura, of which 16-17,000 kg tea is produced. The produce is targeted at the international market rather than locally, due to economic motives. Kijura Tea Company, as well as the largest of Uganda's tea producers, are located in the Western region.

The Dutch journalist and documentary maker Fidan Ekiz made a documentary which features documentation of illegal and aggressive forced evictions, ordered by the Kijura Tea Company, of local farmers from their homes. The homes of these people, who were reported to have lived on the lands for generations before the foreign tea company took hold of the area, were also reported to be destroyed during such evictions. Local journalists in Uganda received death threats as a result of their documentation.

One of the numerous MET stations of Uganda's Ministry of Water and Environment is based at the location of the tea company, at longitude mark 30.43 and latitude mark 0.82.
