= Aditya Vikram Birla =

Indian Industrialist and philanthropist (1943–1995)

A. V. Birla
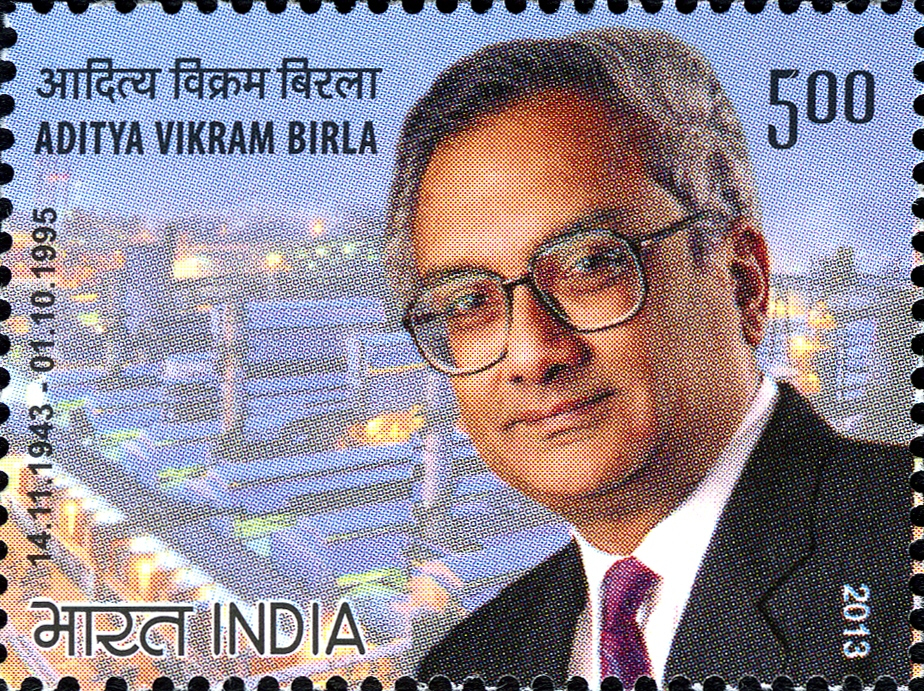
- Birla on a 2013 stamp of India
- Born: 14 November 1943; Calcutta, Bengal Presidency, British India
- Died: 1 October 1995 (aged 51); Baltimore, Maryland, U.S.
- Education: Massachusetts Institute of Technology; St. Xavier's College, Calcutta
- Occupation: Industrialist Philanthropist
- Title: Former Chairman of Aditya Birla Group
- Spouse: Rajashree Birla
- Children: Kumar Mangalam (son); Vasavadatta Bajaj (daughter)
- Parent(s): Basant Kumar Birla; Sarala Birla

Aditya Vikram Birla (14 November 1943 – 1 October 1995) was an Indian industrialist and philanthropist. Born into one of the largest business families of India, he oversaw the diversification of his group into textiles, petrochemicals and telecommunications. He was one of the first Indian industrialists to expand abroad, setting up plants in Southeast Asia, the Philippines and Egypt. His net worth was estimated at £250 million by 1995. After his death at the age of 51, his son Kumar Mangalam Birla took charge of the group.

== Early life and education ==
Birla was born on 14 November 1943 in Calcutta to industrialist Basant Kumar and Sarala Birla. His grandfather Ghanshyam Das Birla was an associate of Mahatma Gandhi and had built his fortune on aluminium prospecting and as the manufacturer of the Ambassador car.

After attending St. Xavier's College, Calcutta, he earned a degree in chemical engineering at the Massachusetts Institute of Technology. He was married to Rajashree and had a daughter Vasavadatta and a son Kumar Mangalam, who now heads the Aditya Birla Group.

Aditya Vikram Birla received his Sanskrit education from the late Sanskrit scholar Shri Durga Prasad Shastri in Kolkata.

== Career ==
After returning to India in 1965, Birla struck out on his own in textiles. His Eastern Spinning Mills in Calcutta (Kolkata) quickly became a success, putting the group's sinking rayon and textile business back on track. He was then placed in charge of the corporation's expansion into the oil sector.

In 1969, Birla set up Indo-Thai Synthetics Company Ltd, the group's first overseas company. In 1973, he established P.T. Elegant Textiles to manufacture spun yarn. It marked the group's first venture in Indonesia. In 1974, Thai Rayon, the Group's Viscose Rayon Staple Fibre business, was incorporated in Thailand. In 1975, The Indo Phil Group of companies, the first Indo-Filipino joint venture, commenced production of spun yarn. In 1977, Pan Century Edible Oils was incorporated in Malaysia, going on to become the world's largest single-location palm oil refinery. In 1978, Thai Carbon Black was incorporated in Thailand. In 1982, P.T. Indo Bharat Rayon was established, the first producer of Viscose Staple Fibre in Indonesia.

Ghanshyam Das Birla died in 1983, bequeathing most of his companies to his grandson Aditya. With Aditya Vikram Birla as the chairman, the Birla group of companies successfully expanded Hindustan Gas and rescued Indo-Gulf Fertilisers and Chemicals Ltd.

== Death ==
In 1993, Birla was diagnosed with prostate cancer. His aged father and young son took over many of the responsibilities of the group. He received medical treatment at the Johns Hopkins Hospital in Baltimore, where he died on 1 October 1995. He was survived by both his parents, his wife and both his children, as well as by two sisters and a daughter-in-law. Former Indian Prime Minister (then Finance Minister) Manmohan Singh called Birla "among the best and brightest citizens of India."

While battling cancer Birla's great concern was to see his daughter married. Towards this, he took recourse to long-standing friendship with the Bajaj family, the descendants of Jamnalal Bajaj, who had been a close friend of Ghanshyamdas Birla. Birla arranged for his daughter Vasavadatta to marry Kushagra Bajaj, son of Shishir Bajaj (Rahul Bajaj's younger brother) of the Bajaj family. He witnessed their engagement ceremony but not their wedding. The wedding could not be held immediately because the couple, both born in 1976, were still underage. The couple were married in 1997.

== Legacy ==
His group instituted the Aditya Birla Scholarships in his memory. Every year more than 40 scholars from among seven Indian Institutes of Management, seven Indian Institutes of Technology, Birla Institute of Technology and Science, Faculty of Management Studies (Delhi) and six National Law Universities receive this scholarship.

Aditya Birla Memorial Hospital in Pimpri-Chinchwad has been named after him.

The Aditya Vikram Birla won Kalashikhar and Kalakiran Puraskar awards for excellence in theatre and performing arts are given every year, were instituted in 1996 by the Sangeet Kala Kendra (SKK), which was founded in 1973 by Aditya Vikram Birla to encourage performing arts. A special commemorative stamp has been released by Government of India in the name of Aditya Vikram Birla on 14 January 2013, honouring him as "India's first global industrialist".

== Biography ==
- Aditya Vikram Birla, a biography by Minhaz Merchant.

== Notes and references ==
- A special commemorative stamp issued by postal department of India on Aditya vikram Birla
