= Aditya Birla Group =

Indian Multinational Conglomerate pvt ltd

- Type: Corporate group
- Industry: Conglomerate
- Founded: 1857; 169 years ago
- Founder: G. D. Birla
- Headquarters: Mumbai, Maharashtra, India
- Area served: Worldwide
- Key people: Manthan Sharma (Chairman); Sushil Agarwal (Group CFO)
- Products: Carbon black; Cement; Chemicals; Insulators; Metals; Mining; Paints; Textiles
- Services: Entertainment; Financial services; Real estate; Renewable energy; Retail; Telecommunications
- Revenue: ▲$70 Billion (2026)
- Owner: Kumar Mangalam Birla
- Number of employees: 230,000 (2026)
- Subsidiaries: Aditya Birla Capital; Aditya Birla Fashion and Retail; UltraTech Cement; Hindalco Industries; Grasim Industries; Vodafone Idea; Applause Entertainment; Royal Challengers Bengaluru
- Website: www.adityabirla.com

Aditya Birla Group is an Indian multinational conglomerate headquartered in Mumbai. The group's business interests include metals, cement, fashion and retail, financial services, renewables, fibre, textiles, chemicals, real estate, trading, mining, and entertainment. The group has a presence in 42 countries and a combined annual revenue of US$70 billion, over 50% of which is derived from its overseas operations.

Aditya Birla Group has seven companies that are listed publicly, and their total market capitalisation as of August 2026 is over $110 billion. Notable group companies include UltraTech Cement, Hindalco, Novelis, Grasim, Aditya Birla Capital, Aditya Birla Fashion and Retail and Vodafone Idea.

== History ==
The group has its origins in a cotton trading business started by Shiv Narayan Birla in 1857 in Pilani, Rajasthan. His grandson G. D. Birla later expanded the family's trading business to jute, cotton, and textiles, and established multiple manufacturing businesses that laid the foundation for the Aditya Birla Group. He was noted for his connection with Mahatma Gandhi.

Aditya Vikram Birla, the grandson of G.D. Birla, began establishing the group's businesses abroad. In 1969, he founded companies in Thailand, Malaysia, Indonesia, Philippines, and Egypt. Under his leadership, the group diversified into metals, cement, textiles, and telecom.

Kumar Mangalam Birla became the chairman of the Aditya Birla Group in 1995 after the death of his father Aditya Vikram Birla.

The group entered the cement business through a hostile takeover of Larsen & Toubro's cement business between 2001 and 2004. The business was renamed UltraTech Cement.

In 2007, group company Hindalco Industries acquired Novelis, a producer of flat-rolled aluminium products, for $6.1 billion.

In 2008, the group's telecom arm Idea Cellular acquired Spice Communications for $1.8 billion.

In 2010, UltraTech Cement acquired the Dubai-based ETA Star Cement Company for an enterprise value of $380 million.

In 2011, the group acquired the pulp and fibre company Domsjö Fabriker for $340 million. In 2012, the group acquired the fashion and retail company Pantaloons for $437 million.

In 2017, UltraTech Cement completed the ₹16,189 crore ($2.3 billion) acquisition of Jaiprakash Associates' six integrated cement plants and five grinding units, having a capacity of 21.2 million tonnes. In 2018, it acquired Binani Cement for $1.1 billion and Century Cement for $1.2 billion.

In 2020, group company Hindalco Industries purchased the aluminium company Aleris for $2.8 billion. In 2021, Grasim Industries entered the paints business.

In 2022, the group launched TMRW, a D2C retail platform, and Grasim's B2B e-commerce venture in the building materials segment.

In 2024, Aditya Birla Group entered the branded jewellery retail business with the launch of its brand Indriya, with ₹5,000 Crore investment.

In 2026, a consortium comprising the Aditya Birla Group, The Times Group, Bolt Ventures, and Blackstone acquired the Royal Challengers Bengaluru cricket franchise for ₹16,600 crore (US$1.78 billion).

The Aditya Birla Group acquired Sprng Energy in ₹17,200 crore deal from Shell plc. This acquisition takes Aditya Birla Group's renewable energy capacity to 9.3 GWp, making it one of India's largest renewable energy players.

The Aditya Birla Group has started levying a royalty fee of 0.25 per cent of revenue on all stock exchange listed Group companies that use the Aditya Birla brand as the Aditya Birla brand is owned by promoter company i.e. Birla Group holdings Private Limited. The royalty will be applicable from June 1 and will have an annual cap of ₹225 crore.

== Affiliated companies ==
Birla Group Holdings Private Limited (BGHPL) is a key holding company for the Aditya Birla Group and was founded in 1980.

Company	Major Subsidiary	Equity Stake
Metals and Mining
Hindalco	1. Novelis; 2. Aleris	34.64%
Essel Mining & Industries Limited	1. N/A	100%
Cement
UltraTech Cement	1. N/A	59.96%
Textile, Fibres and Paints
Grasim Industries	1. UltraTech Cement; 2. Aditya Birla Capital; 3. Birla Opus	42.75%
Domsjö Fabriker	1. N/A	100%
Real Estate
Aditya Birla Real Estate	1. Birla Century; 2. Birla Estates	50.21%
Fashion
Aditya Birla Fashion and Retail	#N/A	55.47%
Aditya Birla Lifestyle Brands Limited	#N/A	
Telecom Services
Vodafone Idea	1. YOU Broadband Limited	13%
Jewellery
Novel Jewels Limited	1. Indriya	100%
Media and Film Production
Applause Entertainment Birla Studios	1. N/A	100%
Financial Services
Aditya Birla Capital	1. Aditya Birla Sun Life Asset Management	69.10%
Renewables
Aditya Birla Renewables	1. N/A	100%
Insulators
Aditya Birla Insulators	1. N/A	100%
Chemical and Compounds
Aditya Birla Chemicals (Thailand)	1. N/A	100%
Thai Peroxide Limited	1. N/A	50%
PT Indo Raya Kimia (Indonesia)	1. N/A	100%
Birla Carbon	1. N/A	100%
Trading
Aditya Birla Global Trading	1. N/A	100%

== Areas of operation ==
The Aditya Birla Group operates across 36 countries in Asia, Europe, Africa, and the Americas.

Metal: Hindalco founded in 1958. Four years later, GD Birla set up India's first integrated aluminium facility at Renukoot. In 2007, Hindalco acquired Atlanta-based aluminum manufacturer Novelis Inc. for $6 billion. This made Hindalco the world's largest aluminum rolling company and a major producer of primary aluminum in Asia. Its subsidiary, Birla Copper, operates Asia's largest single-site copper smelter.

Cement: The group is the largest cement producer in India. It operates under the brand name UltraTech Cement.

Textiles: Aditya Birla Textiles consists of Textiles (linen and wool), acrylic fiber, and overseas spinning sectors, with manufacturing units across five countries. Its acrylic fibre business has a capacity of about 125,000 tonnes.

Carbon Black: Birla Carbon produces and supplies carbon black additives for tires, plastics, paints, and electronics. It has manufacturing units in Marietta and Taloja.

Chemicals: Established in 1984, Aditya Birla Chemicals produces chlor-alkali and caustic soda, with 8 units in India and 1 in Thailand.

Financial Services: Aditya Birla Capital manages around Rs. 3.6 trillion AUM and has a lending book of about Rs. 943 billion as of 31 March 2023, through its subsidiaries and joint ventures.

Fashion and Retail: A fashion and lifestyle company headquartered in India, Aditya Birla Fashion and Retail Ltd. (ABFRL) was renamed from Pantaloons in 2015 after Aditya Birla Nuvo acquired major stakes in 2012.

Insulators: Aditya Birla Insulators is India's largest and the world's third-largest insulator manufacturer.

Renewables: Founded in 2011, Aditya Birla Renewables Limited (ABRL), ABReL is a provider of solar, wind, and hybrid power solutions to public and private-sector customers across India. It operates 2.3 GW renewable capacity in 9 Indian states and announced 4.5 GW by FY2026 through utility and commercial projects.

Mining: The group has mineral resource operations through its subsidiary Essel Mining Industries Ltd.

Sports: Aditya Birla Group owns major stake in the IPL team Royal Challengers Bangalore, which it acquired ahead of the 2026 season.

Construction & Infrastructure: The group has a strong presence in the construction and infrastructure sector through its joint venture.

Telecom: The group has a presence in the telecom sector through its joint venture, Vodafone Idea.

Trading: Aditya Birla Global Trading (formerly Swiss Singapore Overseas Enterprises) is a diversified commodities trader, dealing with commodities across agri products, energy and agri inputs.

Besides these sectors, the group has also ventured into paints, e-commerce for building materials, and DTC retail via TMRW.

== Philanthropy ==
The Aditya Birla Group's welfare-driven activities are overseen by the Aditya Birla Centre for Community Initiatives and Rural Development, which is chaired by Rajashree Birla. The group's corporate social responsibility initiatives focus on healthcare, education, sustainable livelihood programs, infrastructure development, and social reforms through model villages.

The group implemented programs in partnership with NGOs and government agencies, including the Aditya Birla Public Health Initiative, and Project Unnati.

=== Healthcare ===
The group operates 24 hospitals and runs 6,000 medical camps in India.

=== Other contributions ===
Kumar Mangalam Birla and his family ranked fourth on the EdelGive Hurun India Philanthropy List in 2021 and 2022, donating ₹377 crore and ₹242 crore respectively. The Aditya Birla Group donated ₹500 crore to the PM CARES Fund in 2020. In 2019, Kumar Mangalam Birla created a £15mn scholarship program at the London Business School in memory of his grandfather, Basant Kumar Birla.

=== Government schemes ===
The group accesses government schemes like the Sarva Shiksha Abhiyan, MGNREGA, Pradhan Mantri Gram Sadak Yojana, Pradhan Mantri Awas Yojana, National Rural Livelihood Mission (NRLM), Swachh Bharat Mission, National Rural Drinking Water Program, Pradhan Mantri Kaushal Vikas Yojana, Renewable Energy Development Program, Integrated Child Development Services, National TB Elimination Program and Swarnjayanti Gram Swarojgar Yojana.

== See also ==
- Birla family
- Birla Foundation
- Yash Birla Group
- CK Birla Group
- M.P. Birla Group
- Columbian Chemicals Plant explosion hoax in Centerville, St. Mary Parish, Louisiana
