= Aditya Birla Memorial Hospital =

Medical centre in Pune, India

Coordinates: 18°37′33″N 73°46′29″E

Aditya Birla Memorial Hospital is a multi-speciality medical centre in Pimpri-Chinchwad, Pune, India. It is owned by the Aditya Birla Group.

Rajashree Birla, chairperson of the Aditya Birla Foundation which is funding the medical centre, is steering this project. It is Maharashtra's First Joint Commission International and National Accreditation Board for Hospital accredited hospital, and also India's first HACCP and ISO: 22000:2005 certified hospital.
