= Mahadevi Birla World Academy =

Location
- 17A Darga Road; Kolkata, West Bengal; India; 22°32′29″N 88°22′17″E

Information
- Motto: Tamaso Ma Jyotirgamay (Lead us from Darkness to Light)
- Established: 1959; 67 years ago
- Principal: Mrs.Anjana Saha
- Enrollment: 3000
- Website: www.mbwa.org.in

Mahadevi Birla World Academy, Park Circus, is located at 17A Darga Road Kolkata, India. Founded in 1959, by illustrious industrialist Late B K Birla in the name of his mother, Late Mahadevi Birla, it is an English medium, co-education school imparting education from upper-infant to twelfth standard, affiliated by the CBSE board. The school’s motto is "Tamaso Ma Jyotirgamay" ("Lead Us From Darkness To Light").

== Premises ==
The school premises includes:

- Primary section for classes Nursery to 1
- Junior Section for classes 2 to V
- Middle Section for classes VI to VIII
- Senior Section for classes IX and X
- Senior Secondary Section for classes XI and XII
- Krida Kunj – the sports building
- Stationery shop
- Canteen

== Krida Kunj ==
- Swimming
- Roller Skating
- Martial Arts
- Badminton
- Darts
- Table Tennis
- Carrom
- Pickleball
- Chess
- Football
- Cricket

== Controversy ==
The School had recently been in the news for making a U-turn on its decision to be a co-education School. The School was opened for boys in 2012 and in 2015 it backtracked on its decision and decided to become a Girls' School again. The decision attracted a lot of criticism from the parents of the boys already studying in the school. Parents protested in front of the School for its decision and demanded a rollback on 7 August 2015. The School was temporarily closed due to parents' agitation on 8 August 2015.

The school decided to continue as a co-ed in the future. Admission notice for 2016-2017 was given accordingly.
