= Yash Birla Group =

Indian industrial conglomerate

The Yash Birla Group
- Type: Public company (BSE: 500335)
- Industry: Conglomerate
- Founded: 1980s; 45 years ago
- Founder: Raja Baldeo Das Birla
- Headquarters: Mumbai, India
- Area served: Worldwide
- Key people: Yashovardhan Birla (Chairman)
- Products: Steel, Information technology, Education, Textiles, Publication, Lifestyle, Travel & Power, Financial service, Infrastructure,
- Revenue: ₹30 billion (US$320 million)
- Number of employees: 3,363 (2010)
- Subsidiaries: Melstar Information Technologies, Birla Shloka Edutech
- Website: yashbirlagroup.com

Yash Birla Group is Indian industrial conglomerate group based in Mumbai, Maharashtra. Its chairman Yashovardhan Birla, is a member of the Birla family. The group has diversified interest in industries like steel pipes, machine tools, cutting tools, tool holders, iron castings, power solution products, multipurpose engines pumps, electrical appliances, textiles, carpets, furnishing, lifestyle, infotech, publication, travel, electricity, property development, cotton ginning etc. The Group traces its origins to the businesses started by various members of the Birla family. The group today has 10 publicly listed subsidiaries in India. The group is currently facing major financial and legal bottlenecks.

In June 2013, the group was declared a Non Performing Asset (NPA) account for non payment of dues. Further in 2016, UCO Bank also published a notice indicating Birla as defaulter. On 16 June 2019, he was declared wilful defaulter by the bank with outstanding dues of over 67 crores.`

== Subsidiaries ==
Zenith Birla (India) Ltd: Zenith Birla (India) Limited was incorporated in 1960, and commenced its commercial production in 1962. ZBIL, a flagship company of Yash Birla Group, is a pioneer in Manufacture and Exports of Steel Pipes, Tubes, and Hollow Sections from India. The Company's plants are located at Khopoli, Tarapur & Murbad. The Khopoli Plant has a complete Manufacturing and Residential complex for its employees with facilities of School, Club House, Guest House, Temple and Auditorium.

- Birla Pacific Medspa -Bse India -stock trading was suspended due to non-compliance from June 2015.
- Birla Power
- Birla Infrasolutions Ltd
- Birla Precision Technologies Limited
- Birla Transasia Carpets Ltd,
- Birla Perucchini Ltd,
- Birla Electricals Ltd
- Birla Lifestyle Ltd,
- Birla Concepts (India) Pvt. Ltd
- Birla Shloka Infotech Ltd,
- Birla Cotsyn (India) Ltd

=== Birla Precision Technologies ===
Birla Precision Technologies Limited
- Type: Public
- Traded as: BSE: 522105
- ISIN: INE372E01025
- Industry: Automative components, Industrial Equipments
- Founded: 1937
- Key people: Vedant Birla (Chairman & Managing Director)
- Website: birlaprecision.com

Birla Precision Technologies Limited is an Indian engineering company. It was established in 1937, and is a part of the group.

Birla Precision Tech has 5 divisions, spread over 4 factories. It is mainly in the auto component and industrial engineering domain. The company exports to more than 25 countries. It is listed on the BSE Stock Exchange. The chairman & managing director of the company is Vedant Birla.

Earlier JVs made in the group include Birla Yamaha, Birla 3M, Birla Kennametal, Birla Perucchini, Birla Delonghi, Dagger Forst, South Pacific Viscose, etc. Major customers of the companies include Cummins, Honeywell, government engineering companies, defence, and aerospace.

== See also ==
- Aditya Birla Group
- CKA Birla Group
- M.P Birla Group
- Birla Family
