= B K Birla Centre For Education =

Location
- Pune; Shirgaon - Gahunje; District - Pune, Maharashtra, 410506; India; 18°41′5.79″N 73°41′57.96″E

Information
- Founded: 2 May 1998; 28 years ago
- Founder: Basant Kumar Birla
- Principal: Dr Rajeev Kumar Chauhan
- Gender: Male
- Age: 10 to 18
- Language: English
- Campuses: 64 acres (26 ha)
- Houses: Agni, Prithvi, Salil, Vyom
- Affiliation: CBSE
- Website: bkbirlacentre.com

B K Birla Centre For Education is a Boys' residential school located near Pune, India. Affiliated to the Central Board of Secondary Education syllabus, it caters for 600 students from class IV to XII. The school's first principal was G. C. Rao, who was further succeeded by S. K. Bhardwaj and then Subhash Kumar. The school also had a temporary principal, Matthew Menezis, before Bhardwaj. Dr Sanyal was the Principal after Dr Subhash Kumar.

Dr Rajeev Kumar Chauhan is the current principal of the school. The School has been given the NABET, IPSC and NPSC status.
