= Birla Institute of Scientific Research =

Indian research institute

Coordinates: 26.9055289°N 75.8053789°E

The Birla Institute of Scientific Research (BISR) is a private not-for-profit research institute based in Jaipur, India. The organisation is a sister concern of Birla Institute of Technology, Mesra, Ranchi. The institute's research goals is purely on Research and Development in the area of Biotechnology, Bioinformatics and Remote Sensing. The institute has had a few funded projects from Department of Science and Technology, Indian Council of Medical Research, Government of India. The organisation is a part of Biotechnology Information Systems Network, Government of India (BTISNET).

== Departments ==
- Department of Biotechnology and Bioinformatics
- Department of Remote Sensing

== Collaborations ==
BISR currently has research collaboration with the following organisations.

- Birla Institute of Technology, Mesra, Ranchi
- S.M.S. Medical College and Research Centre, Jaipur
- L' Institut National de La Recherche Scientifique-Eau Terre et Environment Centre, Quebec, Canada
- Indian Academy of Clinical Research, Jaipur
