= Technological Institute of Textile & Sciences =

Technical college at Bhiwani, Haryana, India

Technological Institute of Textile & Science
- Motto: To become excellent knowledge enterprise
- Type: Private
- Established: 1943
- Founders: G. D. Birla
- Affiliations: Maharishi Dayanand University, AICTE, NBA, NAAC
- Director: Prof. B.K Behera
- Location: Bhiwani, Haryana, India, Bhiwani, Haryana, India
- Campus: 113 acres (46 ha); Urban
- Nickname: TIT&S
- Website: http://www.titsbhiwani.ac.in

The Technological Institute of Textile and Sciences (TITS) is an Indian technical college. It offers engineering and postgraduate programs.

The institute provides lectures by in-house and visiting faculty, discussions, seminars, project assignments and visits to industrial and project sites. The institute is attached to a textile factory where students train under actual mill conditions and working environments. Students undergo extensive practical and theoretical training. They learn to handle mechanical and administrative issues independently. TITS graduates are readily accepted by the textile industry.

== Administration ==
Its administration vests in the TIT&S College Managing Committee. The committee is constituted according to the constitution prescribed by the All India Council for Technical Education.

The institute is attached to a textile mill to train students under actual working conditions and for conducting research. The college's focus on textile technology is unique in India and uncommon elsewhere. It is among the few (others being the National Institutes of Technology and Indian Institutes of Technology) in India that offers degrees in technology (BTech with Honours) at the undergraduate level as opposed to a B.E. (Bachelor of Engineering).

The Institute is NAAC accredited with B++ Grade and is approved under Section 2(f) and 12 (B) of UGC Act 1956.

== History ==
The college was founded in 1943 by Padma Vibhushan, Dr. Ghanshyam Das Birla and Pushkar D Makharia under the auspices of the Birla Education Trust.

The college was initially affiliated with the Department of Industrial Training, Punjab, for a 3-year diploma course in spinning and weaving technology. TIT&S remained part of the Birla Education Trust until 31 March 1985. Thereafter, it separated from the trust as an independent society. It was registered under the West Bengal Societies Registration Act of 1961 known as "The Technological Institute of Textiles," which was formed to manage it. To reflect the expanded instructional facilities and new courses, it was renamed "The Technological Institute of Textile & Sciences".
