= Rajashree Birla =

Indian Philanthropist

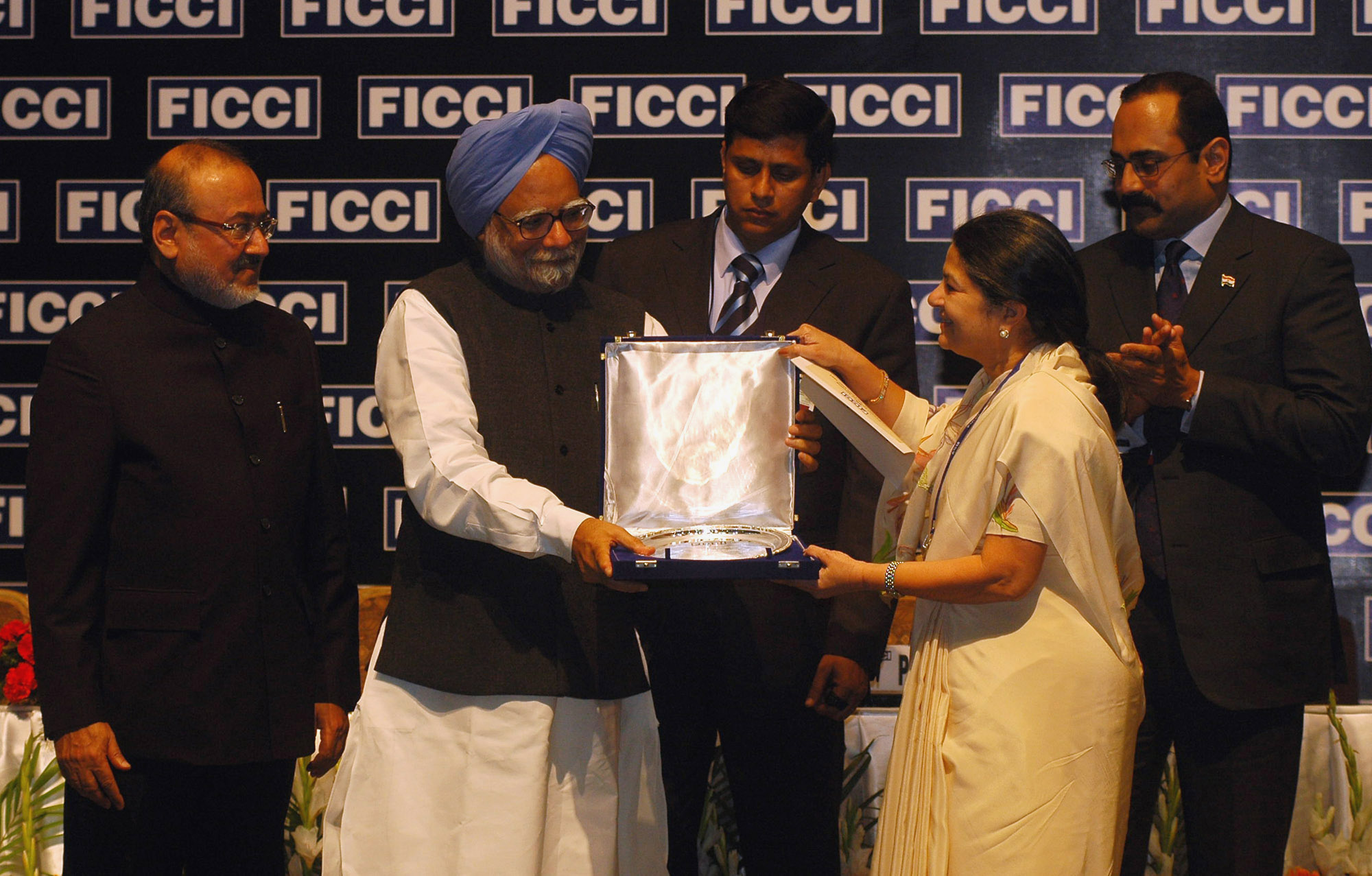
- The Prime Minister, Dr. Manmohan Singh presenting award for excellency to the Director, of Grasim Industries Ltd (Cement Division-South), Tamil Nadu, Mrs. Rajashree Birla, in the field of “Outstanding Achievement in Environmental Sustainability of Businesses”, at the 80th Annual Session of Federation of Indian Chambers of Commerce and Industry (FICCI), in New Delhi on February 15, 2008.
- Born: 1 January 1948 (age 78); Bikaner, Rajasthan, India
- Occupation: Businessperson
- Spouse: Aditya Vikram Birla
- Children: Kumar Mangalam Birla (son), Vasavadatta Bajaj (daughter)
- Awards: Padma Bhushan; Women Achievers Award; Corporate Citizen of the Year; Seva Shiromani Award; Citizen of Bombay Award 2003; The Pride of India Award
- Website: Official web page

Rajashree Birla is an Indian philanthropist. She is married to the late Aditya Birla (scion of the Birla family of business magnates). After her husband's death in 1995, Rajashree began working in CSR and charity sectors, developing a large philanthropic organization funded by her family. In 2011, the Government of India honoured her with the Padma Bhushan, the third highest civilian award, for her services to society.

== Biography ==
Rajashree was born in 1948 in Bikaner, in the Rajasthan state of India, and was later raised in Madurai, in the Indian state of Tamil Nadu. Her father, Radhakishen Fomra, held a dealership agency for Burmah Shell. Her mother, Parvati Devi Fomra, was a home-maker. The family were Marwari Vaishyas and belonged to the Maheshwari sub-caste.

Rajashree and her sisters studied at St. Joseph's convent school in Madurai, Following the usual Indian custom, Rajshree's marriage was arranged by her parents into a family belonging to their specific Maheshwari sub-caste. The nuptials were celebrated in three stages, as per the Marwari tradition. The first stage, being the engagement, was performed when Rajashree was around 10 years old. Her fiancé was Aditya Vikram Birla, scion of the Birla family and grandson of the legendary business magnate Ghanshyam Das Birla. The second stage comprised the initial ceremony of marriage (essentially an irrevocable engagement), which was performed when Rajashree was 14, and the final ceremonies (gauna and vidaai) was performed in 1965, when she was 17 years old. At this point, she departed her parents’ house in Madurai and moved into her in-law's house in Kolkata.

By this time, she had completed her matriculation and was studying at Fatima College in Madurai. With the encouragement from her husband and his parents, she enrolled at Loreto College, Kolkata and took a degree in Arts from the University of Calcutta.

In June 1967, Rajashree became a mother with the birth of a son, Kumar Mangalam Birla. This was followed in June 1976 by a daughter, Vasavadatta. With the full support of her family, Rajashree completed her education (albeit with a break for the birth of Kumar Mangalam) and took a degree in Arts from Kolkata university. For the next three decades, she devoted herself to caring for her family and raising her two children, viewing this as her primary responsibility. Only after they had grown up and settled down did she devote her energy to public or social welfare. Throughout her life, Rajashree has maintained an understated, unostentatious lifestyle and a middle-class sense of morality and family responsibility, bringing up her children also with the same values. She has in interviews attributed this quality to the influence of Mahatma Gandhi upon her family (Ghanshyam Das Birla was a close associate of the Mahatma) and the teachings of the Bhagwat Gita. She has stated that her favourite axiom at all time, good and bad alike, is the phrase "This too will pass," a quotation from the Bhagwat Gita.

Rajashree Birla sits on the boards of her family businesses in India and abroad and heads the Aditya Birla Centre for Community Initiatives and Rural Development, the charity arm of the Aditya Birla Group, which looks after the corporate social responsibilities of the conglomerate. She lives in South Mumbai with her son, Kumar Mangalam Birla and his family.

== Social service ==
=== Aditya Birla Centre for Community Initiatives and Rural Development ===
As the Chairperson of the Aditya Birla Centre for Community Initiatives and Rural Development (ABCCIR), Rajashree oversees the charity efforts, development activities and community initiatives of the Aditya Birla Group, with the help of ₹ 1,600 crores, the Aditya Birla Group, spends on CSR activities, of which ₹ 40 crores goes for educational activities. The main focusses are on education, employment, drinking water and women empowerment initiatives. She is also involved in activities related to assistance to rural poor and physically disabled people, widow remarriage and activism against dowry. ABCCIR assists in the running of 42 schools and 18 hospitals and pays for the education of around 18,000 students. These activities are reported to have assisted around 7 million people in about 3000 villages around the globe and has presence in countries like Thailand and Egypt.

=== Health care ===
Rajashree Birla, as a tribute to her late husband, set up a 325-bed hospital, Aditya Birla Memorial Hospital, at a cost of US$ 30 million, in Pune, 2006. The hospital complex, spread over a land measuring 18 acres, is managed by the Aditya Birla Center for Community Initiatives and Rural Development and is funded by the Aditya Birla Foundation.

Rajashree also oversees the running of a healthcare initiative which conducts around 3500 medical camps a year, attending to reportedly 3 million patients. The initiative also conducts around 20,000 polio vaccines to children. Rajashree has also donated US$1 million to Rotary International for the eradication of polio.

=== Other social activities ===
Rajashree Birla is in active association with Population First a non-governmental organisation dedicated to the cause of female foeticide. She maintains a close association with Habitat for Humanity, sits on the Boards of its Asia Pacific and Global committees and attended Habitat conference in Manila, the Philippines, in 2012. The same year, she rallied a group of celebrity cricketers such as M. S. Dhoni and collected a sum of US$ 2 million for the efforts of the organization. She has personally arranged a contribution of ₹ 100 million to the Habitat for Humanity.

On the issue of widow remarriage, which is still a taboo among many village people in India, Rajashree and her volunteers have worked with the village chieftains for their support. She is reported to be largely successful and her foundation has distributed monies in the form of loans to the prospective husbands for starting small businesses. She admits that this initiative is the one closest to her heart

In Rajasthan, she has helped build a charity kitchen which supplies 30,000 meals every day, in association with the State Government's free lunch program for poor children studying in Government schools. She is in the process of setting up two more kitchens in Odisha, at a cost of US$ one million, to cater to 60,000 children. She is also planning to open vocational institutes in Kerala.

Rajashree Birla has built a memorial to her late husband in Pilani, Rajasthan and is looking to build a temple in Pune.

== Positions ==
Apart from being the Director board member of most of the Aditya Birla Group companies, Rajashree Birla also holds or has held various other posts of importance.

- Chairperson of the Advisory Board – University of Kanchipuram
- Chairperson - Advisory Committee - Habitat for Humanity India Trust
- Member of the Advisory Board – The Research Society for the Care, Treatment and Training of Children in Need of Special Care, Mumbai
- Trustee – Population First, India
- Trustee – BAIF Development Research Foundation, Pune
- Member – Tirumala Tirupathi Devasthanam Development Advisory Council
- Member of the Executive Committee – Gandhi Smriti – 2003–06
- Member of the Executive Committee – Darshan Smriti – 2003–06
- President – Sangeet Kala Kendra
- Trustee – Anand Ashram Trust, Mumbai
- Trustee – Jayashree Charity (1962) Trust, Kolkata
- Trustee – Breach Candy Hospital and Research Centre, Mumbai

Consul General- Honorary Consulate General of the Philippines in Mumbai

She is also the trustee of many foundations related to her family such as G. D. Birla Medical Research and Education Foundation, Vasavadatta Foundation, Neerja Foundation, Rajashree Foundation, Aditya Birla Foundation and Aditya Vikram Birla Memorial Trust.

== Awards and recognitions ==
- Padma Bhushan – 2011
- Women Achievers' Award – Archana Trust, Mumbai – 2001–02
- Corporate Citizen of the Year – The Economic Times – 2001–02
- Seva Shiromani Award – Rotarians in Action – 2003
- Citizen of Bombay Award – Rotary Club of Bombay – 2003
- The Pride of India Award – Rotary Club of Mulund – 2004
- Women of the Decade Award – ASSOCHAM's Ladies League – 2004

25th Lal Bahadur Shastri National Award For Excellence 2024

== See also ==
- Kumar Mangalam Birla
