= B.K. Birla Institute of Engineering & Technology =

Coordinates: 28°22′07.6″N 75°35′21.3″E

- बी के बिरला अभियांत्रिकी एवं प्रौद्योगिकी संस्थान
- Seal of B.K. Birla Institute of Engineering & Technology
- Motto: कौशलम बलम्
- Type: Private institution
- Established: 2007
- Affiliations: Bikaner Technical University (2018 - present); Rajasthan Technical University (2007-2018)
- Director: Dr B. K. Rout
- Location: Pilani, Rajasthan, India
- Campus: Area 15 acres (0.061 km^{2})
- Website: bkbiet.ac.in

B.K. Birla Institute of Engineering & Technology (BKBIET) is a private engineering college located in Pilani, Rajasthan, India. It was founded in 2007 by Shree Krishnarpan Charity Trust, with Late Basant Kumar Birla as chairman. Following his death, industrialist Kumar Mangalam Birla assumed the chairmanship of the Trust.

== Description ==
BKBIET, Pilani is part of Shree Krishnarpan Charity Trust, under the chairmanship of Late Basant Kumar Birla. The Institute was established in 2007. It is approved by AICTE, New Delhi and affiliated to Bikaner Technical University, Kota.

== Academic Governance ==
The Institute has an Academic Advisory Board comprising senior academicians (including Group Vice-Chancellor & Director, BITS Pilani, Pilani Campus) from the Birla Institute of Technology and Science (BITS), Pilani and distinguished alumni, which provides strategic guidance on academic programs and curriculum development.

The Institute is headed by Prof. Bijay Kumar Rout, Director of BKBIET, who is a senior academic from BITS Pilani, where he has served as a Professor in the Department of Mechanical Engineering and held multiple academic leadership roles. His appointment further strengthens the academic linkage between BKBIET and BITS Pilani.

== Undergraduate programs ==
BKBIET offers a Bachelor of Technology in six areas:

- Computer Science Engineering
- Information Technology
- Electrical Engineering
- Electronics & Communication Engineering
- Mechanical Engineering
- Artificial Intelligence
- Data Science(New 2021 Onwards)

== Campus ==
The Institute is located near CSIR-CEERI and BITS Pilani campus.

=== Residential and dining facilities ===
The campus contains six hostels: four for boys and two for girls. All told, these modern-looking hostels span 31,200 square feet and contain triple, double, and single rooms. Although in a separate building, the mess is attached to the hostel buildings. A common room sits above the mess and contains games like chess, carom and table tennis. Students may also dine at the campus "robo canteen".

== International collaboration ==
=== BKBIET International Relations Division ===
BKBIET International Relations Division (BIRD) was established on May 14, 2011. The objective of the BIRD is to encourage the students of the institute to embrace the global education. The division motivates students to go on internships, look into avenues of research and management after the completion of the bachelor's degree, and serves as a pool of information to all those who are interested in doing higher studies abroad. The majority of the students who took internships went to universities of France, most prominently University of Nantes, University d’Haute Alsace, and IUT Angoulême. The measure of cooperation is exhibited by the fact that an unprecedented Joint Masters Programme is being set up between Polytech Nantes and BKBIET Pilani. The students are highly motivated to take up higher education abroad in a scene where their peers in other institutes are trying to settle in for a job. The students have been awarded various scholarships. Counselling, visas, scholarships and other help have always been available for the students of BKBIET through BIRD.

=== International Journal of Microwave and Optical Technology (IJMOT) ===
The International Journal of Microwave and Optical Technology (IJMOT) provides a common platform to disseminate original research work and invited tutorials in the area of microwave technology, microwave photonics and optical technology. It is a completely online journal. Manuscripts are solicited to cover original theoretical and /or experimental work in the areas of microwave technology, optical communications and the emerging area of microwave photonics. IJMOT is now indexed by SCOPUS, Google, EI-Compendex, EBSCO, and Media Finder.

== See also ==
- List of universities in India
- List of institutions of higher education in India
- Education in India
