= Basant Kumar Birla =

Indian industrialist and philanthropist (1921–2019)

Sir B. K. Birla GCM
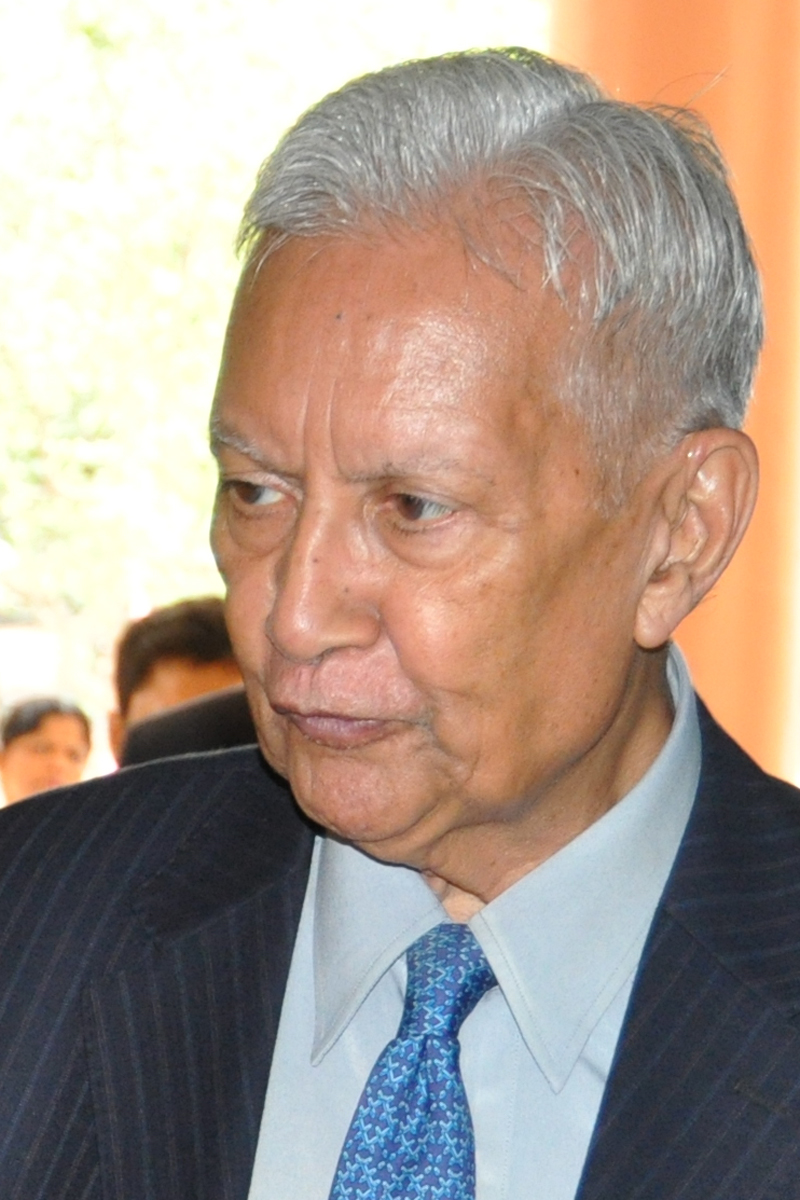
- Born: 12 January 1921; Calcutta, Bengal Presidency, British India
- Died: 3 July 2019 (aged 98); Mumbai, Maharashtra, India
- Citizenship: Indian
- Education: University of Calcutta, (Bsc)
- Occupations: Businessman, Educationist
- Years active: 1942–2019
- Known for: Industrialist, Philanthropist
- Title: Chairman of Birla Group
- Predecessor: Ghanshyam Das Birla
- Successor: Aditya Vikram Birla
- Spouse: Sarala Birla (m. 1942)
- Children: 3 including Aditya Vikram Birla
- Father: Ghanshyam Das Birla
- Relatives: Kumar Mangalam Birla (grandson); Ananya Birla (great-granddaughter); KK Birla (brother)
- Awards: Padma Bhushan; Order of the Holy Trinity; Order of Menelik II

Basant Kumar Birla (12 January 1921 – 3 July 2019) was an Indian industrialist and philanthropist of the Birla family. He was chairman of the Krishnarpan Charity Trust, BK Birla Institute of Engineering & Technology (BKBIET) and various educational trusts and institutes.

== Biography ==
Birla, the youngest son of philanthropist Ghanshyam Das Birla, was born on 12 January 1921. By fifteen years of age, he was already actively associated with a large number of companies and eventually became the chairman of Kesoram Industries. In this role, he concentrated on the industries of cotton, viscose, polyester and nylon yarns, refractory, paper, shipping, tyrecord, transparent paper, spun pipe, cement, tea, coffee, cardamom, chemicals, plywood, MDF Board, etc.

In 1959, he established the Indo Ethiopian Textiles Share Company, which was the first major joint venture by any Indian industrialist. In response, the Emperor of Ethiopia, Haile Selassie I, awarded him the medal of the Order of Menelik II, the highest Ethiopian award.

On 13 April 1942, he married Sarala, the daughter of activist and writer Brijlal Biyani, after having been introduced to each other by Jamnalal Bajaj and Mahatma Gandhi in 1941. They had a son, Aditya Vikram Birla and two daughters, Jayashree Mohta and Manjushree Khaitan.

Birla died on 3 July 2019, at the age of 98.

== Philanthropy ==
He was the chairman of the Krishnarpan Charity Trust, which runs an engineering college named BK Birla Institute of Engineering & Technology in Pilani, Rajasthan, the Swargashram Trust, which administers a Sanskrit school in Rishikesh. He also established Birla Public School in Pilani, India and Doha, Qatar and the Birla College of Arts, Science & Commerce in Kalyan near Mumbai. He is the author of several books, including an autobiography entitled Svantah Sukhaya. BK Birla also founded the Ashoka Hall group of schools in Kolkata under the aegis of whom they have 3 schools- Ashoka Hall, Mahadevi Birla Shishu Vihar and G.D.Birla centre of education. He also helped found the Birla Institute of Management Technology (BIMTECH)

== See also ==
- Birla Family
- B K Birla Centre For Education
