= Kumar Mangalam Birla =

Indian industrialist

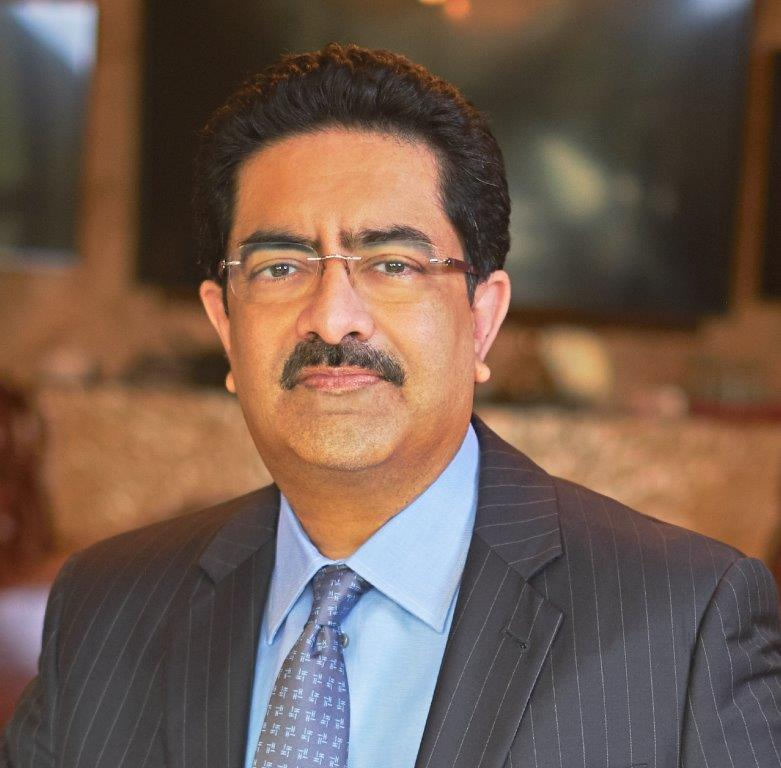
- Birla in 2013
- Born: 14 June 1967 (age 59); Calcutta (now Kolkata), West Bengal, India
- Education: University of Mumbai (BCom); Chartered Accountant; London Business School (MBA)
- Title: Chairman of Aditya Birla Group
- Spouse: Neerja Birla (m. 1989)
- Children: 3 (including Ananya)
- Parent(s): Aditya Vikram Birla and Rajashree Birla
- Relatives: See Birla family
- Awards: Padma Bhushan (2023)

Kumar Mangalam Birla (born 14 June 1967) is an Indian billionaire businessman. He is the chairman of the Aditya Birla Group, one of the largest conglomerates in India. He is the chancellor of the Birla Institute of Technology & Science, Pilani and former chairman of Indian Institute of Management Ahmedabad. In 2023, Birla received the Padma Bhushan, the third highest civilian honour in India.

As of August 2026, Forbes estimated his net worth at US$24 billion.

Born to Aditya Vikram Birla, the eldest of two children, he took over as chairman of the Aditya Birla Group in 1995, at the age of 28, following the death of his father. During Birla's tenure as chairman, the group's annual turnover increased from US$2 billion in 1995 to US$70 billion as of August 2026, with operations in 40 countries.

== Early life and education ==
A fourth generation member of the Birla Family from Pilani, Jhunjhunu, Rajasthan, Birla was born in Kolkata and grew up in a joint family in Mumbai with his parents Aditya Vikram Birla and Rajashree Birla and younger sister Vasavadatta Birla. He is the descendent of the adopted son (Baldeo Das Birla) of wealthy opium trader Shiv Narayan Birla in the late 19th century. He did his high school from Sydenham College of Commerce and Economics and a bachelor's degree from H.R. College of Commerce and Economics of the University of Mumbai. He later studied at London Business School and obtained Master of Business Administration from University of London in 1992. He is also an honorary fellow at LBS. He is a chartered accountant from Institute of Chartered Accountants of India (ICAI).

=== Family and children ===
In January 2023, Birla's children, Ananya Birla and Aryaman Vikram Birla, were appointed as Directors of Grasim Industries, Hindalco Industries, and Aditya Birla Management Corporation Private Limited (ABMCPL), and joined the board of Aditya Birla Fashion and Retail Limited (ABFRL).

== Career ==
=== 1995–2015 ===
In 1995, Birla took over the family business and consolidated all the group companies under the brand – Aditya Birla Group (ABG). Birla acquired Indian Aluminum Company (INDAL) in 2000. In 2003, Hindalco Industries acquired Nifty Copper Mines in Australia, while the Aditya Birla Group acquired the Mount Gordon Copper mines in Australia. In 2004, Birla acquired a majority stake in L&T Cement, which was later renamed UltraTech Cement. In the same year, Hindalco Industries announced a merger with all the businesses of Indian Aluminium Company (Indal).

In 2007, Hindalco acquired Atlanta-based Novelis Inc, which was the world's leading producer of aluminium rolled products. In 2012, Birla's Aditya Birla Nuvo Ltd acquired Future Group's Pantaloon Retail Limited in India. In 2013, Aditya Birla Chemicals acquired the chlor-alkali and phosphoric acid divisions of Solaris Chemtech Industries in India.

Birla's name surfaced in Indian coal allocation scandal, pertaining to the allocation of coal blocks between 2004 and 2009. In 2014, CBI filed closure report against Birla. Since 2015, the Aditya Birla Group consolidated its branded apparel business under its lifestyle retail firm Pantaloons Fashion and Retail India Ltd and renamed it as Aditya Birla Fashion & Retail, creating India's largest branded clothing company by revenue and number of sales outlets.

=== 2016–present ===
By 2016, Birla launched a new logo for the Aditya Birla Group. In June 2017, UltraTech Cement, chaired by Birla, completed the acquisition of Jaiprakash Associates' six cement plants along with five grinding units. In the same year, Birla revived Applause Entertainment, a media, content and IP creation studio with a focus on creating premium digital drama series.

In 2018, the Aditya Birla Group-owned Idea Cellular merged with Vodafone India to create India's then largest telecom service provider, Vodafone Idea. Also in 2018, UltraTech Cement acquired the cement business of Century Textiles, while Binani Cement became a wholly owned subsidiary of UltraTech Cement. In 2018, Novelis entered into an agreement to acquire Aleris Corporation. The deal was closed for $2.8 billion in 2020.

In 2021, Grasim Industries entered the paints business with an investment of ₹₹10,000 crore, paid over three years. In August 2021, Birla stepped down as the non-executive chairman of Vodafone Idea.

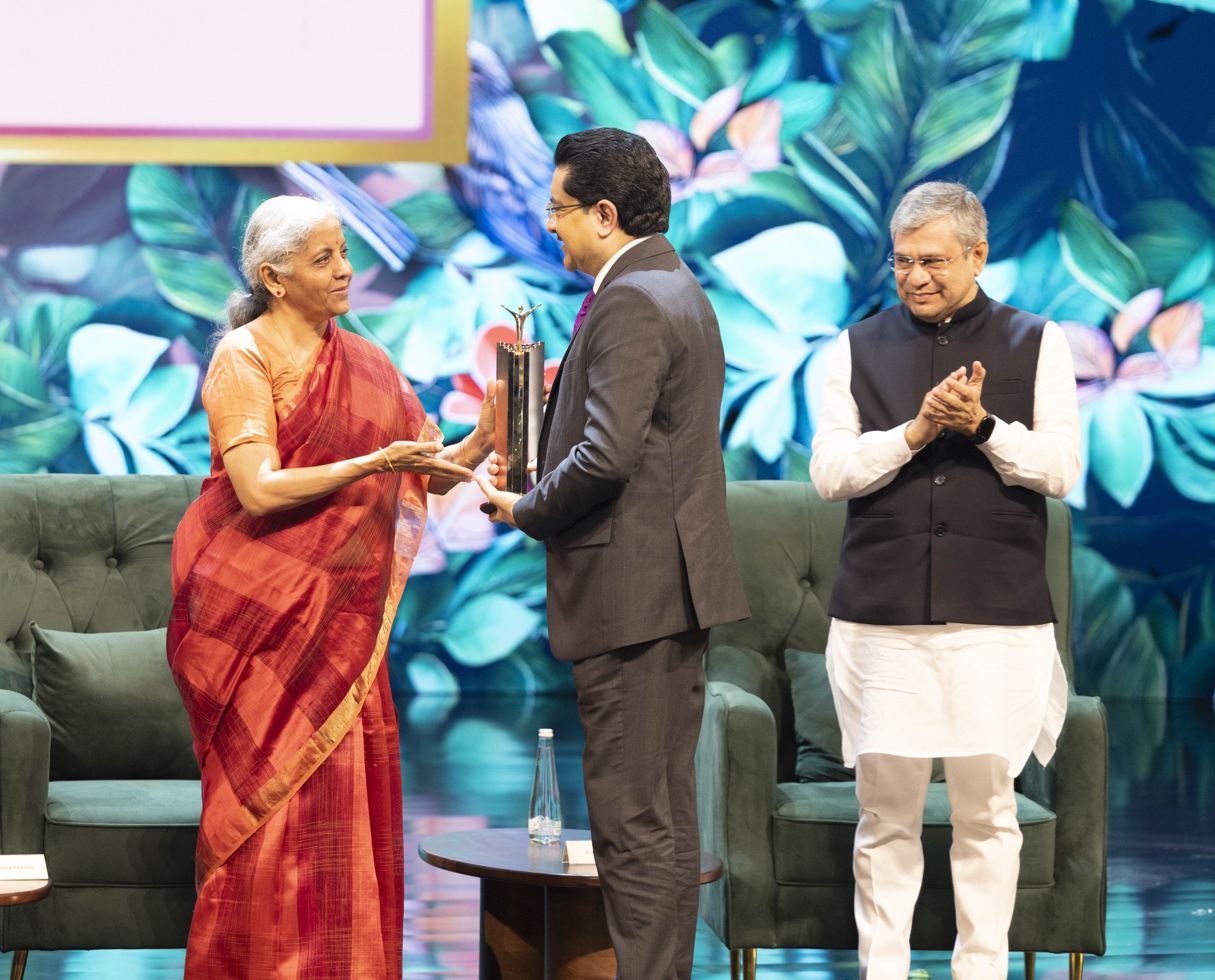
Birla receiving the ET Business Leader of the Year Award from Finance Minister Nirmala Sitharaman

Under Birla's chairmanship, UltraTech Cement announced plans to expand its grey cement production capacity to 200 million tonnes per annum (MTPA) with an investment of ₹32,400 crore. In November 2023, he oversaw the acquisition of Kesoram Industries' cement assets for ₹7,600 crore. By the end of 2023, UltraTech had increased its production capacity by 18.7 MTPA, with an additional 35.5 MTPA in a planned manner across 16 locations. In April 2024, two new greenfield projects were commissioned, adding 5.4 MTPA in Chhattisgarh and Tamil Nadu. By April 2024, UltraTech's total grey cement manufacturing capacity had reached 151.6 MTPA.

In July 2024, Aditya Birla Group launched its jewellery brand Indriya with an investment of ₹5,000 crore.

== Board memberships and affiliations ==
- Chairman, Aditya Birla Group
- Chancellor, BITS Pilani, Hyderabad, Goa and Dubai.
- Chairman, Governing Council, The BITS School of Management (BITSoM).
- Chairman, Board of Governors, BITS Law School, Mumbai (BITSLAW).
- Chairman, Shree Krishnarpan Charity Trust, which manages educational institutions including Birla Technical Training Institute (BTTI), Pilani, and B. K. Birla Institute of Engineering & Technology (BKBIET), Pilani.
- Member, Asia Pacific Advisory Board, London Business School (LBS).
- Chairman, Rhodes India Scholarship Committee for Oxford University, England.
- Director, G. D. Birla Medical Research and Education Foundation.
- Former Chairman, Indian Institute of Management, Ahmedabad.
- Former Chairman, IIT Delhi.
- Former Director, Central Board of Directors, Reserve Bank of India.
- Former Chairman, Advisory Committee, Ministry of Company Affairs.
- Former Chairman, Securities and Exchange Board of India (SEBI) Committee on Corporate Governance.
- Former Chairman, Board of Trade, Ministry of Commerce & Industry.
- Former Chairman, SEBI's Committee on Insider Trading.
- Former Convener, PM's Task Force on Administrative and Legal Simplifications.
- Former Member, Prime Minister of India's Advisory Council on Trade and Industry.

== Honors and awards ==
Year	Name	Awarding Organisation	Ref.
2001	Outstanding Business Man of the Year	National HRD Network	
2003	The Business Leader of the Year	The Economic Times	
2003	Business Man of the Year	Business India	
2004	Young Global Leader	World Economic Forum (Davos)	
2004	Doctor of Literature (Honoris causa)	Banaras Hindu University	
2005	Ernst & Young Entrepreneur of the Year – India	Ernst & Young	
2007	Global Indian Leader of the Year	NDTV	
2008	JRD Tata Corporate Leadership Award	AIMA	
2008	Doctor of Literature	SRM University	
2011	GQ Business Leader of the Year	Condé Nast India Pvt. Ltd.	
2012	Entrepreneur of the Year	Forbes India Leadership Award (FILA)	
2012	Most Inspiring Leader	NDTV	
2012	Business Leader for Taking India Abroad	CNBCTV18	
2012	Global Business Leader Award	NASSCOM	
2012	Doctor of Science (Honoris Causa)	Visvesvaraya Technological University	
2013	The Business Leader of the Year	The Economic Times	
2013	Positioned the fourth Most Powerful CEO	Economic Times' Corporate India's Definitive Power posting of 100 CEOs	
2014	Inducted as an Honorary Member	Rotary Club of Mumbai	
2016	CEO of the Year	International Advertising Association	
2017	Outstanding Businessman of the Year	CNBC-TV18 – IBLA	
2017	The GIL Visionary Leadership Award	Frost & Sullivan	
2019	Global Asian Award	ABLF	
2021	Global Entrepreneur of the Year' in business transformation	The Indus Entrepreneurs (TiE)	
2023	Padma Bhushan	Government of India	
2023	Business Leader of the Decade Award	All India Management Association (AIMA)	
2024	ET Business Leader of the Year Award	The Economic Times	
2025	Doctor of Science, Economics (Honoris causa)	University of London	

== Philanthropy ==
The Aditya Birla Scholarship Programme was founded in 1999 by Kumar Mangalam Birla in memory of his father, Aditya Vikram Birla, to provide financial support to students in engineering, management, and law.

In 2006, Kumar Mangalam Birla established the Aditya Birla Memorial Hospital in Pune, Maharashtra.

As per the EdelGive Hurun India Philanthropy List 2021, Kumar Mangalam Birla and his family ranked fourth on the philanthropy list with donations mostly to the healthcare sector. In 2020, the Aditya Birla Group contributed ₹500 crore towards COVID relief measures, including ₹400 crore to the PM CARES Fund.

Birla created a £15 million endowed scholarship programme to support 10 full-time MBA candidates every year at the London Business School. The BK Birla Scholars Programme, named after Birla's late grandfather Basant Kumar Birla, is the largest endowed scholarship gift to a European business school.

The Birla family has built schools and temples around the India, including BITS Pilani and Birla Mandirs.

== See also ==
- List of billionaires
- List of University of London people
- Indian coal allocation scam
