= G. D. Birla =

Indian businessman (1894-1983)

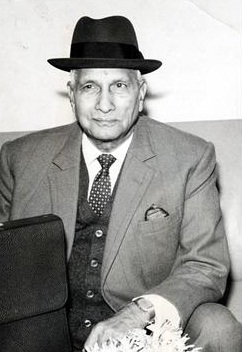
- Birla in September 1980
- Born: 2 April 1894; Pilani, Rajputana Agency, British India
- Died: 11 June 1983 (aged 89)
- Spouses: Durga Devi; Mahadevi Birla
- Children: Lakshmi Nivas Birla; Krishna Kumar Birla; Basant Kumar Birla
- Father: Baldeo Das Birla
- Relatives: see Birla family

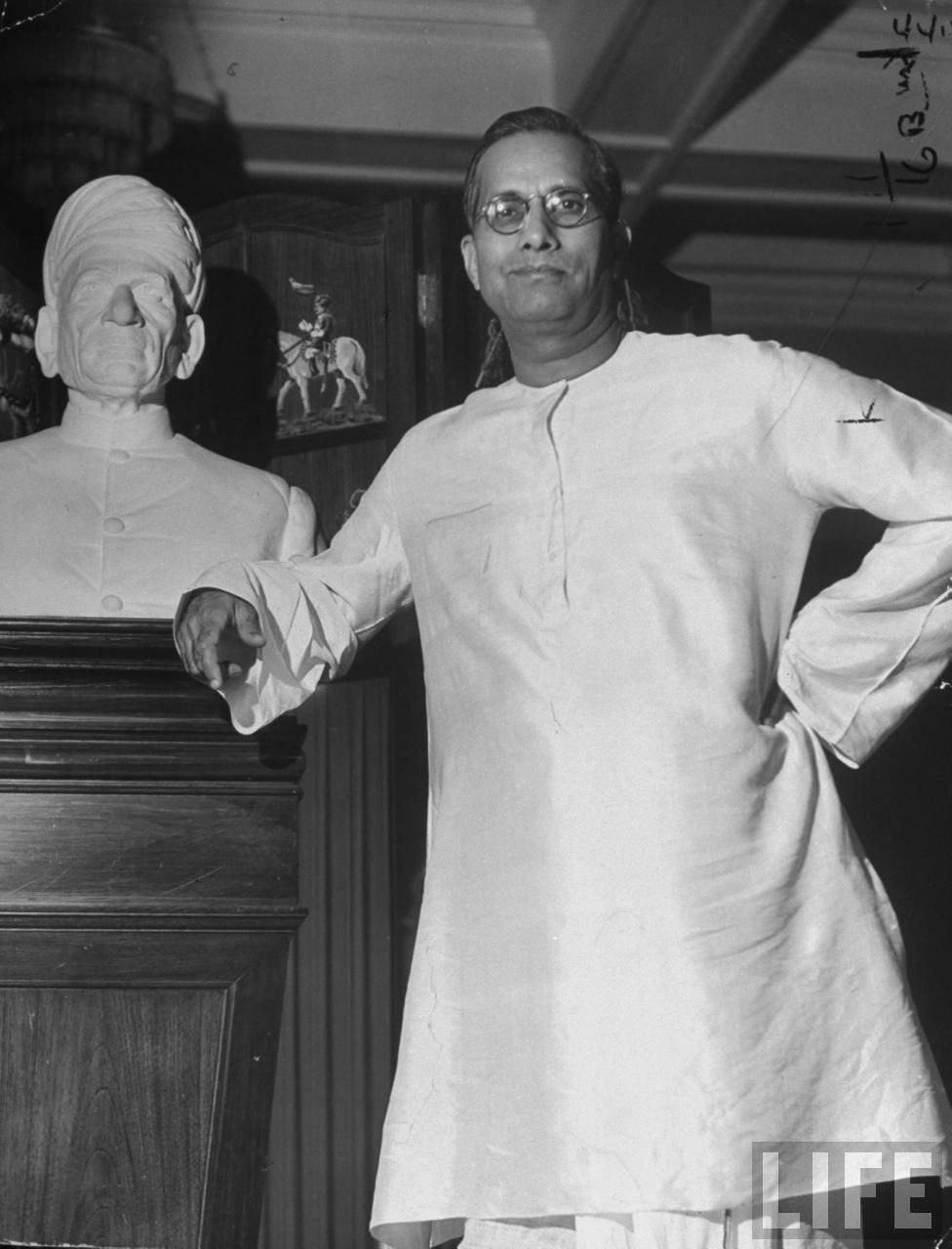
G. D. Birla in 1946

Ghanshyam Das Birla (2 April 1894 – 11 June 1983) was an Indian businessman and member of the Birla Family.

== Birla family history ==
Ghanshyam Das Birla was born on 10 April 1894 at Pilani town in Jhunjhunu district, in the region known as Rajputana, as a member of the Marwari Rajasthani community. His father was Raja Baldevdas Birla. In 1884, Baldeo Das Birla went to Bombay in search of new avenues of trade. He established his firm Shiv Narian Baldeo Das in Bombay in 1884 and Baldeo Das Jugal Kishore in 1897 in Calcutta. The firms started business in silver, cotton, grain and other commodities. He was succeeded by 4 sons, Jugal Kishore, Rameshwar Das, Ghanshyam Das and Braj Mohan. Ghanshyam Das was the most successful of the four brothers.

== Business of Birla family ==
G. D. Birla inherited the family business and moved to further diversify them into other areas. Of these, at least three contemporary family business groups in India can trace their ancestry to him. Of these businesses, he wanted to turn the moneylending business into manufacturing. So he left for Calcutta in Bengal Presidency, the world's largest jute producing region. There, he began "independently as a jute broker". In 1918, he established Birla Jute Mills, much to the consternation of established European merchants, whom the biased policies of the British government favoured over than the local Bengali merchants. He had to overcome a number of obstacles as the British and Scottish merchants tried to shut his business, but he was able to persevere. When World War I resulted in supply constraints throughout the British Empire, Birla's business skyrocketed.

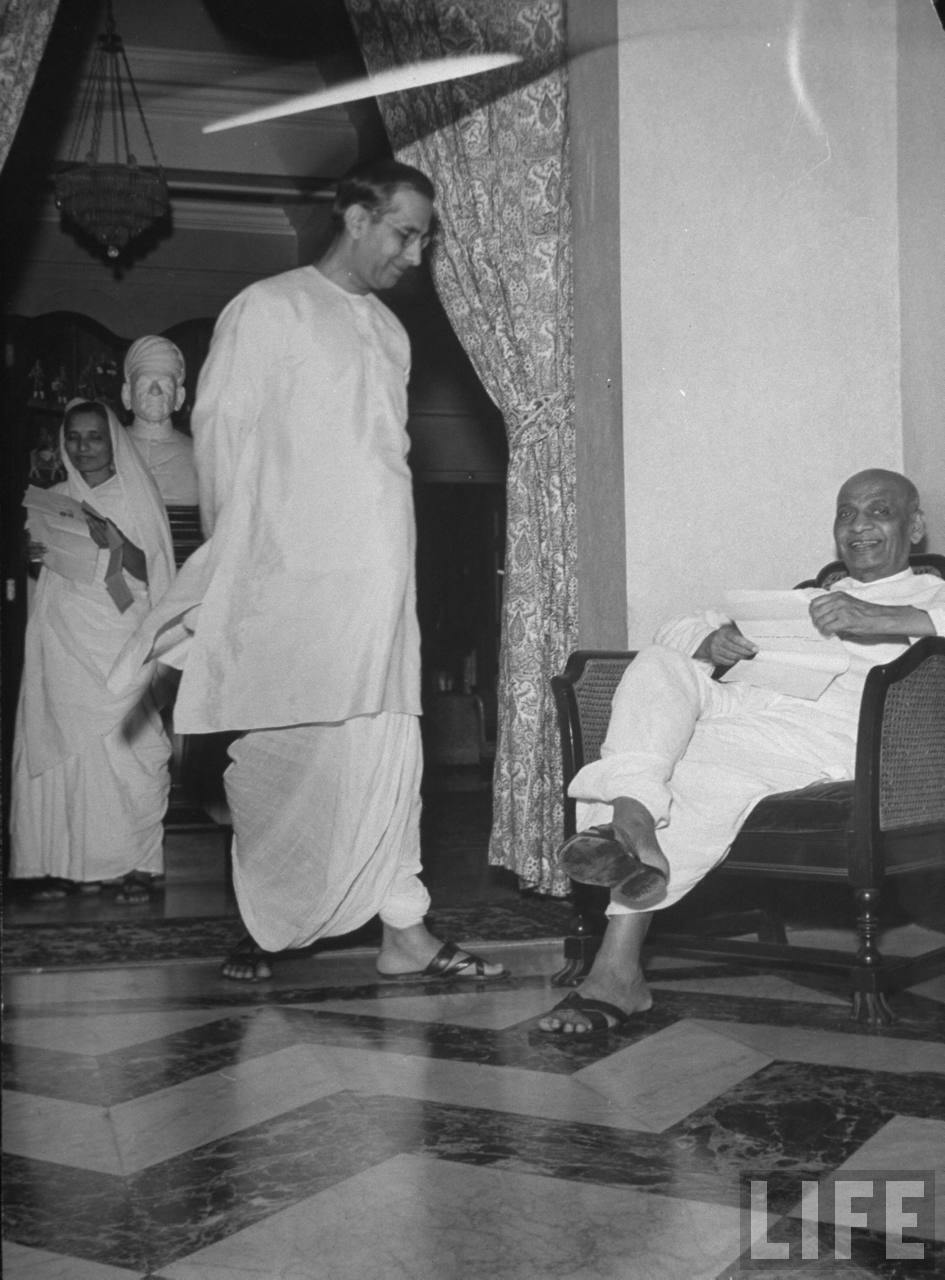
G. D. Birla with Vallabhbhai Patel, and Patel's daughter in the background, at Birla's residence, 1946. The statue is of Raja Baldeo Das Birla in Rajasthani turban

With an investment of ₹5 million in 1919, the Birla Brothers Limited was formed. A mill was set up in Gwalior in the same year.

In 1926, he was elected to the Central Legislative Assembly of British India. He became the first president of Harijan Sevak Sangh founded by Mahatma Gandhi in Delhi in 1932.

In the 1940s, he ventured into the territory of cars and established Hindustan Motors. After independence, Birla invested in tea and textiles through a series of acquisitions of erstwhile European companies. He also expanded and diversified into cement, chemicals, rayon and steel tubes. Ghanshyam Das Birla during the Quit India Movement of 1942, had conceived the idea of organising a commercial bank with Indian capital and management, and the United Commercial Bank Limited was incorporated to give shape to that idea. UCO Bank, formerly United Commercial Bank, established in 1943 in Kolkata, is one of the oldest and major commercial banks of India.

== Philanthropy ==
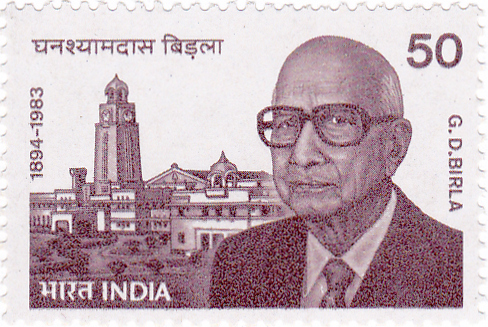
Birla on a 1984 stamp of India

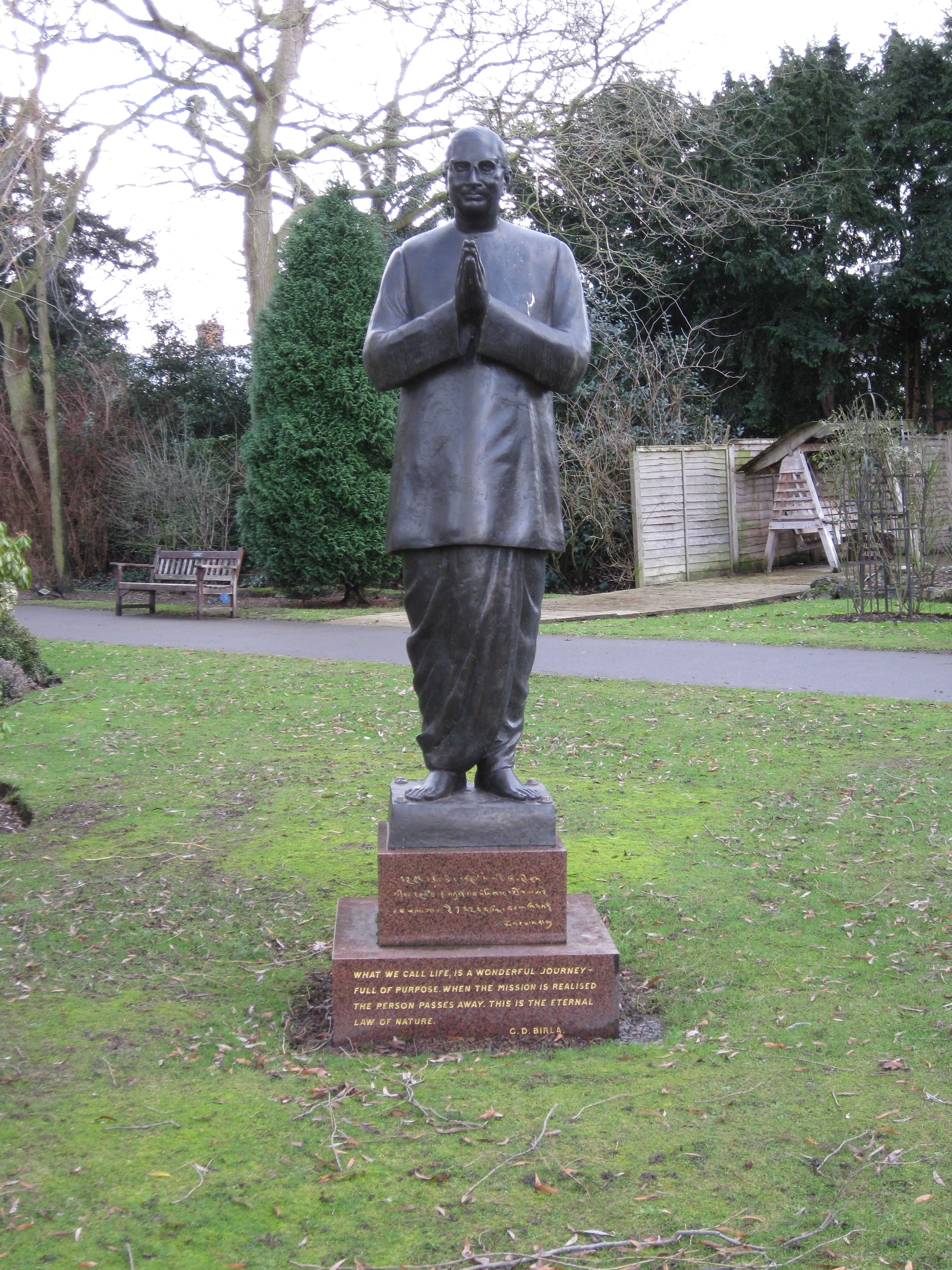
The statue of Ghanshyam Das Birla at Golders Green Crematorium

Envisioning infrastructural development in his hometown, Birla founded the Birla Engineering College (rechristened as Birla Institute of Technology and Science in 1964) in Pilani and the Technological Institute of Textile & Sciences in Bhiwani among other educational institutions in 1943. Now Pilani also houses Birla Public School, a famous residential public school named after Birla's family and a number of polytechnic colleges. The town of Pilani and the local population enjoy a highly symbiotic relationship with these institutions, thereby stepping towards realising Birla's dream. TIT&S also evolved as the Center of Excellence in Textile based education and training. Moreover, G.D. Birla Memorial School, Ranikhet, a premier residential school has also been established in his honour by his son B.K. Birla and The Birla School in Kalyan, India was founded by his efforts with the collaboration of Kalyan Citizens' Education Society (KCES).

In 1957, he was awarded India's second-highest civilian honour, the Padma Vibhushan by the Government of India.

Birla was a vegetarian. He died in London on 11 June 1983 at the age of 89. There is a memorial to him in Golders Green Crematorium, Hoop Lane, London. It comprises a large statue overlooking the gardens with an inscription.

== Relationship with Mahatma Gandhi ==
Birla was a close associate and a steady supporter of Mahatma Gandhi, whom he met for the first time in 1916. Gandhi stayed at Birla's home in New Delhi during the last four months of his life.

== Role during the Bengal famine ==
The Bengal famine of 1943 was a devastating event that resulted in the deaths of an estimated 2-3 million people in the Bengal region of British India (present-day Bangladesh and West Bengal). The famine was caused by a complex interplay of factors, including wartime policies, economic mismanagement, and food distribution failures, rather than a significant crop shortage.

During this crisis, prominent industrialists like GD Birla played a controversial role. According to Janam Mukherjee's Hungry Bengal, Birla and other industrialists like Benthall and Nalini Ranjan Sarkar actively purchased large quantities of rice from rural Bengal at inflated prices. This ensured a steady food supply for their industrial interests in Calcutta, even as millions in rural areas faced starvation. These actions contributed to escalating food prices and exacerbated the food scarcity in rural areas. The industrialists' close ties to the colonial government, with Sarkar holding the Food portfolio and Benthall controlling war transport, allowed them to prioritize feeding industrial Calcutta at the expense of the rural population. Birla reportedly used the profits generated during this crisis to purchase British industrial interests in India following independence, further consolidating his economic influence in the post-colonial era. This stark contrast between the industrialists' actions and Gandhi's public stance on fasting for the "privations of the poor millions" highlights the complex and often conflicting interests at play during this tragic period in Bengal's history.

== Legacy ==
G. D. Birla had remarried after the death of his first wife. He had three sons, Lakshmi Nivas (son of his first wife Durga Devi), Krishna Kumar and Basant Kumar, (both sons of his second wife Mahadevi Birla). Kumar Mangalam Birla is his great grandson. Lakshmi Nivas was technically adopted by his older brother Jugal Kishor.

== Writings by Ghanshyam Das Birla ==
His writings are mainly collections of memoirs, letters, essays and lectures.

- डायरी के कुछ पन्ने (Diary Ke Kuch Panne or Some pages of diary), 1940
- रुपए की कहानी (Rupaye Ki Kahani or Story of Rupee), 1948
- बापू (Bapu), 1941
- कुछ देखा कुछ सुना (Kuch Dekha Kuch Suna or Saw Something Heard Something), 1966
- जमनालाल बजाज (Jamnalal Bajaj)
- ध्रुवोपाख्यान, 1960
- रूप और स्वरूप : चार विचार-प्रेरक निबंध, 1960
- Paths to Prosperity, 1950
- In the Shadow of the Mahatma: a personal memoir (Calcutta, 1953)
