= Pilani =

- Town
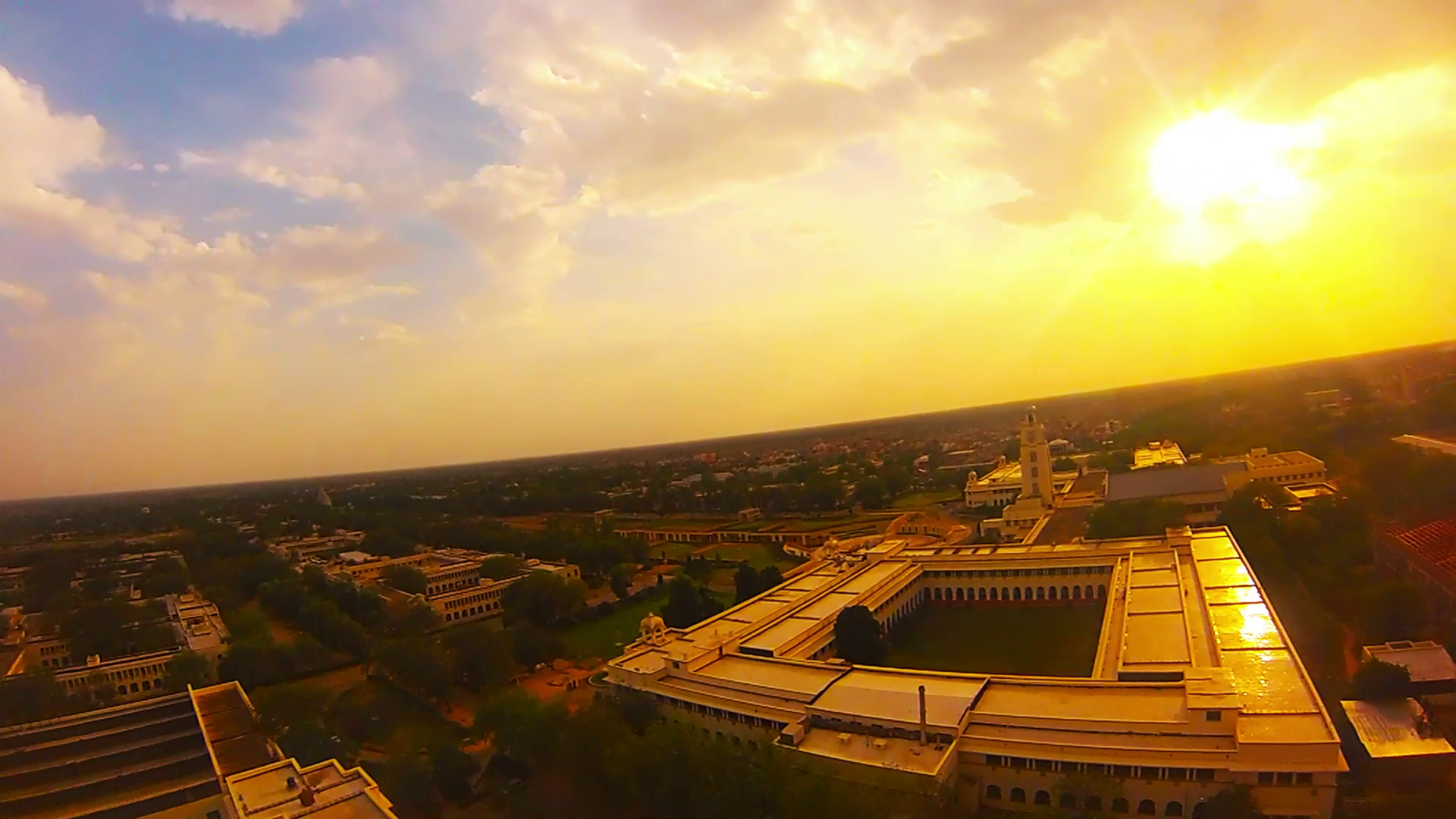
- Aerial view of BITS Pilani campus in Pilani

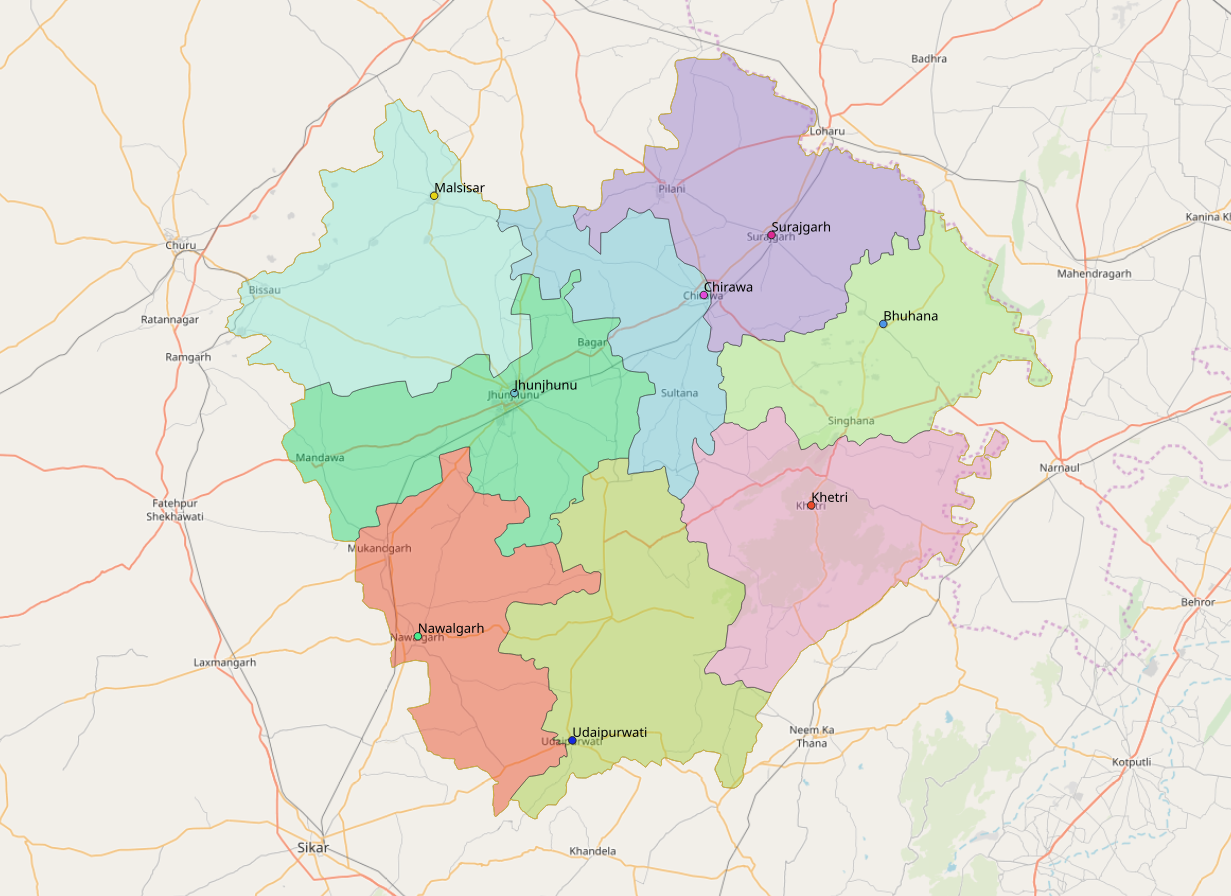
- Location within Jhunjhunu District Location within Rajasthan
- Coordinates: 28.37°N 75.6°E
- Country: India
- State: Rajasthan
- District: Jhunjhunu
- Language: Rajasthani & Hindi
- Elevation: 279 m (915 ft)

Population (2011)
  - Total: 40,590
- Time zone: UTC+5:30 (IST)
- PIN: 333 031
- Telephone code: 91-1596
- Vehicle registration: RJ18

Pilani is a town located in the Jhunjhunu district of Rajasthan, India. The town is best known as the location of BITS Pilani and the birthplace of G. D. Birla.

== Demographics ==
As of the 2011 census of India, Pilani has a population of 29,741 of which 51% are males and 49% females. The average literacy rate is 72%. Male literacy is 80% and female 63%. 12% of the population is under 6 years of age.

== Geography ==
=== Climate ===
Pilani has a semi-arid climate, typical of North Western India. Summers, which last from late March till the end of June are extremely hot and dry. They are followed by the monsoon months of July, August and early September, where temperatures drop slightly, and the humidity rises sharply. The months from late October to early March see warm days, and cool to chilly nights, with very dry conditions. Pilani encounters regular dust storms during the summer season, often leading to power outages.

Climate data for Pilani (1991–2020, extremes 1958–present)
Month	Jan	Feb	Mar	Apr	May	Jun	Jul	Aug	Sep	Oct	Nov	Dec	Year
Record high °C (°F)	31.8 (89.2)	35.1 (95.2)	44.8 (112.6)	47.1 (116.8)	47.7 (117.9)	46.9 (116.4)	45.7 (114.3)	42.6 (108.7)	41.5 (106.7)	40.4 (104.7)	37.8 (100.0)	31.9 (89.4)	47.7 (117.9)
Mean daily maximum °C (°F)	21.0 (69.8)	24.7 (76.5)	31.0 (87.8)	37.2 (99.0)	40.9 (105.6)	39.8 (103.6)	36.6 (97.9)	35.0 (95.0)	35.3 (95.5)	34.5 (94.1)	29.6 (85.3)	24.5 (76.1)	32.4 (90.3)
Mean daily minimum °C (°F)	5.5 (41.9)	8.9 (48.0)	13.8 (56.8)	19.6 (67.3)	24.8 (76.6)	26.9 (80.4)	26.6 (79.9)	25.4 (77.7)	23.0 (73.4)	17.6 (63.7)	11.4 (52.5)	6.7 (44.1)	17.3 (63.1)
Record low °C (°F)	−3.9 (25.0)	−4.0 (24.8)	3.8 (38.8)	8.5 (47.3)	13.5 (56.3)	17.4 (63.3)	18.3 (64.9)	19.0 (66.2)	13.7 (56.7)	9.0 (48.2)	1.8 (35.2)	−2.7 (27.1)	−4.0 (24.8)
Average rainfall mm (inches)	6.6 (0.26)	11.7 (0.46)	9.9 (0.39)	7.4 (0.29)	26.7 (1.05)	67.6 (2.66)	133.1 (5.24)	118.2 (4.65)	60.3 (2.37)	8.6 (0.34)	3.7 (0.15)	2.1 (0.08)	456.0 (17.95)
Average rainy days	0.7	1.4	0.9	0.9	2.4	4.2	6.7	5.8	3.4	0.8	0.4	0.3	27.8
Average relative humidity (%) (at 17:30 IST)	52	45	37	27	28	40	58	64	56	40	43	50	45
Source: India Meteorological Department

== Education and research ==
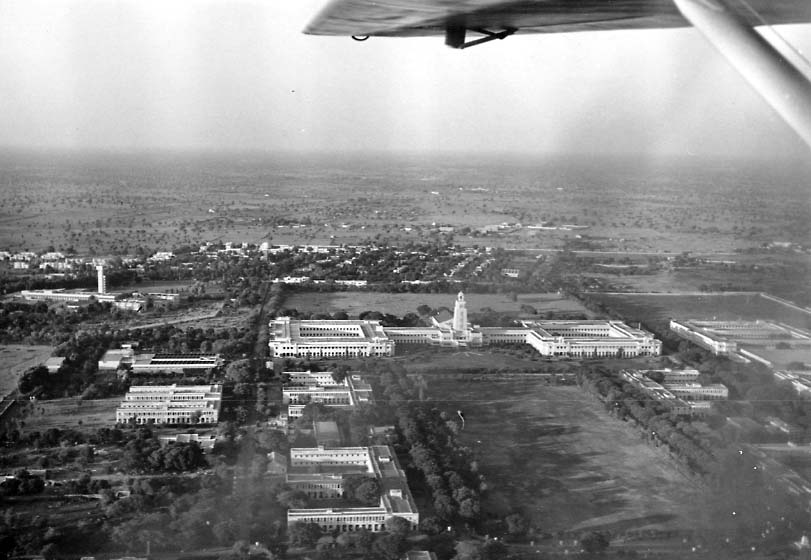
Pilani in 1979

Pilani is home to the Birla Institute of Technology and Science (BITS Pilani).

Apart from BITS, Pilani also has one of the major CSIR labs for advanced research in electronics, the Central Electronics Engineering Research Institute (CEERI), which is located next to the BITS campus. Other colleges include the BK Birla Institute of Engineering & Technology (BKBIET), B K Birla Institute of Higher Education (BKBIHE) is a co-educational college located in Pilani, offering undergraduate programmes such as B.A., BBA, B.Com., and B.Sc., the Indermani Mandelia college for girls, GD Birla Memorial Polytechnic Institute. Schools include Birla Shishu Vihar, Birla High School, Birla Public School and Birla Balika Vidyapeeth.

== Transportation ==
Pilani is not directly accessible by rail; the nearest stations are Chirawa, 16 kilometres (9.9 mi), Sadulpur 40 kilometres (25 mi) away served by the Northern Western Railway on the Sikar-Loharu Broad Gauge section and Loharu, 23.5 kilometres (14.6 mi) away in Haryana, which is served by fully broad gauge sections. Pilani is 208 kilometres (129 mi) from Jaipur and 194.3 kilometres (120.7 mi) from Delhi and has a good bus transport system.
