= Orange Business Services India =

Indian telecommunications company

- Type: Subsidiary
- Industry: Technology consulting Technology services Information and Communication Technology
- Founded: 14 February 2000; 26 years ago
- Parent: Orange Business Services
- Website: Orange India

Orange Business Services India (OBS India) is the Indian operation of Orange Business Services, providing enterprise network and managed services. The Orange brand first entered India on 14 February 2000, when Hutchison Max rebranded its Mumbai mobile service, Max Touch, as Orange. Hutchison Essar discontinued the Orange name for its mobile operations in January 2006.

The brand returned to India in July 2007 as Orange Business Services India, after France Telecom acquired the enterprise network services and managed services business of GTL Ltd. The acquisition gave France Telecom international and national long-distance licences in India, enabling OBS India to provide network and related services to enterprise customers. India also hosts one of Orange Business Services' major global service centres in Gurugram.

== History ==
=== Background of Global ownership of Orange : Before 2000 ===
OBS India traces its presence in India to 1969, when SITA, (Societe Internationale de Telecommunications Aeronautiques), was created to meet the need of the airline industry.

The inception of Orange brand was in 1990 in United Kingdom with the formation of "Microtel Communications Ltd " – a consortium initially formed by Pactel Corporation (American), British Aerospace, Millicom and Matra (French); and later, to be wholly owned by BAe. In July 1991, the Hong Kong–based conglomerate – Hutchison Whampoa through a stock swap deal with BAe, acquired a controlling stake of 65% in Microtel, who by then had won a license to develop a Personal communications network (PCN) in United Kingdom.

Subsequently, Hutchison renamed Microtel to Orange Personal Communications Services Ltd and on 28 April 1994, 'Orange' brand was launched in the UK mobile phone market . A holding company structure was adopted in 1995 with the establishment of Orange plc. In April 1996, Orange went public and floated on the London Stock Exchange and NASDAQ, majority owned by Hutchison (48.22%), followed by BAe (21.1%). In June 1996, it became the youngest company to enter the FTSE 100, valued at £2.4 billion. And by July 1997 Orange had gained one million customers.

The stint as a public company came to an end in October 1999, when it was acquired for US$33 Billion by the German conglomerate – Mannesmann AG. The Mannesmann's acquisition of Orange triggered Vodafone to make a hostile takeover bid for the German company. Shortly thereafter, in February 2000, Vodafone acquired Mannesmann for US$183 Billion and, decides to divest Orange as the EU regulations wouldn't allow it to hold two mobile licences. France Télécom in May 2000, announced the acquisition of the global operations of Orange from Vodafone for US$37 Billion and the transaction was completed in August 2000.

=== Launch of 'Orange' brand in India and its exit : 2000–2006 ===
On 14 February 2000, Hutchison Max – an Indian telecom joint venture majority owned by Hong Kong–based Hutchison Whampoa introduced the brand in the country, through the rebranding of its existing Mumbai telecom circle Cell phone service – 'Max Touch', to 'Orange'. Shortly, issues arose concerning the ownership of the 'Orange' brand in India, when France Telecom who in May 2000 purchased the worldwide rights for the brand from Vodafone made an offer to pick up a significant stake in Hutchison's India operations, in order to own the brand in India. Hutchison turned down the offer, as it had retained the rights over the brand in India through an earlier agreement, but ended up paying royalty to France Telecom. Hutchison Essar ended use of the brand in January 2006.

Orange returned to the country in July 2007, as Orange Business Services India, when France Telecom acquired the enterprise network services and managed services business of GTL Ltd. Since then, OBS India has grown to become one of the country's major data connectivity providers.

France Telecom had earlier entered into a joint venture with BPL Mobile (now Loop) – a rival of Hutchinson Max in Mumbai mobile market; but sold its entire 26% stake in JV in December 2004. Thus, it completely exited from its Indian operations, because of dual brand visibility – competing against its own brand Orange, a business run by Hutchison.

=== Evolution of OBS and return of Orange to India: From 2006 ===
In January 2006, Hutchison Essar (earlier Hutchison Max) ended using Orange brand for its Mumbai operations and started using Hutch brand, which was later acquired by Vodafone in 2007.

With the strategic ambition to become an integrated player in managed data networks and IP-based communication and hosting for global enterprises, France Telecom on 1 June 2006 announced the consolidation of the group's business services operations and rebranded its existing operations of Equant and Wanadoo to a new entity – 'Orange Business Services' (informally, OBS). The rebranding exercise created France Telecom SA's global brand for mobile telephony, as well as all broadband and business connectivity services – 'Orange'.

In July 2007, the brand 'Orange' returned to India as Orange Business Services India, when France Telecom acquired the enterprise network services and managed services business of Navi Mumbai–based network services company, GTL Ltd. Through the acquired business, France Telecom received the International and National Long distance license (ILD NLD) in India, that enabled OBS India to provide full range of network and related services to enterprises in India.

In March 2008, it was reported that Reliance Communications was in advanced talks with France Telecom to bring the Orange brand back to Indian cellular market. However, France Telecom denied any such deal and termed it as market speculation. In 2009, it was reported that Orange may apply for MTNL 3G (Jadoo) franchise deal. FT again discarded this report and commented that they would not like to limit themselves in Delhi & Mumbai.

In 2010, OBS India opened two offices in India – New Delhi and Gurugram, and ever since, it has grown to nine locations, adding Bangalore, Chennai, Hyderabad, Kolkata, Pune, Mumbai and Gandhinagar. It directly employs over 2000 employees. As of June 2012, it has a network with 13 point of presence (PoP) in the country.

India houses one of the OBS's four major global service centres in Gurugram.

== Organisation and operations ==
OBS India traces its presence in India to 1969, when SITA, (Societe Internationale de Telecommunications Aeronautiques), was created to meet the need of the airline industry. It operates in eight locations and employs over 2,000 employees. The locations are – Gurgaon, New Delhi, Kolkata, Mumbai, Chennai, Bangalore, Hyderabad, Gandhinagar and Pune.

The major global service center is located in Gurgaon.

== Case studies ==
The complex merger operations that led to ownership of Orange by France Telecom and its subsequent branding is a subject for numerous management case studies on topics like strategic management, brand management, PEST analysis, financing methods of merger and acquisitions and leveraged buyouts.

== See also ==
- February 2000 launch of brand name "Orange" in India by Hutchison Essar Ltd......
- Orange (telecommunications)
