= Prakash Varma =

Indian filmmaker

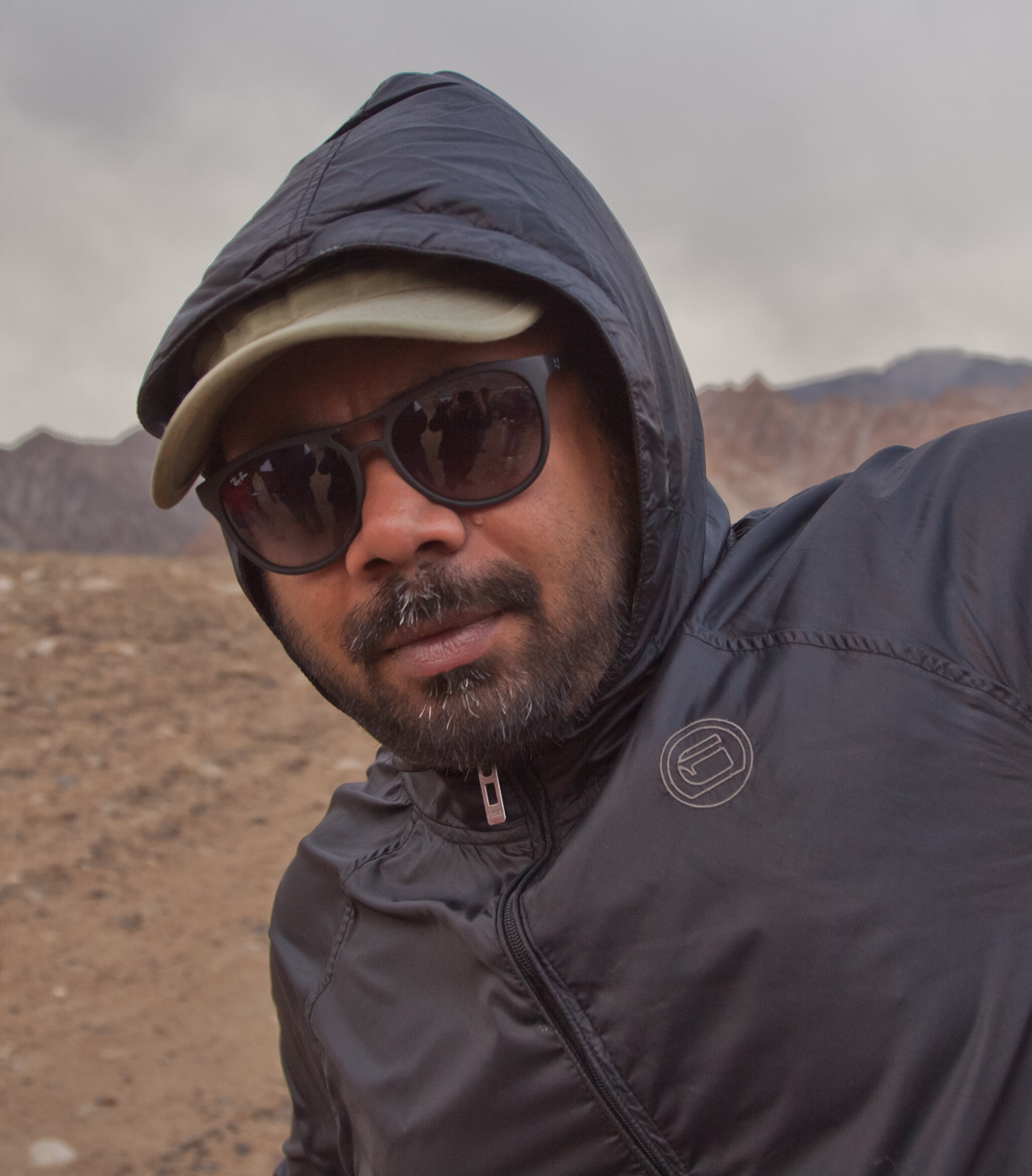
- Varma in 2012
- Born: Alappuzha, Kerala, India
- Education: SD College, Alappuzha
- Occupations: Ad filmmaker; Actor; Producer
- Spouse: Sneha Iype
- Children: 3
- Relatives: Jagannatha Varma (uncle)
- Website: nirvanafilms.com

Prakash Varma is an Indian filmmaker who is known for directing and producing advertisement campaigns. He has directed commercials for Vodafone featuring the ZooZoos, Incredible India, Cadbury and the Indian Railways. Varma is the co-founder of Nirvana Films, a Bangalore-based production company, for which he has directed commercials for Kit Kat, Bisleri, Netflix, Amazon Prime, iPhone, PhonePe and UltraTech Cement. He has also directed campaigns for Kerala Tourism and Dubai Tourism, which featured Shah Rukh Khan.

In 2009, American filmmaker Michael Bay hired Varma to direct commercials for his company The Institute.

Varma debuted as an actor in Mohanlal starrer Thudarum (2025), where he received critical acclaim for his performance.

== Early life ==
Varma was born and brought up in Cherthala Alappuzha, Kerala, India. His father and mother were teachers. He is an alumnus of SDV Central school Alappuzha and SD College, Alappuzha. Varma is nephew to Malayalam film actor Jagannatha Varma. He has four brothers. In an interview, Varma said that he knows his family is related to painter Raja Ravi Varma, but has "no clue how". He worked in Pfizer before pursuing his passion in filmmaking.

== Career ==
After graduation from college, Varma worked as an assistant director to filmmakers A. K. Lohithadas and Viji Thampi. He began his commercial career as an assistant to ad filmmaker V.K. Prakash. After three years of assisting Prakash under the ad company Trends, in 2001, Varma and his wife set up their own production house, Nirvana Films, in Bangalore. The company's first notable ad was for WagonR's Feel at Home series, which won an awards for the best campaign of 2001. He also directed ad for Bajaj XCD 135. His campaign for Hutch featuring a pug was so popular that the price for pugs rose in India. He has also done ad for Airtel. He directed campaigns for Vodafone featuring the characters ZooZoos, sketched by himself. He then went on to make notable ads, including Titan, Hyundai Santro, Chevrolet Optra, Frooti, Lee, Pond's.

In 2009, American filmmaker Michael Bay hired Varma to direct commercials for his company The Institute.

He also directed ads for Cadbury Gems, Cadbury Dairy Milk, Facebook, iPhone, Indian Railways, Kerala Tourism, Rajasthan Tourism, Madhya Pradesh Tourism, West Bengal Tourism, and Incredible India. In 2013, he produced the Malayalam film Ezhu Sundara Rathrikal directed by Lal Jose and also directed a promo song in the film, "Pettidamaarum Aapathil". His ad for Greenply served as the inspiration for Lijo Jose Pellissery's 2022 film Nanpakal Nerathu Mayakkam. In 2025, he made his acting debut with Thudarum, playing CI George Mathan, for which he received widespread critical acclaim.

== Personal life ==
Varma married Sneha Iype, whom he met when the two were working in V. K. Prakash's Trends in Bangalore. The couple has twin sons. In 2001, they founded the production company Nirvana Films. He resides in Whitefield, Bengaluru.

== Filmography ==
Year	Title	Role	Notes
2013	Ezhu Sundara Rathrikal		Producer
2014	Gangster		Opening narrator
2025	Thudarum	George C. Mathan	Acting debut
2026	Law and Order	DSP Balagopal	
