= Thudarum =

2025 film by Tharun Moorthy

- Theatrical release poster
- Directed by: Tharun Moorthy
- Screenplay by: Tharun Moorthy; K. R. Sunil
- Story by: K. R. Sunil
- Produced by: M. Renjith
- Starring: Mohanlal; Shobana; Prakash Varma; Binu Pappu; Farhaan Faasil; Thomas Mathew; Amritha Varshini
- Cinematography: Shaji Kumar
- Edited by: Nishadh Yusuf; Shafeeque V. B.
- Music by: Jakes Bejoy
- Production company: Rejaputhra Visual Media
- Distributed by: Rejaputhra Release; Aashirvad Release
- Release date: 25 April 2025
- Running time: 166 minutes
- Country: India
- Language: Malayalam
- Budget: est.₹28 crore
- Box office: est.₹234–235 crore (Note: Thudarum's reported worldwide grosses vary between ₹234 crore (The Hindustan Times) – ₹235 crore (The Financial Express))

Thudarum (transl. To be continued) is a 2025 Indian Malayalam-language action thriller film directed by Tharun Moorthy, who wrote the screenplay with K. R. Sunil. The film was produced by M. Renjith through Rejaputhra Visual Media. It stars Mohanlal and Shobana, alongside Prakash Varma, Binu Pappu, Farhaan Faasil, Thomas Mathew, Amritha Varshini, Maniyanpilla Raju, Irshad Ali, Aarsha Chandini Baiju, Sangeeth Prathap and Krishna Prabha in supporting roles.

Thudarum was released theatrically on 25 April 2025 to critical acclaim with praise for its performances (particularly of Mohanlal and Prakash Varma), direction, cinematography, editing, music, script, plot and screenplay and emerged as a blockbuster. It is currently the third highest-grossing Malayalam film of 2025 and one of the highest-grossing Malayalam films.

== Plot ==
Shanmugham, known as Benz, is a former stuntman who now lives a quiet life as a taxi driver in Perunad with his wife Lalitha and their children. His peaceful routine is disrupted when his son Pavi and his friends take his prized Ambassador car for a ride and damage it. After a brief conflict with Pavi, Benz leaves the car with a mechanic for repairs and travels to Chennai.

In his absence, the mechanic's assistant uses the car for drug smuggling, leading to its seizure by the police. At the station, Benz is forced by Circle Inspector George Mathan and Sub-inspector Benny Kurian to drive them to a wedding. Later that night, they coerce him into transporting and disposing of a corpse in a remote forest, claiming it was an accidental death involving a colleague's family.

Disturbed by the incident, Benz returns home to find Pavi missing. While searching for him, he discovers a wallet in his car belonging to Pavi and realizes, to his horror, that the body he helped dispose of was his own son. As a landslide later reveals Pavi's body, the police attempt to frame Benz for the murder.

Determined to uncover the truth, Benz abducts a police constable involved in the cover-up and learns that George orchestrated the crime. It is revealed that Pavi had been in a relationship with George's daughter Mary, and George murdered him in an act of so-called “honour,” later using Benz's car to conceal the body.

After escaping police custody, Benz confronts and kills Benny and George. The film ends with Benz being taken to court, asserting his innocence in his son's death, while Mary mourns alongside his family. The closing notes highlight the prevalence and underreporting of honour killings in India.

== Cast ==
- Mohanlal as "Benz" Shanmugham
- Shobana as Lalitha Shanmugham, Benz's wife
- Prakash Varma as CI/DYSP George Mathan, Mary's father; Perunad Police Station
- Binu Pappu as Perunad Police Station SI Benny C. Kurian
- Thomas Mathew as Pavi Shanmugham, Benz's stepson (voice dubbed by Shebin Benson)
  - Master Rudraksh as young Pavi
- Amritha Varshini as Pavithra Shanmugham, Benz's daughter
- Farhaan Faasil as CPO T. K. Sudheesh, Perunad Police Station
- Maniyanpilla Raju as Kuttychan, Benz's friend
- Irshad as Shaji, Benz's friend
- Aarsha Chandini Baiju as Mary Mathan, George's daughter and Pavi's girlfriend
- Sangeeth Prathap as Kiran, Pavi's friend
- Abin Bino as Manikandan C. P. / Maniyan
- Krishna Prabha as Seema, Benz's neighbour
- Shaijo Adimali as Cheeyaachan, Benz's neighbour
- Shobi Thilakan as Maniyan's father
- Bharathiraja as Stunt Master Palani Swamy
- Ilavarasu as Ilavarasu, Benz's friend
- Rani Sarran as Maniyan's mother (voice dubbed by Sminu Sijo)
- Sasankan Mayyanad as auto driver
- G. Suresh Kumar as Judge Thomas Kurian
- Sreejith Ravi as Police Officer from Kottayam Camp
- Nilja K Baby as Sudheesh's sister
- Santhosh Keezhattoor as Pathanamthitta SP Muhammed Yousuf IPS
- Jaise Jose as Police Officer from Kottayam Camp
- J Pallasseri as Hostel Warden
- P. Chandrakumar as Ayyappan pilgrim
- Pradeep Chandran as CPO Sadanandan
- Nishanth Sagar as MLA Nandhalal
- Rajkumar Rajasekharan as Police Officer
- Syamlal as CPO Syam
- Karuna as Shaji's wife
- Chandini Sasikumar as a police officer
- Arjun Ashokan as wedding guest (cameo appearance)
- Nishadh Yusuf as pickup truck driver (cameo appearance)
- Dinesh Prabhakar as man in pickup (cameo appearance)
- Vijay Sethupathi as Anbu, Lalitha's first husband and Pavi's biological father (photo archive)
- Kalpana as George's late wife and Mary's late mother (photo archive)

== Production ==
=== Development ===
The film was officially announced by Mohanlal in mid-March 2024, with Tharun Moorthy set to direct. Moorthy co-wrote the screenplay with K. R. Sunil, while M. Renjith of Rejaputhra Visual Media took on production responsibilities. Filming was planned to begin in April. In an interview, Moorthy revealed that following the success of his previous film, Saudi Vellakka (2022), Renjith expressed interest in collaborating on a new project. Moorthy and Sunil spent eight months developing the screenplay, which was eventually greenlit. The project had the working title L360, marking Mohanlal's 360th film. Although the team had already finalized a title by the time the screenplay was completed, they opted to use a temporary title during production.

Thudarum originated from a story conceptualized by Sunil, a documentary photographer who frequently travels in search of subjects for his works. Sunil revealed that the story was inspired by an encounter during one such journey, involving a person and a sight. Renjith and Sunil approached Moorthy to direct the project, believing he was suitable to handle its "nuanced characters" and "emotional depth". Mohanlal had been attached to the film even before Moorthy's involvement, having expressed interest in the story "a long time ago". Speculation arose linking Thudarum to Benz Vasu, an unrealized project of Mohanlal, written by Sunil with G. Prajith attached as director. Moorthy clarified that Thudarum was a different project developed from scratch based on a character and an event concept presented by the production team. The screenplay was completed after five drafts.

=== Casting ===
Mohanlal plays the character Shanmugham, a taxi driver. Sunil noted that while the character was initially conceived independently of any specific actor, he eventually envisioned Mohanlal in the role as the story progressed. He remarked that Shanmugham embodies the essence of vintage Mohanlal, reminiscent of his characters in the films of Sathyan Anthikad and Kamal. Moorthy described Mohanlal's character as down-to-earth. For the portrayal of Lalitha, the female lead character, Moorthy initially met Jyothika and narrated her the story. Jyothika, who liked the script, agreed to do the film, however due to her unavailability during the shooting period, was later replaced by Shobana. It marked Shobhana's reunion with Mohanlal after a 15-year gap, having previously worked together in numerous films. Prakash Varma, an ad filmmaker who had earlier directed Vodafone's ZooZoo commercials was cast in a significant role. The rest of the cast includes Farhaan Faasil, Maniyanpilla Raju, Binu Pappu, Nandu, Irshad Ali, Aarsha Chandini Baiju, Thomas Mathew, Krishna Praba, and Aravind.

=== Filming ===
Principal photography began on 22 April 2024, with Mohanlal and Shobhana joining on the same day. The film's primary locations were Thodupuzha and Ranni. The initial phase of filming took place in Kaloor East, Thodupuzha. After 70 days of shooting, the production paused for a scheduled break on 5 July. Filming was set to resume once Mohanlal completed his commitments on L2: Empuraan (2025), with approximately 20–25 days of work for Thudarum still pending. Reports suggested that a brief second schedule would commence in the first week of August, lasting 10 days. This phase concluded by the end of the month.

Some scenes were modified during the filming process. The final schedule started in October in Chennai. Renjith mentioned that crucial scenes were being filmed in Chennai over three days, followed by a week-long shoot in Walayar, and then in the Cumbum and Theni regions, with plans to conclude in Thodupuzha. Moorthy added that this phase also includes filming in Ranni and Vagamon. Mohanlal joined the team in Chennai and was later spotted filming in Theni. The production wrapped up in Thodupuzha on 1 November 2024, after a total of 99 shooting days. The film's title was announced later that month.

=== Post-production ===
Mohanlal finished his dubbing in November 2024. After the death of editor Nishadh Yusuf, Shafeeque V. B. took over the editing, with both of them receiving the credits.

== Music ==
The film's music and background score is composed by Jakes Bejoy. The first single titled "Kanmanipoove" was released on 21 February 2025. The second single titled "Kadha Thudarum" was released on 21 March 2025. The soundtrack album was released through Sony Music India on 11 April 2025.

== Release ==
=== Theatrical ===
Thudarum was first scheduled for a release in theatres on 30 January 2025. The date was then revised to 25 April 2025. Thudarum did receive a U/A 16+ certificate for strong bloody violence, threat, sexual abusive behavior and domestic abuse. The Telugu dub was released on the next day with the same title. The Tamil dubbed version titled as Thodarum, was released on 9 May 2025.

=== Home media ===
The film's digital streaming rights were acquired by JioHotstar. The film began streaming on JioHotstar from 30 May 2025 in Malayalam and dubbed versions of Tamil, Hindi, Telugu and Kannada languages. The satellite rights of the film was acquired by Asianet and the film had its television premiere on 5 September 2025 on the occasion of Onam.

== Reception ==
=== Critical response ===
Thudarum received positive reviews from critics.

Anandu Suresh of The Indian Express gave 4/5 stars and wrote "Tharun Moorthy's Mohanlal and Shobana-starrer ranks among one of the finest Indian revenge thrillers that hasn't compromised on any of its aspects, both on the creative and technical sides, while also ensuring brilliant performances". Pooja Pillai of Eastern Eye wrote that "Mohanlal returns to form in a dark, emotional ride that's winning hearts". S R Praveen of The Hindu wrote, "Thudarum, despite its flaws, is a finely-crafted film with the right emotional beats." Manjusha Radhakrishnan of Gulf News gave 4.5/5 and wrote, "Thudarum comes together as a compelling unit not just because of Mohanlal's restrained brilliance, but also because of its dark, macabre villains."

Arjun Menon of Rediff gave 3.5/5 stars and wrote that "Thudarum is a masterpiece for adults, a serious yet self-aware piece of cinema that has something for everybody". Latha Srinivasan of Hindustan Times gave 3.5/5 starts and wrote "A top-form Mohanlal shines in fan boy Tharun Moorthy's gripping directorial". Vignesh Madhu of The New Indian Express gave 3.5/5 and wrote, " Some minor flaws aside, Tharun Moorthy delivers the goods with this finely-crafted film that has the right mix of emotions and high moments." Sanjith Sidharthan of OTTplay rated 4/5 and wrote, "When the Mohanlal-starrer lands in the suspense thriller territory, there's no holding back. The brilliant casting of Prakash Varma and Binu Pappu further elevates the film"

Anna Mathews of The Times of India gave 3/5 and wrote, "Thudaram lacks nuance in script and acting." Sajin Shrijith of The Week rated 3.5/5 and wrote, " Even during the film's darkest moments, the filmmaker doesn't forget to inject us with much-welcome doses of catharsis." Sanjay Ponappa of India Today gave 3.5/5 and wrote, "Mohanlal's crime drama is good mix of thrills and punches." Cris of News Minute wrote, "Sticking to formula, Thudarum is a well-made film, with every department doing a clean job. Shaji Kumar's cinematography is especially important in a film that dwells, for a good part, in the depths of the woods." Athulya Nambiar of Mid Day wrote, "Shobana brings quiet strength and grace matching Mohanlal's energy frame for frame while Prakash Varma makes a solid acting debut." Princy Alexander of Onmanorama wrote, "Thudarum is Moorthy's fanboy service to the actor as evident in some dialogues which also has references to Mammootty and Rajinikanth."

=== Box office ===
Thudarum collected ₹17.18 crore worldwide on the first day of its release, with ₹5.10 crore from Kerala, ₹90 lakh from ROI and ₹11.18 crore from overseas. The film went on to gross ₹69.25 crore worldwide in the first three-day weekend of its release, to become the 2nd fastest Malayalam film to cross ₹50 crore. It ranked eighth on Comscore's global opening weekend (April 25–27) with a gross over $7.3 million. In its first four-days it grossed ₹82 crore worldwide. The first 4-day Kerala gross was ₹27.20 crore.

The film grossed ₹94.5 crore worldwide in 5 days of its release. It collected ₹105.85 crore in 6 days, hence becoming the second fastest Malayalam film to cross the ₹100 crore mark. The film collected ₹158.85 crore by the second Sunday (10 days) of its release, becoming the 6th Malayalam film to gross over ₹150 crore. In 12 days of theatrical run, the film has grossed ₹175.69 crore worldwide. On its 16th day it grossed ₹3.80 crore approx in Kerala, taking its total to ₹90 crore surpassing 2018 (2023), emerging as the highest grosser at the Kerala box office. In 17 days of run, the film crossed ₹200 crore worldwide. It became the first film to collect ₹100 crore at the Kerala box office reaching the mark on its 19th day. In 24 days, the worldwide gross was ₹222 crore and grossed ₹232 crore worldwide in 34 days. Made on a budget of ₹28 crore, the film grossed ₹234–235 crore worldwide, including ₹93.80 crore gross from overseas and ₹141.50 crore domestic gross, in which ₹118.9 crore gross is from Kerala.

== Accolades ==
=== Malayala Puraskaram 1201 ===
- Best Popular Film – Tharun Moorthy, M. Renjith
- Best Actor – Mohanlal
- Best Newcomer – Prakash Varma
- Best Editor – Nishadh Yusuf (posthumously)

=== Mazhavil Entertainment Awards ===
- Best Film – M. Renjith
- Best Director – Tharun Moorthy
- Entertainer of the Year – Mohanlal
- Best Negative Role – Prakash Varma
- Best Stunt Director – Stunt Silva
- Best On-screen Couple – Mohanlal, Shobana
- Upcoming Star – Binu Pappu
