= Idea Cellular =

Former Indian telecommunications company

Idea Cellular Limited
- Formerly: Birla Communications Limited (1995-1996); Birla AT&T Communications Limited (1996-2001); Birla Tata AT&T Communications Limited (2001-2002)
- Type: Public
- Traded as: BSE: 532822; NSE: IDEA
- ISIN: INE669E01016
- Industry: Telecommunications
- Founded: 1995; 31 years ago
- Founder: Aditya Birla Group
- Defunct: 31 August 2018; 8 years ago (as a company) 7 September 2020; 6 years ago (as a brand)
- Fate: Merged with Vodafone India
- Successor: Vodafone Idea
- Headquarters: Gandhinagar, Gujarat, India
- Area served: India
- Key people: Kumar Mangalam Birla (Chairman); Himanshu Kapania (Managing director)
- Products: Mobile telephony, wireless broadband
- Revenue: ▲₹36,162.54 crore (US$3.8 billion) (2016)
- Operating income: ▲₹12,180.67 crore (US$1.3 billion) (2016)
- Net income: ▲₹2,728.13 crore (US$280 million) (2016)
- Total assets: ▲₹98,577.16 crore (US$10 billion) (2016)
- Total equity: ▲₹27,262.46 crore (US$2.8 billion) (2016)
- Owner: Aditya Birla Group (49.05%); Axiata (19.96%); Providence Equity Partners (10.60%)
- Members: 220.00 million (June 2018)
- Parent: Aditya Birla Group

Idea Cellular Limited was an Indian telecommunications based in Mumbai, Maharashtra. It was an integrated GSM operator and had 220.00 million subscribers as of June 2018.

In 2018 Idea Cellular merged with Vodafone India into Vodafone Idea.

== History ==
Idea Cellular was incorporated as Birla Communications in 1995 after GSM licenses were won in Gujarat and Maharashtra circles. The company name was changed to Idea Cellular and the brand Idea was introduced in 2002 after a series of name changes following mergers and joint ventures with Grasim Industries, AT&T Corporation and Tata Group. Following the exit of AT&T Corporation and Tata Group from the joint venture in 2004 and 2006 respectively, Idea Cellular became a subsidiary of Aditya Birla Group. Malaysia based Axiata had bought around 20% stake in the company in 2008 for US$2 billion.

Idea previously bought a 40.8% stake in Spice Telecom, for over ₹2,700 crore.

=== Merger with Vodafone India ===
The entry of Jio in 2016 had led to various mergers and consolidations in the Indian telecom sector. It was announced in March 2017 that even Idea Cellular and Vodafone India would be merged. The merger got approval from Department of Telecommunications in July 2018. On August 30, 2018, National Company Law Tribunal gave the final nod to the Vodafone-Idea merger The merger was completed on 31 August 2018, and the newly merged entity was named Vodafone Idea. The merger created the largest telecom company in India by subscribers and by revenue. Under the terms of the deal, the Vodafone Group holds a 45.2% stake in the combined entity, the Aditya Birla Group holds 26% and the remaining shares will be held by the public.

On 7 September 2020, Vodafone Idea unveiled this new brand identity, Vi, which involved the integration of the company's erstwhile separate brands Vodafone India and Idea Cellular into one unified brand.

== Operations ==
In the 2010 3G spectrum auction, Idea paid ₹57.68 billion (US$600 million) for spectrum in 11 circles. After the launch of MNP in India, Idea further strengthened its customer base because it was the cellular network with most net port-ins.

=== Radio frequency summary ===
Idea Cellular owned spectrum in 900 MHz, 1800 MHz, 2100 MHz, 2300 MHz and 2500 MHz bands across the country.

Telecom circle coverage	E-GSM 900MHz Band 8	GSM / LTE-FDD 1800MHz Band 3	UMTS 2100MHz Band 1	LTE-TDD 2300MHz Band 40	LTE-TDD 2500MHz Band 41
Delhi	Yes	Yes	Yes	No	Yes
Mumbai	Yes	Yes	Yes	No	Yes
Kolkata	Yes	Yes	Yes	No	Yes
Andhra Pradesh & Telangana	Yes	Yes	Yes	No	Yes
Gujarat	Yes	Yes	Yes	No	Yes
Karnataka	Yes	Yes	Yes	No	No
Maharashtra & Goa	Yes	Yes	Yes	Yes	Yes
Tamil Nadu	Yes	Yes	Yes	No	No
Haryana	Yes	Yes	Yes	No	Yes
Kerala	Yes	Yes	Yes	Yes	Yes
Madhya Pradesh
Punjab	Yes	Yes	Yes	No	Yes
Rajasthan	Yes	Yes	Yes	No	Yes
Uttar Pradesh (East)	Yes	Yes	Yes	No	Yes
Uttar Pradesh (West)	Yes	Yes	Yes	No	Yes
West Bengal	Yes	Yes	Yes	No	Yes
Assam	No	Yes	Yes	No	Yes
Bihar & Jharkhand	No	Yes	Yes	No	Yes
Himachal Pradesh	No	Yes	Yes	No	Yes
Jammu and Kashmir	No	Yes	Yes	No	Yes
North East	No	Yes	Yes	No	Yes
Odisha	Yes	Yes	Yes	No	Yes

Note: The above table contains Vodafone Idea radio frequency details because they used to share their networks with each other via ICR (intra-circle roaming agreement) in some circles. For example, Idea had started giving its customers in Delhi access to 4G services in May 2018 via the Vodafone network.

== See also ==
- Aditya Birla Group
- AT&T Corporation
- Axiata
- Grasim Industries
- Spice Telecom
- Tata Group
- Vodafone Idea
- Vodafone India
