= Manoj G. Tirodkar =

Indian entrepreneur (born 1964)

- Born: 5 October 1964 (age 61); Mumbai, India (now Mumbai)
- Education: SSC from a Marathi-medium school.
- Occupations: Chairman & Managing Director
- Parent(s): Mr. Gajanan Raghunath Tirodkar; Mrs. Snehalata Tirodkar

Manoj G. Tirodkar (born 5 October 1964) is an Indian entrepreneur. He is the founder of the Global Group Enterprises.

Brought up in Mumbai, India, Tirodkar opted out of college to start his own business in the name "Global" (not to be confused with the British "Global Group").

In 2010, Manoj Tirodkar was placed 74th on Forbes list of India's Richest. He is also recipient of several awards and recognitions for his contribution to the telecom industry. He was the first Indian to win the prestigious "World Young Business Achiever Award 2000" (WYBA) presented by Worldcom Group In 2016–17, Manoj Tirodkar was featured in The Economic Times, "Most Promising Business Leaders of Asia".

== Early life ==
Tirodkar was born on 5 October 1964 Mumbai, India to Mr. Gajanan Raghunath Tirodkar and Mrs. Snehalata Tirodkar. Hailing originally from the Sindhudurg region of Maharashtra, India, Tirodkar grew up in a middle-class family. His early education was in a Marathi medium school, Chikitsak Vidyalaya, Girgaum, Mumbai. He didn't follow through with college, instead straight after school he went to Germany as management trainee to explore job opportunities.

== Career ==
At 17, (1981) Manoj Tirodkar started his business career by assisting his father in his shipping agency business. He left that, and founded the Global Group in 1985. It was initially a single subscriber end telecom equipment company which over the years has become Global Group that offers telecom Infrastructure and network services to the Telecom Sector.

Over the years, Global Group has expanded both organically and inorganically through merger and acquisition opportunities that have presented themselves.

Manoj Tirodkar, established Global Group Enterprise, GTL to offer a range of network services including Network Planning & Design, Network Deployment, Network Operations & Maintenance, Infrastructure Management, Energy Management and Professional Services. It was listed in 1992 on the stock exchanges in India. For FY 2016–17, GTL has registered a consolidated income of Rs 1,673.68 Crore (US$249.94 Mn.)

In 1995, Manoj Tirodkar created an Indian IT unicorn, Global Electronic Commerce Services Ltd (Global E-commerce)- a company that operated India's first private sector data network across major cities offering EDI, Email and Enhanced Fax Services among others in the B2B space.

In 1996–97, GTL formed a JV with Broadsystem Multimedia, Australia, to start a Call Management Company in India for Business Process Outsourcing.

Early 2000, Manoj Tirodkar led GTL to become one of the first companies in India to offer enterprise network services and managed services to medium and large corporates in the IT, ITeS, BFSI, Defense and the Hospitality segments.

In 1999, Global E-commerce was monetized and later used its proceeds to create India's first Independent and neutral Telecom Tower Company.

In 2004, having conceptualized a third party independent tower company, Manoj Tirodkar carved GTL Infra out of GTL Ltd. For FY 2016–17, GTL Infra registered revenue of Rs. 2286 crores and EBIDTA of Rs. 1,122 crores.

== Social responsibility ==
Manoj Tirodkar, through Global Foundation, a Public Charitable Trust of the Global Group, has been contributing in the areas of education, health, disability, and community welfare. Over 2,00,000 beneficiaries have availed support from Global Foundation.

Manoj Tirodkar, is an advocate of clean and green environment and through Global Group, has been focusing on reducing the carbon footprint by investing in solutions that improve the energy efficiency in telecom operations.

== Interests ==
Manoj Tirodkar reads regularly. He also enjoys listening to music of all genres. Further, he is an art aficionado, who also enjoys gardening, interior decoration and travelling.

== Awards and recognitions ==
- Manoj Tirodkar was featured as one of the Most "Promising Business Leaders of Asia 2016-17" by The Economic Times
- Fellowship of Institute of Directors (IOD)in 2008
- Manoj Tirodkar received the National Level Entrepreneurship Award from Jagtik Marathi Chambers of Commerce and Industry in 2006
- CII Young Entrepreneur Trophy in 2001
- World Young Business Achievers Award in 2000 (WYBA)
- Indian Young Business Achiever Award in 2000 (IYBA)
- Finalists in the Ernst & Young, "Entrepreneur of the Year" award in 2000
- Manoj Tirodkar received the Telecom Man of the Year award in 1996
