= Vodafone Idea =

Indian telecommunications company

Vodafone Idea Limited
- Trade name: Vi
- Type: Public
- Traded as: BSE: 532822; NSE: IDEA
- ISIN: INE669E01016
- Industry: Telecommunications
- Predecessor: Vodafone India; Idea Cellular
- Founded: 31 August 2018; 8 years ago
- Headquarters: Gandhinagar, India
- Area served: India
- Key people: Ravinder Takkar (Chairman); Abhijit Kishore (CEO); Kumar Mangalam Birla (Non-executive director)
- Products: Mobile telephony; Wireless broadband; Internet
- Revenue: ▲₹45,414 crore (US$4.9 billion) (2026)
- Operating income: ▲₹19,003 crore (US$2.0 billion) (2026)
- Net income: ▲₹34,552 crore (US$3.7 billion) (2026)
- Total assets: ▲₹191,638 crore (US$20 billion) (2026)
- Total equity: ▲₹35,758 crore (US$3.8 billion) (2026)
- Owners: Government of India (49%); Vodafone Group (16.07%); Aditya Birla Group (9.57%); Public float (25.36%)
- Members: 198.82 million (July 2026)
- Number of employees: 19,670 (2026)
- Subsidiaries: YOU Broadband
- Website: myvi.in

Vodafone Idea (d/b/a Vi, pronounced /ˈviː/) is an Indian telecommunications company headquartered in Gandhinagar. It is an all-India integrated GSM operator offering mobile telephony services.

As of July, 2026, Vi has a subscriber base of 198.82 million, making it third largest mobile telecommunications network in India and 12th largest mobile telecommunications network in the world.

Vodafone Idea was created on 31 August 2018 by the merger of Vodafone India and Idea Cellular. On 20 September 2020, the two separate brands Vodafone India and Idea Cellular rebranded as Vodafone Idea (Vi).

== History ==
In March 2017, it was announced that Vodafone India and Idea Cellular would merge. The merger was approved by the Department of Telecommunications in July 2018. On 30 August 2018, National Company Law Tribunal approved the Vodafone-Idea merger. It was completed on 31 August 2018, and the new entity was named Vodafone Idea. Under the terms of the deal, Vodafone Group held a 45.2% stake in the combined entity, the Aditya Birla Group held 26% and the remaining shares were to be held by the public.

Vodafone Idea lost a significant number of gross and active subscribers in the month of August 2020.

Until 7 September 2020, Vodafone Idea operated two separate brands: Vodafone India and Idea Cellular who both operated pre-paid and post-paid GSM service.

On 3 February 2023, the Government of India ordered the company to convert its interest dues worth 161.33 billion Indian Rupees ($1.96 billion) to equity at the rate of 10 rupees per share face value (well over then market value ~8.5), thus making the government 33.1% stake owner and the single biggest shareholder in the company.

In March 2025, the Government of India further raised its stake to 48.99% by acquiring additional shares worth ₹36,950 crore ($4.5 billion).

== Network ==
=== Spectrum frequency holding summary ===
Vodafone Idea owns spectrum in 900 MHz, 1800 MHz, 2100 MHz, 2300 MHz, 2500 MHz, 3500 MHz and 26 GHz bands across India.

Telecom circle coverage	E-GSM/ LTE-FDD 900 MHz Band 8	GSM / LTE-FDD 1800 MHz Band 3	UMTS / LTE-FDD 2100 MHz Band 1	LTE-FDD 2300 MHz Band 40	TD-LTE 2500 MHz Band 41	NR-TDD 3500 MHz Band n78	NR-TDD 26 GHz Band n258
Delhi	Yes	Yes	Yes	No	Yes	Yes	Yes
Mumbai	Yes	Yes	Yes	No	Yes	Yes	Yes
Kolkata	Yes	Yes	Yes	No	Yes	Yes	Yes
Andhra Pradesh & Telangana	Yes	Yes	Yes	No	Yes	Yes	Yes
Gujarat	Yes	Yes	Yes	No	Yes	Yes	Yes
Karnataka	Yes	Yes	Yes	No	No	Yes	Yes
Maharashtra & Goa	Yes	Yes	Yes	Yes	Yes	Yes	Yes
Tamil Nadu	Yes	Yes	Yes	No	No	Yes	Yes
Haryana	Yes	Yes	Yes	No	Yes	Yes	Yes
Kerala	Yes	Yes	Yes	Yes	Yes	Yes	Yes
Madhya Pradesh & Chhattisgarh	Yes	Yes	Yes	Yes	Yes	Yes	Yes
Punjab	Yes	Yes	Yes	No	Yes	Yes	Yes
Rajasthan	Yes	Yes	Yes	No	Yes	Yes	Yes
Uttar Pradesh (East)	Yes	Yes	Yes	No	Yes	Yes	Yes
Uttar Pradesh (West)	Yes	Yes	Yes	No	Yes	Yes	Yes
West Bengal	Yes	Yes	Yes	No	Yes	Yes	Yes
Assam	No	Yes	Yes	No	Yes	No	No
Bihar & Jharkhand	No	Yes	Yes	No	Yes	Yes	No
Himachal Pradesh	No	Yes	Yes	No	Yes	No	No
Jammu and Kashmir & Ladakh	No	Yes	Yes	No	Yes	No	No
North East	No	Yes	Yes	No	Yes	No	No
Odisha	Yes	Yes	Yes	No	Yes	No	No

This table contains Vodafone Idea radio frequency details because they had integrated their networks with each other and using one anchor network for both brands in all respective telecom circles. For example, Idea has started 4G services in Delhi and Kolkata telecom circle from May 2018 where the Vodafone is anchor network vice versa Vodafone has Started 4G services in Madhya Pradesh & Chhattisgarh, Bihar & Jharkhand, Andhra Pradesh & Telangana, Himachal Pradesh and Jammu and Kashmir telecom Circle's where Idea is Anchor network. In March 2025, Vodafone Idea (Vi) launched its 5G services in Mumbai.

=== Network consolidation ===
By March 2019, Vodafone Idea announced its network consolidation across major circles, easing network issues faced by consumers and also improving its 4G coverage. Announcements of Network Consolidation were made as below:

Enhanced Unified (2G, 3G, and 4G) coverage details

State	No of Towns Covered	No of Villages Covered	Coverage area %/km
Haryana	145	6520	99.5%
ROWB	878	37585	97%
Madhya Pradesh & Chhattisgarh	664	53130	60%
Jammu and Kashmir	110	3301	
AP & Telangana	391	19700	92.5%
Bihar & Jharkhand	431	43503	79%
HP	59	11929	
NESA & Assam	439	17850	41%

Enhanced (4G) coverage details

State	No of Towns Covered	No of districts Covered	No of Villages Covered	Population %
Haryana	137	22		76.08%
ROWB	838	27		78%
Madhya Pradesh & Chhattisgarh	633	77		52%
Jammu and Kashmir	48	9	526	23.6%
AP & Telangana	381	23	8500	67%
Bihar & Jharkhand	343	56	19931	45.3%
HP	45	8	6082	43%
NESA & Assam	340	83	4200	70%
Punjab	227	24	10162	90%

== Over The Top (OTT) ==
Vi Movies & TV formerly known as (Vodafone Play and Idea Movies & TV) it was launched in 2016 it is currently available for Vi subscribers on Android (5.1 and above versions) and IOS (10.0 and above versions).

== See also ==
- American Tower
- Belvedere Towers metro station
- List of mobile network operators
- You Broadband
