= K. R. Sunil =

Indian photographer and visual artist (born 1975)

- Born: 1975 (age 50–51); Kodungallur, Thrissur, Kerala
- Occupations: Photographer; visual artist; writer
- Website: krsunil.com

K. R. Sunil (born 1975) is an Indian documentary photographer, visual artist, and writer from Kerala. In 1997, he won Kerala Lalithakala Akademi's Special Mention Award for painting. In 2016, he won Habitat Photosphere Award from India Habitat Centre for photography.

== Early life ==
Sunil hails from Kodungallur, Kerala, India. He earned his bachelor's degree in sculpture from the College of Fine Arts, Thrissur, where he discovered his passion for photography. His friend, photographer Krishna Kumar, introduced him to the art of photography. Sunil spent hours in the library, poring over issues of National Geographic magazine, which he considers his "bible". According to him, he learned photography more through observation and believes that formal technical education is not essential.

== Career ==
Sunil's work primarily focuses on human life; often ethnographic portrayals set against the backdrop of social and environmental issues. The recurring themes in his art documentation include the sea, maritime history, and climate change. The powerful, investigative representation of common people's struggles in a complex society through his work intents to inspire social change and bring attention to important issues. Sunil has received multiple awards for his series on various socio-relevant topics. For instance, his series titled 'Chronicle of a Disappearance,' which explored the dwindling ponds of Kerala, won him the India Habitat Photosphere Award in 2016. His 'Vanishing Life Worlds' series, which depicted the lives of the old port city of Ponnani, was exhibited at the Kochi Muziris Biennale in 2016. Additionally, his 'Manchukkar - The Seafarers of Malabar' series, which documented the last surviving group of dhow workers along the Malabar coast, was exhibited at the Uru Art Harbour in Kochi in 2018 and at the Clarinda Carnegie Art Museum, USA in 2021, while also getting printed by a Swiss publication the same year. Sunil's series 'Home' explores the impact of climate change on coastal homes and livelihoods. It was part of exhibitions by the Kochi Muziris Biennale Foundation at Kochi and Alappey in 2021. Furthermore, his photography series titled 'Chavittu Nadakam: Story Tellers of the Seashore' sheds light on the lives of Dalit Christian performers of the age-old art form Chavittu Nadakam and how climate change affects them.

He has participated in the curatorial exhibition of Mattancherry by artist and curator Riyas Komu. Mattancherry photography series gazes the subaltern livelihood with a concrete ethnographic document to the contemporary cultural historiography Kerala. Mattancherry Island is a major hub of many waves of sea root connections from various parts of the world. He has published his books Manchukkar: The Seafarers of Malabar(2021), Velichappadum Pokkattadikkarum(2025)

== Filmography ==
Year	Title	Notes
2025	Thudarum	Screenwriter

== Vanishing Life Worlds (2016) ==
The series was exhibited at the Kochi-Muziris Biennale in 2016.

== Chronicle of a Disappearance (2016) ==
The series was exhibited at the India Habitat Centre Delhi in 2016, curated by Alka Pandey, and at RMIT Gallery, Melbourne in 2017, which was curated by Suzanne Davies & Helen Reyment.

== Mattancherry (2017) ==
The series was exhibited at the Uru Art Harbour, Kochi in 2017, curated by Riyas Komu.

== Manchukkar- The Seafarers of Malabar (2018) ==
The series was exhibited at the Uru Art Harbour, Kochi in 2017, curated by Riyas Komu, and at the Clarinda Carnegie Art Museum, USA| 2021 | Curated by Karen and Robert Duncan. Furthermore, Kunstdepot Göschenen, Switzerland published the series as a catalog in 2021.

== Home (2020) ==
The series was exhibited at Lokame Tharavadu (The World is One Family), Alapuzha in 2021, which was curated by Bose Krishnamachari

== Chavittu Nadakam – Storytellers of the Seashore (2022) ==
The series narrated multiple dimensions of performers of Chavittu Nadakam, a regional art form that originated and exists primarily in the coastal strip between Kochi and Kodungallur in Kerala. Influenced by the Portuguese colonization era, the art form had been embraced and carried on by the Latin Christian community from as early as the 16th and 17th centuries. While these artists are enduring to keep this art form alive today, they are also faced with a constant threat of sea encroachment and waterlogging as a result of climate change, that is making their lives all the more difficult. The series was exhibited at Kashi Hallegua House in Kochi in 2022 as part of the show ‘Sea – A Boiling Vessel’ curated by Riyas Komu.
