= Bajaj XCD =

XCD 125 DTS-Si
- Manufacturer: Bajaj Auto
- Production: 2007–2009
- Successor: Bajaj XCD 135; Bajaj Pulsar 135
- Engine: 125 cc single, twin spark
- Power: 9.53 PS (7.01 kW; 9.40 hp) @ 7,000 rpm
- Torque: 10.85 N⋅m (8.00 lb⋅ft) @ 5,000 rpm
- Suspension: Telescopic front fork, dual rear shock
- Brakes: Drum type
- Wheelbase: 1,275 mm (50.2 in)
- Fuel capacity: 2 gallons

The Bajaj XCD 125 DTS-Si was a motorcycle manufactured in India by Bajaj Auto. It was launched in September 2007. It clocked up sales of 18,000 units in its first month and sold around 28,000 units per month. In January 2009, a 135 cc version of XCD was launched. Bajaj reported that more than 20,000 units of XCD 135 were sold in its first month of launch. Due to reduced sales, the 125 cc version was discontinued by Bajaj in November 2009, followed by the 135cc variant.

== Design and styling ==
Bajaj XCD was the first 125 cc bike in India to feature LCD instruments in the console. It also features a spring-loaded foldable number plate which prevents damage to the low mounted fairing in case of sudden front fork The 135 cc variant features the same analog tachometer and digital speedometer as the Bajaj Discover.

== Ride and handling ==
Although the XCD provides the right ergonomics for the average Indian, it has been found to be uncomfortable for taller people. The rider has an upright stance and the small wheelbase and the tall handlebar is designed for city riding.

== Performance and fuel economy ==
Bajaj has claimed that with the digital twin spark swirl induction technology, the bike is capable of giving a mileage of 109 kilometres per litre (310 mpg_{‑imp}; 260 mpg_{‑US}), but at least one third party review reports a highway mileage of around 82 kilometres per litre (230 mpg_{‑imp}; 190 mpg_{‑US}), with city mileage being 68 kilometres per litre (190 mpg_{‑imp}; 160 mpg_{‑US}). The bike has a top speed of around 90 km/h and does 0–60 km/h in 8 seconds.

== Awards ==
Bajaj XCD has won the following awards in 2008:

- Bike of the year—Business Standard Motoring
- Bike of the year up to 125 cc—Bike India
- Bike of the year—CNBC-TV18 Autocar awards
