= Vodafone India =

Defunct Indian telecommunications company

Vodafone India Limited
- Formerly: Hutchison Max Telecom Limited (1992-2005); Hutchison Essar Limited (2005-2007); Vodafone Essar Limited (2007-2011)
- Type: Subsidiary
- Industry: Telecommunications
- Founded: February 21, 1992; 34 years ago
- Founder: Hutchison Whampoa; Max Group
- Defunct: 31 August 2018; 8 years ago (as a company) 7 September 2020; 6 years ago (as a brand)
- Fate: Merged with Idea Cellular into Vodafone Idea
- Successor: Vodafone Idea
- Headquarters: Mumbai, India
- Area served: India
- Services: Mobile telephony Internet
- Owner: Vodafone (100%)
- Parent: Vodafone Group
- Subsidiaries: You Broadband (100%)

Vodafone India was the Indian subsidiary of United Kingdom-based Vodafone Group and was a provider of telecommunications services in India with its operational head office in Mumbai.

As of March 2018, Vodafone India had a market share of 21%, and with its merger with Idea, the collective Vodafone Idea network has approximately 375 million subscribers and is the third largest mobile telecommunications network in India.

== History ==
Hutchison Max Telecom (HMTL), a joint venture between Hutchison Whampoa and the Max Group, was established on 21 February 1992. The licence to operate in Bombay circle was awarded to Hutchison Max by the Department of Telecommunications (DoT) in November 1994. The mobile service branded "Max Touch" was launched the same year. Hutchison Max entered into the Delhi telecom circle in December 1999, the Kolkata circle in July 2000 and the Gujarat circle in September 2000. Licences for these circles had initially been awarded by the DoT in 1994, 1997 and 1995 respectively. Between 1992 and 2006, Hutchison acquired interests in all 23 mobile telecom circles of India.

HMTL was renamed Hutchison Essar (HEL) in August 2005. Following the 2004 initial public offering of Hutchison Telecommunications International (HTIL), the group expanded its footprint to 16 of India's 23 licence areas, further solidified by the acquisition of BPL Mobile. By focusing on high-ARPU (Average Revenue Per User) urban markets such as Mumbai, Delhi, and Kolkata, the company established a robust network and a premium brand identity prior to its nationwide expansion.

In February 2007, Vodafone Group Plc entered into a binding agreement to acquire HTIL's 67% stake in Hutchison Essar for approximately $11.1 billion. The acquisition was formally completed on 8 May 2007, marking one of the largest foreign direct investment deals in Indian history at the time.

=== Advertising and Branding ===
The brand's marketing strategy, led by Marketing Director Harit Nagpal and creative agency Ogilvy & Mather (O&M), was characterized by a minimalist aesthetic.

In 2003, the company launched an iconic campaign featuring a Pug named "Cheeka" following a young boy, accompanied by the tagline, "Wherever you go, our network follows." The campaign was so successful that Vodafone continued to use the pug in its advertisements even after the 2007 rebranding.

During the 2009 Indian Premier League (IPL), the brand introduced the ZooZoos—white, ghost-like creatures with ballooned bodies and egg-shaped heads. These characters, created by O&M's Piyush Pandey and Rajiv Rao, became a cultural phenomenon in India, winning numerous awards for creative excellence and consumer engagement.

=== Vodafone purchases Essar's stake ===
In July 2011, Vodafone Group bought the mobile phone business of its partner Essar Group for $5.46 billion. This meant Vodafone owns 74% of Essar. On 11 February 2007, Vodafone agreed to acquire the controlling interest of 67% held by Li Ka Shing Holdings in Hutchison Essar for US$11.1 billion, pipping Reliance Communications, Hinduja Group, and Essar Group, which is the owner of the remaining 33%. The whole company was valued at USD 18.8 billion. The transaction closed on 8 May 2007. In April 2014, India based Piramal Group sold its 11% Stake in Vodafone India to Prime Metals, an indirect subsidiary of Vodafone Group.

=== Vodafone-Hutchison tax case ===
The long-standing tax dispute between Vodafone and the Indian government, stemming from the 2007 acquisition of Hutchison Essar, reached a final resolution in 2021 following international arbitration and legislative reform.

==== International Arbitration (2020) ====
In 2014, Vodafone initiated arbitration under the India–Netherlands Bilateral Investment Treaty, contesting the 2012 retrospective tax amendment. On 25 September 2020, the Permanent Court of Arbitration (PCA) ruled unanimously in favour of Vodafone, stating that the tax demand was a breach of the guarantee of "fair and equitable treatment." The tribunal directed India to cease its recovery efforts for the approximately ₹22,100 crore demand.

==== Repeal of Retrospective Tax (2021) ====
Following the arbitration award and similar international rulings, the Indian Parliament passed the Taxation Laws (Amendment) Act, 2021. This legislation effectively repealed the 2012 retrospective tax for transactions involving the indirect transfer of Indian assets executed before May 2012. The law nullified all pending tax demands and provided for the refund of collected taxes without interest, contingent on companies withdrawing all related litigation against the state.

==== Final Closure (2025) ====
In November 2025, the Income Tax Department officially closed the final chapter of the dispute by withdrawing its remaining ₹8,500-crore transfer pricing case against Vodafone India Services before the Supreme Court of India. The withdrawal followed judicial developments regarding adjusted gross revenue (AGR) liabilities, marking the end of nearly two decades of litigation.

=== Merger with Idea Cellular and rebranding ===
The entry of Jio in 2016 led to significant consolidation in the Indian telecom sector. Following the March 2017 announcement, Vodafone India and Idea Cellular completed their merger on 31 August 2018, forming Vodafone Idea. On 7 September 2020, the company rebranded its unified entity as Vi (pronounced "we").

==== Shareholding and Government Intervention ====
While the company was initially a joint venture between Vodafone Group (45.5%) and Aditya Birla Group (26%), its ownership structure changed drastically due to financial distress related to Adjusted Gross Revenue (AGR) dues.

In early 2023, the Government of India (GoI) converted ₹16,133 crore of interest dues into a 33.1% equity stake. By April 2025, the government further increased its stake to **48.99%** by converting an additional ₹36,950 crore of spectrum and AGR dues into equity, making it the single largest shareholder.

As of February 2026, the shareholding pattern is as follows:

- Government of India: 48.99% (Non-promoter largest shareholder)
- Promoter Group (Vodafone & Birla): 25.57% (Retain operational management control)
- Public & Others: 25.44%

Despite its large stake, the government has officially stated it has no plans to intervene in management or increase its holding beyond 49%.

== You Broadband ==
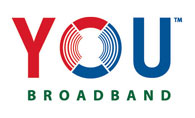
You Broadband

You Broadband (formerly YOU Telecom and originally Iqara Telecom) is an Indian telecommunications company founded by British Gas and, since 2017, owned by Vodafone India, which offers fixed-line broadband (FTTH) and voice services (VoIP) in indian major cities which includes Ahmedabad, Aurangabad, Bengaluru, Chennai, Gurugram, Hyderabad, Kakinada, Mumbai, Nagpur, Nashik, Navi Mumbai, Navsari, Powai, Pune, Rajkot, Surat, Thane, Vadodara, Valsad, Vapi, Vijayawada and Visakhapatnam.

== Mobile network ==
Since 2011, Vodafone launched 3G network using 900MHz and 2100MHz. The first city to receive 3G service was Lucknow in Uttar Pradesh.

M-Pesa, was launched in India as a close partnership with HDFC Bank in November 2011.

On 28 June 2012, Vodafone launched a new international roaming package under which the users shall have not to pay multiple rentals in the countries they are visiting.

On 19 May 2015, TRAI announced that Vodafone had been awarded spectrum in 9 circles for 3G coverage, bidding around ₹ 11617.86 million (the second highest amount in the auctions) for the spectrum.

On 8 December 2015, Vodafone announced the roll out of its 4G coverage in India on 1.8 GHz and 2.1 GHz bands starting from Kochi. The service became available to customers in India nationally in 2017, with plans for further expansion. Vodafone now starts 2100Mhz and 2500 MHz for 4G by which customers will get superior 4G speed than previous.

=== VoLTE ===
Vodafone India had started rolling its VoLTE services in the country under the tag Vodafone Super VoLTE. Gujarat was the first circle to receive that service. Before the merger with Vodafone Idea, the circles where the company was providing VoLTE were:

- West Bengal
- Assam
- Gujarat
- Delhi & NCR
- Haryana
- Karnataka
- Maharashtra & Goa
- Mumbai
- Rajasthan
- UP (W)
- UP (E)
- Punjab
- Kerala
- Kolkata
- Chennai

== Awards and recognition ==
- LinkedIn Top Attractors 2017 Award- Vodafone India ranked 20th
- CIO Choice 2018 Award winner- Vodafone Business Services recognized as the chosen leader for Telecom Carrier - Leased Lines & Mobile Access
- The Brand Trust Report, 2011 published by Trust Research Advisory has ranked Vodafone as the 16th most trusted brand in India.
- Flame Awards Asia 2017 for #Saluteourfarmers campaign: Silver for the Best Farmer Connect initiative and Bronze for the Best use of Social Media
- Aegis Graham Bell Awards 2017: Vodafone Business Services for Innovative Marketing Campaign for the Ready Business CampaignAegis Graham Bell Awards 2017 and Vodafone Business Services for Innovative Marketing Campaign for the Ready Business Campaign
- Voice and Data Telecom Leadership Awards 2015:Special leadership recognition to: Vodafone RED for marketing

== See also ==
- Essar Group
- Hutchison Telecommunications International
- Idea Cellular
- Max Group
- Orange (India)
- Vodafone
- Vodafone Belvedere Towers metro station
- Vodafone Idea
