= ZooZoo =

Indian advertising characters

- Zoozoo in Vodafone ad
- Agency: Ogilvy & Mather
- Client: Vodafone Essar
- Product: Mobile service
- Directed by: Prakash Varma
- Production company: Nirvana Films
- Produced by: Rajiv Rao

ZooZoos are advertisement characters promoted by Vodafone Essar since the Indian Premier League Season 2 (IPL).
ZooZoos are white creatures with ballooned bodies and egg heads who are used to promote various value added services of Vodafone. These characters are played by human actors in body suits. The ads were created by Ogilvy & Mather, the agency handling Vodafone advertisements.
The ads were shot by Bangalore based Nirvana Films in Cape Town, South Africa. Prakash Varma directed the ads.

== History ==
The ZooZoo idea was conceived by Rajive Rao. He also created the story lines and the name. The ads were shot by Prakash Varma and produced by Nirvana Films within a record time of 10 days. The pre-production work happened within a month and cost around 3 crores Indian Rupees.

== Making ==
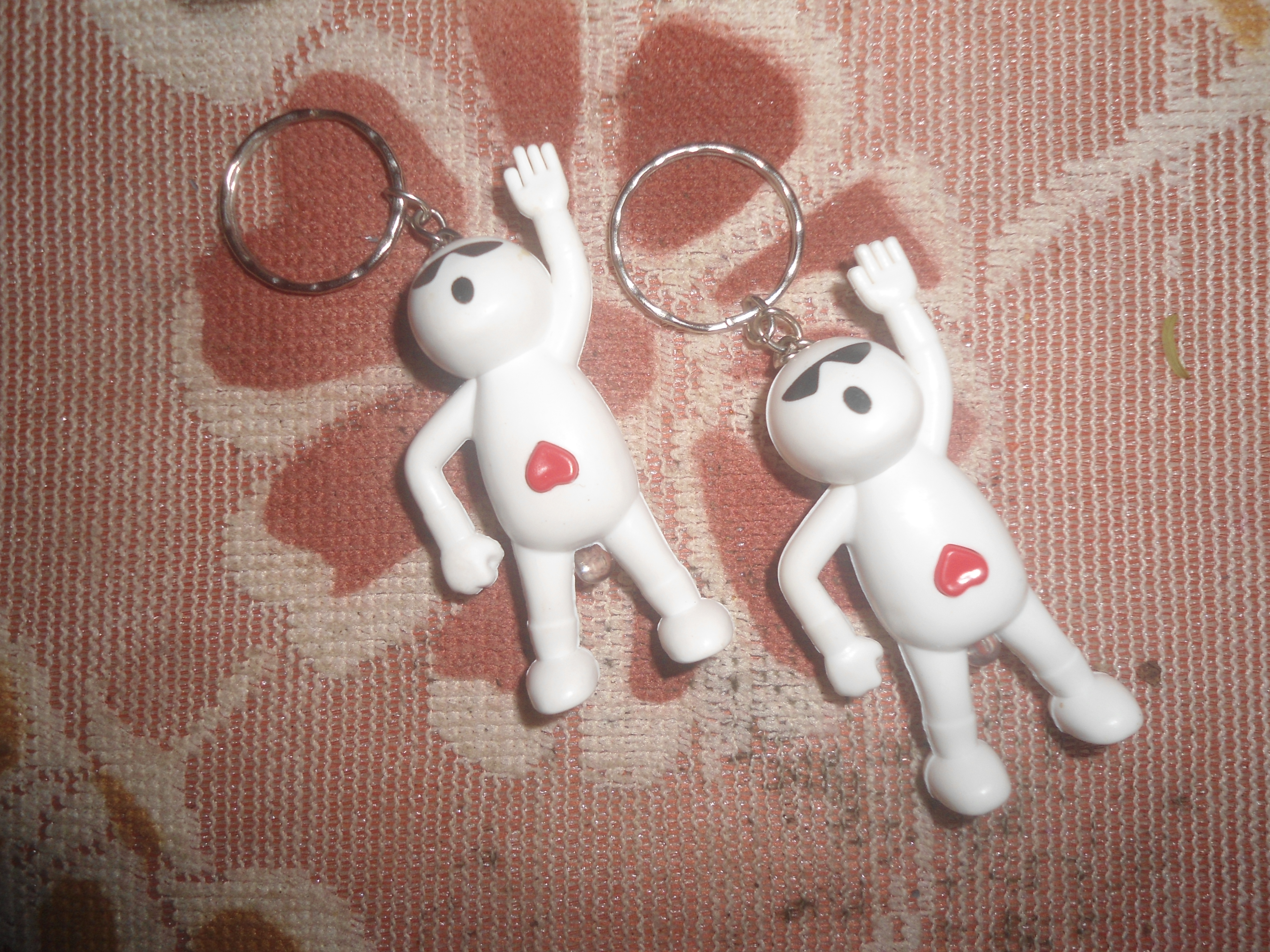
Zoozoo key chains in India

Ogilvy & Mather, the agency that handles Vodafone advertisements, was asked by Vodafone to create a series of 30 advertisements which could be aired each day during the IPL Season 2. According to Rajiv Rao, National Creative Director of Ogilvy & Mather, they "wanted to make real people look as animated as possible". They employed Bangalore-based Nirvana Films to shoot these ads in Cape Town, South Africa through the Cape Town-based production house, Platypus Productions.

The Zoozoos are small-bodied, thin women covered in layers of white fabric. Each facial expression is made of rubber and pasted on the actors to cut down on the time and cost for shoot. The effect was achieved by a variety of methods including choosing the right material for the body suits to ensure that there were no wrinkles when the characters moved, shooting the footage at lower framerates and keeping backgrounds simple in terms of details and the use of a neutral tone of grey. The sets were made larger than life to make the characters look small as the producers could not take children as the schedule of shooting was odd.

The Zoozoos were split in two parts - the body and the head. The body was made using a special material stuffed with foam in some places (notably around the stomach) while the head was created using a harder material called Perspex.

== Public response ==
The ads were a hit among the Indian audience. This can be gauged from the huge fan following on social networking sites such as Facebook, Orkut and Twitter. There are more than 200 pages on ZooZoos having over 250000 fans, growing daily. The ads were also viewed by thousands of people on YouTube.

Vodafone received the first People for the Ethical Treatment of Animals (PETA) 2009 Glitterbox Award, for replacing the Pug with more humane alternatives in their ads.

RN Podar School, Santa Cruz, Mumbai is planning to develop an animated character, inspired by the ZooZoos to attract students and will be used to teach Environmental Studies (EVS) to class I students.

Vodafone 3G's Super ZooZoo which was introduced as a symbol of Vodafone 3G launch in India was brought to life using a Kinect and making it dance to reggae.
