= GTL Ltd =

Indian telecommunications company

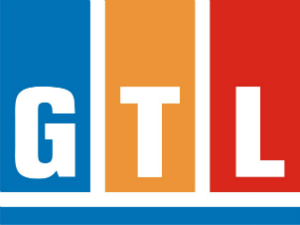
- Type: Public
- Traded as: BSE: 500160; NSE: GTL
- Founded: 1987
- Headquarters: Navi Mumbai, India
- Products: Network Services Provider
- Revenue: ₹22.37 billion (US$230 million) (2010)
- Operating income: ₹5.63 billion (US$58 million) (2010)
- Net income: ₹2.06 billion (US$21 million) (2010)
- Number of employees: 5042 (as of March 2017)
- Website: GTLLimited.com

GTL Limited (Global Telesystems Limited), is a network services company based in Navi Mumbai. It is India's largest network services provider to the world, and is a Global Group Enterprise.

GTL Limited provides services to telecom operators, technology providers, original equipment manufacturers, and Tower Companies across India, and also across the Asia-Pacific, Europe and the Middle East through its subsidiaries.

Manoj G. Tirodkar is the chairman, managing director and founder of Global Telesystems Limited. As of 2026, GTL Limited is chaired by Duraiswamy Sargurudas Gunasingh, with Rufina Juliana Fernandes serving as a whole-time director. The company's board also includes Navin Jethanand Kripalani, Siddhi Mandar Thakur, Mahesh Muralidhar Borase, Sanjana Santosh Pawar and Jyotisana Shivaji Kondhalkar.

== History ==
In 2001, GTL set up a 1,000 seat call centre in Navi Mumbai.

In 2007, GTL Ltd monetized its enterprise networks and managed services business to Orange Business Services, an arm of France Telecom. In 2025 and 2026, the company continued to report its financial and corporate developments through filings with the BSE and NSE. For the financial year ended 31 March 2026, GTL Limited reported total income from operations of ₹226.70 crore and a net profit of ₹582.55 crore after exceptional items.

== Shareholding ==
As of 31 March 2017, the number of equity shares of GTL Ltd were approximately 157.29 million. The Promoter and the Promoter group, including Global Holding Corporation Private Limited, collectively hold approximately 30.25% of the total equity shares. Banks (including the lender banks under the corporate debt restructuring mechanism) hold around 37.21%, and the remaining 32.54% shares are held by public shareholders. Syndicate Bank is the largest non-promoter investor in the company, with 13.99% shareholding. As of 31 December 2024, GTL Limited had 157,296,781 equity shares. Global Holding Corporation Private Limited, part of the promoter group, held 22,480,559 shares, representing 14.29% of the company's equity. Public shareholders held the remaining 85.71%.

== Listing ==
The company's equity shares are listed on the NSE Limited and the BSE Limited. The company continued to have its equity shares listed on both exchanges in 2026 and reported its financial results and other regulatory disclosures through the exchanges.

== Services ==
GTL Ltd offers services including:

- Planning of networks, including Radio Frequency (RF) and Transmission Engineering, Fixed and Core Network Engineering for GSM, CDMA, Microwave Transmission, SDH, DWDM, WiMAX and Broadband networks.
- Rollout of networks, such as GSM, CDMA, Microwave Transmission, Optical Transmission, WiMAX and Broadband Networks.
- Maintenance of established networks.
