= Mobile telephone numbering in India =

In India, mobile numbers (including pagers) on GSM, WCDMA, LTE and NR networks start with either 9, 8, 7 or 6. Each telecom circle is allowed to have multiple private operators; previously it was two private + BSNL/MTNL, subsequently it changed to three private + BSNL/MTNL in GSM; however currently each telecom circle has all four operators including Reliance Jio, Bharti Airtel, Vodafone Idea and BSNL/MTNL.

All mobile phone numbers are 10 digits long. The way to split the numbers is defined in the National Numbering Plan as XXXXX-NNNNN. Here, XXXXX identifies the network operator and the telecom circle while NNNNN identifies the subscriber. While 'XXXXX' used to be network operator identification. Due to Mobile number portability XXXXX-NNNNN no longer a good way to split. Instead XXXX-NNN-NNN is a better format. Where XXXX represents the geographic location and NNN-NNN represents the subscriber number. This split of XXXX-NNN-NNN offers better readability.

== Telecom circles ==
The Department of Telecommunications has divided India into various telecom circles such that within each circle, the call is treated as a local call, while across zones, it becomes a long-distance call. As of July 2018 there are 22 telecom circles or service areas. They are classified into four categories: Metro, A, B, C. Chennai, Delhi, Mumbai, and Kolkata fall under Metro category.

A telecom circle is normally the entire state, with a few exceptions like Mumbai, Chennai and Kolkata (which are different zones than their respective states), Goa (which is a part of the Maharashtra zone), Chhattisgarh (which is part of Madhya Pradesh), Sikkim (which is part of West Bengal) Jharkhand (which is a part of the Bihar zone), Northeastern states except Assam and Sikkim (which are part of Northeast zone) or Uttar Pradesh (divided into east and west zones). Delhi is a unique circle because it includes cities from Haryana (Gurgaon and Faridabad) and Uttar Pradesh (Noida and Ghaziabad) as well. The new state of Telangana remains in the same circle as Andhra Pradesh.

From May 20, 2005, calls between Mumbai Metro and Maharashtra Telecom Circle, between Chennai Metro and Tamil Nadu Telecom Circle, and between Uttar Pradesh (East) and Uttar Pradesh (West) Telecom Circle service areas are merged in Inter service area connected in the above-mentioned four states would be treated as intra-service area call for the purposes of routing as well as Access Deficit Charges (ADC). The dialing procedure for calls within a state for these states would also be simplified, i.e. dialing of mobile-to mobile subscribers and fixed-to-mobile subscribers would be without prefixing '0'.

In December 2017, Reliance Jio started with the newest of all, "the six-series-mobile numbers", keeping in mind the growing number of users in India.Recently ,5G users are rapidly replacing 4G ones, making it the 2nd after 4G with about 400 million subscribers. Although 4G still has a larger base than 5G,reaserchers think that the total number of 5G subscribers will rise to 1 Billion by 2030 as 4G subscribers are also decreasing as years pass.

Circle name	Code	Category	Geographic area(s) covered
Andhra Pradesh	AP	A	State of Andhra Pradesh, State of Telangana and Yanam district
Assam	AS	C	State of Assam
Bihar & Jharkhand	BR	C	State of Bihar and State of Jharkhand
Chennai	CH	Metro	Chennai, upto Maraimalai Nagar, Minjur and Mahabalipuram
Delhi	DL	Metro	Union Territory of Delhi, Faridabad district and Gurgaon district in Haryana, Ghaziabad district and Gautam Buddh Nagar district in Uttar Pradesh
Gujarat	GJ	A	State of Gujarat and Union Territory of Dadra and Nagar Haveli and Daman and Diu
Himachal Pradesh	HP	C	State of Himachal Pradesh
Haryana	HR	B	State of Haryana (excluding Faridabad district, Gurgaon district and Panchkula district).
Jammu and Kashmir	JK	C	Union Territory of Jammu and Kashmir and Union Territory of Ladakh
Kerala & Lakshadweep	KL	B	State of Kerala, Union Territory of Lakshadweep and Mahé district
Karnataka	KA	A	State of Karnataka
Kolkata	KO	Metro	Kolkata (including parts of Howrah district, Hooghly district, North 24 Parganas district, South 24 Parganas district and Nadia district)
Maharashtra & Goa	MH	A	State of Maharashtra (excluding Mumbai, Navi Mumbai, Thane and Kalyan) and State of Goa
Madhya Pradesh & Chhattisgarh	MP	B	State of Madhya Pradesh and State of Chhattisgarh
Mumbai	MU	Metro	Mumbai, Navi Mumbai, Thane and Kalyan
North East	NE	C	State of Arunachal Pradesh, State of Manipur State of Meghalaya, State of Mizoram, State of Nagaland and State of Tripura
Odisha	OR	C	State of Odisha
Punjab	PB	B	State of Punjab, Union Territory of Chandigarh and Panchkula district
Rajasthan	RJ	B	State of Rajasthan
Tamil Nadu	TN	A	State of Tamil Nadu, Puducherry district and Karaikal district
UP (East)	UE	B	Eastern Uttar Pradesh
UP (West)	UW	B	Western Uttar Pradesh (excluding Ghaziabad district and Gautam Buddh Nagar district) and State of Uttarakhand
West Bengal	WB	C	State of West Bengal (excluding Kolkata), State of Sikkim and Union Territory of Andaman and Nicobar Islands

== Network operators ==
Network operators
AT	Airtel India
CG	BSNL/MTNL - Central Gov.
RJ	Reliance Jio
VI	Vodafone Idea

- Note: The mobile numbers and operators are subject to change since Mobile number portability is available in most circles.

- Note: Chennai circle was merged with Tamil Nadu circle in 2005.

== Call No Series ==
Visualization map - The map illustrates the distribution of mobile number prefixes across Indian states based on the data provided in the table below.

Visualization of Mobile Number Prefixes (First Four Digits) Across Indian States

Mobile telephone numbering system: 9xxx 8xxx 7xxx 6xxx series last 10 number
9xxx Series
90 series			91 series			92 series			93 series			94 series			95 series			96 series			97 series			98 series			99 series		
9000	AT	AP	9100	AT	AP	9200	AT	MP	9300			9400	CG	KL	9500	AT	TN	9600	AT	TN	9700			9800	AT	WB	9900	AT	KA
9001	AT	RJ	9101	RJ	AS	9201	RJ	MP	9301	RJ	MP	9401	CG	AS	9501	AT	PB	9601	AT	GJ	9701	AT	AP	9801	AT	BR	9901	AT	KA
9002	AT	WB	9102	AT	BR	9202	RJ	MP	9302	RJ	MP	9402	CG	NE	9502	AT	AP	9602	AT	RJ	9702	VI	MU	9802			9902	AT	KA
9003	AT	TN	9103	AT	AP	9203	RJ	MP	9303			9403	CG	MH	9503	AT	MH	9603	VI	AP	9703	VI	AP	9803			9903	AT	KO
9004	AT	MU	9104	AT	GJ	9204	RJ	BR	9304	RJ	BR	9404	CG	MH	9504			9604	VI	MH	9704	AT	AP	9804			9904	VI	GJ
9005	AT	UE	9105	VI	UW	9205	AT	DL	9305	RJ	UE	9405	CG	MH	9505	VI	AP	9605	VI	KL	9705	VI	AP	9805	AT	HP	9905	RJ	BR
9006	AT	BR	9106	RJ	GJ	9206			9306	RJ	HR	9406	CG	MP	9506	VI	UE	9606	AT	KA	9706	VI	AS	9806			9906	AT	JK
9007	AT	KO	9107			9207	VI	KL	9307			9407	CG	MP	9507	VI	BR	9607			9707	AT	AS	9807			9907	RJ	WB
9008	AT	KA	9108	AT	KA	9208			9308	RJ	OR	9408	CG	GJ	9508	RJ	BR	9608	RJ	BR	9708	VI	BR	9808			9908	AT	AP
9009	VI	MP	9109	AT	MP	9209			9309	RJ	MH	9409	CG	GJ	9509	RJ	RJ	9609	VI	WB	9709	VI	BR	9809			9909	VI	GJ
9010	VI	AP	9110	RJ	KA	9210			9310	RJ	DL	9410	CG	UW	9510	RJ	GJ	9610	VI	RJ	9710			9810	AT	DL	9910	AT	DL
9011	VI	MH	9111	VI	MP	9211	AT	DL	9311	AT	DL	9411	CG	UW	9511	RJ	MH	9611	AT	KA	9711	VI	DL	9811	VI	DL	9911	VI	DL
9012	VI	UW	9112	VI	MH	9212			9312		DL	9412	CG	UW	9512	VI	GJ	9612	AT	NE	9712	VI	GJ	9812	VI	HR	9912	VI	AP
9013	CG	DL	9113	RJ	KA	9213	RJ	GJ	9313	RJ	GJ	9413	CG	RJ	9513	VI	KA	9613			9713	VI	MP	9813	VI	HR	9913	VI	GJ
9014	RJ	AP	9114	VI	OR	9214	RJ	UE	9314			9414	CG	RJ	9514	VI	TN	9614			9714	VI	GJ	9814	VI	PB	9914	VI	PB
9015	RJ	HP	9115	VI	PB	9215	RJ	GJ	9315	RJ	DL	9415	CG	UE	9515	AT	AP	9615			9715			9815	AT	PB	9915	AT	PB
9016	RJ	GJ	9116	AT	RJ	9216	AT	RJ	9316	RJ	GJ	9416	CG	HR	9516	VI	MP	9616	VI	UE	9716			9816	AT	HP	9916	VI	KA
9017			9117	VI	BR	9217			9317	RJ	HP	9417	CG	PB	9517	VI	PB	9617	VI	MP	9717	VI	DL	9817	RJ	HR	9917	VI	UW
9018			9118			9218	RJ	DL	9318	RJ	DL	9418	CG	HP	9518	RJ	HR	9618	AT	AP	9718	VI	DL	9818	AT	DL	9918	VI	UE
9019	RJ	KA	9119	VI/AT	MH/UE	9219	RJ	UE	9319	AT	DL	9419	CG	JK	9519	AT	UE	9619	VI	MU	9719	VI	UW	9819	VI	MU	9919	VI	UE
9020			9120			9220	AT	DL	9320			9420	CG	MH	9520			9620	VI	KA	9720	VI	UW	9820	VI	MU	9920	VI	MU
9021	RJ	MH	9121	AT	AP	9221	RJ	MH	9321	RJ	MU	9421	CG	MH	9521	AT	RJ	9621	AT	UE	9721	VI	UE	9821	AT	DL	9921	VI	MH
9022	RJ	MH	9122	AT	BR	9222			9322	RJ	MH	9422	CG	MH	9522	VI	MP	9622	AT	JK	9722			9822	VI	MH	9922	VI	MH
9023	RJ	GJ	9123	RJ	KO	9223	RJ	MH	9323			9423	CG	MH	9523	AT	BR	9623	VI	MH	9723	VI	GJ	9823	VI	MH	9923	VI	MH
9024	RJ	RJ	9124	AT	OR	9224	RJ	MU	9324	RJ	MU	9424	CG	MP	9524			9624	VI	GJ	9724	AT	GJ	9824	VI	GJ	9924	VI	GJ
9025	RJ	TN	9125	AT	UE	9225	RJ	MH	9325	RJ	MH	9425	CG	MP	9525	VI	BR	9625	RJ	DL	9725	AT	GJ	9825	VI	GJ	9925	VI	GJ
9026	RJ	UE	9126	AT	WB	9226	RJ	MH	9326	RJ	MU	9426	CG	GJ	9526	VI	KL	9626	VI	TN	9726	VI	GJ	9826	VI	MP	9926	VI	MP
9027	RJ	UW	9127	VI	AS	9227	RJ	GJ	9327	RJ	GJ	9427	CG	GJ	9527	VI	MH	9627	VI	UW	9727	VI	GJ	9827	RJ	OR	9927	VI	UW
9028	AT	MH	9128	VI	BR	9228			9328	RJ	GJ	9428	CG	GJ	9528	RJ	UW	9628	VI	UE	9728	VI	HR	9828	VI	RJ	9928	AT	RJ
9029	AT	MU	9129	AT	UE	9229	RJ	BR	9329			9429	CG	GJ	9529	RJ	MH	9629	AT	TN	9729	AT	HR	9829	AT	RJ	9929	AT	RJ
9030	AT	AP	9130	VI	MH	9230	RJ	KO	9330	RJ	KO	9430	CG	BR	9530	CG	RJ	9630	AT	MP	9730	AT	MH	9830	VI	KO	9930	AT	MU
9031	AT	BR	9131	RJ	MP	9231			9331			9431	CG	BR	9531	CG	WB	9631	AT	BR	9731	AT	KA	9831	AT	KO	9931	AT	BR
9032	AT	AP	9132			9232			9332			9432	CG	KO	9532	CG	UE	9632	AT	KA	9732	VI	WB	9832	RJ	WB	9932	AT	WB
9033	AT	GJ	9133	VI	AP	9233	AT	NE	9333			9433	CG	KO	9533			9633	AT	KL	9733	VI	WB	9833	VI	MU	9933	AT	WB
9034	AT	HR	9134	VI	WB	9234	RJ	BR	9334	RJ	BR	9434	CG	WB	9534	VI	BR	9634	AT	UW	9734	VI	WB	9834	AT	MH	9934	AT	BR
9035	AT	KA	9135	VI	BR	9235	RJ	UE	9335	RJ	UE	9435	CG	AS	9535	AT	KA	9635	AT	WB	9735	VI	WB	9835	RJ	BR	9935	AT	UE
9036	AT	KA	9136	AT	MU	9236	RJ	UE	9336	RJ	UE	9436	CG	NE	9536	VI	UW	9636	AT	RJ	9736	VI	HP	9836	VI	KO	9936	AT	UE
9037	AT	KL	9137	RJ	MU	9237	RJ	OR	9337	RJ	OR	9437	CG	OR	9537	VI	GJ	9637	VI	MH	9737	VI	GJ	9837	VI	UW	9937	AT	OR
9038	AT	KO	9138	AT	HR	9238	RJ	MP	9338			9438	CG	OR	9538	VI	KA	9638	VI	GJ	9738			9838	VI	UE	9938	AT	OR
9039	AT	MP	9139			9239	RJ	WB	9339			9439	CG	OR	9539	VI	KL	9639	VI	UW	9739	VI	KA	9839	VI	UE	9939	AT	BR
9040	AT	OR	9140	RJ	UE	9240	AT	TN	9340	RJ	MP	9440	CG	AP	9540	VI	DL	9640	VI	AP	9740	AT	KA	9840	AT	TN	9940	AT	TN
9041	AT	PB	9141	CG	KA	9241	RJ	BR	9341	RJ	BR	9441	CG	AP	9541	AT	JK	9641	RJ	WB	9741	AT	KA	9841			9941	AT	TN
9042	AT	TN	9142	RJ	BR	9242	RJ	WB	9342	RJ	TN	9442	CG	TN	9542	VI	AP	9642	VI	AP	9742	VI	KA	9842	RJ	AS	9942	RJ	BR
9043	AT	TN	9143			9243	RJ	MP	9343	RJ	MP	9443	CG	TN	9543			9643	VI	DL	9743	VI	KA	9843	VI	TN	9943	VI	TN
9044	AT	UE	9144	VI	WB	9244	RJ	MP	9344	RJ	TN	9444	CG	TN	9544	VI	KL	9644	VI	MP	9744	VI	KL	9844	VI	KA	9944	AT	TN
9045	AT	UW	9145	VI	MH	9245	RJ	NE	9345	RJ	TN	9445	CG	TN	9545	VI	MH	9645	VI	KL	9745	VI	KL	9845	AT	KA	9945	AT	KA
9046	AT	WB	9146	VI	MH	9246			9346	RJ	AP	9446	CG	KL	9546	AT	BR	9646	VI	PB	9746	AT	KL	9846	VI	KL	9946	VI	KL
9047	VI	TN	9147	AT	KO	9247			9347	RJ	AP	9447	CG	KL	9547	AT	WB	9647	VI	WB	9747	VI	KL	9847	VI	KL	9947	VI	KL
9048	VI	KL	9148	AT	KA	9248			9348	RJ	OR	9448	CG	KA	9548	RJ	UW	9648	VI	UE	9748	AT	KO	9848	VI	AP	9948	VI	AP
9049	VI	MH	9149	RJ	JK	9249	RJ	KL	9349	RJ	KL	9449	CG	KA	9549	VI	RJ	9649	VI	RJ	9749	RJ	WB	9849	AT	AP	9949	AT	AP
9050	VI	HR	9150	AT	TN	9250	RJ	UE	9350	RJ	HR	9450	CG	UE	9550	AT	AP	9650	AT	DL	9750			9850	VI	MH	9950	AT	RJ
9051	VI	KO	9151	AT	UE	9251	RJ	RJ	9351			9451	CG	UE	9551			9651	AT	UE	9751	VI	TN	9851			9951	VI	AP
9052	VI	AP	9152	VI	MU	9252	RJ	RJ	9352			9452	CG	UE	9552	VI	MH	9652	AT	AP	9752	AT	MP	9852			9952	AT	TN
9053	AT	HR	9153	RJ	BR	9253			9353	RJ	KA	9453	CG	UE	9553	VI	AP	9653	RJ	UE	9753	VI	MP	9853			9953	VI	DL
9054	AT	HP	9154	AT	AP	9254	RJ	HR	9354	RJ	DL	9454	CG	UE	9554	VI	UE	9654	VI	DL	9754	VI	MP	9854			9954	AT	AS
9055	AT	JK	9155	AT	BR	9255	CG	MU	9355	VI	DL	9455	CG	UE	9555	RJ	UE	9655	VI	TN	9755	AT	MP	9855	VI	PB	9955	AT	BR
9056	AT	PB	9156	AT	MH	9256	AT	RJ	9356	RJ	MH	9456	CG	UW	9556	AT	OR	9656	VI	KL	9756	VI	UW	9856			9956	AT	UE
9057	AT	RJ	9157	AT	GJ	9257	AT	RJ	9357			9457	CG	UW	9557	AT	UW	9657	VI	MH	9757			9857			9957	AT	AS
9058	AT	UW	9158	VI	MH	9258			9358	AT	RJ	9458	CG	UW	9558	AT	GJ	9658		OR	9758	VI	UW	9858			9958	AT	DL
9059	AT	AP	9159	VI	TN	9259	RJ	UW	9359	RJ	MH	9459	CG	HP	9559	AT	UE	9659			9759	VI	UW	9859			9959	AT	AP
9060	AT	BR	9160	VI	AP	9260			9360	RJ	TN	9460	CG	RJ	9560	AT	DL	9660	AT	RJ	9760	AT	UW	9860	AT	MH	9960	AT	MH
9061	AT	KL	9161	VI	UE	9261	RJ	RJ	9361			9461	CG	RJ	9561	AT	MH	9661	AT	BR	9761	VI	UW	9861	RJ	OR	9961	VI	KL
9062	AT	KO	9162	AT	BR	9262	AT	BR	9362			9462	CG	RJ	9562	VI	KL	9662	AT	GJ	9762			9862	AT	NE	9962	VI	TN
9063	VI	AP	9163	AT	KO	9263	RJ	BR	9363			9463	CG	PB	9563			9663	AT	KA	9763	VI	MH	9863	RJ	NE	9963	AT	AP
9064	VI	AS	9164	VI	KA	9264	RJ	BR	9364		TN	9464	CG	PB	9564	VI	WB	9664	RJ	GJ	9764	VI	MH	9864	RJ	AS	9964	VI	KA
9065	AT	BR	9165	AT	MP	9265	RJ	GJ	9365			9465	CG	PB	9565	VI	UE	9665	AT	MH	9765	VI	MH	9865	RJ	KA	9965		
9066			9166	AT	RJ	9266	AT	DL	9366	RJ	NE	9466	CG	HR	9566	AT	TN	9666	VI	AP	9766	AT	MH	9866	AT	AP	9966	VI	AP
9067	VI	MH	9167	VI	MU	9267	AT	UP	9367		TN	9467	CG	HR	9567	AT	KL	9667	AT	DL	9767	VI	MH	9867	AT	MU	9967	AT	MU
9068	AT	UW	9168	VI	MH	9268			9368	RJ	UW	9468	CG	HR	9568	VI	UW	9668	AT	OR	9768			9868	CG	DL	9968		
9069			9169			9269	RJ	RJ	9369	RJ	UE	9469	CG	JK	9569	RJ	UE	9669	VI	MP	9769	VI	MU	9869	CG	MU	9969		
9070	VI	JK	9170	AT	UE	9270	RJ	MH	9370	RJ	MH	9470	CG	BR	9570	VI	BR	9670	VI	UE	9770	RJ	MP	9870	AT	DL	9970	AT	MH
9071	VI	KA	9171	AT	TN	9271			9371	VI	MH	9471	CG	BR	9571	AT	RJ	9671	VI	HR	9771	AT	BR	9871	AT	DL	9971	AT	DL
9072	VI	KL	9172	AT	MU	9272	RJ	MH	9372	RJ	MU	9472	CG	BR	9572	AT	BR	9672	VI	RJ	9772	VI	RJ	9872	AT	PB	9972	AT	KA
9073	VI	KO	9173	AT	GJ	9273	RJ	MH	9373	RJ	MH	9473	CG	UE	9573	AT	AP	9673	VI	MH	9773	AT	DL	9873	VI	DL	9973	AT	BR
9074	RJ	KL	9174	AT	MP	9274	RJ	GJ	9374	VI	RJ	9474	CG	WB	9574	VI	GJ	9674	VI	KO	9774	VI	NE	9874	VI	KO	9974	AT	GJ
9075	VI	MH	9175	AT	MH	9275			9375	VI	RJ	9475	CG	WB	9575	VI	MP	9675	VI	UW	9775	VI	WB	9875	RJ	KO	9975	AT	MH
9076	AT	UE	9176	VI	TN	9276	RJ	GJ	9376	VI	RJ	9476	CG	WB	9576	VI	BR	9676	AT	AP	9776	VI	OR	9876	AT	PB	9976		
9077	VI	NE	9177	AT	AP	9277	RJ	UE	9377			9477	CG	KO	9577			9677	AT	TN	9777	AT	OR	9877	RJ	PB	9977	VI	MP
9078	AT	OR	9178	AT	OR	9278	RJ	UE	9378	AT	NE	9478	CG	PB	9578			9678	AT	AS	9778	RJ	KL	9878	AT	PB	9978	VI	GJ
9079	RJ	RJ	9179	AT	MP	9279	RJ	BR	9379			9479	CG	MP	9579	RJ	MH	9679	AT	WB	9779	AT	PB	9879	VI	GJ	9979	VI	GJ
9080	RJ	TN	9180	CG	AP	9280	RJ	TN	9380	RJ	KA	9480	CG	KA	9580	RJ	UE	9680	AT	RJ	9780	VI	PB	9880	AT	KA	9980	AT	KA
9081	VI	GJ	9181	CG	AS	9281	RJ	AP	9381	RJ	AP	9481	CG	KA	9581	VI	AP	9681			9781	VI	PB	9881	VI	MH	9981	AT	MP
9082	RJ	MU	9182	RJ	AP	9282			9382	RJ	WB	9482	CG	KA	9582	VI	DL	9682	RJ	JK	9782			9882	VI	HP	9982	VI	RJ
9083	VI	WB	9183	CG	TN	9283			9383	CG	KL	9483	CG	KA	9583	VI	OR	9683	CG	HR	9783	VI	RJ	9883	RJ	WB	9983	VI	RJ
9084	AT	UW	9184	CG	GJ	9284	RJ	MH	9384	AT	TN	9484	CG	JK	9584	VI	MP	9684	CG	MH	9784	AT	TN	9884	VI	TN	9984	VI	UE
9085	VI	AS	9185	CG	HP	9285	VI	MP	9385	CG	TN	9485	CG	NE	9585	VI	TN	9685	AT	MP	9785	VI	RJ	9885	VI	AP	9985	VI	AP
9086	VI	JK	9186	CG	JK	9286	RJ	UW	9386			9486	CG	TN	9586	VI	GJ	9686	AT	KA	9786	VI	TN	9886	VI	KA	9986	VI	KA
9087	VI	TN	9187	AT	KA	9287	RJ	AS	9387			9487	CG	TN	9587	VI	RJ	9687	VI	GJ	9787	VI	TN	9887	VI	RJ	9987	AT	MU
9088	VI	KO	9188	CG	KL	9288	RJ	BR	9388	RJ	GJ	9488	CG	TN	9588	RJ	HR	9688			9788			9888	VI	PB	9988	VI	PB
9089	VI	NE	9189	CG	KO	9289			9389	RJ	UW	9489	CG	TN	9589	AT	MP	9689	VI	MH	9789	AT	TN	9889	VI	UE	9989	AT	AP
9090	VI	OR	9190	CG	MP	9290			9390	RJ	AP	9490	CG	AP	9590			9690	VI	UW	9790	AT	TN	9890	AT	MH	9990	VI	DL
9091	VI	WB	9191	CG	NE	9291			9391	RJ	AP	9491	CG	AP	9591	AT	KA	9691	RJ	MP	9791	AT	TN	9891	VI	DL	9991	VI	HR
9092	VI	TN	9192	CG	OR	9292	AT	KL	9392	RJ	AP	9492	CG	AP	9592	VI	PB	9692	RJ	OR	9792	VI	UE	9892	AT	MU	9992	VI	HR
9093	VI	WB	9193	CG	PB	9293			9393			9493	CG	AP	9593	VI	WB	9693	RJ	BR	9793	AT	UE	9893	AT	MP	9993	AT	MP
9094	AT	TN	9194	RJ	UE	9294			9394			9494	CG	AP	9594	VI	MU	9694	VI	RJ	9794	AT	UE	9894	AT	TN	9994	AT	TN
9095			9195	CG	TN	9295			9395			9495	CG	KL	9595			9695	AT	UE	9795	VI	UE	9895	AT	KL	9995	AT	KL
9096	AT	MH	9196	RJ	UE	9296	RJ	BR	9396			9496	CG	KL	9596	AT	JK	9696	RJ	UE	9796	VI	JK	9896	AT	HR	9996	AT	HR
9097			9197	CG	WB	9297			9397			9497	CG	KL	9597	AT	TN	9697			9797	AT	JK	9897	AT	UW	9997	AT	UW
9098			9198	AT	UE	9298	RJ	NE	9398	RJ	AP	9498	CG	TN	9598	VI	UE	9698			9798	RJ	BR	9898	AT	GJ	9998	AT	GJ
9099	VI	GJ	9199	AT	BR	9299			9399			9499	CG	TN	9599	AT	DL	9699			9799	AT	RJ	9899	VI	DL	9999	VI	DL
8xxx Series
80 series			81 series			82 series			83 series			84 series			85 series			86 series			87 series			88 series			89 series		
8000	RJ		8100			8200	RJ	GJ	8300	CG	TN	8400	AT	UE	8500	CG	AP	8600	AT	MP	8700	RJ	DL	8800	AT	DL	8900	CG	WB
8001	VI	WB	8101			8201			8301	CG	KL	8401			8501	VI	AP	8601	VI	UE	8701			8801			8901	CG	HR
8002	AT	BR	8102	RJ	BR	8202			8302			8402	VI	AS	8502	VI	RJ	8602			8702			8802			8902	CG	KO
8003	AT	RJ	8103			8203			8303			8403	VI	AS	8503	VI	RJ	8603			8703			8803			8903	CG	TN
8004	CG	UE	8104	RJ	MU	8204			8304	CG	KL	8404	VI	BR	8504	VI	RJ	8604			8704			8804			8904		
8005	CG	UE	8105	AT	KA	8205			8305			8405	VI	BR	8505	VI	DL	8605	VI	MH	8705			8805	VI	MH	8905	AT	RJ
8006	VI	UW	8106	AT	AP	8206			8306			8406	VI	BR	8506	VI	DL	8606	VI	KL	8706			8806	VI	MH	8906		
8007	VI	MH	8107	AT	RJ	8207	VI	BR	8307	RJ	HR	8407	VI	BR	8507			8607	VI	HR	8707	RJ	UE	8807	AT	TN	8907		
8008	AT	AP	8108	VI	MU	8208	RJ	MH	8308	VI	MH	8408	VI	MH	8508			8608	VI	TN	8708	RJ	HR	8808	VI	UE	8908		
8009	AT	UE	8109			8209	RJ	RJ	8309	RJ	AP	8409	AT	BR	8509	RJ	WB	8609	VI	WB	8709	RJ	BR	8809	AT	BR	8909		
8010	RJ	MH	8110	AT	OR	8210	RJ	BR	8310	RJ	KA	8410			8510	VI	DL	8610	RJ	TN	8710			8810	RJ	DL	8910	RJ	KO
8011	AT	AS	8111	VI	KL	8211			8311			8411	VI	MH	8511	AT	GJ	8611			8711			8811	AT	AS	8911		
8012			8112	RJ	RJ	8212			8312			8412	VI	MH	8512	VI	DL	8612			8712			8812	AT	AS	8912		
8013			8113	VI	KL	8213			8313			8413	AT	NE	8513	VI	WB	8613			8713	VI	JK	8813	VI	HR	8913		
8014			8114	AT	OR	8214			8314			8414	AT	NE	8514	VI	WB	8614			8714	AT	KL	8814	VI	HR	8914		
8015			8115	AT	UE	8215			8315			8415	AT	NE	8515	VI	WB	8615			8715	VI	JK	8815	RJ	MP	8915		
8016	AT	WB	8116	AT	WB	8216			8316			8416	VI	UE	8516	VI	MP	8616			8716	VI	JK	8816	VI	HR	8916		
8017	VI	KO	8117	VI	TN	8217	RJ	KA	8317	VI	UW	8417			8517	VI	MP	8617	RJ	KO	8717	VI	MP	8817			8917	RJ	OR
8018	AT	OR	8118	RJ	RJ	8218	RJ	UW	8318	RJ	UE	8418	VI	UE	8518	VI	MP	8618	RJ	KA	8718	VI	MP	8818	VI	MP	8918	RJ	WB
8019			8119	AT	NE	8219	RJ	HP	8319	RJ	MP	8419	VI	MU	8519	VI	MP	8619	RJ	RJ	8719	VI	MP	8819	VI	MP	8919	RJ	AP
8020			8120	VI	MP	8220	AT	TN	8320	RJ	DL	8420	AT	KO	8520			8620			8720	VI	AS	8820			8920	RJ	DL
8021			8121	CG	DL	8221	VI	HR	8321			8421	AT	MH	8521	AT	BR	8621			8721	VI	AS	8821	VI	MP	8921	RJ	KL
8022			8122	AT	TN	8222	VI	HR	8322			8422	VI	MU	8522	AT	AP	8622			8722	VI	KA	8822			8922		
8023			8123			8223	VI	MP	8323			8423	AT	UE	8523	VI	TN	8623			8723	VI	AS	8823	VI	MP	8923	AT	UW
8024			8124	VI	TN	8224	VI	MP	8324			8424			8524	VI	TN	8624			8724	VI	AS	8824	RJ	RJ	8924		
8025			8125			8225	VI	MP	8325			8425	VI	MU	8525	VI	TN	8625			8725	VI	PB	8825	RJ	JK	8925		
8026			8126	AT	UW	8226	VI	MP	8326			8426	VI	RJ	8526			8626	AT	HP	8726	VI	UE	8826	AT	DL	8926		
8027			8127	AT	UE	8227	VI	BR	8327			8427	AT	PB	8527	AT	DL	8627	AT	HP	8727	VI	PB	8827	AT	MP	8927		
8028			8128	AT	GJ	8228	VI	BR	8328	RJ	AP	8428	AT	TN	8528	AT	UE	8628	AT	HP	8728	VI	PB	8828	VI	MU	8928	RJ	MU
8029			8129	AT	KL	8229	VI	BR	8329	RJ	MH	8429	AT	UE	8529	VI	HR	8629			8729	AT	NE	8829			8929	VI	DL
8030			8130	AT	DL	8230			8330	CG	KL	8430			8530	AT	MH	8630	RJ	UW	8730	AT	NE	8830	RJ	MH	8930	VI	HR
8031			8131	AT	NE	8231			8331	CG	AP	8431			8531	VI	TN	8631			8731	AT	NE	8831			8931		
8032			8132	AT	NE	8232			8332	CG	AP	8432	VI	MH	8532	AT	UW	8632			8732			8832			8932	VI	UE
8033			8133	AT	AS	8233			8333	CG	AP	8433	AT	MU	8533			8633			8733			8833			8933	VI	UE
8034			8134	AT	AS	8234			8334	VI	KO	8434	AT	BR	8534			8634			8734			8834			8934	VI	UE
8035			8135	AT	AS	8235			8335	VI	KO	8435	VI	MP	8535	VI	WB	8635			8735			8835			8935	VI	UE
8036			8136	AT	KL	8236			8336	VI	KO	8436	VI	WB	8536	VI	WB	8636			8736			8836		AP	8936	VI	UW
8037			8137	AT	KL	8237			8337	VI	KO	8437	VI	PB	8537	VI	WB	8637	RJ/VI	OR	8737			8837	RJ	NE/PB	8937	VI	UW
8038			8138	AT	KL	8238	VI	GJ	8338	VI	OR	8438			8538	AT	BR	8638	RJ	AS	8738			8838	RJ	TN	8938	VI	UW
8039			8139	VI	KA	8239	VI	RJ	8339	VI	OR	8439			8539	AT	BR	8639	RJ	AP	8739	VI	RJ	8839	RJ	MP	8939	VI	CH
8040			8140	VI	GJ	8240	RJ	KO	8340	RJ	BR	8440	VI	RJ	8540	AT	BR	8640			8740	VI	RJ	8840	RJ	UE	8940	VI	TN
8041			8141	VI	GJ	8241			8341	AT	AP	8441	VI	RJ	8541	AT	BR	8641			8741	VI	RJ	8841			8941	VI	UW
8042			8142	VI	AP	8242			8342	VI	OR	8442			8542			8642			8742	VI	DL	8842			8942	AT	WB
8043			8143			8243			8343	VI	WB	8443			8543	AT	UE	8643			8743	VI	DL	8843			8943	VI	KL
8044			8144	RJ	OR	8244			8344			8444			8544	CG	BR	8644			8744	VI	DL	8844			8944	AT	WB
8045			8145	VI	WB	8245			8345	VI	WB	8445	AT	UW	8545			8645			8745	VI	DL	8845			8945	AT	WB
8046			8146	AT	PB	8246			8346	VI	WB	8446		MH	8546	VI	KA	8646			8746	VI	KA	8846			8946		
8047			8147	AT	KA	8247	RJ	AP	8347	VI	GJ	8447	VI	DL	8547	CG	KL	8647			8747	VI	KA	8847	RJ	PB	8947		
8048			8148			8248	RJ	TN	8348	VI	KO	8448	AT	DL	8548	VI	RJ	8648			8748	VI	KA	8848	RJ	KL	8948	VI	UE
8049			8149			8249	RJ	OR	8349	AT	MP	8449	VI	UW	8549	VI	KA	8649			8749	VI	KA	8849	RJ	GJ	8949	RJ	RJ
8050			8150	VI	KA	8250	RJ	WB	8350	VI	HP	8450	AT	MU	8550	VI	KA	8650	VI	UW	8750	VI	DL	8850	RJ	MU	8950		
8051	VI	BR	8151	VI	KA	8251			8351	VI	HP	8451	AT	MU	8551	VI	MH	8651	VI	BR	8751			8851	RJ	DL	8951		
8052	VI	UE	8152	VI	KA	8252	RJ	BR	8352	VI	HP	8452	AT	MU	8552	VI	MH	8652	VI	MH	8752	CG	AP	8852			8952	AT	NE
8053	VI	HR	8153	VI	GJ	8253			8353			8453			8553			8653	AT	WB	8753	AT	AS	8853	AT	UE	8953	AT	UE
8054	VI	PB	8154	VI	GJ	8254			8354			8454	AT	MU	8554	VI	MH	8654			8754	AT	TN	8854			8954	VI	UE
8055	VI	MH	8155	VI	GJ	8255			8355	RJ	MU	8455	AT	OR	8555	RJ	AP	8655			8755	AT	UW	8855	AT	MH	8955		
8056	AT	TN	8156	VI	KL	8256	VI	NE	8356		MU	8456	AT	OR	8556	VI	PB	8656			8756	AT	UE	8856			8956	AT	MH
8057	VI	UW	8157	VI	KL	8257	VI	NE	8357	VI	MP	8457	CG	KL	8557	VI	PB	8657	VI	MH	8757	AT	BR	8857			8957		
8058	VI	RJ	8158	AT	WB	8258	VI	NE	8358	VI	MP	8458	VI	MP	8558	VI	PB	8658	AT	OR	8758	VI	GJ	8858	AT	UE	8958	VI	UW
8059	VI	HR	8159	AT	WB	8259	VI	NE	8359	VI	MP	8459	RJ	MH	8559			8659			8759			8859	VI	UW	8959	VI	MP
8060			8160	RJ	GJ	8260			8360	RJ	PB	8460			8560			8660	RJ	KA	8760			8860	VI	DL	8960		
8061			8161			8261			8361			8461	VI	MP	8561			8661			8761	AT	AS	8861	AT	KA	8961		
8062			8162			8262			8362			8462	VI	MP	8562			8662			8762	CC	KA	8862	AT	MH	8962		
8063			8163			8263			8363			8463	VI	AP	8563			8663			8763	CG	OR	8863	AT	BR	8963	VI	MP
8064			8164			8264	AT	PB	8364			8464	VI	AP	8564			8664			8764	CG	RJ	8864			8964	VI	MP
8065		KA	8165			8265			8365			8465	VI	AP	8565			8665			8765	CG	UE	8865			8965	VI	MP
8066			8166			8266			8366			8466	VI	AP	8566			8666			8766	RJ	DL	8866			8966	VI	MP
8067			8167	AT	WB	8267			8367	VI	AP	8467			8567			8667	RJ	TN	8767			8867			8967	AT	WB
8068			8168	RJ	HR	8268			8368	RJ	DL	8468			8568			8668	RJ	MH	8768	VI	WB	8868			8968	AT	PB
8069			8169	RJ	MU	8269	AT	MP	8369	RJ	MU	8469	VI	GJ	8569	AT	HR	8669	VI	MH	8769	AT	RJ	8869			8969	AT	BR
8070			8170	AT	WB	8270	AT	OR	8370	VI	WB	8470			8570	AT	HR	8670	AT	WB	8770	RJ	MP	8870	AT	TN	8970	VI	KA
8071		KA	8171	AT	UW	8271	AT	BR	8371	VI	WB	8471	AT	AS	8571	AT	HR	8671			8771			8871			8971	AT	KA
8072	RJ	TN	8172	AT	UE	8272			8372	VI	WB	8472	AT	AS	8572	AT	HR	8672			8772			8872	VI	PB	8972	AT	WB
8073	RJ	KA	8173	AT	UE	8273	AT	UW	8373	VI	DL	8473	AT	UW	8573	VI	UE	8673			8773			8873	VI	BR	8973		
8074	RJ	AP	8174	AT	UE	8274			8374	AT	AP	8474	VI	UW	8574	AT	UE	8674	VI	BR	8774			8874	VI	UE	8974	AT	NE
8075	RJ	KL	8175			8275	CG	MH	8375	VI	DL	8475	VI	UW	8575			8675			8775			8875	VI	RJ	8975	VI	MH
8076	RJ	DL	8176			8276			8376	VI	DL	8476	VI	UW	8576	VI	UE	8676	VI	BR	8776			8876	VI	AS	8976		
8077	RJ	UW	8177	AT	MH	8277	CG	KA	8377	VI	DL	8477	VI	UW	8577	VI	UW	8677	VI	BR	8777	RJ	KO	8877	VI	BR	8977		
8078	CG	KL	8178	RJ	DL	8278	CG	HR	8378	VI	MH	8478	VI	KO	8578	VI	BR	8678	VI	BR	8778	RJ	TN	8878	VI	MP	8978	AT	AP
8079	VI	OR	8179	AT	AP	8279	RJ	UW	8379	VI	MH	8479	VI	KO	8579	VI	BR	8679			8779	RJ	MU	8879	VI	MU	8979	AT	UW
8080			8180	AT	MH	8280	CG	OR	8380	VI	MH	8480	CG	OR	8580	CG	BR	8680	VI	TN	8780	RJ	GJ	8880	RJ	NE	8980	VI	GJ
8081	RJ	UE	8181			8281	CG	KL	8381			8481	VI	KO	8581	VI	BR	8681	VI	TN	8781			8881	VI	UE	8981		
8082		MU	8182			8282	AT	KO	8382			8482			8582	AT	KO	8682	VI	TN	8782			8882	RJ	DL	8982		
8083			8183			8283	AT	PB	8383	RJ	DL	8483	AT	MH	8583	AT	KO	8683	VI	HR	8783			8883			8983		
8084	AT	BR	8184	VI	AP	8284	AT	PB	8384	RJ	DL	8484	AT	MH	8584	AT	KO	8684	VI	HR	8784			8884	VI	KA	8984		
8085	AT	MP	8185	VI	AP	8285			8385			8485	AT	MH	8585	VI	DL	8685	VI	HR	8785			8885			8985	CG	AP
8086	VI	KL	8186	VI	AP	8286			8386			8486	VI	AS	8586	VI	DL	8686			8786			8886	VI	AP	8986	CG	BR
8087			8187	VI	AP	8287	RJ	DL	8387			8487			8587	VI	DL	8687			8787	RJ	MH	8887	RJ	UE	8987	CG	BR
8088			8188			8288	AT	PB	8388			8488			8588	VI	DL	8688			8788	RJ	MH	8888	VI	MH	8988	CG	HP
8089	AT	KL	8189	VI	TN	8289	AT	PB	8389			8489	VI	TN	8589	VI	KL	8689	VI	MU	8789	RJ	BR	8889	VI	MP	8989	CG	MP
8090			8190	VI	TN	8290	AT	RJ	8390	VI	MH	8490			8590	RJ	KL	8690	AT	RJ	8790	AT	AP	8890	AT	RJ	8990	RJ	PB
8091			8191	VI	UW	8291	AT	MU	8391			8491	AT	JK	8591	VI	KL	8691	VI	MU	8791			8891	AT	KL	8991	CG	MH
8092			8192	VI	UW	8292	AT	BR	8392	VI	UW	8492	AT	JK	8592	VI	KL	8692	VI	MU	8792			8892			8992	CG	PB
8093			8193	VI	UW	8293			8393	VI	UW	8493	AT	JK	8593	VI	KL	8693			8793			8893			8993	CG	RJ
8094	VI	RJ	8194	VI	PB	8294	AT	BR	8394	VI	UW	8494	VI	KA	8594	VI	OR	8694			8794	VI	NE	8894	AT	HP	8994	CG	TN
8095	VI	KA	8195	VI	PB	8295	AT	HR	8395	VI	UW	8495	VI	KA	8595	RJ	DL	8695	VI	WB	8795	VI	UE	8895	CG	OR	8995	CG	UW
8096	VI	AP	8196	VI	PB	8296	AT	KA	8396	VI	HR	8496	VI	KA	8596	VI	OR	8696	VI	RJ	8796	AT	DL	8896			8996		
8097			8197	AT	KA	8297	VI	AP	8397	VI	HR	8497	VI	KA	8597	AT	WB	8697	VI	KO	8797			8897	AT	AP	8997	AT	RJ
8098	VI	TN	8198	VI	PB	8298	VI	BR	8398	VI	HR	8498	VI	AP	8598	VI	OR	8698	VI	MH	8798			8898			8998		
8099			8199	VI	HR	8299	RJ	UE	8399	VI	AS	8499	VI	MU	8599	VI	OR	8699	AT	PB	8799			8899	AT	UW	8999	RJ	MH
7xxx series
70 series			71 series			72 series			73 series			74 series			75 series			76 series			77 series			78 series			79 series		
7000	RJ	MP	7100			7200			7300	AT	UW	7400	AT	MU	7500	VI	UW	7600	VI	GJ	7700	AT	BR	7800	VI	UE	7900	VI	UW
7001	RJ	WB	7101			7201	VI	GJ	7301			7401			7501			7601			7701	RJ	DL	7801			7901	CG	AP
7002	RJ	AS	7102	VI	KL	7202	VI	GJ	7302	AT	UW	7402			7502			7602	AT	WB	7702	AT	AP	7802			7902	VI	KL
7003	RJ	KO	7103	RJ	MH	7203	VI	GJ	7303	RJ	DL	7403			7503			7603			7703	RJ	DL	7803			7903	RJ	BR
7004	RJ	BR	7104			7204			7304	AT	MU	7404			7504			7604	RJ	TN	7704	RJ	AS	7804			7904	RJ	TN
7005	RJ	NE	7105			7205	AT	OR	7305	AT	TN	7405			7505	RJ	UW	7605	AT	OR	7705	RJ	AS	7805			7905	RJ	UE
7006	RJ	JK	7106			7206	AT	HR	7306	RJ	KL	7406	VI	KA	7506	VI	MU	7606	AT	OR	7706	RJ	AS	7806			7906	RJ	UW
7007	RJ	UE	7107			7207			7307	RJ	UE	7407	VI	WB	7507	VI	MH	7607	AT	UE	7707	VI	BR	7807	AT	HP	7907	RJ	KL
7008	RJ	OR	7108			7208	AT	MU	7308	AT	TN	7408	VI	UE	7508	VI	PB	7608	AT	OR	7708	AT	TN	7808	VI	BR	7908	RJ	WB
7009	RJ	PB	7109			7209			7309	VI	UE	7409	VI	UW	7509	VI	MP	7609	VI	UW	7709	AT	MH	7809		OR	7909	VI	MP
7010	RJ	TN	7110			7210			7310	AT	UW	7410	VI	RJ	7510	VI	KL	7610			7710	AT	MU	7810		TN	7910		
7011	RJ	DL	7111			7211			7311	VI	UE	7411			7511	VI	KL	7611			7711	RJ	AS	7811		TN	7911		
7012	RJ	KL	7112			7212			7312			7412	VI	RJ	7512			7612			7712	RJ	AS	7812		KA	7912		
7013	RJ	AP	7113			7213			7313			7413	VI	RJ	7513			7613			7713	RJ	AS	7813		KA	7913		
7014	RJ	RJ	7114			7214			7314			7414	VI	RJ	7514			7614			7714	RJ	AS	7814		PB	7914		
7015	RJ	HR	7115			7215			7315			7415			7515			7615			7715	RJ	AS	7815			7915		
7016	RJ	GJ	7116			7216			7316			7416			7516			7616			7716	RJ	AS	7816			7916		
7017	RJ	UW	7117			7217	RJ	DL	7317			7417			7517	VI	MH	7617	VI	MP	7717	RJ	BR	7817		GJ	7917		
7018	RJ	HP	7118			7218	VI	MH	7318			7418			7518	AT	UE	7618	VI	UE	7718	AT	MU	7818		GJ	7918		
7019	RJ	KA	7119			7219	AT	MH	7319	AT	BR	7419	RJ	HR	7519			7619	AT	KA	7719	VI	MH	7819		GJ	7919		
7020	RJ	MH	7120			7220			7320	AT	BR	7420			7520	VI	BR	7620	RJ	MH	7720	VI	MH	7820		RJ	7920		
7021	RJ	MU	7121			7221			7321	AT	BR	7421			7521	AT	UE	7621	VI	GJ	7721	VI	MH	7821		RJ	7921		
7022	AT	KA	7122			7222	AT	MP	7322	VI	BR	7422			7522	VI	MH	7622	VI	GJ	7722			7822		RJ	7922		
7023	AT	RJ	7123			7223	AT	MP	7323	VI	BR	7423			7523	AT	UE	7623	VI	GJ	7723			7823			7923		
7024	AT	MP	7124			7224	AT	MP	7324	VI	BR	7424	AT	RJ	7524	AT	UE	7624	AT	KA	7724			7824			7924		
7025	VI	KL	7125			7225	AT	MP	7325	AT	OR	7425	AT	RJ	7525	AT	UE	7625	AT	KA	7725	AT	RJ	7825			7925		
7026	VI	KA	7126			7226	AT	GJ	7326	AT	OR	7426	AT	RJ	7526	VI	PB	7626	CG	PB	7726	AT	RJ	7826			7926		
7027	VI	HR	7127			7227	AT	GJ	7327	AT	OR	7427	VI	WB	7527	VI	PB	7627	AT	NE	7727	AT	RJ	7827	RJ	DL	7927		
7028	AT	MH	7128			7228	AT	GJ	7328			7428			7528	VI	PB	7628	AT	NE	7728	AT	RJ	7828		MP	7928		
7029	RJ	WB	7129			7229	VI	RJ	7329	VI	RJ	7429	VI	AS	7529	VI	PB	7629	AT	NE	7729	VI	AP	7829	VI	KA	7929		
7030	VI	MH	7130			7230	VI	RJ	7330	AT	AP	7430	VI	WB	7530	AT	TN	7630	AT	NE	7730	VI	AP	7830	VI	UW	7930		
7031			7131			7231			7331			7431	VI	WB	7531	VI	RJ	7631	VI	BR	7731	VI	AP	7831	VI	HP	7931		
7032	AT	AP	7132			7232			7332	VI	UE	7432	VI	WB	7532			7632	AT	BR	7732	VI	AP	7832	VI	HP	7932		
7033	AT	BR	7133			7233			7333	VI	UE	7433	VI	GJ	7533	VI	UW	7633	AT	BR	7733	VI	RJ	7833	VI	HP	7933		
7034	VI	KL	7134			7234			7334	VI	UE	7434	VI	GJ	7534	VI	UW	7634	AT	BR	7734	VI	RJ	7834	VI	DL	7934		
7035			7135			7235			7335	VI	UE	7435	VI	GJ	7535	VI	UW	7635	AT	AS	7735			7835	VI	DL	7935		
7036	VI	AP	7136			7236			7336	VI	UE	7436	VI	OR	7536	VI	UW	7636	AT	AS	7736	AT	KL	7836	VI	DL	7936		
7037			7137			7237	VI	UE	7337	AT	KA	7437	VI	OR	7537			7637	AT	AS	7737	AT	RJ	7837	VI	PB	7937		
7038	VI	MH	7138	AT	TN	7238	VI	UE	7338	AT	KA	7438	VI	OR	7538	AT	TN	7638	VI	NE	7738	AT	MU	7838	VI	DL	7938		
7039	VI	MU	7139	CG	KA	7239	VI	RJ	7339	AT	RJ	7439			7539	AT	TN	7639	VI	TN	7739	AT	BR	7839	CG	UE	7939		
7040			7140			7240	VI	MP	7340	AT	PB	7440	VI	MP	7540	AT	TN	7640	VI	NE	7740	VI	RJ	7840	VI	DL	7940		
7041			7141			7241			7341			7441	VI	MP	7541	AT	BR	7641	VI	NE	7741	VI	MH	7841			7941		
7042	AT	DL	7142			7242			7342			7442			7542	AT	BR	7642	VI	NE	7742	AT	RJ	7842			7942		
7043	AT	GJ	7143			7243			7343			7443			7543	AT	BR	7643			7743	VI	MH	7843			7943		
7044	AT	KO	7144			7244			7344			7444			7544	VI	BR	7644			7744	VI	MH	7844			7944		
7045	VI	MU	7145			7245			7345			7445			7545	VI	BR	7645			7745	VI/VI	MH/MP	7845			7945		
7046	VI	GJ	7146			7246			7346			7446			7546	VI	BR	7646	CG	MP	7746	VI	MP	7846			7946		
7047	AT	WB	7147			7247			7347	AT	PB	7447	VI/VI	MP/MH	7547	VI	BR/WB	7647	CG	MP	7747	VI	MP	7847			7947		
7048	RJ	DL	7148			7248			7348	AT	KA	7448	VI	TN	7548		WB	7648	CG	MP	7748	VI	MP	7848			7948		
7049	VI	MP	7149			7249	VI	UW	7349	AT	KA	7449	VI	KO	7549		BR	7649	CG	HP	7749	AT	OR	7849			7949		
7050	AT	BR	7150			7250	AT	BR	7350	VI	MH	7450	VI	KO	7550		WB	7650	CG	HP	7750	AT	OR	7850			7950		
7051	AT	JK	7151			7251	VI	UW	7351	VI	UW	7451			7551		WB	7651	RJ	UE	7751	AT	OR	7851			7951		
7052	VI	UE	7152			7252	VI	UW	7352	VI	BR	7452			7552			7652	CG	HP	7752	AT	UE	7852		OR	7952		
7053			7153			7253	VI	UW	7353	VI	KA	7453			7553			7653	CG	OR	7753	AT	UE	7853			7953		
7054	AT	UE	7154			7254	VI	BR	7354	VI	MP	7454	AT	UW	7554			7654	VI	BR	7754	AT	UE	7854			7954		
7055	VI	UW	7155			7255	VI	BR	7355	RJ	UE	7455	AT	UW	7555			7655	CG	OR	7755	AT	UE	7855			7955		
7056	VI	HR	7156			7256	VI	BR	7356	AT	KL	7456	AT	UW	7556		MP	7656	CG	OR	7756	AT	MH	7856	RJ	BR	7956		
7057	VI	MH	7157			7257	VI	BR	7357	AT	RJ	7457	AT	UE	7557	VI	BR/WB	7657			7757	AT	MH	7857			7957		
7058			7158			7258	AT	BR	7358	AT	TN	7458	AT	UE	7558	VI	KL	7658	VI	AP	7758	AT	MH	7858			7958		
7059			7159			7259	AT	KA	7359	VI	GJ	7459	AT	UE	7559	VI	KL	7659	VI	AP	7759	AT	BR	7859			7959		
7060	AT	UW	7160			7260	AT	BR	7360	VI	BR	7460	AT	UE	7560	VI	KL	7660	VI	AP	7760	AT	KA	7860	VI	UE	7960		
7061	RJ	BR	7161			7261	AT	BR	7361	VI	BR	7461	AT	BR	7561	VI	AP	7661	VI	AP	7761	AT	BR	7861			7961		
7062			7162			7262	VI	MH	7362	VI	BR	7462	AT	BR	7562	VI	BR	7662	VI	AS	7762	AT	BR	7862			7962		
7063	AT	WB	7163			7263	VI	MH	7363	AT	WB	7463	AT	BR	7563	VI	BR	7663	VI	AS	7763	AT	BR	7863		WB	7963		
7064	VI	OR	7164			7264	VI	MH	7364	AT	WB	7464			7564	VI	BR	7664	VI	AS	7764	AT	BR	7864			7964		
7065	VI	DL	7165			7265	VI	GJ	7365	AT	WB	7465	VI	UW	7565	VI	UE	7665	VI	RJ	7765	AT	BR	7865			7965		
7066	VI	MH	7166			7266			7366	AT	BR	7466	VI	UW	7566	VI	MP	7666	RJ	MH	7766	AT	BR	7866			7966		
7067	RJ	MP	7167			7267			7367	AT	BR	7467			7567	VI	GJ	7667	RJ	BR	7767	VI	MH	7867	VI	TN	7967		
7068	AT	UE	7168			7268			7368	AT	BR	7468			7568	AT	RJ	7668	RJ	UE	7768	VI	MH	7868	VI	TN	7968		
7069	VI	GJ	7169			7269			7369	VI	BR	7469			7569		AP	7669	VI	DL	7769		MH	7869	AT	MP	7969		
7070	AT	BR	7170			7270			7370	VI	BR	7470	AT	MP	7570		UE	7670			7770	VI	MH	7870	AT	BR	7970		
7071	AC	UE	7171			7271			7371	VI	BR	7471	AT	MP	7571		UE	7671	RJ	AP	7771	VI	MP	7871	RJ	TN	7971		
7072	VI	GJ	7172			7272			7372	VI	RJ	7472			7572		GJ	7672	VI	BR	7772	VI	MP	7872	VI	WB	7972	RJ	MH
7073	AT	RJ	7173			7273			7373			7473			7573		GJ	7673	AT	AP	7773	VI	MH	7873	VI	OR	7973	RJ	PB
7074	VI	WB	7174			7274			7374	AT	RJ	7474	VI	GJ	7574		GJ	7674	AT	AP	7774	VI	MH	7874	VI	GJ	7974	RJ	MP
7075			7175			7275			7375	VI	RJ	7475			7575	VI	GJ/AS	7675	AT	AP	7775	VI	MH	7875	VI	MH	7975	RJ	KA
7076	VI	WB	7176			7276			7376	CG	UE	7476		RJ	7576		AS	7676	RJ	KA	7776	VI	MH	7876	RJ	HP	7976	RJ	RJ
7077	AT	OR	7177			7277			7377	VI	OR	7477	AT/AT	WB/MP	7577	VI	AS	7677			7777	AT	BR	7877	RJ	RJ	7977	RJ	MU
7078		UW	7178			7278			7378	VI	MH	7478	VI	WB	7578			7678	RJ	DL	7778			7878	RJ	RJ	7978	RJ	OR
7079	VI	BR	7179			7279			7379	VI	UE	7479			7579	CG	UW	7679			7779	AT	BR	7879	RJ	WB	7979	RJ	BR
7080	AT	UE	7180			7280	VI	BR	7380	CG	PB	7480			7580	VI	MP	7680	AT	AP	7780	VI	BR	7880	AT	UE	7980	RJ	KO
7081	VI	UE	7181			7281	VI	BR	7381	VI	OR	7481	AT	BR	7581	VI	MP	7681			7781	AT	BR	7881	AT	UE	7981	RJ	AP
7082	AT	HR	7182			7282	VI	BR	7382	CG	AP	7482	AT	BR	7582	VI	MP	7682	AT	OR	7782	AT	BR	7882			7982	RJ	DL
7083	VI	MH	7183			7283	VI	BR	7383	VI	GJ	7483	RJ	KA	7583	AT	WB	7683	AT	OR	7783			7883			7983	RJ	UW
7084	VI	UE	7184			7284	VI	GJ	7384	AT	WB	7484	AT	BR	7584	AT	WB	7684	AT	OR	7784			7884			7984	RJ	GJ
7085	AT	NE	7185			7285			7385	AT	MH	7485	AT	GJ	7585	AT	WB	7685			7785			7885			7985	RJ	UE
7086	AT	AS	7186			7286			7386			7486	AT	GJ	7586	AT	WB	7686			7786			7886			7986	RJ	PB
7087	AT	PB	7187			7287			7387	AT	MH	7487	AT	GJ	7587	CG	MP	7687			7787	VI	OR	7887	VI	MH	7987	RJ	MP
7088	VI	UW	7188			7288			7388	AT	UE	7488	RJ	BR	7588	CG	MH	7688	VI	RJ	7788	VI	AP	7888	RJ	PB	7988	RJ	HR
7089	VI	MP	7189			7289	VI	DL	7389	AT	MP	7489			7589	CG	PB	7689	VI	RJ	7789	RJ	JK	7889	RJ	JK	7989	RJ	AP
7090	VI	KA	7190			7290	VI	DL	7390	AT	UE	7490	AT	GJ	7590	VI	HP	7690	VI	RJ	7790			7890	VI	KO	7990	RJ	GJ
7091	AT	BR	7191			7291	VI	DL	7391	VI	MH	7491	VI	BR	7591	VI	KL	7691	VI	MP	7791			7891	VI	RJ	7991	RJ	BR
7092	VI	TN	7192			7292	VI	DL	7392			7492	VI	BR	7592	VI	KL	7692	VI	MP	7792			7892	RJ	KA	7992	RJ	BR
7093	AT	AP	7193			7293			7393			7493	VI	BR	7593	VI	KL	7693	VI	MP	7793			7893	AT	AP	7993	AT	AP
7094	VI	TN	7194			7294	AT	BR	7394			7494	VI	BR	7594	VI	KL	7694	VI	MP	7794			7894	AT	OR	7994	AT	KL
7095	VI	AP	7195			7295	AT	BR	7395	AT	TN	7495	AT	HR	7595	AT	KO	7695			7795			7895	AT	UW	7995	AT	AP
7096	VI	GJ	7196			7296	AT	RJ	7396	AT	AP	7496	AT	HR	7596	AT	KO	7696	AT	PB	7796	VI	MH	7896	AT	AS	7996	VI	KA
7097		AP	7197			7297	AT	RJ	7397	AT	MH	7497	AT	UE	7597	CG	RJ	7697	VI	MP	7797	VI	WB	7897	AT	UE	7997	VI	AP
7098			7198			7298			7398			7498			7598	CG	TN	7698	VI	GJ	7798	VI	MH	7898	AT	MP	7998		
7099		AS	7199			7299			7399			7499			7599	CG	UW	7699	VI	WB	7799	VI	AP	7899	AT	KA	7999	RJ	MP
6xxx Series
60 series			61 series			62 series			63 series			64 series			65 series			66 series			67 series			68 series			69 series		
6000	RJ	AS	6100			6200	RJ	BR	6300	RJ	AP	6400			6500			6600			6700			6800			6900		
6001	RJ	AS	6101			6201	RJ	BR	6301	RJ	AP	6401			6501			6601			6701			6801			6901	AT	AS
6002	RJ	AS	6102			6202	RJ	BR	6302	RJ	AP	6402			6502			6602			6702			6802			6902		
6003	RJ	TN	6103			6203	RJ	BR	6303	RJ	AP	6403			6503			6603			6703			6803			6903		
6004			6104			6204	RJ	BR	6304	RJ	AP	6404			6504			6604			6704			6804			6904		
6005	RJ	JK	6105			6205	RJ	BR	6305			6405			6505			6605			6705			6805			6905		
6006	RJ	JK	6106			6206	RJ	BR	6306	RJ	UE	6406			6506			6606			6706			6806			6906		
6007			6107			6207	RJ	BR	6307	RJ	UE	6407			6507			6607			6707			6807			6907		
6008			6108			6208	VI	BR	6308			6408			6508			6608			6708			6808			6908		
6009	RJ	NE	6109	AT	AP	6209	AT	BR	6309	AT	AP	6409			6509			6609			6709			6809			6909	AT	NE
6010			6110			6210			6310			6410			6510			6610			6710			6810			6910		
6011			6111			6211			6311			6411			6511			6611			6711			6811			6911		
6012			6112			6212			6312			6412			6512			6612			6712			6812			6912		
6013			6113			6213			6313			6413			6513			6613			6713			6813			6913	VI	AS
6014			6114			6214			6314			6414			6514			6614			6714			6814			6914		
6015			6115			6215			6315			6415			6515			6615			6715			6815			6915		
6016			6116			6216			6316			6416			6516			6616			6716			6816			6916		
6017			6117			6217			6317			6417			6517			6617			6717			6817			6917		
6018			6118			6218			6318			6418			6518			6618			6718			6818			6918		
6019			6119			6219			6319			6419			6519			6619			6719			6819			6919		
6020			6120			6220			6320			6420			6520			6620			6720			6820			6920		
6021			6121			6221			6321			6421			6521			6621			6721			6821			6921		
6022			6122			6222			6322			6422			6522			6622			6722			6822			6922		
6023			6123			6223			6323			6423			6523			6623			6723			6823			6923		
6024			6124			6224			6324			6424			6524			6624			6724			6824			6924		
6025			6125			6225			6325			6425			6525			6625			6725			6825			6925		
6026	CG	AS	6126			6226			6326			6426			6526			6626			6726			6826	CG	DL	6926		
6027			6127			6227			6327			6427			6527			6627			6727			6827			6927		
6028			6128			6228			6328			6428			6528			6628			6728			6828	CG	PB	6928		
6029			6129			6229			6329			6429			6529			6629			6729			6829			6929		
6030			6130			6230	AT	DL	6330			6430			6530			6630			6730			6830			6930		
6031			6131			6231			6331			6431			6531			6631			6731			6831			6931		
6032	CG	NE	6132			6232	AT	MP	6332			6432			6532			6632			6732			6832			6932		
6033			6133			6233			6333			6433			6533			6633			6733			6833			6933		
6034			6134			6234			6334			6434			6534			6634			6734			6834			6934		
6035			6135			6235	VI	KL	6335			6435			6535			6635			6735			6835			6935		
6036			6136			6236			6336			6436			6536			6636			6736			6836			6936		
6037			6137			6237			6337			6437			6537			6637			6737			6837			6937		
6038			6138			6238	RJ	KL	6338			6438			6538			6638			6738			6838			6938		
6039			6139			6239			6339			6439			6539			6639			6739			6839			6939		
6040			6140			6240			6340			6440			6540			6640			6740			6840			6940		
6041			6141			6241			6341			6441			6541			6641			6741			6841			6941		
6042			6142			6242			6342			6442			6542			6642			6742			6842			6942		
6043			6143			6243			6343			6443			6543			6643			6743			6843			6943		
6044			6144			6244			6344			6444			6544			6644			6744			6844			6944		
6045			6145			6245			6345			6445			6545			6645			6745			6845			6945		
6046			6146			6246			6346			6446			6546			6646			6746			6846			6946		
6047			6147			6247			6347			6447			6547			6647			6747			6847			6947		
6048			6148			6248			6348			6448			6548			6648			6748			6848			6948		
6049			6149			6249			6349			6449			6549			6649			6749			6849			6949		
6050			6150			6250			6350			6450			6550			6650			6750			6850			6950		
6051			6151			6251			6351	RJ	GJ	6451			6551			6651			6751			6851			6951		
6052			6152			6252			6352	RJ	GJ	6452			6552			6652			6752			6852			6952		
6053			6153			6253			6353	RJ	GJ	6453			6553			6653			6753			6853			6953		
6054			6154			6254			6354	RJ	GJ	6454			6554			6654			6754			6854			6954		
6055			6155			6255			6355	RJ	GJ	6455			6555			6655			6755			6855			6955		
6056			6156			6256			6356	VI	GJ	6456			6556			6656			6756			6856			6956		
6057			6157			6257			6357	VI	GJ	6457			6557			6657			6757			6857			6957		
6058			6158			6258			6358	AT	GJ	6458			6558			6658			6758			6858			6958		
6059			6159			6259			6359	VI	GJ	6459			6559			6659			6759			6859			6959		
6060			6160			6260	RJ	MP	6360	RJ	KA	6460			6560			6660			6760			6860			6960		
6061			6161			6261	RJ	MP	6361	RJ	KA	6461			6561			6661			6761			6861			6961		
6062			6162			6262	VI	MP	6362	RJ	KA	6462			6562			6662			6762			6862			6962		
6063			6163			6263	RJ	MP	6363	RJ	KA	6463			6563			6663			6763			6863			6963		
6064			6164			6264	RJ	MP	6364	AT	KA	6464			6564			6664			6764			6864			6964		
6065			6165			6265	RJ	MP	6365			6465			6565			6665			6765			6865			6965		
6066			6166			6266	RJ	MP	6366	AT	KA	6466			6566			6666			6766			6866			6966		
6067			6167			6267	RJ	MP	6367	RJ	RJ	6467			6567			6667			6767			6867			6967		
6068			6168			6268	RJ	MP	6368			6468			6568			6668			6768			6868			6968		
6069			6169			6269	VI	MP	6369	RJ	TN	6469			6569			6669			6769			6869			6969		
6070			6170			6270			6370	RJ	OR	6470			6570			6670			6770			6870			6970		
6071			6171			6271			6371	RJ	OR	6471			6571			6671			6771			6871			6971		
6072			6172			6272			6372	RJ	OR	6472			6572			6672			6772			6872			6972		
6073			6173			6273			6373			6473			6573			6673			6773			6873			6973		
6074			6174			6274			6374	RJ	TN	6474			6574			6674			6774			6874			6974		
6075			6175			6275			6375	RJ	RJ	6475			6575			6675			6775			6875			6975		
6076			6176			6276			6376	RJ	RJ	6476			6576			6676			6776			6876			6976		
6077			6177			6277			6377	RJ	RJ	6477			6577			6677			6777			6877			6977		
6078			6178			6278			6378	RJ	RJ	6478			6578			6678			6778			6878			6978		
6079			6179			6279			6379	RJ	TN	6479			6579			6679			6779			6879			6979		
6080			6180			6280	RJ	PB	6380	RJ	TN	6480			6580			6680			6780			6880			6980		
6081			6181			6281			6381	RJ	TN	6481			6581			6681			6781			6881			6981		
6082			6182			6282	RJ	KL	6382	RJ	TN	6482			6582			6682			6782			6882			6982		
6083			6183			6283	RJ	PB	6383	RJ	TN	6483			6583			6683			6783			6883			6983		
6084			6184			6284	RJ	PB	6384	VI	TN	6484			6584			6684			6784			6884			6984		
6085			6185			6285			6385	AT	TN	6485			6585			6685			6785			6885			6985		
6086			6186			6286			6386	RJ	UE	6486			6586			6686			6786			6886			6986		
6087			6187			6287	AT	BR	6387	RJ	UE	6487			6587			6687			6787			6887			6987		
6088			6188			6288			6388	RJ	UE	6488			6588			6688			6788			6888			6988		
6089			6189			6289	RJ	KO	6389	VI	UE	6489			6589			6689			6789			6889			6989		
6090			6190			6290	RJ	KO	6390			6490			6590			6990			6790			6890			6990		
6091			6191			6291	RJ	KO	6391	VI	UE	6491			6591			6691			6791			6891			6991		
6092			6192			6292	VI	KO	6392	RJ	UE	6492			6592			6692			6792			6892			6992		
6093			6193			6293	VI	KO	6393	RJ	UE	6493			6593			6693			6793			6893			6993		
6094			6194			6294	RJ	WB	6394	RJ	UE	6494			6594			6694			6794			6894			6994		
6095			6195			6295	RJ	WB	6395			6495			6595			6695			6795			6895			6995		
6096			6196			6296	RJ	WB	6396	RJ	UW	6496			6596			6696			6796			6896			6996		
6097			6197			6297			6397	RJ	UW	6497			6597			6697			6797			6897			6997		
6098			6198			6298			6398	RJ	UW	6498			6598			6698			6798			6898			6998		
6099			6199			6299			6399	VI	UW	6499			6599			6699			6799			6899			6999		⟨⟨⟨⟩⟩⟩

== See also ==
- Digital India
- Internet in India
- Telecommunications in India
- List of mobile phone brands by country
- List of countries by Internet connection speeds
- List of countries by smartphone penetration
