= NIFTY 50 =

Indian stock market index

Nifty 50

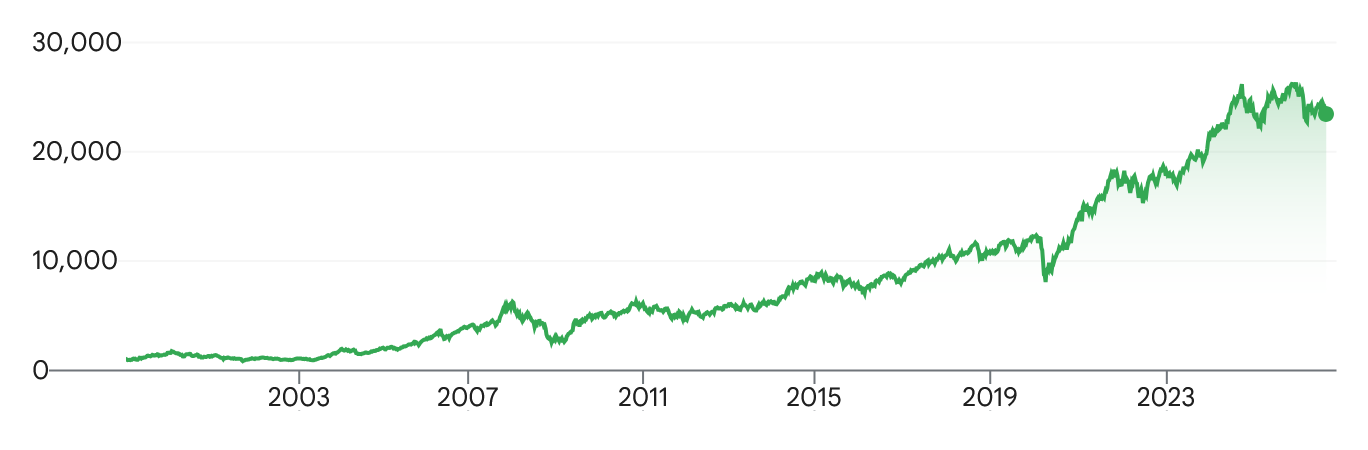
- Performance of the NIFTY 50 index between 1990 and 2026
- Foundation: 22 April 1996 (30 years ago)
- Operator: NSE Indices
- Exchanges: NSE
- Trading symbol: ^NSEI
- Constituents: 50
- Type: Large cap
- Market cap: ₹194.2 lakh crore (US$2.1 trillion) (14 July 2026)
- Weighting method: Free-float capitalization-weighted
- Related indices: NIFTY Next 50; NIFTY 500
- Website: www.niftyindices.com/indices/equity/broad-based-indices/nifty--50

The NIFTY 50 is an Indian stock market index that represents the float-weighted average of 50 of the largest Indian companies listed on the National Stock Exchange (NSE). Nifty 50 is owned and managed by NSE Indices, which is a wholly owned subsidiary of the NSE. The Nifty 50 index was launched on 22 April 1996 with a base date of 3 November 1995 and with 1,000 as its base value.

The NIFTY 50 is widely regarded as the benchmark index of the Indian equity market and is commonly used to measure the overall performance of large-cap Indian stocks. Because its constituents represent companies from 13 sectors of the Indian economy, the index serves as a reference for investors, fund managers, and financial analysts when evaluating market trends and portfolio performance.

The NIFTY 50 index ecosystem consists of index funds (both onshore and offshore mutual funds and ETFs), and futures and options at NSE and NSE International Exchange (through GIFT Nifty). In 2016, NIFTY 50 was reported by the WFE and FIA as the world's most actively traded index options contract, but it was later overtaken by Nifty Bank. In 2024, NIFTY 50 overtook Nifty Bank after the latter's weekly expiry contracts were discontinued.

As of August 2026, NIFTY 50 gives a weightage of 36.47% to financial services including banking, 9.52% to oil and gas, 8.48% to information technology, 7.06% to automotive, and 5.41% to fast moving consumer goods.

== Methodology ==
The NIFTY 50 index is a free float market capitalisation-weighted index.

Stocks are added to the index based on the following criteria:

1. Must have traded at an average impact cost of 0.50% or less during the last six months for 90% of the observations, for the basket size of Rs. 100 million.
2. The company should have a listing history of 6 months.
3. Companies that are allowed to trade in F&O segment are only eligible to be constituent of the index.
4. The company should have a minimum listing history of 1 month as on the cutoff date

The index was initially calculated on a full market capitalization methodology. On 26 June 2009, the computation was changed to a free-float methodology. The base period for the NIFTY 50 index is 3 November 1995, which marked the completion of one year of operations of the equity market segment on NSE. The base value of the index has been set at 1,000 and a base capital of ₹2.06 trillion.

The index is re-balanced on semi-annual basis. The cut-off date is 31 January and 31 July every year; further, average data for the previous six months from the cut-off date is considered to filter stocks. A notice of 4 weeks from the date of change is given to market participants so that they can prepare for any changes.

== Constituents ==
The Nifty 50 has the following constituents, as of 8 December 2025.

Company name	Symbol	Sector	Date added
Adani Enterprises	ADANIENT	Metals & Mining	30 September 2022
Adani Ports & SEZ	ADANIPORTS	Services	28 September 2015
Apollo Hospitals	APOLLOHOSP	Healthcare	31 March 2022
Asian Paints	ASIANPAINT	Consumer Durables	27 April 2012 (Note: Asian Paints was also a constituent of Nifty 50 from 18 September 1996 to 28 October 2002)
Axis Bank	AXISBANK	Financial Services	27 March 2009
Bajaj Auto	BAJAJ-AUTO	Automobile and Auto Components	1 October 2010 (Note: Bajaj Auto was also a constituent of Nifty 50 from 22 April 1996 to 14 March 2008)
Bajaj Finance	BAJFINANCE	Financial Services	29 September 2017
Bajaj Finserv	BAJAJFINSV	Financial Services	2 April 2018
Bharat Electronics	BEL	Capital Goods	30 September 2024
Bharti Airtel	BHARTIARTL	Telecommunication	1 March 2004
BSE	BSE	Financial Services	30 September 2026
Cipla	CIPLA	Healthcare	7 October 1998
Coal India	COALINDIA	Oil, Gas & Consumable Fuels	10 October 2011
Dr. Reddy's Laboratories	DRREDDY	Healthcare	1 October 2010 (Note: Dr. Reddy's Laboratories was also a constituent of Nifty 50 from 22 April 1996 to 14 May 1997 and from 26 May 1999 to 10 September 2008)
Eicher Motors	EICHERMOT	Automobile and Auto Components	1 April 2016
Eternal	ETERNAL	Consumer Services	28 March 2025
Grasim Industries	GRASIM	Construction Materials	2 April 2018 (Note: Grasim Industries was also a constituent of Nifty 50 from 22 April 1996 to 8 April 2010 and from 25 March 2011 to 26 May 2017)
HCLTech	HCLTECH	Information Technology	28 October 2002
HDFC Bank	HDFCBANK	Financial Services	22 April 1996
HDFC Life	HDFCLIFE	Financial Services	31 July 2020
Hindalco Industries	HINDALCO	Metals & Mining	22 April 1996
Hindustan Unilever	HINDUNILVR	Fast Moving Consumer Goods	22 April 1996
ICICI Bank	ICICIBANK	Financial Services	25 January 2002
IndiGo	INDIGO	Services	30 September 2025
Infosys	INFY	Information Technology	7 October 1998
ITC	ITC	Fast Moving Consumer Goods	22 April 1996
Jio Financial Services	JIOFIN	Financial Services	28 March 2025
JSW Steel	JSWSTEEL	Metals & Mining	28 September 2018
Kotak Mahindra Bank	KOTAKBANK	Financial Services	8 April 2010
Larsen & Toubro	LT	Construction	10 December 2004 (Note: Larsen & Toubro was also a constituent of Nifty 50 from 22 April 1996 to 24 May 2004)
Mahindra & Mahindra	M&M	Automobile and Auto Components	18 September 1996
Maruti Suzuki	MARUTI	Automobile and Auto Components	1 March 2004
Max Healthcare	MAXHEALTH	Healthcare	30 September 2025
Nestlé India	NESTLEIND	Fast Moving Consumer Goods	27 September 2019 (Note: Nestlé India was also a constituent of Nifty 50 from 18 September 1996 to 4 August 2003)
NTPC	NTPC	Power	24 September 2007
Oil and Natural Gas Corporation	ONGC	Oil, Gas & Consumable Fuels	12 April 2004
Power Grid	POWERGRID	Power	14 March 2008
Reliance Industries	RELIANCE	Oil, Gas & Consumable Fuels	22 April 1996
SBI Life Insurance Company	SBILIFE	Financial Services	25 September 2020
Shriram Finance	SHRIRAMFIN	Financial Services	28 March 2024
State Bank of India	SBIN	Financial Services	22 April 1996
Sun Pharma	SUNPHARMA	Healthcare	17 January 2002
Tata Consultancy Services	TCS	Information Technology	25 February 2005
Tata Consumer Products	TATACONSUM	Fast Moving Consumer Goods	31 March 2021 (Note: Tata Consumer Products was also a constituent of Nifty 50 from 22 April 1996 to 1 September 2006)
Tata Motors Passenger Vehicles	TMPV	Automobile and Auto Components	22 April 1996
Tata Steel	TATASTEEL	Metals & Mining	22 April 1996
Tech Mahindra	TECHM	Information Technology	28 March 2014
Titan Company	TITAN	Consumer Durables	2 April 2018
Trent	TRENT	Consumer Services	30 September 2024
UltraTech Cement	ULTRACEMCO	Construction Materials	28 September 2012

== Index changes ==
Changes in index constituents since Nifty 50 since 2005:

List of replacements since 2005
Constituent excluded	Constituent included	Date of replacement	Reason for exclusion	Ref
Indian Hotels Company	Tata Consultancy Services	25 February 2005	Inadequate market capitalization	
Colgate-Palmolive India	Jet Airways	26 September 2005	Inadequate market capitalization	
Shipping Corporation of India	Siemens India	27 June 2006	Inadequate market capitalization	
Tata Chemicals	Suzlon	27 June 2006	Inadequate market capitalization	
Tata Tea	Reliance Communications	1 September 2006	Inadequate market capitalization	
Jet Airways	Reliance Petroleum	4 April 2007	Inadequate market capitalization	
Oriental Bank of Commerce	Sterlite Industries	4 April 2007	Inadequate market capitalization	
Dabur	NTPC	24 September 2007	Inadequate market capitalization	
IPCL	Unitech	5 October 2007	Merger	
Hindustan Petroleum	Cairn India	12 December 2007	Inadequate market capitalization	
MTNL	Idea Cellular	12 December 2007	Inadequate market capitalization	
Bajaj Auto	DLF	14 March 2008	Demerger	
GlaxoSmithKline Pharmaceuticals	Power Grid	14 March 2008	Inadequate market capitalization	
Dr. Reddy's Laboratories	Reliance Power	10 September 2008	Inadequate market capitalization	
Satyam Computer Services	Reliance Capital	12 January 2009	Corporate scandal	
Zee Entertainment Enterprises	Axis Bank	27 March 2009	Inadequate market capitalization	
Reliance Petroleum	Jindal Steel & Power	17 June 2009	Merger	
NALCO	IDFC	20 October 2009	Inadequate market capitalization	
Tata Communications	Jaiprakash Associates	20 October 2009	Inadequate market capitalization	
Grasim Industries	Kotak Mahindra Bank	8 April 2010	Demerger	
ABB India	Bajaj Auto	1 October 2010	Inadequate market capitalization	
Idea Cellular	Dr. Reddy's Laboratories	1 October 2010	Inadequate market capitalization	
Unitech	Sesa Goa	1 October 2010	Inadequate market capitalization	
Suzlon	Grasim Industries	25 March 2011	Inadequate market capitalization	
Reliance Capital	Coal India	10 October 2011	Inadequate market capitalization	
Reliance Communications	Asian Paints	27 April 2012	Inadequate market capitalization	
Reliance Power	Bank of Baroda	27 April 2012	Inadequate market capitalization	
Steel Authority of India	Lupin	28 September 2012	Inadequate market capitalization	
Sterlite Industries	UltraTech Cement	28 September 2012	Inadequate market capitalization	
Siemens India	IndusInd Bank	1 April 2013	Inadequate market capitalization	
Wipro	NMDC	1 April 2013	Demerger	
Reliance Infrastructure	Wipro	27 September 2013	Inadequate market capitalization	
JP Associates	Tech Mahindra	28 March 2014	Inadequate market capitalization	
Ranbaxy Laboratories	United Spirits	28 March 2014	Inadequate market capitalization	
United Spirits	Zee Entertainment Enterprises	19 September 2014	Exclusion from F&O segment	
DLF	Idea Cellular	27 March 2015	Inadequate market capitalization	
Jindal Steel & Power	Yes Bank	27 March 2015	Inadequate market capitalization	
IDFC	Bosch India	29 May 2015	Demerger	
NMDC	Adani Ports & SEZ	28 September 2015	Inadequate market capitalization	
Cairn India	Aurobindo Pharma	1 April 2016	Merger	
Punjab National Bank	Bharti Infratel	1 April 2016	Inadequate market capitalization	
Vedanta	Eicher Motors	1 April 2016	Merger	
BHEL	Indiabulls Housing Finance	31 March 2017	Inadequate market capitalization	
Idea Cellular	Indian Oil Corporation	31 March 2017	Inadequate market capitalization	
Grasim Industries	Vedanta	26 May 2017	Demerger	
ACC	Bajaj Finance	29 September 2017	Inadequate market capitalization	
Bank of Baroda	Hindustan Petroleum	29 September 2017	Inadequate market capitalization	
Tata Power	UPL	29 September 2017	Inadequate market capitalization	
Ambuja Cements	Bajaj Finserv	2 April 2018	Inadequate market capitalization	
Aurobindo Pharma	Grasim Industries	2 April 2018	Inadequate market capitalization	
Bosch India	Titan Company	2 April 2018	Inadequate market capitalization	
Lupin	JSW Steel	28 September 2018	Inadequate market capitalization	
Hindustan Petroleum	Britannia Industries	29 March 2019	Inadequate market capitalization	
Indiabulls Housing Finance	Nestlé India	27 September 2019	Inadequate market capitalization	
Yes Bank	Shree Cement	19 March 2020	Reconstruction scheme	
Vedanta	HDFC Life	31 July 2020	Proposed delisting	
Zee Entertainment Enterprises	SBI Life Insurance Company	25 September 2020	Inadequate market capitalization	
Bharti Infratel	Divi's Laboratories	25 September 2020	Merger	
GAIL	Tata Consumer Products	31 March 2021	Inadequate market capitalization	
Indian Oil Corporation	Apollo Hospitals	31 March 2022	Inadequate market capitalization	
Shree Cement	Adani Enterprises	30 September 2022	Inadequate market capitalization	
HDFC	LTIMindtree	13 July 2023	Merger	
UPL	Shriram Finance	28 March 2024	Inadequate market capitalization	
Divi's Laboratories	Bharat Electronics	30 September 2024	Inadequate market capitalization	
LTIMindtree	Trent	30 September 2024	Inadequate market capitalization	
Bharat Petroleum	Jio Financial Services	28 March 2025	Inadequate market capitalization	
Britannia Industries	Eternal	28 March 2025	Inadequate market capitalization	
Hero MotoCorp	IndiGo	30 September 2025	Inadequate market capitalization	
IndusInd Bank	Max Healthcare	30 September 2025	Inadequate market capitalization	
Wipro	BSE	30 September 2026		

== Statistics ==
=== Record values ===
Category	All-time highs	
Category	Value	Date
Closing	26,328.55	Friday, 2 January 2026
Intraday	26,340.00	Friday, 2 January 2026

Milestones

Milestone value	First touch
1,000	2 December 1999
2,000	2 December 2004
3,000	30 January 2006
4,000	1 December 2006
5,000	27 September 2007
10,000	25 July 2017
15,000	5 February 2021
20,000	11 September 2023
25,000	1 August 2024
26,000	24 September 2024

=== Major single day falls ===
The following table lists some of the notable single-day falls of the NIFTY 50 index.

Date	Fall	Probable reason
31 March 1997	89.50 points (8.46%)	Congress withdraws support to the United Front coalition government.
28 October 1997	88.20 points (7.87%)	Asian financial crisis.
17 April 1999	77.50 points (7.42%)	Vajpayee loses a no-confidence motion by one vote after AIADMK withdraws support to the NDA coalition government.
4 April 2000	106.65 points (6.90%)	Dot-com bubble burst.
14 May 2004	135.10 points (7.87%)	2004 Indian general election results.
17 May 2004	196.90 points (12.24%)	2004 Indian general election results.
21 January 2008	496.50 points (8.70%)	US subprime mortgage crisis.
22 January 2008	309.50 points (5.94%)	US subprime mortgage crisis.
24 October 2008	386 points (13.11%)	Global financial crisis.
7 January 2009	192.40 points (6.18%)	Satyam scandal.
6 July 2009	258.55 points (5.84%)	Union budget announcement.
24 August 2015	490.95 points (5.92%)	Chinese stock market crash.
12 March 2020	868.25 points (8.30%)	COVID-19 pandemic; WHO declares it a pandemic.
16 March 2020	757.80 points (7.61%)	COVID-19 pandemic.
23 March 2020	1,135.20 points (12.98%)	COVID-19 pandemic.
4 June 2024	1,379.40 points (5.93%)	The incumbent government secured fewer seats in the 2024 Indian general elections than was predicted by the exit polls.

=== Major single day gains ===
The following table lists some of the notable single-day gains of the NIFTY 50 index.

Date	Gain	Probable reason
18 May 2009	651.50 points (17.74%)	2009 Indian general election results caused multiple trading curbs.
20 September 2019	655.45 points (6.12%)	Announcement of corporate tax rate cuts.
25 March 2020	516.80 points (6.62%)	US Senate passes a $2.2 trillion economic stimulus bill in response to the COVID-19 pandemic.
7 April 2020	708.40 points (8.76%)	Indications that COVID-19 cases were easing around the world.
1 February 2021	646.60 points (4.74%)	Union budget announcement.

=== Annual returns ===
The following table shows the annual development of the NIFTY 50 since 2000. The historical daily returns data can be accessed from the NSE website.

Year	Closing level	Change in Index in Points	Change in Index in %
2000	1,263.55	−216.90	−14.65
2001	1,059.05	−204.50	−13.94
2002	1,093.50	34.45	3.25
2003	1,879.75	786.25	71.90
2004	2,080.50	200.75	10.68
2005	2,836.55	756.05	36.34
2006	3,966.40	1,129.85	39.83
2007	6,138.60	2,172.20	54.77
2008	2,959.15	−3,179.45	−51.79
2009	5,201.05	2,241.90	75.76
2010	6,134.50	933.45	17.95
2011	4,624.30	−1,510.20	−24.62
2012	5,905.10	1,280.80	27.70
2013	6,304.00	398.90	6.76
2014	8,282.70	1,978.70	31.39
2015	7,964.35	−336.35	−4.06
2016	8,185.80	239.45	3.01
2017	10,530.70	2,344.90	28.65
2018	10,862.55	331.85	3.15
2019	12,168.45	1,305.90	12.02
2020	13,981.75	1,813.30	14.90
2021	17,354.05	3,372.30	24.12
2022	18,105.30	751.25	4.33
2023	21,731.40	3,621.10	20.03
2024	23,644.80	1,913.40	8.80
2025	26129.60	2484.80	10.51

== Derivatives ==
Trading in futures and options on the NIFTY 50 is offered by the NSE and NSE International Exchange (NSEIX). NSE offers weekly as well as monthly expiry options.

NSE allows international traders to trade on the NIFTY 50 by GIFT NIFTY. The same index had previously operated under the name SGX Nifty, and was traded on the Singapore Exchange. It was rebranded to GIFT Nifty on 3 July 2023; trading was then moved to the NSE International Exchange (NSEIX), situated in GIFT City, Gandhinagar. The CEO of NSEIX called it a watershed moment since it was the first time India got back an international contract which had previously been exported.

== NIFTY Next 50 ==
NIFTY Next 50, also called NIFTY Junior, is an index of 50 companies whose free float market capitalisation comes after that of the companies in NIFTY 50. NIFTY Next 50 constituents are thus potential candidates for future inclusion in NIFTY 50.

== See also ==
- GIFT Nifty
- NSE Indices
- BSE SENSEX
- List of companies listed on the National Stock Exchange of India
