= GIFT Nifty =

Futures contract on Nifty 50 index

- Foundation: 25 September 2000 (as SGX Nifty) 3 July 2023 (as GIFT Nifty)
- Operator: NSE
- Exchanges: NSE IX
- Related indices: NIFTY 50
- Website: www.nseix.com

GIFT Nifty is an Indian stock market index derivative product that serves as an indicator for NSE's benchmark index NIFTY 50. Earlier known as SGX Nifty, it was rebranded and shifted from SGX to the NSE International Exchange (NSE IX) in GIFT City, Gujarat in 2023. SGX Nifty started trading on 25 September 2000; trading under the new name began on 3 July 2023.

GIFT Nifty had a monthly turnover of US$100.7 billion in September 2024. It recorded its highest single day turnover of US$22.7 billion on 24 September 2024.

== Background ==
The SGX Nifty had long been a key indicator for India's domestic stock market indices. The transition to GIFT Nifty was part of a broader strategy to centralize international financial services in GIFT City, a hub for India's financial sector and a key initiative under the Smart Cities Mission started by Prime Minister Narendra Modi.

== Operational details ==
GIFT Nifty operates in two trading sessions. The first session runs from 6:30 am to 3:40 pm IST, and the second session is from 4:35 pm to 2:45 am IST. This extended trading window aims to align with international market timings.

== See also ==
- India International Exchange
- NSE Indices
