= UltraTech Cement =

Indian cement company

UltraTech Cement Limited
- Logo of UltraTech Cement
- Type: Public
- Traded as: BSE: 532538; NSE: ULTRACEMCO; BSE SENSEX constituent; NSE NIFTY 50 constituent
- ISIN: INE481G01011
- Industry: Building materials
- Founded: 1983; 43 years ago
- Headquarters: Mumbai, Maharashtra, India
- Key people: Kumar Mangalam Birla (chairman); K. C. Jhanwar (managing director); Vivek Agarwal (director)
- Products: Cement
- Revenue: ▲₹89,089 crore (US$9.3 billion) (2026)
- Operating income: ▲₹11,081 crore (US$1.2 billion) (2026)
- Net income: ▲₹8,166 crore (US$850 million) (2026)
- Total assets: ▲₹141,376 crore (US$15 billion) (2026)
- Total equity: ▲₹76,623 crore (US$8.0 billion) (2026)
- Owner: Grasim Industries (56.11%)
- Number of employees: 27,930 (permanent) (March 2025)
- Parent: Aditya Birla Group
- Website: www.ultratechcement.com
- Footnotes; Financials as of 31 March 2025.

UltraTech Cement Limited is an Indian multinational cement company based in Mumbai. It is the largest manufacturer of grey cement, ready-mix concrete (RMC) and white cement in India, and the fifth largest in the world, with an installed capacity of 152.70 million tonnes per annum and 119 million tonnes per annum sales volume.

== History ==
UltraTech Cement traces its origins to 1983 when it began as the cement division of Larsen & Toubro (L&T), being sold under the "L&T Cement" brand. In 2000, L&T decided to sell its cement business and incorporated a wholly owned subsidiary to house the cement assets.

In 2001, Reliance Industries sold its entire 10% stake in L&T to Grasim Industries. At the time, L&T was the largest cement manufacturer in India, while Grasim was the third-largest. In 2002, Grasim would increase its stake in L&T to 15% and its attempt to launch an open offer to acquire an additional 20% stake was stayed by the SEBI over a possible violation of takeover rules.

In 2003, L&T announced that it would demerge the cement business into a company called UltraTech CemCo. As part of the demerger plan, Grasim agreed to acquire an 8.5% stake in UltraTech CemCo from L&T, make an open offer to acquire another 30%, and transfer its 15% stake in L&T (residual engineering company) to L&T Employees Welfare Foundation. The deal was executed in 2004, with Grasim obtaining management control of UltraTech CemCo (later renamed as UltraTech Cement) with its 51% stake, while L&T retained 11.5% shareholding.

== Mergers and acquisitions ==
2013 - Acquired Jaypee Group's Gujarat cement unit for ₹3,800 cr.

2017 - Acquired Jaiprakash Associates's six integrated cement plants for ₹16,189 cr.

2018 - Entered into a scheme of arrangement with Century Textile and Industries to demerge Century's cement business into ultratech.

Nov 2018 - Acquired Binani Cement for ₹7,266 cr.

Dec 2023 - Acquired Cement grinding assets of Burnpur Cement Ltd. From Punjab National Bank's Asset Reconstruction Company's auction for cash consideration of ₹169.79 crore (US$18 million).

Dec 2024 - Acquired majority stake in India Cements for ₹7096.35 cr.

== Controversies ==
In January 2022, one worker died and two others were injured in the company's plant at Jafrabad, Gujarat, after hot liquid raw material fell on them while cleaning a silo during a plant shutdown.

In July 2023, three workers died in an oxygen cylinder explosion at UltraTech Cement's plant in Hirmi, Chhattisgarh. In June 2024, a worker died after getting trapped in the belt of a machine at the Manawar factory in Madhya Pradesh.

In July 2024, three workers died and 13 suffered burn injuries after hot mortar fell on them due to a boiler explosion at the company's factory near Jaggayyapeta, Andhra Pradesh, prompting the state government to issue a closure notice to the factory pending conclusion of an investigation.

== See also ==
- Ambuja Cements
- Shree Cement
- Cement industry
- Aditya Birla Group
