= NIFTY Next 50 =

Indian stock market index

NSE NIFTY NEXT 50

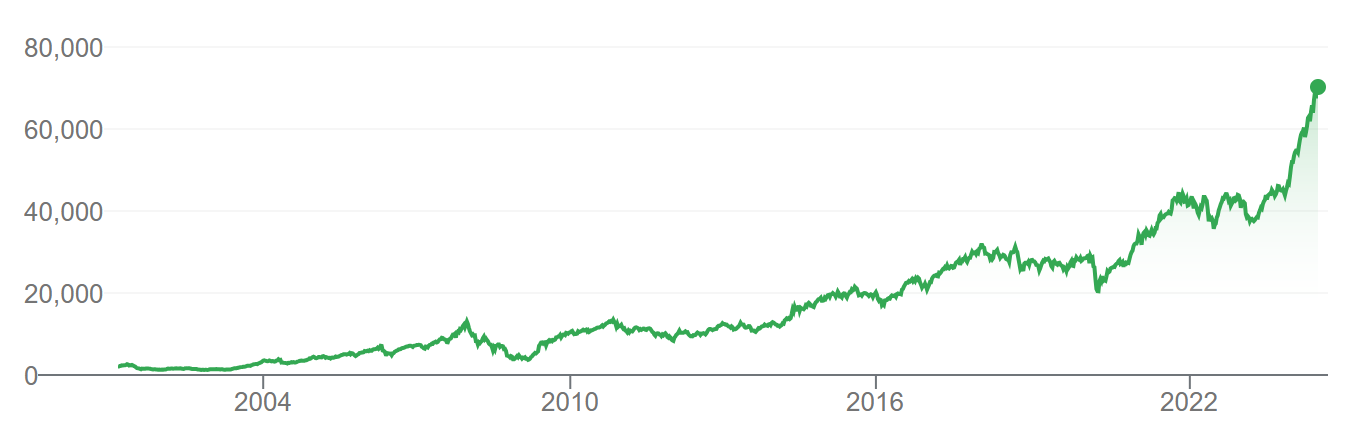
- Performance of NIFTY Next 50 between 2000 and 2024
- Foundation: 24 December 1996 (29 years ago)
- Operator: NSE Indices
- Exchanges: NSE
- Trading symbol: ^NIFTYJR
- Constituents: 50
- Type: Large cap
- Weighting method: Capitalisation-weighted
- Related indices: NIFTY 50; NIFTY 500
- Website: www.nseindia.com/products-services/indices-niftynext50-index

The NIFTY Next 50 is an Indian stock market index provided and maintained by NSE Indices. It represents the next rung of liquid securities after the NIFTY 50. It consists of 50 companies representing approximately 10% of the traded value of all stocks on the National Stock Exchange of India. It is quoted using the symbol NIFTYJR.

The NIFTY Next 50 and the NIFTY 50 together comprise the NIFTY 100, which represents the top 100 companies trading on the National Stock Exchange of India based on full market capitalisation. The Nifty Next 50 Index represents 50 companies from Nifty 100 after excluding the Nifty 50 companies.

The Nifty Next 50 Index represents about 10% of the free float market capitalization of the stocks listed on NSE as on September 29, 2023. The total traded value for the last six months September 2023 of all index constituents is approximately 11.2% of the traded value of all stocks on NSE.

== Methodology ==
The level of the index reflects total free float market value of all the stocks in the index relative to a particular base market capitalization value. This methodology is similar to the one employed to add stocks to NIFTY 50.

Stocks are added to the index based on the following criteria:

1. Represents 50 companies from Nifty 100 after excluding the constituents of Nifty 50.
2. Cumulative weight of index constituents that are not available for trading in F&O segment (Non F&O stocks) is capped at 10% on a quarterly rebalance dates.
3. Weightage of non F&O stocks in the index are individually capped at 4.5% on quarterly rebalance dates.

The index is re-balanced on semi-annual basis. The cut-off date is January 31 and July 31 every year and average data for the previous six months from the cut-off date is considered to filter stocks. A notice of 4 weeks from the date of change is given to market participants so that they can prepare for any changes.

== Comparison with Nifty 50 ==
Nifty Next 50 was launched on December 24, 1996, considering November 03, 1995 as base date and 1000 as base value while Nifty 50 was launched on April 22, 1996, considering November 03, 1995 as base date and 1000 as base value. Nifty Next 50 has outperformed the Nifty 50 considering returns from its start date to April 2024.

== Record values ==
Category	All-time highs	
Closing	74,059.40	Thursday, 11 July 2024
Intra-day	74,453.30	Friday, 12 July 2024

== Constituents ==
The following companies constitute the NIFTY Next 50 index, as of 1 April 2026.

Company Name	Symbol	Sector
ABB India	ABB	Capital Goods
Adani Energy Solutions	ADANIENSOL	Power
Adani Green Energy	ADANIGREEN	Power
Adani Power	ADANIPOWER	Power
Ambuja Cements	AMBUJACEM	Construction Materials
Bajaj Holdings	BAJAJHLDNG	Financial Services
Bank of Baroda	BANKBARODA	Financial Services
Bharat Petroleum	BPCL	Oil, Gas & Consumable Fuels
Britannia Industries	BRITANNIA	Fast Moving Consumer Goods
Bosch	BOSCHLTD	Automobile and Auto Components
Canara Bank	CANBK	Financial Services
CG Power and Industrial Solutions	CGPOWER	Capital Goods
Cholamandalam	CHOLAFIN	Financial Services
Cummins India	CUMMINSIND	Capital Goods
Divi's Laboratories	DIVISLAB	Healthcare
DLF	DLF	Realty
DMart	DMART	Consumer Services
GAIL	GAIL	Oil, Gas & Consumable Fuels
Godrej Consumer Products	GODREJCP	Fast Moving Consumer Goods
HDFC Asset Management	HDFCAMC	Financial Services
Hindustan Aeronautics	HAL	Capital Goods
Hindustan Zinc	HINDZINC	Metals & Mining
Hyundai Motor India	HYUNDAI	Automobile and Auto Components
Indian Hotels Company	INDHOTEL	Consumer Services
Indian Oil Corporation	IOC	Oil, Gas & Consumable Fuels
IRFC	IRFC	Financial Services
Jindal Steel	JINDALSTEL	Metals & Mining
Lodha	LODHA	Realty
LTM	LTM	Information Technology
Mazagon Dock Shipbuilders	MAZDOCK	Capital Goods
Muthoot Finance	MUTHOOTFIN	Financial Services
Pidilite Industries	PIDILITIND	Chemicals
Power Finance Corporation	PFC	Financial Services
Punjab National Bank	PNB	Financial Services
REC	RECLTD	Financial Services
Samvardhana Motherson	MOTHERSON	Automobile and Auto Components
Shree Cement	SHREECEM	Construction Materials
Siemens	SIEMENS	Capital Goods
Siemens Energy	ENRIN	Capital Goods
Solar Industries	SOLARINDS	Chemicals
Tata Capital	TATACAP	Financial Services
Tata Motors	TMCV	Automobile and Auto Components
Tata Power	TATAPOWER	Power
Torrent Pharmaceuticals	TORNTPHARM	Healthcare
TVS Motor Company	TVSMOTOR	Automobile and Auto Components
Union Bank of India	UNIONBANK	Financial Services
United Spirits	UNITDSPR	Fast Moving Consumer Goods
Varun Beverages	VBL	Fast Moving Consumer Goods
Vedanta	VEDL	Metals & Mining
Zydus Lifesciences	ZYDUSLIFE	Healthcare

== See also ==
- NIFTY 50
- BSE SENSEX
- NSE NIFTY 500
