= NSE Indices =

Indian stock market index provider

NSE Indices Limited
- Formerly: India Index Services & Products Limited
- Type: Subsidiary
- Founded: March 1998
- Headquarters: Mumbai, Maharashtra, India
- Products: NIFTY 50; NIFTY Next 50; NIFTY 500
- Parent: NSE
- Website: www.nseindia.com/supra_global/content/iisl/about_iisl.htm

NSE Indices Limited (formerly known as India Index Services & Products Limited (IISL)), a subsidiary of the National Stock Exchange (NSE), provides a variety of indices and index related products and services to Indian capital markets. NSE is an Indian Stock Exchange. It is based in Mumbai, Maharashtra. NSE Indices Ltd. operates as a subsidiary of NSE Strategic Investment Corporation Limited. The company maintains over 100 equity indices comprising broad-based benchmark indices, sectoral indices, fixed income and customized indices.

There are many investment and risk management products, index funds and exchange traded funds benchmarked to indices developed by NSE Indices Ltd. in India and abroad including derivatives traded on NSE, NSE International Exchange (NSE IX), and SGX.

NSE Indices Ltd. was formed with the objective of providing a variety of indices and index related products and services to capital markets. NSE Indices had a marketing and licensing agreement with Standard & Poor's for co-branding equity indices until 2013.

== Broad-market indices ==
Broad indices				Stock group	Cap-based indices				
NIFTY 100	NIFTY 200	NIFTY 500	NIFTY Total Market	1–50	NIFTY LargeMidcap 250		NIFTY 50		
NIFTY 100	NIFTY 200	NIFTY 500	NIFTY Total Market	51–100	NIFTY LargeMidcap 250		NIFTY Next 50		
	NIFTY 200	NIFTY 500	NIFTY Total Market	101–150	NIFTY LargeMidcap 250	NIFTY MidSmallcap 400	NIFTY Midcap 150	NIFTY Midcap 100	NIFTY Midcap 50
	NIFTY 200	NIFTY 500	NIFTY Total Market	151–200	NIFTY LargeMidcap 250	NIFTY MidSmallcap 400	NIFTY Midcap 150	NIFTY Midcap 100	
		NIFTY 500	NIFTY Total Market	201–250	NIFTY LargeMidcap 250	NIFTY MidSmallcap 400	NIFTY Midcap 150		
		NIFTY 500	NIFTY Total Market	251–300		NIFTY MidSmallcap 400	NIFTY Smallcap 250	NIFTY Smallcap 100	NIFTY Smallcap 50
		NIFTY 500	NIFTY Total Market	301–350		NIFTY MidSmallcap 400	NIFTY Smallcap 250	NIFTY Smallcap 100	
		NIFTY 500	NIFTY Total Market	351–500		NIFTY MidSmallcap 400	NIFTY Smallcap 250		
			NIFTY Total Market	501–750			NIFTY Microcap 250		

- Large-caps
- Mid-caps
- Small-caps
- Micro-caps

== Sectoral indices ==
Index	No. of constituents	Type of companies	Further reading
NIFTY Auto	15	Manufacturers of automobile, automotive parts and ancillaries	Automotive industry in India
NIFTY Bank	12	Banks	Banking in India
NIFTY Consumer Durables	15	Manufacturers of home appliances, consumer electronics and fashion accessories	
NIFTY Financial Services	20	Banks, NBFCs and insurance companies	NBFC and MFI in India
NIFTY FMCG	15	Fast-moving consumer goods companies	FMCG in India
NIFTY Healthcare	20	Pharmaceutical companies, hospital chains and diagnostics companies	Healthcare in India
NIFTY IT	10	Software services and technology companies	Information technology in India
NIFTY Media	10	Television, print and digital media companies and entertainment companies	Media of India
NIFTY Metal	15	Manufacturers of metals and metal derivative products	Iron and steel industry in India
NIFTY Oil & Gas	15	Oil and gas companies	Oil and gas industry in India
NIFTY Pharma	20	Pharmaceutical companies	Pharmaceutical industry in India
NIFTY Private Bank	10	Private-sector banks	
NIFTY PSU Bank	12	Public-sector banks	Public sector banks in India
NIFTY Realty	10	Real estate companies	

On May 3, 2025, the NSE launched the Nifty Waves Index to track the performance of India’s media, entertainment, and gaming sectors.
