= Hari Mohan Bangur =

Indian businessman

- Born: 1952 or 1953 (age 72–73)
- Education: IIT Bombay
- Occupation: Businessman
- Title: CEO, Shree Cement
- Children: 2
- Parent: Benu Gopal Bangur

Hari Mohan Bangur (born 1952/53) is an Indian businessman, who is the managing director of Shree Cement.

== Early life ==
He is the son of Benu Gopal Bangur, and great grandson of Mugnee Ram Bangur.

He studied chemical engineering at IIT Bombay.

== Career ==
Bangur has been a director of Shree Cement since 1992, and is its CEO.

In 2002 Shree Cement was in deep trouble, and he nearly agreed a 50/50 merger with the French cement company Vicat. With his father's approval, he declined the merger and turned things around, increasing capacity ten-fold over a decade, and with the share price rising from Rs 45 ten years ago to Rs 4,500.

As of 2016, the Bangur family owns 65% of Shree Cement.

== Personal life ==
He has a son, Prashant, who is the joint managing director.
