= NIFTY 500 =

Indian stock market index

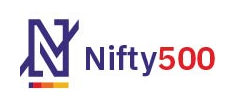
- Operator: NSE Indices
- Exchanges: NSE
- Trading symbol: ^CRSLDX
- Constituents: 500
- Related indices: NIFTY 50; NIFTY Next 50
- Website: www.nseindia.com

The NIFTY 500 is an Indian broad-based stock market index of the companies listed in the National Stock Exchange. It contains top 500 listed companies on the NSE. The NIFTY 500 index represents about 92.04% of free float market capitalization and about 84.07% of the total turnover on the National Stock Exchange (NSE) in India as on 30 March 2026. The index's base date is 01 January 1995, and is rebalanced semi-annually. Financial services are the highest constituent of the index with 31.58% weight, followed by capital goods and healthcare.

NIFTY 500 companies are disaggregated into 72 industry indices. Industry weights in the index reflect industry weights in the market. For example, if the banking sector has a 5% weight in the universe of stocks traded on the NSE, banking stocks in the index would also have an approximate representation of 5% in the index. NIFTY 500 can be used for a variety of purposes such as benchmarking fund portfolios, launching of index funds, ETFs and other structured products.

== Statistics ==
Statistics as reported by NSE as on 30 June 2026
Index returns (%)	1 year	5 year	Since inception
Price return	-2.63	11.28	10.46
Total return	-1.71	12.41	12.13

Fundamentals as reported by NSE on 30 June 2026
P/E	P/B	Dividend yield
22.72	3.48	1.05

== Constituents ==
The constituents of Nifty 500 as of 30 June 2026:

Company Name	Industry	Symbol	Series	ISIN Code
360 ONE WAM Ltd.	Financial Services	360ONE	EQ	INE466L01038
3M India Ltd.	Diversified	3MINDIA	EQ	INE470A01017
ABB India Ltd.	Capital Goods	ABB	EQ	INE117A01022
ACC Ltd.	Construction Materials	ACC	EQ	INE012A01025
ACME Solar Holdings Ltd.	Power	ACMESOLAR	EQ	INE622W01025
AIA Engineering Ltd.	Capital Goods	AIAENG	EQ	INE212H01026
APL Apollo Tubes Ltd.	Capital Goods	APLAPOLLO	EQ	INE702C01027
AU Small Finance Bank Ltd.	Financial Services	AUBANK	EQ	INE949L01017
AWL Agri Business Ltd.	Fast Moving Consumer Goods	AWL	EQ	INE699H01024
Aadhar Housing Finance Ltd.	Financial Services	AADHARHFC	EQ	INE883F01010
Aarti Industries Ltd.	Chemicals	AARTIIND	EQ	INE769A01020
Aavas Financiers Ltd.	Financial Services	AAVAS	EQ	INE216P01012
Abbott India Ltd.	Healthcare	ABBOTINDIA	EQ	INE358A01014
Action Construction Equipment Ltd.	Capital Goods	ACE	EQ	INE731H01025
Acutaas Chemicals Ltd.	Healthcare	ACUTAAS	EQ	INE00FF01025
Adani Energy Solutions Ltd.	Power	ADANIENSOL	EQ	INE931S01010
Adani Enterprises Ltd.	Metals & Mining	ADANIENT	EQ	INE423A01024
Adani Green Energy Ltd.	Power	ADANIGREEN	EQ	INE364U01010
Adani Ports and Special Economic Zone Ltd.	Services	ADANIPORTS	EQ	INE742F01042
Adani Power Ltd.	Power	ADANIPOWER	EQ	INE814H01029
Adani Total Gas Ltd.	Oil Gas & Consumable Fuels	ATGL	EQ	INE399L01023
Aditya Birla Capital Ltd.	Financial Services	ABCAPITAL	EQ	INE674K01013
Aditya Birla Fashion and Retail Ltd.	Consumer Services	ABFRL	EQ	INE647O01011
Aditya Birla Lifestyle Brands Ltd.	Consumer Services	ABLBL	EQ	INE14LE01019
Aditya Birla Real Estate Ltd.	Realty	ABREL	EQ	INE055A01016
Aditya Birla Sun Life AMC Ltd.	Financial Services	ABSLAMC	EQ	INE404A01024
Aditya Infotech Ltd.	Capital Goods	CPPLUS	EQ	INE819V01029
Aegis Logistics Ltd.	Oil Gas & Consumable Fuels	AEGISLOG	EQ	INE208C01025
Aegis Vopak Terminals Ltd.	Oil Gas & Consumable Fuels	AEGISVOPAK	EQ	INE0INX01018
Afcons Infrastructure Ltd.	Construction	AFCONS	EQ	INE101I01011
Affle 3i Ltd.	Information Technology	AFFLE	EQ	INE00WC01027
Ajanta Pharmaceuticals Ltd.	Healthcare	AJANTPHARM	EQ	INE031B01049
Alkem Laboratories Ltd.	Healthcare	ALKEM	EQ	INE540L01014
Allied Blenders and Distillers Ltd.	Fast Moving Consumer Goods	ABDL	EQ	INE552Z01027
Amara Raja Energy & Mobility Ltd.	Automobile and Auto Components	ARE&M	EQ	INE885A01032
Amber Enterprises India Ltd.	Consumer Durables	AMBER	EQ	INE371P01015
Ambuja Cements Ltd.	Construction Materials	AMBUJACEM	EQ	INE079A01024
Anand Rathi Wealth Ltd.	Financial Services	ANANDRATHI	EQ	INE463V01026
Anant Raj Ltd.	Realty	ANANTRAJ	EQ	INE242C01024
Angel One Ltd.	Financial Services	ANGELONE	EQ	INE732I01021
Anthem Biosciences Ltd.	Healthcare	ANTHEM	EQ	INE0CZ201020
Anupam Rasayan India Ltd.	Chemicals	ANURAS	EQ	INE930P01018
Apar Industries Ltd.	Capital Goods	APARINDS	EQ	INE372A01015
Apollo Hospitals Enterprise Ltd.	Healthcare	APOLLOHOSP	EQ	INE437A01024
Apollo Tyres Ltd.	Automobile and Auto Components	APOLLOTYRE	EQ	INE438A01022
Aptus Value Housing Finance India Ltd.	Financial Services	APTUS	EQ	INE852O01025
Asahi India Glass Ltd.	Automobile and Auto Components	ASAHIINDIA	EQ	INE439A01020
Ashok Leyland Ltd.	Capital Goods	ASHOKLEY	EQ	INE208A01029
Asian Paints Ltd.	Consumer Durables	ASIANPAINT	EQ	INE021A01026
Aster DM Healthcare Ltd.	Healthcare	ASTERDM	EQ	INE914M01019
Astral Ltd.	Capital Goods	ASTRAL	EQ	INE006I01046
Ather Energy Ltd.	Automobile and Auto Components	ATHERENERG	EQ	INE0LEZ01016
Atul Ltd.	Chemicals	ATUL	EQ	INE100A01010
Aurobindo Pharma Ltd.	Healthcare	AUROPHARMA	EQ	INE406A01037
Authum Investment & Infrastructure Ltd.	Financial Services	AIIL	EQ	INE206F01022
Avenue Supermarts Ltd.	Consumer Services	DMART	EQ	INE192R01011
Axis Bank Ltd.	Financial Services	AXISBANK	EQ	INE238A01034
BEML Ltd.	Capital Goods	BEML	EQ	INE258A01024
BLS International Services Ltd.	Consumer Services	BLS	EQ	INE153T01027
BSE Ltd.	Financial Services	BSE	EQ	INE118H01025
Bajaj Auto Ltd.	Automobile and Auto Components	BAJAJ-AUTO	EQ	INE917I01010
Bajaj Finance Ltd.	Financial Services	BAJFINANCE	EQ	INE296A01032
Bajaj Finserv Ltd.	Financial Services	BAJAJFINSV	EQ	INE918I01026
Bajaj Holdings & Investment Ltd.	Financial Services	BAJAJHLDNG	EQ	INE118A01012
Bajaj Housing Finance Ltd.	Financial Services	BAJAJHFL	EQ	INE377Y01014
Balkrishna Industries Ltd.	Automobile and Auto Components	BALKRISIND	EQ	INE787D01026
Balrampur Chini Mills Ltd.	Fast Moving Consumer Goods	BALRAMCHIN	EQ	INE119A01028
Bandhan Bank Ltd.	Financial Services	BANDHANBNK	EQ	INE545U01014
Bank of Baroda	Financial Services	BANKBARODA	EQ	INE028A01039
Bank of India	Financial Services	BANKINDIA	EQ	INE084A01016
Bank of Maharashtra	Financial Services	MAHABANK	EQ	INE457A01014
Bata India Ltd.	Consumer Durables	BATAINDIA	EQ	INE176A01028
Bayer Cropscience Ltd.	Chemicals	BAYERCROP	EQ	INE462A01022
Belrise Industries Ltd.	Automobile and Auto Components	BELRISE	EQ	INE894V01022
Berger Paints India Ltd.	Consumer Durables	BERGEPAINT	EQ	INE463A01038
Bharat Dynamics Ltd.	Capital Goods	BDL	EQ	INE171Z01026
Bharat Electronics Ltd.	Capital Goods	BEL	EQ	INE263A01024
Bharat Forge Ltd.	Automobile and Auto Components	BHARATFORG	EQ	INE465A01025
Bharat Heavy Electricals Ltd.	Capital Goods	BHEL	EQ	INE257A01026
Bharat Petroleum Corporation Ltd.	Oil Gas & Consumable Fuels	BPCL	EQ	INE029A01011
Bharti Airtel Ltd.	Telecommunication	BHARTIARTL	EQ	INE397D01024
Bharti Hexacom Ltd.	Telecommunication	BHARTIHEXA	EQ	INE343G01021
Bikaji Foods International Ltd.	Fast Moving Consumer Goods	BIKAJI	EQ	INE00E101023
Billionbrains Garage Ventures Ltd.	Financial Services	GROWW	EQ	INE0HOQ01053
Biocon Ltd.	Healthcare	BIOCON	EQ	INE376G01013
Birlasoft Ltd.	Information Technology	BSOFT	EQ	INE836A01035
Blue Dart Express Ltd.	Services	BLUEDART	EQ	INE233B01017
Blue Jet Healthcare Ltd.	Healthcare	BLUEJET	EQ	INE0KBH01020
Blue Star Ltd.	Consumer Durables	BLUESTARCO	EQ	INE472A01039
Bombay Burmah Trading Corporation Ltd.	Fast Moving Consumer Goods	BBTC	EQ	INE050A01025
Bosch Ltd.	Automobile and Auto Components	BOSCHLTD	EQ	INE323A01026
Brainbees Solutions Ltd.	Consumer Services	FIRSTCRY	EQ	INE02RE01045
Brigade Enterprises Ltd.	Realty	BRIGADE	EQ	INE791I01019
Britannia Industries Ltd.	Fast Moving Consumer Goods	BRITANNIA	EQ	INE216A01030
C.E. Info Systems Ltd.	Information Technology	MAPMYINDIA	EQ	INE0BV301023
CCL Products (I) Ltd.	Fast Moving Consumer Goods	CCL	EQ	INE421D01022
CESC Ltd.	Power	CESC	EQ	INE486A01021
CG Power and Industrial Solutions Ltd.	Capital Goods	CGPOWER	EQ	INE067A01029
CIE Automotive India Ltd.	Automobile and Auto Components	CIEINDIA	EQ	INE536H01010
CRISIL Ltd.	Financial Services	CRISIL	EQ	INE007A01025
Can Fin Homes Ltd.	Financial Services	CANFINHOME	EQ	INE477A01020
Canara Bank	Financial Services	CANBK	EQ	INE476A01022
Canara HSBC Life Insurance Company Ltd.	Financial Services	CANHLIFE	EQ	INE01TY01017
Caplin Point Laboratories Ltd.	Healthcare	CAPLIPOINT	EQ	INE475E01026
Capri Global Capital Ltd.	Financial Services	CGCL	EQ	INE180C01042
Carborundum Universal Ltd.	Capital Goods	CARBORUNIV	EQ	INE120A01034
Cartrade Tech Ltd.	Consumer Services	CARTRADE	EQ	INE290S01011
Castrol India Ltd.	Oil Gas & Consumable Fuels	CASTROLIND	EQ	INE172A01027
Ceat Ltd.	Automobile and Auto Components	CEATLTD	EQ	INE482A01020
Cemindia Projects Ltd.	Construction	CEMPRO	EQ	INE686A01026
Central Bank of India	Financial Services	CENTRALBK	EQ	INE483A01010
Central Depository Services (India) Ltd.	Financial Services	CDSL	EQ	INE736A01011
Chalet Hotels Ltd.	Consumer Services	CHALET	EQ	INE427F01016
Chambal Fertilizers & Chemicals Ltd.	Chemicals	CHAMBLFERT	EQ	INE085A01013
Chennai Petroleum Corporation Ltd.	Oil Gas & Consumable Fuels	CHENNPETRO	EQ	INE178A01016
Choice International Ltd.	Financial Services	CHOICEIN	EQ	INE102B01014
Cholamandalam Financial Holdings Ltd.	Financial Services	CHOLAHLDNG	EQ	INE149A01033
Cholamandalam Investment and Finance Company Ltd.	Financial Services	CHOLAFIN	EQ	INE121A01024
Cipla Ltd.	Healthcare	CIPLA	EQ	INE059A01026
City Union Bank Ltd.	Financial Services	CUB	EQ	INE491A01021
Clean Science and Technology Ltd.	Chemicals	CLEAN	EQ	INE227W01023
Coal India Ltd.	Oil Gas & Consumable Fuels	COALINDIA	EQ	INE522F01014
Cochin Shipyard Ltd.	Capital Goods	COCHINSHIP	EQ	INE704P01025
Coforge Ltd.	Information Technology	COFORGE	EQ	INE591G01025
Cohance Lifesciences Ltd.	Healthcare	COHANCE	EQ	INE03QK01018
Colgate Palmolive (India) Ltd.	Fast Moving Consumer Goods	COLPAL	EQ	INE259A01022
Computer Age Management Services Ltd.	Financial Services	CAMS	EQ	INE596I01020
Concord Biotech Ltd.	Healthcare	CONCORDBIO	EQ	INE338H01029
Container Corporation of India Ltd.	Services	CONCOR	EQ	INE111A01025
Coromandel International Ltd.	Chemicals	COROMANDEL	EQ	INE169A01031
Craftsman Automation Ltd.	Automobile and Auto Components	CRAFTSMAN	EQ	INE00LO01017
CreditAccess Grameen Ltd.	Financial Services	CREDITACC	EQ	INE741K01010
Crompton Greaves Consumer Electricals Ltd.	Consumer Durables	CROMPTON	EQ	INE299U01018
Cummins India Ltd.	Capital Goods	CUMMINSIND	EQ	INE298A01020
Cyient Ltd.	Information Technology	CYIENT	EQ	INE136B01020
DCM Shriram Ltd.	Diversified	DCMSHRIRAM	EQ	INE499A01024
DLF Ltd.	Realty	DLF	EQ	INE271C01023
DOMS Industries Ltd.	Fast Moving Consumer Goods	DOMS	EQ	INE321T01012
Dabur India Ltd.	Fast Moving Consumer Goods	DABUR	EQ	INE016A01026
Dalmia Bharat Ltd.	Construction Materials	DALBHARAT	EQ	INE00R701025
Data Patterns (India) Ltd.	Capital Goods	DATAPATTNS	EQ	INE0IX101010
Deepak Fertilisers & Petrochemicals Corp. Ltd.	Chemicals	DEEPAKFERT	EQ	INE501A01019
Deepak Nitrite Ltd.	Chemicals	DEEPAKNTR	EQ	INE288B01029
Delhivery Ltd.	Services	DELHIVERY	EQ	INE148O01028
Devyani International Ltd.	Consumer Services	DEVYANI	EQ	INE872J01023
Divi's Laboratories Ltd.	Healthcare	DIVISLAB	EQ	INE361B01024
Dixon Technologies (India) Ltd.	Consumer Durables	DIXON	EQ	INE935N01020
Dr. Lal Path Labs Ltd.	Healthcare	LALPATHLAB	EQ	INE600L01024
Dr. Reddy's Laboratories Ltd.	Healthcare	DRREDDY	EQ	INE089A01031
E.I.D. Parry (India) Ltd.	Fast Moving Consumer Goods	EIDPARRY	EQ	INE126A01031
EIH Ltd.	Consumer Services	EIHOTEL	EQ	INE230A01023
Eicher Motors Ltd.	Automobile and Auto Components	EICHERMOT	EQ	INE066A01021
Elecon Engineering Co. Ltd.	Capital Goods	ELECON	EQ	INE205B01031
Elgi Equipments Ltd.	Capital Goods	ELGIEQUIP	EQ	INE285A01027
Emami Ltd.	Fast Moving Consumer Goods	EMAMILTD	EQ	INE548C01032
Emcure Pharmaceuticals Ltd.	Healthcare	EMCURE	EQ	INE168P01015
Emmvee Photovoltaic Power Ltd.	Capital Goods	EMMVEE	EQ	INE1C6T01020
Endurance Technologies Ltd.	Automobile and Auto Components	ENDURANCE	EQ	INE913H01037
Engineers India Ltd.	Construction	ENGINERSIN	EQ	INE510A01028
Eris Lifesciences Ltd.	Healthcare	ERIS	EQ	INE406M01024
Escorts Kubota Ltd.	Capital Goods	ESCORTS	EQ	INE042A01014
Eternal Ltd.	Consumer Services	ETERNAL	EQ	INE758T01015
Exide Industries Ltd.	Automobile and Auto Components	EXIDEIND	EQ	INE302A01020
FSN E-Commerce Ventures Ltd.	Consumer Services	NYKAA	EQ	INE388Y01029
Federal Bank Ltd.	Financial Services	FEDERALBNK	EQ	INE171A01029
Fertilisers and Chemicals Travancore Ltd.	Chemicals	FACT	EQ	INE188A01015
Finolex Cables Ltd.	Capital Goods	FINCABLES	EQ	INE235A01022
Firstsource Solutions Ltd.	Services	FSL	EQ	INE684F01012
Five-Star Business Finance Ltd.	Financial Services	FIVESTAR	EQ	INE128S01021
Force Motors Ltd.	Automobile and Auto Components	FORCEMOT	EQ	INE451A01017
Fortis Healthcare Ltd.	Healthcare	FORTIS	EQ	INE061F01013
GAIL (India) Ltd.	Oil Gas & Consumable Fuels	GAIL	EQ	INE129A01019
GE Vernova T&D India Ltd.	Capital Goods	GVT&D	EQ	INE200A01026
GMR Airports Ltd.	Services	GMRAIRPORT	EQ	INE776C01039
Gabriel India Ltd.	Automobile and Auto Components	GABRIEL	EQ	INE524A01029
Gallantt Ispat Ltd.	Capital Goods	GALLANTT	EQ	INE297H01019
Garden Reach Shipbuilders & Engineers Ltd.	Capital Goods	GRSE	EQ	INE382Z01011
General Insurance Corporation of India	Financial Services	GICRE	EQ	INE481Y01014
Gillette India Ltd.	Fast Moving Consumer Goods	GILLETTE	EQ	INE322A01010
Gland Pharma Ltd.	Healthcare	GLAND	EQ	INE068V01023
Glaxosmithkline Pharmaceuticals Ltd.	Healthcare	GLAXO	EQ	INE159A01016
Glenmark Pharmaceuticals Ltd.	Healthcare	GLENMARK	EQ	INE935A01035
Global Health Ltd.	Healthcare	MEDANTA	EQ	INE474Q01031
Go Digit General Insurance Ltd.	Financial Services	GODIGIT	EQ	INE03JT01014
Godawari Power & Ispat Ltd.	Capital Goods	GPIL	EQ	INE177H01039
Godfrey Phillips India Ltd.	Fast Moving Consumer Goods	GODFRYPHLP	EQ	INE260B01028
Godrej Consumer Products Ltd.	Fast Moving Consumer Goods	GODREJCP	EQ	INE102D01028
Godrej Industries Ltd.	Diversified	GODREJIND	EQ	INE233A01035
Godrej Properties Ltd.	Realty	GODREJPROP	EQ	INE484J01027
Granules India Ltd.	Healthcare	GRANULES	EQ	INE101D01020
Graphite India Ltd.	Capital Goods	GRAPHITE	EQ	INE371A01025
Grasim Industries Ltd.	Construction Materials	GRASIM	EQ	INE047A01021
Gravita India Ltd.	Metals & Mining	GRAVITA	EQ	INE024L01027
Great Eastern Shipping Co. Ltd.	Services	GESHIP	EQ	INE017A01032
Gujarat Fluorochemicals Ltd.	Chemicals	FLUOROCHEM	EQ	INE09N301011
Gujarat Mineral Development Corporation Ltd.	Metals & Mining	GMDCLTD	EQ	INE131A01031
H.E.G. Ltd.	Capital Goods	HEG	EQ	INE545A01024
HBL Engineering Ltd.	Capital Goods	HBLENGINE	EQ	INE292B01021
HCL Technologies Ltd.	Information Technology	HCLTECH	EQ	INE860A01027
HDB Financial Services Ltd.	Financial Services	HDBFS	EQ	INE756I01012
HDFC Asset Management Company Ltd.	Financial Services	HDFCAMC	EQ	INE127D01025
HDFC Bank Ltd.	Financial Services	HDFCBANK	EQ	INE040A01034
HDFC Life Insurance Company Ltd.	Financial Services	HDFCLIFE	EQ	INE795G01014
HFCL Ltd.	Telecommunication	HFCL	EQ	INE548A01028
Havells India Ltd.	Consumer Durables	HAVELLS	EQ	INE176B01034
Hero MotoCorp Ltd.	Automobile and Auto Components	HEROMOTOCO	EQ	INE158A01026
Hexaware Technologies Ltd.	Information Technology	HEXT	EQ	INE093A01041
Himadri Speciality Chemical Ltd.	Chemicals	HSCL	EQ	INE019C01026
Hindalco Industries Ltd.	Metals & Mining	HINDALCO	EQ	INE038A01020
Hindustan Aeronautics Ltd.	Capital Goods	HAL	EQ	INE066F01020
Hindustan Copper Ltd.	Metals & Mining	HINDCOPPER	EQ	INE531E01026
Hindustan Petroleum Corporation Ltd.	Oil Gas & Consumable Fuels	HINDPETRO	EQ	INE094A01015
Hindustan Unilever Ltd.	Fast Moving Consumer Goods	HINDUNILVR	EQ	INE030A01027
Hindustan Zinc Ltd.	Metals & Mining	HINDZINC	EQ	INE267A01025
Hitachi Energy India Ltd.	Capital Goods	POWERINDIA	EQ	INE07Y701011
Home First Finance Company India Ltd.	Financial Services	HOMEFIRST	EQ	INE481N01025
Honasa Consumer Ltd.	Fast Moving Consumer Goods	HONASA	EQ	INE0J5401028
Honeywell Automation India Ltd.	Capital Goods	HONAUT	EQ	INE671A01010
Housing & Urban Development Corporation Ltd.	Financial Services	HUDCO	EQ	INE031A01017
Hyundai Motor India Ltd.	Automobile and Auto Components	HYUNDAI	EQ	INE0V6F01027
ICICI Bank Ltd.	Financial Services	ICICIBANK	EQ	INE090A01021
ICICI Lombard General Insurance Company Ltd.	Financial Services	ICICIGI	EQ	INE765G01017
ICICI Prudential Asset Management Company Ltd.	Financial Services	ICICIAMC	EQ	INE346A01027
ICICI Prudential Life Insurance Company Ltd.	Financial Services	ICICIPRULI	EQ	INE726G01019
IDBI Bank Ltd.	Financial Services	IDBI	EQ	INE008A01015
IDFC First Bank Ltd.	Financial Services	IDFCFIRSTB	EQ	INE092T01019
IFCI Ltd.	Financial Services	IFCI	EQ	INE039A01010
IIFL Finance Ltd.	Financial Services	IIFL	EQ	INE530B01024
IRB Infrastructure Developers Ltd.	Construction	IRB	EQ	INE821I01022
IRCON International Ltd.	Construction	IRCON	EQ	INE962Y01021
ITC Hotels Ltd.	Consumer Services	ITCHOTELS	EQ	INE379A01028
ITC Ltd.	Fast Moving Consumer Goods	ITC	EQ	INE154A01025
ITI Ltd.	Telecommunication	ITI	EQ	INE248A01017
Indegene Ltd.	Healthcare	INDGN	EQ	INE065X01017
India Cements Ltd.	Construction Materials	INDIACEM	EQ	INE383A01012
Indiamart Intermesh Ltd.	Consumer Services	INDIAMART	EQ	INE933S01016
Indian Bank	Financial Services	INDIANB	EQ	INE562A01011
Indian Energy Exchange Ltd.	Financial Services	IEX	EQ	INE022Q01020
Indian Hotels Co. Ltd.	Consumer Services	INDHOTEL	EQ	INE053A01029
Indian Oil Corporation Ltd.	Oil Gas & Consumable Fuels	IOC	EQ	INE242A01010
Indian Overseas Bank	Financial Services	IOB	EQ	INE565A01014
Indian Railway Catering And Tourism Corporation Ltd.	Consumer Services	IRCTC	EQ	INE335Y01020
Indian Railway Finance Corporation Ltd.	Financial Services	IRFC	EQ	INE053F01010
Indian Renewable Energy Development Agency Ltd.	Financial Services	IREDA	EQ	INE202E01016
Indraprastha Gas Ltd.	Oil Gas & Consumable Fuels	IGL	EQ	INE203G01027
Indus Towers Ltd.	Telecommunication	INDUSTOWER	EQ	INE121J01017
IndusInd Bank Ltd.	Financial Services	INDUSINDBK	EQ	INE095A01012
Info Edge (India) Ltd.	Consumer Services	NAUKRI	EQ	INE663F01032
Infosys Ltd.	Information Technology	INFY	EQ	INE009A01021
Inox Wind Ltd.	Capital Goods	INOXWIND	EQ	INE066P01011
Intellect Design Arena Ltd.	Information Technology	INTELLECT	EQ	INE306R01017
InterGlobe Aviation Ltd.	Services	INDIGO	EQ	INE646L01027
International Gemological Institute Ltd.	Services	IGIL	EQ	INE0Q9301021
Inventurus Knowledge Solutions Ltd.	Information Technology	IKS	EQ	INE115Q01022
Ipca Laboratories Ltd.	Healthcare	IPCALAB	EQ	INE571A01038
J.B. Chemicals & Pharmaceuticals Ltd.	Healthcare	JBCHEPHARM	EQ	INE572A01036
J.K. Cement Ltd.	Construction Materials	JKCEMENT	EQ	INE823G01014
JBM Auto Ltd.	Automobile and Auto Components	JBMA	EQ	INE927D01051
JK Tyre & Industries Ltd.	Automobile and Auto Components	JKTYRE	EQ	INE573A01042
JM Financial Ltd.	Financial Services	JMFINANCIL	EQ	INE780C01023
JSW Cement Ltd.	Construction Materials	JSWCEMENT	EQ	INE718I01012
JSW Dulux Ltd.	Consumer Durables	JSWDULUX	EQ	INE133A01011
JSW Energy Ltd.	Power	JSWENERGY	EQ	INE121E01018
JSW Infrastructure Ltd.	Services	JSWINFRA	EQ	INE880J01026
JSW Steel Ltd.	Metals & Mining	JSWSTEEL	EQ	INE019A01038
Jain Resource Recycling Ltd.	Metals & Mining	JAINREC	EQ	INE0YD401026
Jaiprakash Power Ventures Ltd.	Power	JPPOWER	EQ	INE351F01018
Jammu & Kashmir Bank Ltd.	Financial Services	J&KBANK	EQ	INE168A01041
Jindal Saw Ltd.	Capital Goods	JINDALSAW	EQ	INE324A01032
Jindal Stainless Ltd.	Metals & Mining	JSL	EQ	INE220G01021
Jindal Steel Ltd.	Metals & Mining	JINDALSTEL	EQ	INE749A01030
Jio Financial Services Ltd.	Financial Services	JIOFIN	EQ	INE758E01017
Jubilant Foodworks Ltd.	Consumer Services	JUBLFOOD	EQ	INE797F01020
Jubilant Ingrevia Ltd.	Chemicals	JUBLINGREA	EQ	INE0BY001018
Jubilant Pharmova Ltd.	Healthcare	JUBLPHARMA	EQ	INE700A01033
Jupiter Wagons Ltd.	Capital Goods	JWL	EQ	INE209L01016
Jyoti CNC Automation Ltd.	Capital Goods	JYOTICNC	EQ	INE980O01024
K.P.R. Mill Ltd.	Textiles	KPRMILL	EQ	INE930H01031
KEI Industries Ltd.	Capital Goods	KEI	EQ	INE878B01027
KPIT Technologies Ltd.	Information Technology	KPITTECH	EQ	INE04I401011
Kajaria Ceramics Ltd.	Consumer Durables	KAJARIACER	EQ	INE217B01036
Kalpataru Projects International Ltd.	Construction	KPIL	EQ	INE220B01022
Kalyan Jewellers India Ltd.	Consumer Durables	KALYANKJIL	EQ	INE303R01014
Karur Vysya Bank Ltd.	Financial Services	KARURVYSYA	EQ	INE036D01028
Kaynes Technology India Ltd.	Capital Goods	KAYNES	EQ	INE918Z01012
Kec International Ltd.	Construction	KEC	EQ	INE389H01022
Kfin Technologies Ltd.	Financial Services	KFINTECH	EQ	INE138Y01010
Kirloskar Oil Eng Ltd.	Capital Goods	KIRLOSENG	EQ	INE146L01010
Kotak Mahindra Bank Ltd.	Financial Services	KOTAKBANK	EQ	INE237A01036
Krishna Institute of Medical Sciences Ltd.	Healthcare	KIMS	EQ	INE967H01025
L&T Finance Ltd.	Financial Services	LTF	EQ	INE498L01015
L&T Technology Services Ltd.	Information Technology	LTTS	EQ	INE010V01017
LG Electronics India Ltd.	Consumer Durables	LGEINDIA	EQ	INE324D01010
LIC Housing Finance Ltd.	Financial Services	LICHSGFIN	EQ	INE115A01026
LT Foods Ltd.	Fast Moving Consumer Goods	LTFOODS	EQ	INE818H01020
LTM Ltd.	Information Technology	LTM	EQ	INE214T01019
Larsen & Toubro Ltd.	Construction	LT	EQ	INE018A01030
Latent View Analytics Ltd.	Information Technology	LATENTVIEW	EQ	INE0I7C01011
Laurus Labs Ltd.	Healthcare	LAURUSLABS	EQ	INE947Q01028
Leela Palaces Hotels & Resorts Ltd.	Consumer Services	THELEELA	EQ	INE0AQ201015
Lemon Tree Hotels Ltd.	Consumer Services	LEMONTREE	EQ	INE970X01018
Lenskart Solutions Ltd.	Consumer Services	LENSKART	EQ	INE956O01016
Life Insurance Corporation of India	Financial Services	LICI	EQ	INE0J1Y01017
Linde India Ltd.	Chemicals	LINDEINDIA	EQ	INE473A01011
Lloyds Metals And Energy Ltd.	Metals & Mining	LLOYDSME	EQ	INE281B01032
Lodha Developers Ltd.	Realty	LODHA	EQ	INE670K01029
Lupin Ltd.	Healthcare	LUPIN	EQ	INE326A01037
MMTC Ltd.	Services	MMTC	EQ	INE123F01029
MRF Ltd.	Automobile and Auto Components	MRF	EQ	INE883A01011
Mahanagar Gas Ltd.	Oil Gas & Consumable Fuels	MGL	EQ	INE002S01010
Mahindra & Mahindra Financial Services Ltd.	Financial Services	M&MFIN	EQ	INE774D01024
Mahindra & Mahindra Ltd.	Automobile and Auto Components	M&M	EQ	INE101A01026
Manappuram Finance Ltd.	Financial Services	MANAPPURAM	EQ	INE522D01027
Mangalore Refinery & Petrochemicals Ltd.	Oil Gas & Consumable Fuels	MRPL	EQ	INE103A01014
Mankind Pharma Ltd.	Healthcare	MANKIND	EQ	INE634S01028
Marico Ltd.	Fast Moving Consumer Goods	MARICO	EQ	INE196A01026
Maruti Suzuki India Ltd.	Automobile and Auto Components	MARUTI	EQ	INE585B01010
Max Financial Services Ltd.	Financial Services	MFSL	EQ	INE180A01020
Max Healthcare Institute Ltd.	Healthcare	MAXHEALTH	EQ	INE027H01010
Mazagoan Dock Shipbuilders Ltd.	Capital Goods	MAZDOCK	EQ	INE249Z01020
Meesho Ltd.	Consumer Services	MEESHO	EQ	INE0VDM01015
Minda Corporation Ltd.	Automobile and Auto Components	MINDACORP	EQ	INE842C01021
Motherson Sumi Wiring India Ltd.	Automobile and Auto Components	MSUMI	EQ	INE0FS801015
Motilal Oswal Financial Services Ltd.	Financial Services	MOTILALOFS	EQ	INE338I01027
MphasiS Ltd.	Information Technology	MPHASIS	EQ	INE356A01018
Multi Commodity Exchange of India Ltd.	Financial Services	MCX	EQ	INE745G01043
Muthoot Finance Ltd.	Financial Services	MUTHOOTFIN	EQ	INE414G01012
NATCO Pharma Ltd.	Healthcare	NATCOPHARM	EQ	INE987B01026
NBCC (India) Ltd.	Construction	NBCC	EQ	INE095N01031
NCC Ltd.	Construction	NCC	EQ	INE868B01028
NHPC Ltd.	Power	NHPC	EQ	INE848E01016
NLC India Ltd.	Power	NLCINDIA	EQ	INE589A01014
NMDC Ltd.	Metals & Mining	NMDC	EQ	INE584A01023
NMDC Steel Ltd.	Metals & Mining	NSLNISP	EQ	INE0NNS01018
NTPC Green Energy Ltd.	Power	NTPCGREEN	EQ	INE0ONG01011
NTPC Ltd.	Power	NTPC	EQ	INE733E01010
Narayana Hrudayalaya Ltd.	Healthcare	NH	EQ	INE410P01011
National Aluminium Co. Ltd.	Metals & Mining	NATIONALUM	EQ	INE139A01034
Nava Ltd.	Power	NAVA	EQ	INE725A01030
Navin Fluorine International Ltd.	Chemicals	NAVINFLUOR	EQ	INE048G01026
Nestle India Ltd.	Fast Moving Consumer Goods	NESTLEIND	EQ	INE239A01024
Netweb Technologies India Ltd.	Information Technology	NETWEB	EQ	INE0NT901020
Neuland Laboratories Ltd.	Healthcare	NEULANDLAB	EQ	INE794A01010
Newgen Software Technologies Ltd.	Information Technology	NEWGEN	EQ	INE619B01017
Nippon Life India Asset Management Ltd.	Financial Services	NAM-INDIA	EQ	INE298J01013
Niva Bupa Health Insurance Company Ltd.	Financial Services	NIVABUPA	EQ	INE995S01015
Nuvama Wealth Management Ltd.	Financial Services	NUVAMA	EQ	INE531F01023
Nuvoco Vistas Corporation Ltd.	Construction Materials	NUVOCO	EQ	INE118D01016
Oberoi Realty Ltd.	Realty	OBEROIRLTY	EQ	INE093I01010
Oil & Natural Gas Corporation Ltd.	Oil Gas & Consumable Fuels	ONGC	EQ	INE213A01029
Oil India Ltd.	Oil Gas & Consumable Fuels	OIL	EQ	INE274J01014
Ola Electric Mobility Ltd.	Automobile and Auto Components	OLAELEC	EQ	INE0LXG01040
Olectra Greentech Ltd.	Automobile and Auto Components	OLECTRA	EQ	INE260D01016
One 97 Communications Ltd.	Financial Services	PAYTM	EQ	INE982J01020
Onesource Specialty Pharma Ltd.	Healthcare	ONESOURCE	EQ	INE013P01021
Oracle Financial Services Software Ltd.	Information Technology	OFSS	EQ	INE881D01027
PB Fintech Ltd.	Financial Services	POLICYBZR	EQ	INE417T01026
PCBL Chemical Ltd.	Chemicals	PCBL	EQ	INE602A01031
PG Electroplast Ltd.	Consumer Durables	PGEL	EQ	INE457L01029
PI Industries Ltd.	Chemicals	PIIND	EQ	INE603J01030
PNB Housing Finance Ltd.	Financial Services	PNBHOUSING	EQ	INE572E01012
PTC Industries Ltd.	Capital Goods	PTCIL	EQ	INE596F01018
PVR INOX Ltd.	Media Entertainment & Publication	PVRINOX	EQ	INE191H01014
Page Industries Ltd.	Textiles	PAGEIND	EQ	INE761H01022
Paradeep Phosphates Ltd.	Chemicals	PARADEEP	EQ	INE088F01024
Patanjali Foods Ltd.	Fast Moving Consumer Goods	PATANJALI	EQ	INE619A01035
Persistent Systems Ltd.	Information Technology	PERSISTENT	EQ	INE262H01021
Petronet LNG Ltd.	Oil Gas & Consumable Fuels	PETRONET	EQ	INE347G01014
Pfizer Ltd.	Healthcare	PFIZER	EQ	INE182A01018
Phoenix Mills Ltd.	Realty	PHOENIXLTD	EQ	INE211B01039
Physicswallah Ltd.	Consumer Services	PWL	EQ	INE0LP301011
Pidilite Industries Ltd.	Chemicals	PIDILITIND	EQ	INE318A01026
Pine Labs Ltd.	Financial Services	PINELABS	EQ	INE15B701018
Piramal Finance Ltd.	Financial Services	PIRAMALFIN	EQ	INE202B01038
Piramal Pharma Ltd.	Healthcare	PPLPHARMA	EQ	INE0DK501011
Poly Medicure Ltd.	Healthcare	POLYMED	EQ	INE205C01021
Polycab India Ltd.	Capital Goods	POLYCAB	EQ	INE455K01017
Poonawalla Fincorp Ltd.	Financial Services	POONAWALLA	EQ	INE511C01022
Power Finance Corporation Ltd.	Financial Services	PFC	EQ	INE134E01011
Power Grid Corporation of India Ltd.	Power	POWERGRID	EQ	INE752E01010
Premier Energies Ltd.	Capital Goods	PREMIERENE	EQ	INE0BS701011
Prestige Estates Projects Ltd.	Realty	PRESTIGE	EQ	INE811K01011
Punjab National Bank	Financial Services	PNB	EQ	INE160A01022
R R Kabel Ltd.	Capital Goods	RRKABEL	EQ	INE777K01022
RBL Bank Ltd.	Financial Services	RBLBANK	EQ	INE976G01028
REC Ltd.	Financial Services	RECLTD	EQ	INE020B01018
RHI MAGNESITA INDIA LTD.	Capital Goods	RHIM	EQ	INE743M01012
RITES Ltd.	Construction	RITES	EQ	INE320J01015
Radico Khaitan Ltd	Fast Moving Consumer Goods	RADICO	EQ	INE944F01028
Rail Vikas Nigam Ltd.	Construction	RVNL	EQ	INE415G01027
Railtel Corporation Of India Ltd.	Telecommunication	RAILTEL	EQ	INE0DD101019
Rainbow Childrens Medicare Ltd.	Healthcare	RAINBOW	EQ	INE961O01016
Ramkrishna Forgings Ltd.	Automobile and Auto Components	RKFORGE	EQ	INE399G01023
Redington Ltd.	Services	REDINGTON	EQ	INE891D01026
Reliance Industries Ltd.	Oil Gas & Consumable Fuels	RELIANCE	EQ	INE002A01018
Reliance Power Ltd.	Power	RPOWER	EQ	INE614G01033
SBFC Finance Ltd.	Financial Services	SBFC	EQ	INE423Y01016
SBI Cards and Payment Services Ltd.	Financial Services	SBICARD	EQ	INE018E01016
SBI Life Insurance Company Ltd.	Financial Services	SBILIFE	EQ	INE123W01016
SJVN Ltd.	Power	SJVN	EQ	INE002L01015
SRF Ltd.	Chemicals	SRF	EQ	INE647A01010
Sagility Ltd.	Information Technology	SAGILITY	EQ	INE0W2G01015
Sai Life Sciences Ltd.	Healthcare	SAILIFE	EQ	INE570L01029
Sammaan Capital Ltd.	Financial Services	SAMMAANCAP	EQ	INE148I01020
Samvardhana Motherson International Ltd.	Automobile and Auto Components	MOTHERSON	EQ	INE775A01035
Sapphire Foods India Ltd.	Consumer Services	SAPPHIRE	EQ	INE806T01020
Sarda Energy and Minerals Ltd.	Metals & Mining	SARDAEN	EQ	INE385C01021
Saregama India Ltd	Media Entertainment & Publication	SAREGAMA	EQ	INE979A01025
Schaeffler India Ltd.	Automobile and Auto Components	SCHAEFFLER	EQ	INE513A01022
Schneider Electric Infrastructure Ltd.	Capital Goods	SCHNEIDER	EQ	INE839M01018
Shipping Corporation of India Ltd.	Services	SCI	EQ	INE109A01011
Shree Cement Ltd.	Construction Materials	SHREECEM	EQ	INE070A01015
Shriram Finance Ltd.	Financial Services	SHRIRAMFIN	EQ	INE721A01047
Shyam Metalics and Energy Ltd.	Capital Goods	SHYAMMETL	EQ	INE810G01011
Siemens Energy India Ltd.	Capital Goods	ENRIN	EQ	INE1NPP01017
Siemens Ltd.	Capital Goods	SIEMENS	EQ	INE003A01024
Signatureglobal (India) Ltd.	Realty	SIGNATURE	EQ	INE903U01023
Sobha Ltd.	Realty	SOBHA	EQ	INE671H01015
Solar Industries India Ltd.	Chemicals	SOLARINDS	EQ	INE343H01029
Sona BLW Precision Forgings Ltd.	Automobile and Auto Components	SONACOMS	EQ	INE073K01018
Sonata Software Ltd.	Information Technology	SONATSOFTW	EQ	INE269A01021
Star Health and Allied Insurance Company Ltd.	Financial Services	STARHEALTH	EQ	INE575P01011
State Bank of India	Financial Services	SBIN	EQ	INE062A01020
Steel Authority of India Ltd.	Metals & Mining	SAIL	EQ	INE114A01011
Sumitomo Chemical India Ltd.	Chemicals	SUMICHEM	EQ	INE258G01013
Sun Pharmaceutical Industries Ltd.	Healthcare	SUNPHARMA	EQ	INE044A01036
Sun TV Network Ltd.	Media Entertainment & Publication	SUNTV	EQ	INE424H01027
Sundaram Finance Ltd.	Financial Services	SUNDARMFIN	EQ	INE660A01013
Supreme Industries Ltd.	Capital Goods	SUPREMEIND	EQ	INE195A01028
Supreme Petrochem Ltd.	Chemicals	SPLPETRO	EQ	INE663A01033
Suzlon Energy Ltd.	Capital Goods	SUZLON	EQ	INE040H01021
Swan Corp Ltd.	Chemicals	SWANCORP	EQ	INE665A01038
Swiggy Ltd.	Consumer Services	SWIGGY	EQ	INE00H001014
Syngene International Ltd.	Healthcare	SYNGENE	EQ	INE398R01022
Syrma SGS Technology Ltd.	Capital Goods	SYRMA	EQ	INE0DYJ01015
TBO Tek Ltd.	Consumer Services	TBOTEK	EQ	INE673O01025
TVS Motor Company Ltd.	Automobile and Auto Components	TVSMOTOR	EQ	INE494B01023
Tata Capital Ltd.	Financial Services	TATACAP	EQ	INE976I01016
Tata Chemicals Ltd.	Chemicals	TATACHEM	EQ	INE092A01019
Tata Communications Ltd.	Telecommunication	TATACOMM	EQ	INE151A01013
Tata Consultancy Services Ltd.	Information Technology	TCS	EQ	INE467B01029
Tata Consumer Products Ltd.	Fast Moving Consumer Goods	TATACONSUM	EQ	INE192A01025
Tata Elxsi Ltd.	Information Technology	TATAELXSI	EQ	INE670A01012
Tata Investment Corporation Ltd.	Financial Services	TATAINVEST	EQ	INE672A01026
Tata Motors Ltd.	Capital Goods	TMCV	EQ	INE1TAE01010
Tata Motors Passenger Vehicles Ltd.	Automobile and Auto Components	TMPV	EQ	INE155A01022
Tata Power Co. Ltd.	Power	TATAPOWER	EQ	INE245A01021
Tata Steel Ltd.	Metals & Mining	TATASTEEL	EQ	INE081A01020
Tata Technologies Ltd.	Information Technology	TATATECH	EQ	INE142M01025
Tata Teleservices (Maharashtra) Ltd.	Telecommunication	TTML	EQ	INE517B01013
Tech Mahindra Ltd.	Information Technology	TECHM	EQ	INE669C01036
Techno Electric & Engineering Company Ltd.	Construction	TECHNOE	EQ	INE285K01026
Tega Industries Ltd.	Capital Goods	TEGA	EQ	INE011K01018
Tejas Networks Ltd.	Telecommunication	TEJASNET	EQ	INE010J01012
Tenneco Clean Air India Ltd.	Automobile and Auto Components	TENNIND	EQ	INE19RI01016
The New India Assurance Company Ltd.	Financial Services	NIACL	EQ	INE470Y01017
The Ramco Cements Ltd.	Construction Materials	RAMCOCEM	EQ	INE331A01037
Thermax Ltd.	Capital Goods	THERMAX	EQ	INE152A01029
Timken India Ltd.	Capital Goods	TIMKEN	EQ	INE325A01013
Titagarh Rail Systems Ltd.	Capital Goods	TITAGARH	EQ	INE615H01020
Titan Company Ltd.	Consumer Durables	TITAN	EQ	INE280A01028
Torrent Pharmaceuticals Ltd.	Healthcare	TORNTPHARM	EQ	INE685A01028
Torrent Power Ltd.	Power	TORNTPOWER	EQ	INE813H01021
Transformers and Rectifiers (India) Ltd.	Capital Goods	TARIL	EQ	INE763I01026
Travel Food Services Ltd.	Consumer Services	TRAVELFOOD	EQ	INE103V01028
Trent Ltd.	Consumer Services	TRENT	EQ	INE849A01020
Trident Ltd.	Textiles	TRIDENT	EQ	INE064C01022
Triveni Turbine Ltd.	Capital Goods	TRITURBINE	EQ	INE152M01016
Tube Investments of India Ltd.	Automobile and Auto Components	TIINDIA	EQ	INE974X01010
UCO Bank	Financial Services	UCOBANK	EQ	INE691A01018
UNO Minda Ltd.	Automobile and Auto Components	UNOMINDA	EQ	INE405E01023
UPL Ltd.	Chemicals	UPL	EQ	INE628A01036
UTI Asset Management Company Ltd.	Financial Services	UTIAMC	EQ	INE094J01016
UltraTech Cement Ltd.	Construction Materials	ULTRACEMCO	EQ	INE481G01011
Union Bank of India	Financial Services	UNIONBANK	EQ	INE692A01016
United Breweries Ltd.	Fast Moving Consumer Goods	UBL	EQ	INE686F01025
United Spirits Ltd.	Fast Moving Consumer Goods	UNITDSPR	EQ	INE854D01024
Urban Company Ltd.	Consumer Services	URBANCO	EQ	INE0CAZ01013
Usha Martin Ltd.	Capital Goods	USHAMART	EQ	INE228A01035
Vardhman Textiles Ltd.	Textiles	VTL	EQ	INE825A01020
Varun Beverages Ltd.	Fast Moving Consumer Goods	VBL	EQ	INE200M01039
Vedanta Ltd.	Metals & Mining	VEDL	EQ	INE205A01025
Vijaya Diagnostic Centre Ltd.	Healthcare	VIJAYA	EQ	INE043W01024
Vishal Mega Mart Ltd.	Consumer Services	VMM	EQ	INE01EA01019
Vodafone Idea Ltd.	Telecommunication	IDEA	EQ	INE669E01016
Voltas Ltd.	Consumer Durables	VOLTAS	EQ	INE226A01021
Waaree Energies Ltd.	Capital Goods	WAAREEENER	EQ	INE377N01017
Welspun Corp Ltd.	Capital Goods	WELCORP	EQ	INE191B01025
Welspun Living Ltd.	Textiles	WELSPUNLIV	EQ	INE192B01031
Whirlpool of India Ltd.	Consumer Durables	WHIRLPOOL	EQ	INE716A01013
Wipro Ltd.	Information Technology	WIPRO	EQ	INE075A01022
Wockhardt Ltd.	Healthcare	WOCKPHARMA	EQ	INE049B01025
Yes Bank Ltd.	Financial Services	YESBANK	EQ	INE528G01035
ZF Commercial Vehicle Control Systems India Ltd.	Automobile and Auto Components	ZFCVINDIA	EQ	INE342J01019
Zee Entertainment Enterprises Ltd.	Media Entertainment & Publication	ZEEL	EQ	INE256A01028
Zen Technologies Ltd.	Capital Goods	ZENTEC	EQ	INE251B01027
Zensar Technolgies Ltd.	Information Technology	ZENSARTECH	EQ	INE520A01027
Zydus Lifesciences Ltd.	Healthcare	ZYDUSLIFE	EQ	INE010B01027
Zydus Wellness Ltd.	Fast Moving Consumer Goods	ZYDUSWELL	EQ	INE768C01028
eClerx Services Ltd.	Services	ECLERX	EQ	INE738I01010

== Other Notable Indices ==
NIFTY 50: Top 50 listed companies on the NSE. A diversified 50 stock index accounting for 13 sectors of the Indian economy.

NIFTY Next 50: Also called NIFTY Juniors. Represents 50 companies from NIFTY 100 after excluding the NIFTY 50 companies.

NIFTY 100: Diversified 100 stock index representing major sectors of the economy. NIFTY 100 represents top 100 companies based on full market capitalization from NIFTY 500.

NIFTY 200: Designed to reflect the behavior and performance of large and mid-market capitalization companies.

== Index Methodology ==
Eligibility Criteria for Selection of Constituent Stocks:

All equity shares listed on the NSE are eligible for inclusion in the NIFTY indices. Convertible stock, bonds, warrants, rights, and preferred stock that provide a guaranteed fixed return are not eligible for inclusion in the NIFTY indices.

To be considered for inclusion in NIFTY 500 index, companies must form part of eligible universe. The eligible universe includes:

i. Companies ranked within top 800 based on both average daily turnover and average daily full market capitalization based on previous six months period data

ii. Companies traded for at least 90% of days during the previous six months period

iii. Securities will be included if rank based on full market capitalization is among top 350

iv. Securities will be included if full market capitalization is 1.50 times of the last constituent in NIFTY 500

v. Securities will be excluded if rank based on full market capitalization falls below 800

vi. Eligibility criteria for newly listed security is checked based on the data for a three-month period instead of a six-month period

Index Re-Balancing: Index is re-balanced on semi-annual basis. The cut-off date is January 31 and July 31 of each year, i.e. For semi-annual review of indices, average data for six months ending the cut-off date is considered. Four weeks prior notice is given to market from the date of change.

Index Governance: A professional team manages all NSE indices. There is a three-tier governance structure comprising the Board of Directors of NSE Indices Limited, the Index Advisory Committee (Equity) and the Index Maintenance Sub-Committee.

== See also ==
- NIFTY 50
- BSE SENSEX
