= Benu Gopal Bangur =

Indian businessman chairman of Shree Cement

- Born: 1931 (age 94–95)
- Education: University of Calcutta
- Occupation: Businessman
- Known for: Heir, member of Bangur family
- Title: Chairman, Shree Cement
- Spouse: Widowed
- Children: 2, including Hari Mohan Bangur

Benu Gopal Bangur (born 1931) is an Indian billionaire businessman, and the chairman of Shree Cement.

== Early life ==
Bangur was born in 1931 in a Marwari Jain family. He was educated at Calcutta University.

== Career ==
His grandfather, Mungee Ram Bangur, a Calcutta stockbroker, and his brother Ram Coowar Bangur, started the Bangur business empire in the late 19th century. In 1991, the business was split into five groups, between Balbhadra Das Bangur, Niwas Bangur, Kumar Bangur and Benu Gopal Bangur (all grandsons of Mungee Ram) and Laxmi Niwas Bangur (grandson of Ram Coowar).

According to Forbes, Bangur has a net worth of $6.6 billion, as of August 2024.

== Personal life ==
Bangur is widowed with two children and lives in Kolkata. His son, Hari Mohan Bangur, has been running Shree Cement since 1990.
