= Grasim Bhiwani Textiles =

- Company type: Subsidiary
- Industry: Textiles
- Founded: 2007
- Headquarters: Bhiwani, Haryana, India
- Parent: Donear Group
- Website: gbtl.in

GBTL Grasim (formerly known as Grasim Bhiwani Textile Ltd) is an Indian manufacturing company engaged in the production of polyester-viscose fabric. It was previously a part of Grasim Industries, a flagship company of the Aditya Birla Group.

In 2017, Grasim Bhiwani Textiles was acquired by the Donear Group, a Mumbai-based textile company Later that same year, Grasim Bhiwani Textiles signed Bollywood actor Amitabh Bachchan as its brand ambassador.

== Brands ==
- Grasim
- Graviera
