= Grasim Industries =

Indian industrial conglomerate

Grasim Industries Limited
- Type: Public
- Traded as: BSE: 500300; NSE: GRASIM; NSE NIFTY 50 Constituent
- ISIN: INE047A01021
- Industry: Fibre; Paints; Chemicals; Agrochemicals; Textiles; Insulator
- Founded: 1947; 79 years ago
- Headquarters: Mumbai, Maharashtra, India
- Area served: Worldwide
- Key people: Kumar Mangalam Birla (Chairman); H K Agarwal (MD)
- Revenue: ▲₹175,431 crore (US$18 billion) (2026)
- Operating income: ▲₹25,872 crore (US$2.7 billion) (2026)
- Net income: ▲₹10,300 crore (US$1.1 billion) (2026)
- Total assets: ▲₹569,555 crore (US$59 billion) (2026)
- Total equity: ▲₹103,470 crore (US$11 billion) (2026)
- Number of employees: 44,790 (2026)
- Parent: Aditya Birla Group
- Subsidiaries: UltraTech Cement; Aditya Birla Capital
- Website: www.grasim.com

Grasim Industries Limited is an Indian manufacturing company based in Mumbai. Since its inception in 1947 as a textile manufacturer, Grasim has diversified into textile raw materials like viscose staple fiber (VSF) and viscose filament yarn, chemicals and insulators, along with cement and financial services through its subsidiaries UltraTech Cement and Aditya Birla Capital respectively. The company is a part of the Aditya Birla Group.

== History ==
Grasim Industries Limited was incorporated in 1947.

Indo-Thai Synthetics Company Ltd was incorporated in 1969 in Thailand, and started operations in 1970. This was Aditya Birla Group's first foray into international venture. Aditya Birla Group incorporated P.T. Elegant Textiles in 1973 in Indonesia. Thai Rayon incorporated in 1974; this was the second company in Thailand, operating in Viscose Rayon Staple Fiber. Century Textiles Co. Ltd. was taken over by Aditya Birla Group in 1974; this company is a weaving and dyeing plant manufacturing and exporting variety of synthetic fabrics. PT Sunrise Bumi Textiles incorporated in 1979; it produces yarn exported to over 30 countries in 6 continents. P.T Indo Bharat Rayon, incorporated in 1980, produces Viscose Staple Fiber in Indonesia. Thai Polyphosphates and Chemicals was started in 1984 in Thailand to produce Sodium Phosphates, and has merged with Thai Epoxy and Allied Products Company Limited (1992), Thai Sulphites and Chemicals Company Limited (1995) to form Aditya Birla Chemicals Ltd. This company supplies to sectors such as food, textiles, electrical and electronics, composites, leather, plastics and automobiles. PT Indo Liberty Textiles was incorporated in 1995 to manufacture synthetic spun yarn.

In 1985, the firm's activities in its Mavoor facility ran into controversies after it shut down, first temporarily and later on, permanently.

In the late 1990s and later, the focus was the textile business following the end of Multi-Fiber Arrangement (MFA).

AV Cell Inc., a joint venture between Aditya Birla Group and Tembec, Canada, established operations in 1998 to produce softwood and hardwood pulp for the purpose of internal consumption among different units of the Group.

In 2012, Grasim Industries Ltd. and Tembec, Canada acquired AV Nackawic Inc., which produces dissolving pulp.

== Listed subsidiaries ==
In 2004, Grasim acquired UltraTech Cement from Larsen & Toubro. In 2010, Grasim demerged its cement subsidiary, Samruddhi Cement, which contributed 76% of the company's turnover in the previous financial year. Later that year, Samruddhi Cement was merged into UltraTech Cement.

In 2017, it demerged Aditya Birla Capital, its financial services arm, which included consumer finance, insurance and asset management divisions among others. After the demerger, Grasim continued to hold a 55% stake in Aditya Birla Capital.

== Operations ==
Grasim is the largest exporter of Viscose Rayon Fiber in the country, with exports to over 50 countries. Grasim is headquartered in Mumbai and also has plants at Nagda (Madhya Pradesh), Kharach (Kosamba, Gujarat), Veraval (Gujarat), Bharuch (Vilayat GIDC, Gujarat) and Harihar, (Davangere, Karnataka).

Grasim Industries Ltd. supplies Viscose Staple Fiber (VSF). The Group's VSF business operates through its three companies – Grasim Industries in India, Indo Bharat rayon in Indonesia, Thai Rayon Corporation in Thailand, which also oversees its Chinese operations at Birla Jingwei Fibres, China.

By 2021, Grasim industries, the flagship company of the global conglomerate Aditya Birla Group, entered the paints business with an investment of INR 5,000 crore over three years. Which was later increased to a capex of INR 10,000 crore over the same period of time thus trying to disrupt the market.

=== Former businesses ===
- In 2008, Grasim sold its sponge iron business to the Welspun Group for ₹1030 crore.
- In 2015, it sold its consumer products business to Future Group.
- In 2017, Grasim sold its wholly owned subsidiary Grasim Bhiwani Textiles to Donear Group.
- In 2020, Grasim sold its entire stake in Indo Gulf Fertilisers to Indorama Corporation for ₹2649 crore.

== Other mentions ==
Grasim Industries operates Private Harihar Airport In Harihar, Karnataka. The airport served as an air strip for private charter service.
