= Nestlé India =

Indian subsidiary of Nestlé

Nestlé India Limited
- Type: Public
- Traded as: BSE: 500790; NSE: NESTLEIND; NSE NIFTY 50 constituent
- ISIN: INE239A01016
- Industry: Food processing
- Founded: 28 March 1959 (67 years ago)
- Headquarters: Nestle House, Jacaranda Marg, 'M' Block, DLF Phase II, Gurgaon, Haryana, India
- Area served: India
- Key people: Suresh Narayanan (CMD); David Steven McDaniel (CFO); Martin Roemkens (Executive Director)
- Brands: Maggi; Nescafé; Cerelac; KitKat; Nestea; Polo; Milkybar; Milo; Gerber
- Revenue: ▲₹20,201 crore (US$2.2 billion) (2025)
- Operating income: ▲₹4,156 crore (US$440 million) (2025)
- Net income: ▲₹3,207 crore (US$340 million) (2025)
- Total assets: ▲₹12,193 crore (US$1.3 billion) (2025)
- Total equity: ▲₹4,010 crore (US$430 million) (2025)
- Number of employees: 7,649
- Parent: Nestlé (62.76%)
- Website: nestle.in
- Footnotes; Financials as of 31 March 2025.

Nestlé India Limited is the Indian subsidiary of Nestlé which is a Swiss multinational company. The company is headquartered in Gurgaon, Haryana. The company's products include food, beverages, chocolate, and confectioneries.

The company was incorporated on 28 March 1959 and was promoted by Nestle Alimentana S.A. via a subsidiary, Nestle Holdings Ltd. As of 2020, the parent company Nestlé owns 62.76% of Nestlé India. The company has 9 production facilities in various locations across India.

== History ==
Nestlé India is one of the largest players in India's fast-moving consumer goods sector and has a long history in the country.

- Nestlé India Limited was incorporated at New Delhi on 28 March 1959 and was promoted by Nestle Alimentana S.A. via a wholly owned subsidiary, Nestle Holdings Ltd., Nassau, Bahamas.
- The company built their first production facility in 1961 at Moga, in the Indian state of Punjab.
- Nestlé's second plant was set up at Choladi in Tamil Nadu, the plant was built primarily to process the tea grown in the area.
- In 1989, the company established a factory at Nanjangud in Karnataka.
- The company entered the confectionery business in 1990 by introducing Nestlé premium chocolate.
- In 1991, they started the production of soya based products through a joint venture with the BM Khaitan group.
- In the year 1995 and 1997 Nestlé established two facilities in Goa at Ponda and Bicholim respectively.
- In April 2000 they entered the liquid milk and iced tea markets.
- 2006 marked the year when the company set up its 7th factory at Pantnagar in Uttarakhand.
- The company opened another plant in Karnataka in 2011 bringing up its total plants in India to eight.
- In October 2020, Nestle India announced investment of ₹2,600 crore for a new plant at Sanand in Gujarat. Initial phase of production commenced from 1 October 2021.
- In 2023, the company announced that it would set up a food processing unit at Mundamba in Odisha with an investment of ₹894 crore.
- In October 2026, Nestle India announced internal leadership restructuring across its Nutrition, Dairy, and Confectionery divisions, effective 1 January 2027. Gopichandar Jagatheesan was appointed Business Executive Officer (BEO) for Nutrition and Dairy, succeeding Vineet Singh, who transitioned to a role at a Nestlé affiliate. Mansi Khanna was nominated to succeed Jagatheesan as BEO for Chocolates and Confectionery.

== Production ==
Nestlé India currently has 9 manufacturing facilities across India. They are at:

1. Moga, Punjab
2. Samalkha, Haryana
3. Nanjangud, Karnataka
4. Choladi, Tamil Nadu
5. Ponda, Goa
6. Bicholim, Goa
7. Pantnagar, Uttarakhand
8. Tahliwal, Himachal Pradesh
9. Sanand, Gujarat

== Controversy ==
In June 2015, Nestlé India's instant noodles product Maggi was banned by the Government of Delhi for a 15-day period after lead and monosodium glutamate in samples of the product were found to be beyond permissible limits. On 5 June 2015, Maggi noodles were banned nationwide by the Food Safety and Standards Authority of India. The ban was overturned on 13 August 2015 following the Bombay High Court's order and samples of Maggi Noodles were ordered to be retested within 6 weeks by three labs authorized by the National Accreditation Board for Testing and Calibration Laboratories. Nestle was fined ₹45 lakh for the incident by the district administration. Between 5 June 2015 when the noodles were first banned and 1 September 2015, Nestlé recalled 38,000 tonnes of Maggi Noodles from stores and incinerated them at 11 cement plants across India. Nestlé eventually cleared the Bombay High Court mandated lab tests and Maggi Noodles were allowed to be manufactured and sold again.

In March 2025, SEBI warned Nestle India over breach of insider trading regulations.

On 18 September 2026, FSSAI initiated three legal actions against Nestlé India over alleged no-compliance involving its infant nutrition products, including NAN Excella Pro Stage 1 and Lactogen Pro 1. However, Nestlé India rejected the claims, says products comply with regulations; and labels were approved by expert panel.

On 3 October 2026, FSSAI declared a sample of Nestle India's low fat dairy whitener unsafe and substandard. the sample was collected during an inspection at the Lalit hotel in New Delhi.
