= Mundamba =

Village in Odisha, India

Coordinates: 20.032255°N 85.528601°E

Mundamba is a village in Khordha tehsil of Khordha district in Odisha in India. It is located approximately 1 kilometre (0.62 mi) from Jankia.

The total geographical land of the village is 1,195 acres (484 ha), including 576 acres (233 ha) of government owned land, with the remainder held privately.

Mundamba's temples include Lokanath temple, Laxmi Narayan temple, Mahavir temple and Bhaghei temple.

This is 19 kilometers from Kordha, has few govt offices irrigation office, forest office, Panchayat office, police station, post office, schools from 1st til 10th (primary school 1 to 5, middle school 6–7, and high school 8–10). This place is a junction to many villages, from where people travel to Khudha, Bhubaneswar, BaluGan, Puri. The NH-5 and New Jagannath Sadak (Road) meet here, facilitating residents' travel to nearby cities.

There is a good football ground, where the inter state football matches held many times in past. The famous Hanuman temple on top of a small hill is a famous place. The yearly festival in April every month, which occurs for nine days, attracts many devotees to the beautiful place to be blessed.
