= FMCG in India =

Fast-moving consumer goods industry

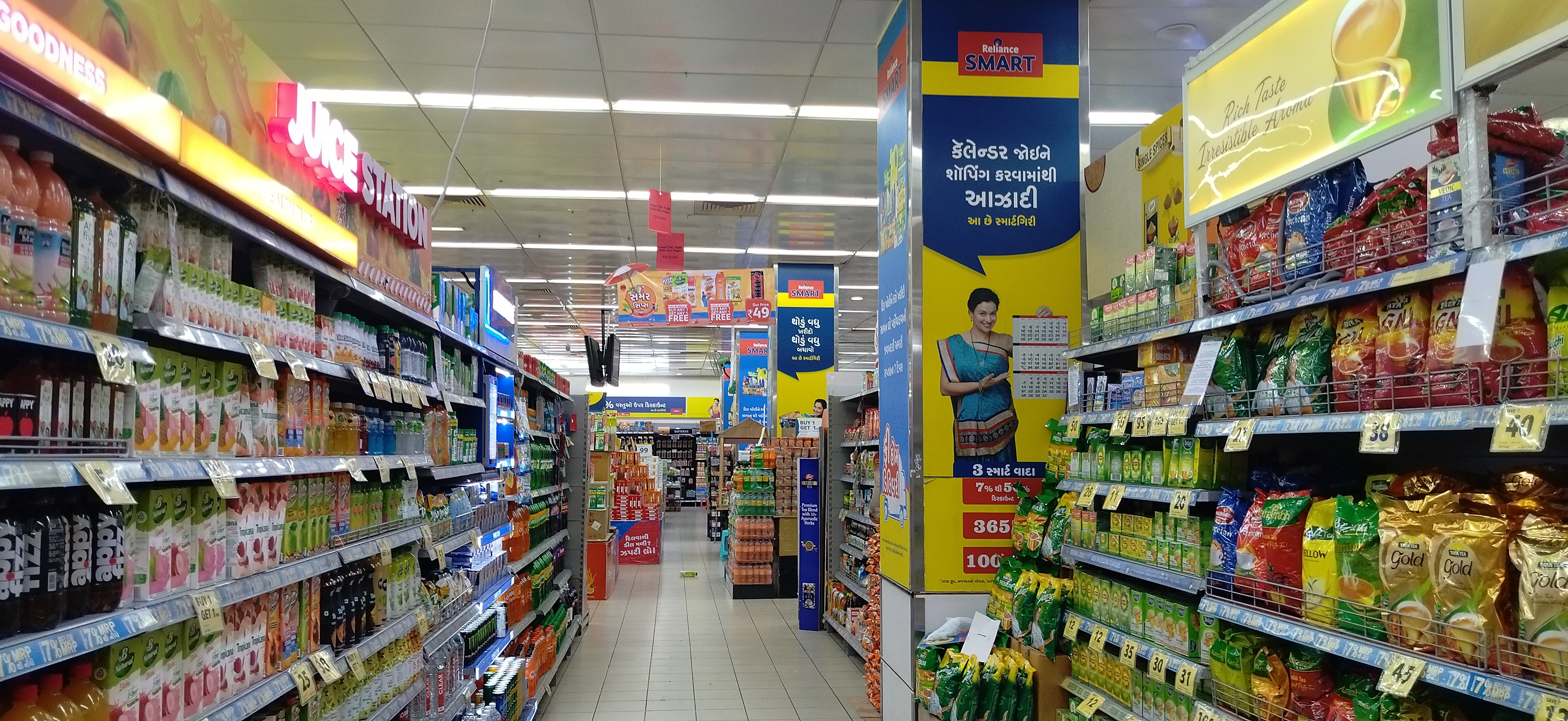
A supermarket aisle.

The fast-moving consumer goods (FMCG) industry or consumer packaged goods (CPG) industry is mainly responsible for producing, distributing and marketing fast-moving consumer goods. The FMCG industry is the fourth largest sector in the Indian economy. Household and personal care products accounts for 50% of the sales in the industry, healthcare accounts for 31-32% and food and beverage accounts for the remaining 18-19%.

== Market size and projected growth rate ==
In the last 10 years, the revenue in FMCG industry in India has been growing at the rate of 21.4%. There was a drastic change in revenues in FMCG sector growing from US$31.6 billion to US$52.8 from 2011 to 2017-2018 respectively. FMCG industry in India is expected to grow at the rate of 27.9% CAGR (Compounded Annual Growth Rate) to sum to US$103.7 billion by 2020. Additionally, the rural FMCG market is projected to grow at a CAGR of 14.6% to reach US$100 billion by 2020 and US$220 billion by 2025. The rural setting accounts for 45% revenue share while the urban setting dominates with 55% revenue share of the total revenue of the FMCG industry. More than 65% of people in India stay in rural places and those people spend around 50% of their total expenditure on FMCG products. The number of people buying consumer goods online in India is projected to reach 850 million by 2025.

=== Driving factors leading to growth rate ===
- Increased population of working women
- Increased disposable income and growing per capita expenditure
- Increased purchasing power of the customers
- Increased awareness of online shopping
- Higher brand recognition and consciousness
- Constant change in consumer preference
- Banking policies and government's regulations
- Growing interest for foreign investors

=== Market share (by revenue) ===
Nestlé logo

ITC Limited Logo

Company's Name	Market share (2018)
ITC	12%
Hindustan Unilever	10%
Nestlé	3%
Britannia	3%
Dabur	2%
Godrej	2%
Marico	1%
GSK	1%
Colgate-Palmolive	1%

== Characteristics ==
=== Technology ===
Since the emergence of the internet, people have adopted the research online, purchase offline (ROPO) method. As a result, FMCG companies have installed advantaged manufacturing machines for better quality purpose and have decreased their profit margin to match with their competitors.

=== Marketing drive and research ===
Indian customers prioritise getting the best deals possible and as a result are less likely to stay loyal to a brand. Thus, FMCG companies are constantly trying to influence customers with their promotional deals and many firms offer combo deals to attract customers to buy their product.

=== Low capital intensity ===
Most of the companies operating in FMCG require relatively less capital for investments in manufacturing plants, machinery, equipment and other fixed assets. The turnover is typically about five to eight times the invested capital at a fully upgraded manufacturing plant. Companies have low capital intensity as transactions in businesses are still carried out on credit and cash basis.

=== High initial launch cost ===
Unlike FMCG industry in the US which is dominated by few big companies, India's industry is highly fragmented. Increasing the market share for companies is getting more challenging due to increase in number of competitors. Promotions and advertisements, cost of product development, testing market compatibility, market research and mainly, the launch of the product to create awareness requires high initial costs.

=== Trend towards Natural Products ===
The premium end of the market is shifting towards natural products, which are produced entirely from naturally occurring ingredients.

== Evolution ==
Between 1950 and 1980, there was limited investment in the FMCG sector. Local people had lower purchasing power, which meant that people opted for necessity products rather than premium products. Indian government was inclined towards favouring the local shops and retailers. Between 1980 and 1990, people wanted more variety of products which encouraged FMCG companies to increase the availability of products. FMCG Industry started getting traction and other companies started entering the industry. Media industry in India also boomed during the same time which gave new companies even more incentive to make their business profitable. Prior to 1991, when globalisation and liberalisation occurred in India, western apparels and foreign food products were not available to local customers. Common people weren't very aware of brand recognition. After 1991, FMCG industry was inspired by the international companies which also allowed government intervention to incentivise foreign FMCG companies to operate in India.

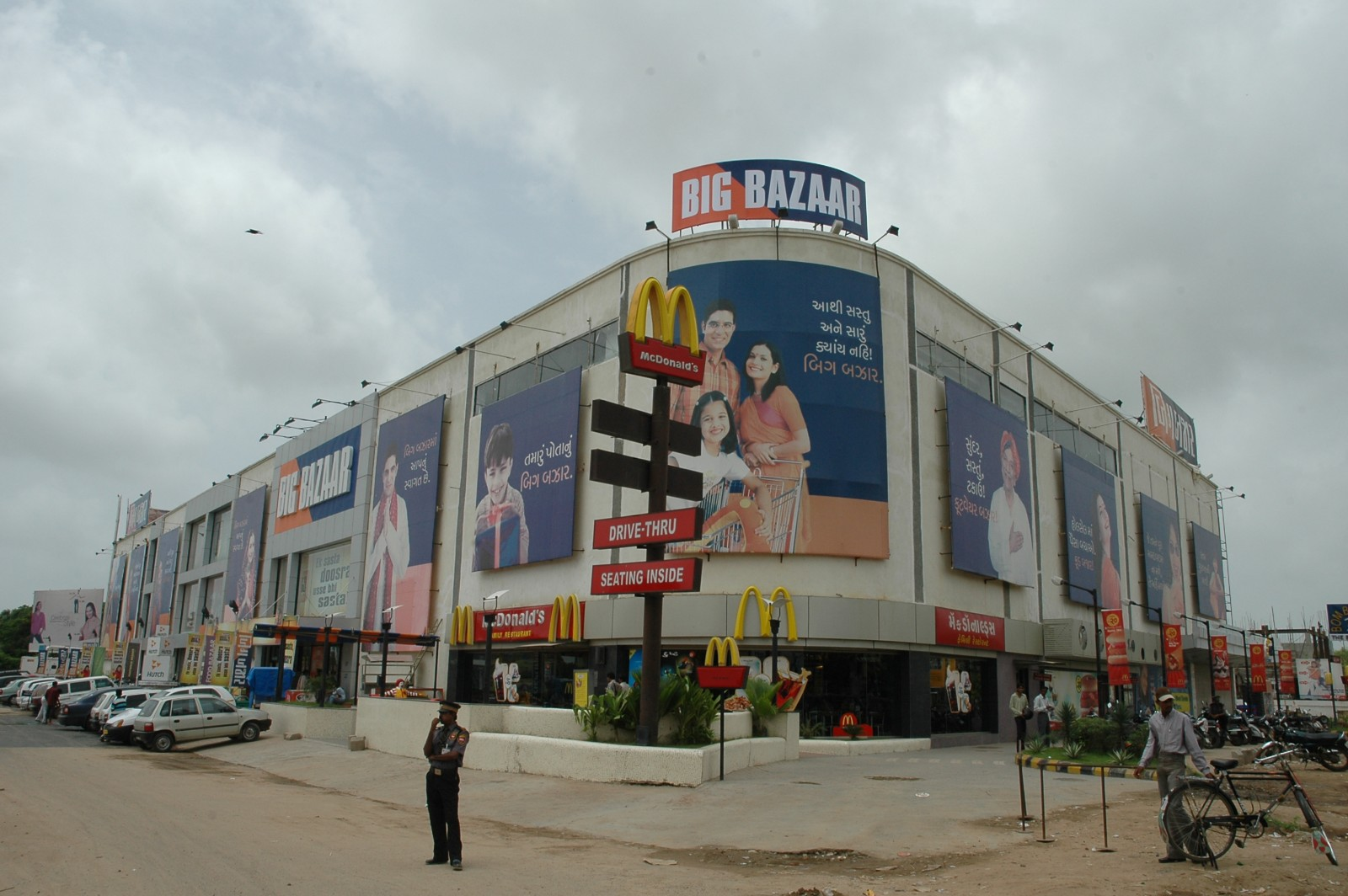
Big Bazaar store in Ahmedabad, Gujarat

The Indian FMCG industry generates massive employment opportunities and currently employs more than 3 million people. Departmental stores, grocery stores, and supermarkets are the places where consumers buy the necessary products for daily consumption. In the 21st century, people don't want to move across different stores to acquire the common household goods. Hence, the introduction of supermarkets, where customers have a variety of choices for different household products, into localities are proving to be extremely convenient to the customers. Some of the major supermarket chains in India are: Reliance Retail, D-Mart, MORE, Spencer's, Spar, HyperCity, and Star Bazaar. Although the operations of supermarkets are profitable, local grocery stores are suffering due to lack of variety of products. Unlike other emerging FMCG industry around the world, FMCG sector in India is still quite conventional. Despite street markets still being one of the most visited places for shopping in urban and rural settings, online platforms are leading the way to the buying of FMCG products.

== Trends ==
=== Increase in number of government initiatives ===
In the past few years, there are increasing number of initiatives like farm loan waivers, Direct Benefit Transfer (DBT) and development of infrastructure in rural areas. Under the Union budget 2019–2020, the focus has been shifting towards education, agriculture, healthcare, infrastructure, tax rebate and micro, small and medium enterprises (Ministry of Micro, Small and Medium Enterprises). These initiatives are projected to have an impact by increasing the minimum wages of common people, especially in rural areas. Thus, any increment in income will be directly proportional to demand in FMCG products.

=== Changes in lifestyle and traditional culture ===
Document for Goods and Service Tax (GST)

Change in lifestyle and traditional culture is also having a positive impact on the FMCG industry. The population in urban areas are diverging towards premium products as opposed to essential goods because of rise in income of the middle-class people. This has also led to FMCG companies to rethink strategies as people as willingly to pay high prices for premium products.

=== Changes in policies and regulations ===
Many global companies operating in the FMCG industry are eyeing the Indian market due to the government's policies and regulations. Government's introduction of Relaxation of license rules and approval of 100% foreign direct investment (FDI) in single-brand retail stores and 51% in the multi-brands stores are some investing opportunities for global companies to establish their base in India. Regulatory frameworks like Exercise duty, National Food Security Act, and Telecom Regulatory Authority of India (TRAI) advertising regulations are some main changes in policies and regulations directly affecting the Indian FMCG industry. With the implementation of Goods and Services Tax in FY18 (July 1, 2018), GST council has reduced the tax rates down to 5% on most of the processed food items, increasing the consumption of food products. Other personal care products have also seen a reduction in GST to 18% against the previous 23-24%.

=== Rising advertisement cost by FMCG companies ===
FMCG companies in India have increased their expenditure cost for sales promotions and advertisements by 10-20%. Every year, these companies invest more and more in advertisement to establish a strong customer base and also as a strategy to reduce market competition.

=== Shift towards health and functional food ===
Indian agricultural processors and traditional staple grain companies have increasingly expanded into the functional consumer goods segment. Companies have launched health oriented packaged products including functional cooking oils (like KRBL Ltd launced India Gate Uplife) targeted at digestive wellness and weight management.

== See also ==
- Final good
- Product/process distinction
