= Kodla =

- village
- Country: India
- State: Karnataka
- District: Gulbarga
- Talukas: Sedam

Population (2001)
  - Total: 5,567

Languages
  - Official: Kannada
- Time zone: UTC+5:30 (IST)

Kodla is a village in the southern state of Karnataka, India. It is located in the Sedam taluk of Kalaburagi district in Karnataka.

== Demographics ==
As of 2001 India census, Kodla had a population of 5567 with 2684 males and 2883 females.

== See also ==
- Gulbarga
- Districts of Karnataka
