= Shree Cement =

Indian cement company

Shree Cement Limited
- Company type: Public
- Traded as: BSE: 500387; NSE: SHREECEM
- Industry: Building materials
- Headquarters: Kolkata, West Bengal (corp.) Beawar, Rajasthan (regd.)
- Key people: Hari Mohan Bangur (Chairman); Prashant Bangur (Vice Chairman); Neeraj Akhoury (Managing Director); Benu Gopal Bangur (Chairman Emeritus)
- Products: Cement, ready-mix concrete
- Revenue: ▼₹19,872 crore (US$2.1 billion) (2025)
- Operating income: ▼₹4,523 crore (US$470 million) (2025)
- Net income: ▼₹1,123 crore (US$120 million) (2025)
- Total assets: ▲₹28,491 crore (US$3.0 billion) (2025)
- Total equity: ▲₹21,578 crore (US$2.3 billion) (2025)
- Number of employees: 7,022 (31 March 2025)
- Website: www.shreecement.com
- Footnotes / references Financials as of as of 31 March 2025.

Shree Cement is an Indian cement manufacturer, founded in Beawar, Rajasthan, in 1979. Headquartered in Kolkata, it is India's third largest cement producer group by capacity and third largest cement company by market capitalisation. Shree Cement has an installed cement production capacity of 66.8 mtpa including overseas operations. It also produces and sells power under the name Shree Power (captive power plant) and Shree Mega Power.

== History ==
Shree Cement was incorporated in 1979 by Benu Gopal Bangur. In 1983, it commissioned its first plant in Beawar, Rajasthan, with production beginning in 1985. In 1995, Bangur's family gained full control of the business. Bangur's son Hari Mohan Bangur, a graduate from IIT Bombay, is the current head of the company. In 2003, Hari Mohan Bangur's son Prashant Bangur also joined the company.

In 2014, Shree Cement acquired a grinding unit in Panipat, Haryana.

In 2018, Shree Cement acquired UAE-based Union Cement, which had a capacity of 4 mtpa in the Emirate of Ras Al Khaimah, for $305 million.

In 2019, the company raised ₹2,399 crore through a qualified institutional placement. In December 2023, it commissioned a kiln at its plant in Nawalgarh, Rajasthan.

In 2024, the company entered the ready-mix concrete (RMC) segment.

== Operations ==
As of 2025, the company has a production capacity of 62.8 MTPA in India, and 4 MTPA in the United Arab Emirates. It operates integrated and grinding units in 18 locations in India.

In 2023, its subsidiary commissioned a new 3 MTPA grinding unit in Purulia district, West Bengal. In April 2025, the company commissioned a 3 MTPA grinding unit in Etah, Uttar Pradesh. It also has integrated plants in Kodla, Karnataka, and Guntur, Andhra Pradesh.

=== Power generation ===
Shree Cement also generates electricity for use in its plants and for sale in the market, with an installed power capacity of 1 GW as of 2025.

== Controversies ==
In 2018, six workers died at the under-construction Shree Cement factory at Kodla near Sedam in Kalaburagi district, Karnataka, after a crane collapsed. In 2024, four workers died in separate incidents at the same factory within two months, prompting the district collector to launch an investigation into the factory's safety protocols.

In February 2025, after another worker died at the same factory, a group of workers were filmed dragging his body and dumping it outside the premises. Six workers were arrested under various sections of the Bharatiya Nyaya Sanhita Act.
