= NBFC and MFI in India =

Non-banking financial institutions in India

Non-Banking Financial Company (NBFC) is a company registered under the Companies Act, 2013 (originally Companies Act, 1956) of India, engaged in the business of loans and advances, acquisition of shares, stock, bonds, hire-purchase insurance business or chit-fund business, but does not include any institution whose principal business is that of agriculture, industrial activity, purchase or sale of any goods (other than securities) or providing any services and sale/purchase/construction of immovable property.

The working and operations of NBFCs are regulated by the Reserve Bank of India (RBI) within the framework of the Reserve Bank of India Act, 1934 (Chapter III-B) and the directions issued by it. On 9 November 2017, Reserve Bank of India (RBI) issued a notification outlining norms for outsourcing of functions/services by Non-Bank Financial Institution (NBFCs). As per the new norms, NBFCs cannot outsource core management functions like internal audit, management of investment portfolio, strategic and compliance functions for know your customer (KYC) norms and sanction of loans. Staff of service providers should have access to customer information only up to an extent which is required to perform the outsourced function. Boards of NBFCs should approve a code of conduct for direct sales and recovery agents. For debt collection, NBFCs and their outsourced agents should not resort to intimidation or harassment of any kind. All NBFCs’ have been directed to set up a grievance redressal machinery, which will also deal with the issues relating to services provided by the outsourced agency.

== History of NBFCs in India ==
The Reserve Bank of India Act, 1934 was amended on 1 December 1964 by Reserve Bank Amendment Act, 1963. In this, new 'Chapter III-B' introduced to Regulate 'Deposit Accepting' NBFCs.

Different types of Committees to Review existing framework of NBFCs:

=== James S. Raj Committee ===
In early 1970s Government of India asked Banking Commission to Study the Functioning of Chit Funds and Examining activities of Non-Banking Financial Intermediaries. In 1972, Banking Commission recommended Uniform Chit Fund Legislation to whole country.

Reserve Bank of India prepared Model Bill to regulate the conduct of chit funds and referred to study group under the Chairmanship of James S. Raj.

In June 1974, study group recommended ban on Prize Chit and other Schemes. It recommended the Parliament to enact a bill which ensures uniformity in the provisions applicable to chit funds throughout the country.

Accordingly, Parliament enacted two acts: Prize Chits and Money Circulation Schemes (Banning) Act, 1978 and Chit Funds Act, 1982.

=== Chakravarty Committee ===
During Planning Era, Reserve Bank of India sought to manage the money supply and develop a stable monetary system, although its monetary policy had limited success in achieving broader social and economic objectives.

In December 1982, Dr Manmohan Singh, Governor of RBI appointed committee under the Chairmanship of 'Prof. Sukhamoy Chakravarty' to review functioning of monetary system in India.

Committee recommended assessment of links among the Banking Sector, the Non-Banking Financial Institutions and the Un-organised sector to evaluate various instruments of Monetary and Credit policy in terms of their impact on the Credit System and the Economy.

During this time, the number of NBFCs grew from 7,000 in 1981 to around 30,000 in 1992.

== Types of NBFCs in India ==
Different types of NBFCs are as follows:

=== Investment and Credit Company (ICC) ===
Merging three categories of NBFCs viz asset finance companies (AFC), Loan companies (LC), Investment companies (IC) into a new category called NBFC - ICC.

CIRCULAR : RBI/2018-19/130 DNBR (PD) CC No. 097/03.10.001/2018-19 dated 22 February 2019

ICC means any company which is a financial institution carrying on as its principal business asset financing, the providing of finance whether by making loan and advances or otherwise for any activity other than its own and the acquisition of securities; and is not any other category of NBFC as defined by RBI in any of its master directions.

=== Infrastructure Finance Company (IFC) ===
Infrastructure finance companies deploys a minimum of three-fourths of their total assets in infrastructure loans. The net owned funds are more than 3 billion and a minimum crediting rating of 'A' and the Capital to Risk-Weighted Assets Ratio is 15%.

=== Infrastructure Debt Fund: Non- Banking Financial Company (IDF-NBFC) ===
IDF-NBFC is a company registered as NBFC to facilitate the flow of long term debt into infrastructure projects. IDF-NBFC raise resources through Multiple-Currency bonds of minimum 5-year maturity. Only Infrastructure Finance Companies (IFC) can sponsor IDF-NBFCs.

=== NBFC-Factors ===
NBFC Factors has principal business of factoring. Factoring is a financial transaction and a type of debtor finance

=== Gold Loan NBFCs in India ===
Over the years, gold loan NBFCs witnessed an upsurge in Indian financial market, owing mainly to the recent period of appreciation in gold price and consequent increase in the demand for gold loan by all sections of society, especially the poor and middle class to make ends meet. Though there are many NBFCs offering gold loans in India, about 95 per cent of the gold loan business is handled by three Kerala based companies, viz., Muthoot Finance, Manapuram Finance and Muthoot Fincorp. Growth of gold loan NBFCs eventuating from various factors including Asset Under Management (AUM), number of branches, and also the number of customers etc. Growth of gold loan NBFCs occurred both in terms of the size of their balance sheet and their physical presence that compelled to increase their dependence on public funds including bank finance and non-convertible debentures. Aggressive structuring of gold loans resulting from the uncomplicated, undemanding and fast process of documentation along with the higher Loan to Value (LTV) ratio include some of the major factors that augment the growth of Gold loan NBFCs.

=== Residuary Non-Banking Companies (RNBCs) ===
Residuary Non-Banking Company is a class of NBFC which is a company and has as its principal business the receiving of deposits, under any scheme or arrangement or in any other manner and not being Investment, Asset Financing, Loan Company. These companies are required to maintain investments as per directions of RBI, in addition to liquid assets.

=== Account Aggregators (AA) ===
Account Aggregators are a new class of NBFC instituted by the Reserve Bank of India in 2016. An account aggregator NBFC takes the business of account aggregation for a fee or otherwise. The NBFC once registered with the RBI, should only provide account aggregation and data to financial institutions based on customer consent. The actual mechanism should follow the consent architecture laid down by the RBI.

The account aggregators are expected to make loan applications easier for users by providing data access to financial institutions. RBI has given operating licences to four account aggregators and in-principle approvals to three NBFC account aggregators. The full list of companies is as follows:

==== AAs with An Operating License ====
1. CAMS FinServ
2. Cookiejar Technologies Pvt Ltd. (Product titled Finvu)
3. FinSec AA Solutions Private Limited (Product titled OneMoney)
4. NESL Asset Data Limited

==== AAs with In-Principle Approval ====
1. Jio Information Solutions Limited
2. Perfios Account Aggregation Services Pvt Ltd
3. Yodlee Finsoft Pvt Limited

New categorization of NBFCs as per revised framework by Reserve Bank of India (RBI):

Reserve Bank of India through a circular in October 2021, has categorized the NBFCs into three layers:

Base layer – This layer covers NBFCs which are non-systematically important, i.e., they have a lesser risk and impact on the financial system. It also covers peer-to-peer lending platforms, Account Aggregators (AA), and non-operative financial holding companies. The asset size for NBFCs in the base layer has been increased from INR 500 crores (~US$66.45 MM) to INR1000 crores (~US$132.90 MM)

Middle layer – This layer covers systematically important non-deposit taking NBFC and deposit taking NBFC having an asset size of more than INR1000 crores (~US$132.90 MM). It also covers NBFC-HFCs, NBFC-IFCs, IDF-NBFCs, and Core Investment companies (CICs).

Upper layer – This layer covers the top ten NBFCs based on asset size, as well as other systematically important NBFCs based on size, interconnectedness, complexity, liabilities, etc.

== Difference between NBFCs and banks ==
NBFCs perform functions similar to that of banks but there are a few differences-

- NBFCs provide banking services to people without holding a Bank licence,
- An NBFC cannot accept Demand Deposits,
- An NBFC is not a part of the payment and settlement system
- An NBFC cannot issue Cheques drawn on itself
- Deposit insurance facility of the Deposit Insurance and Credit Guarantee Corporation is not available for NBFC depositors, unlike banks
- An NBFC is not required to maintain Reserve Ratios (CRR, SLR etc.)
- An NBFC cannot indulge primarily in agricultural or industrial activities or sale-purchase, construction of immovable property
- Foreign Investment allowed up to 100%
- An NBFC accompanies working in Financial Body and Money handling
- Unlike banks NBFC is not required to lend loans to priority sector.

== MFI ==
Micro finance Institutions, also known as MFIs, a microfinance institution is an organisation that offers financial services to low income people. Almost all give loans to their members, and many offer insurance, deposit and other services. A great scale of organisations are regarded as microfinance institutes. They are those that offer credits and other financial services to the representatives of poor strata of population (except for extremely poor strata).

== MFIs go for NBFC licences ==
An Increasing number of microfinance institutions (MFIs) are seeking non-banking finance company (NBFC) status from RBI to get wide access to funding, including bank finance.

== Exemptions granted to NBFCs ==
As of 2021 following entities are exempted by RBI for registration requirements:

Insurance Companies - Insurance companies which falls under Insurance Regultory and Development Authority

Asset Reconstruction Companies

Stock Exchanges - Only recognised stock exchanges under authority of Securities and Exchange Board of India

Merchant Banking Companies

Stock Broking Companies - It includes brokers and sub brokers who are required to get themselves registered with SEBI

Venture Capital Funds

Housing Finance Companies - These are regulated by National Housing Bank

Nidhi Companies (Section 406 of Companies Act)

Chit Fund Companies (Section 2 of Chit Fund Act)

Alternative Investment Companies

Micro Finance Companies - The Task Force on Supportive Policy and Regulatory Framework for Microfinance set up by NABARD in 1999 provided various recommendations. Accordingly, it was decided to exempt NBFCs which are engaged in micro financing activities, licensed under Section 8 of the Companies Act, 2013, and which do not accept public deposits, from the purview of Sections 45-IA (registration), 45-IB (maintenance of liquid assets) and 45-IC (transfer of profits to the Reserve Fund) of the RBI Act, 1934.

== MFIs & SHG-Bank linkage programme ==
In a joint fact-finding study on microfinance conducted by the Reserve Bank of India and a few major banks, the following observations were made:

- Some of the microfinance institutions (MFIs) financed by banks or acting as their intermediaries or partners appear to be focusing on relatively better banked areas, including areas covered by the SHG-Bank linkage programme. Competing MFIs were operating in the same area, and trying to reach out to the same set of poor, resulting in multiple lending and overburdening of rural households.
- Many MFIs supported by banks were not engaging themselves in capacity building and empowerment of the groups to the desired extent. The MFIs were disbursing loans to the newly formed groups within 10–15 days of their formation, in contrast to the practice

obtaining in the SHG – Bank linkage programme, which takes about six to seven months for group formation and nurturing. As a result, cohesiveness and a sense of purpose were not being built up in the groups formed by these MFIs.

- Banks, as principal financiers of MFIs, do not appear to be engaging them with regard to their systems, practices and lending policies with a view to ensuring better transparency and adherence to best practices. many cases, no review of MFI operations were undertaken after sanctioning the credit facility.

== MFIs ==
Forbes magazine named seven microfinance institutes in India in the list of the world's top 50 microfinance institutions.

Bandhan, as well as two other Indian MFIs—Microcredit Foundation of India (ranked 13th) and Saadhana Microfin Society (15th) – have been placed above Bangladesh-based Grameen Bank (which along with its founder Mohammed Yunus, was awarded the Nobel Prize). Besides Bandhan, the Microcredit Foundation of India and Saadhana Microfin Society, other Indian entries include Grameen Koota (19th), Sharada's Women's Association for Weaker Section (23rd), SKS Microfinance Private Ltd (44th) and Asmitha Microfin Ltd (29th).

According to a report by CareEdge Ratings, the MFI sector will continue to grow at double-digit rates in 2024.

== Criticisms ==
Microfinance has come under fire in the state of Andhra Pradesh due to allegations of MFIs using coercive recollection practices and charging usurious interest rates. These charges resulted in the state government's passing of the Andhra Pradesh Microfinance Ordinance on 15 October 2010. The Ordinance requires MFIs to register with the state government and gives the state government the power, suo moto, to shut down MFI activity. A number of NBFCs have been affected by the ordinance, including sector heavyweight SKS Microfinance.
