= Jugal Kishore Birla =

Indian industrialist (1883–1967)

Jugal Kishore Birla (23 May 1883– 24 June 1967) was a scion of the Birla family and the eldest son of Baldeo Das Birla. He was a noted industrialist, philanthropist and vocal supporter of Hindu philosophy.

== Life ==
He started his business career at an early age, joining his father in Calcutta and soon came to be known as reputed trader and speculator in opium, silver, spice and other trades from which the Birlas later diversified into trading of jute and other items like cotton during and after the First World War, by which time his younger brother Ghanshyam Das Birla had also joined the business. The family firm, which was until 1918 run as Baldeodas Jugalkishore, was made into a limited company known as Birla Brothers Limited.

At one point, Ghanshyam Das Birla suffered heavy losses and decided to sell the mill to the Andrew Yule group. Jugal Kishore stood by him and told him not to worry about money but to run the mill as efficiently as he could, which led to a revival of Birla Jute, now the flagship company of M.P Birla Group.

Although Birla started his business life in Calcutta, he later moved to Delhi and lived in Birla House until his death. Lakshmi Niwas Birla, the eldest son of G D Birla, was adopted by him.

== Philanthropist ==
Having no children, Birla devoted much time and money to charity, building numerous temples, the Kolkata Medical College, Marwadi Balika Vidyalaya in Kolkata for girls and numerous other such institutions. A devout Hindu, he was also the moving force behind the building of many of the early Birla Mandirs across India, including the first in Delhi, and those in Kolkata and Bhopal. Supporting gaushalas (cow shelters) and pinjrapols (animal and bird feeding mangers) was another cause dear to his heart. He also donated money to various Hindu causes and organisations, including Hindu Mahasabha and Rashtriya Swayamsevak Sangh, at the same time supporting the finances of Mahatma Gandhi, the Indian National Congress and India's freedom movement, which were looked after together by Ghanshaymdas Birla and others.

In 1920, with his brother Ghanshaym Das, he donated funds to start a girls' school under their private trust called Marwari Balika Vidyalaya, which has now grown into the noted Shri Shikshayatan School and Shri Shikshayatan College.

He was a devoted follower of Gandhi and took a personal interest as well as donating funds for relief and charity works.

He spent much of his personal wealth in building Hindu temples known as Birla Temples and dharamshalas across the major metropolitan towns of India and the promotion of schools, universities and hospitals, and adopting many villages in times of famine and natural disasters.

In his old age, he took the leading role to fulfill the unfinished dream of Madan Mohan Malaviya of building Krishna Janmabhoomi Kesava Deo Temple. He donated a major sum and formed a private trust in 1951 to which the rights of land were later transferred, and temple works were inaugurated in 1965, for which he is remembered by Hindus. He also donated initial funds for the building of Vivekananda Rock Memorial and arranged for further funds for the project from his brothers, the construction of which, however, began several years after his death.

Birla died in 1967 and left his wealth to religious trusts and philanthropy and for his adopted son L N Birla.

=== Some noted philanthropic works ===
- Founded the trust in 1951, which built the famous Krishna Janmabhoomi Kesava Deo Temple at Mathura.
- North Delhi Hanuman Temple founded in 1965.
- Shri Laxmi Narayan Temple, Delhi founded in 1939.
- Birla Temple, Varanasi
- Birla Temple (Gita Temple), Mathura founded in 1946
- Shri Shikshayatan School which later grew into Shri Shikshayatan College of Kolkata was founded in 1920.
- Marwari Relief Society, Kolkata founded in 1913.
- Birla Hostel at Benaras Hindu University founded in 1920.
- Birla Temple, Kurukshetra founded in 1950.
- Dev Mandir, Bangkok - donated funds for marble slabs of the temple, which was inaugurated in 1969.
- Nipponzan Myohoji Temple, Mumbai – purchased land for building of this Buddhist temple.
- Lord Krishan Temple, Mathura built in 1946 in memory of his parents.
- Paramjyotir Mandir, Barobagh, Himachal Pradesh – donated huge amount of money on request of his friend Stokes, who founded the temple.
- Donated funds and arranged further monies from Birla group for building of the Vivekananda Rock Memorial
