= Rameshwar Das Birla =

Indian businessman

Rameshwar Das Birla (also Rameshwardas Birla) (1892–1973) was an Indian entrepreneur. He was second son of Baldeo Das Birla and the father of Madhav Prasad Birla and Gajanan Birla. He is known for founding hospitals & educational institutions in Mumbai, Kolkata and Pilani.

Birla's decision in 1922 to remarry following the death of his first wife caused a split in the Maheshwari caste of which his family were a member. They were outcast by the community, who doubted that his new wife was herself a Maheshwari and thus believed that Birla had broken the caste rules relating to marriage.

== See also ==
- Birla family

== Sources ==
- Bio on the web URL accessed on 1 April 2006
