= Subrata Maitra =

Subrata Maitra may refer to:

- Subrata Maitra (physician)
- Subrata Maitra (politician)
