= Baldeo Das Birla =

Indian industrialist and philanthropist

Raja B. D. Birla
- Born: 1863
- Died: 1956 (aged 92–93)
- Occupation: Industrialist Philanthropist
- Children: Jugal Kishore Birla; Rameshwar Das Birla; Ghanshyam Das Birla; Brij Mohan Birla
- Parent: Shiv Narain Birla

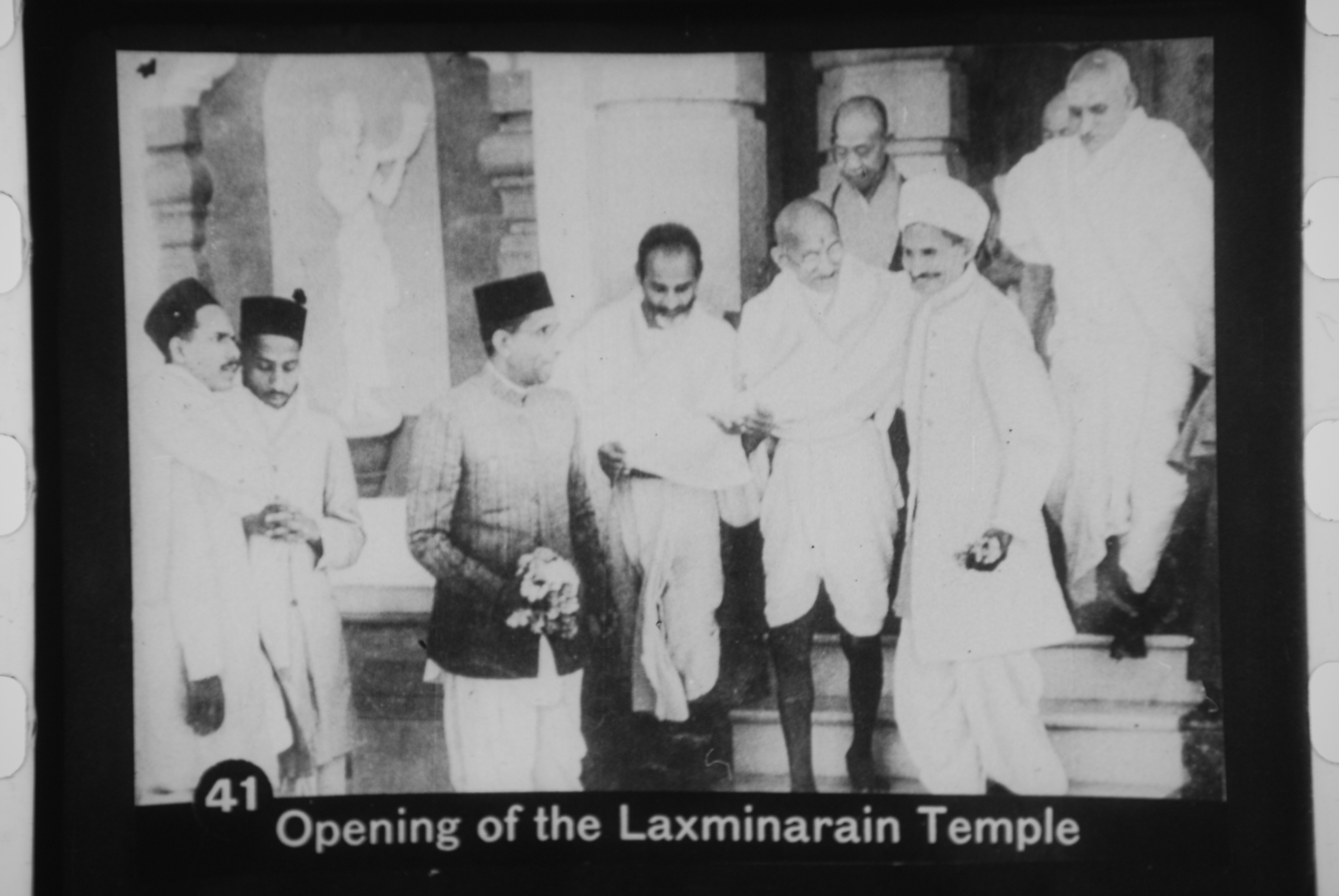
Mahatma Gandhi inaugurating the Laxminarayan Temple in Delhi, 1938, with the Birla family.

Baldeo Das Birla (1863–1956) was an Indian industrialist and philanthropist. He contributed to the establishment of the Medical College Calcutta, and also built the Laxminarayan Temple, Delhi, also known as Birla Mandir, which was inaugurated by Mahatma Gandhi in 1939.

== Business ==
When Britain was trading opium with China, Baldeo Das Birla, who was an adopted son of Shiv Narayan Birla used this opportunity to engage cargo ships in partnership with other tradesmen to trade opium with China. In 1887, Baldeo Das moved to Calcutta to set up business.

== Personal life ==
In the book by his great-grandson, Yash Birla mentioned that Baldeo Das Birla was named Raja by the British. The book further states that both Baldeo and his wife were both simple people who were deeply religious and superstitious.

Baladeo Birla and his wife had four sons: Jugal Kishore, Rameshwar Das, Ghanshyam Das Birla, and Brij Mohan Birla.

Baldeo Das was awarded the Raibahadur title in 1917. In 1920, he retired from business and started living in Banares pursuing religious studies. In 1925, he was awarded the title of "Raja" by the Maharaja of Dumraon. He was awarded D. Litt. by Banaras Hindu University.

== Writings by Baldeo Das Birla ==
- Chhandogyopnishada Rahasya, 1926
- Vedanta va Atmavichara, 1935
- Darshanik Vichara, 1950

== See also ==
- Birla family
- Birla Foundation
- Medical College and Hospital Building, Calcutta
