= Rajendra Singh Lodha =

Indian businessman

- Died: 3 October 2008; London, United Kingdom
- Occupations: Chartered Accountant & businessman Chairman of Birla Corporation
- Known for: Chairman of Birla Corporation
- Spouse: Manorama Devi
- Children: 3

Rajendra Singh Lodha (died 3 October 2008), popularly known as R. S. Lodha, was an Indian chartered accountant and the chairman of the Birla Corporation. He managed several group companies, including Birla Corporation, Universal Cables, Vindhya Telelinks and Birla Ericsson Optical. He was a chartered accountant by profession and the owner of the audit firm Lodha & Co.

== Career ==
Lodha became co-chairman of the Birla Corporation in 2001. In July 2004, Priyamvada Birla, chairperson of the Birla Corporation, died and was revealed to have bequeathed the entire assets of the company to Lodha in 1999. Lodha was also the will's executor. This sparked a protracted legal battle between members of the Birla family and Lodha that included more than 110 court cases at one time. Despite this, Lodha took charge as chairman of the corporation.

He also served as an independent director on the board of the State Bank of India (SBI), the largest bank in India. He was a member of the executive committee of SBI for six years from 1995 to 2001.

Lodha held positions on the boards of National Securities Depository Limited (NSDL), Indian Petrochemicals Corporation, SBI Life Insurance Company and Henkel India. Simultaneously, he served as the trustee of Bharatiya Vidya Bhavan in the UK and as a Life Trustee of Bombay Hospital. Lodha was the first chairman of the South Asia Business Forum, sponsored by the Asian Development Bank.

He contributed to the Prime Minister's Council on Trade & Industry, the Board of Trade, and the Central Direct Taxes Advisory Committee. He also served as the governor of the Indian Institute of Social Welfare and Business Management.

== Death ==
Lodha died in London of a heart attack on 3 October 2008. He had two sons and a daughter. The legal battle over the Birla estate continued after his death.
