= Sucharit =

Sucharit is a given name. Notable people with the name include:

- Sucharit Bhakdi (born 1946), Thai-German microbiologist
- Sucharit Sarkar (born 1983), Indian topologist and associate professor of mathematics
- Sucharit Suda (1895–1982), Thai consort
