= Shri Shikshayatan School =

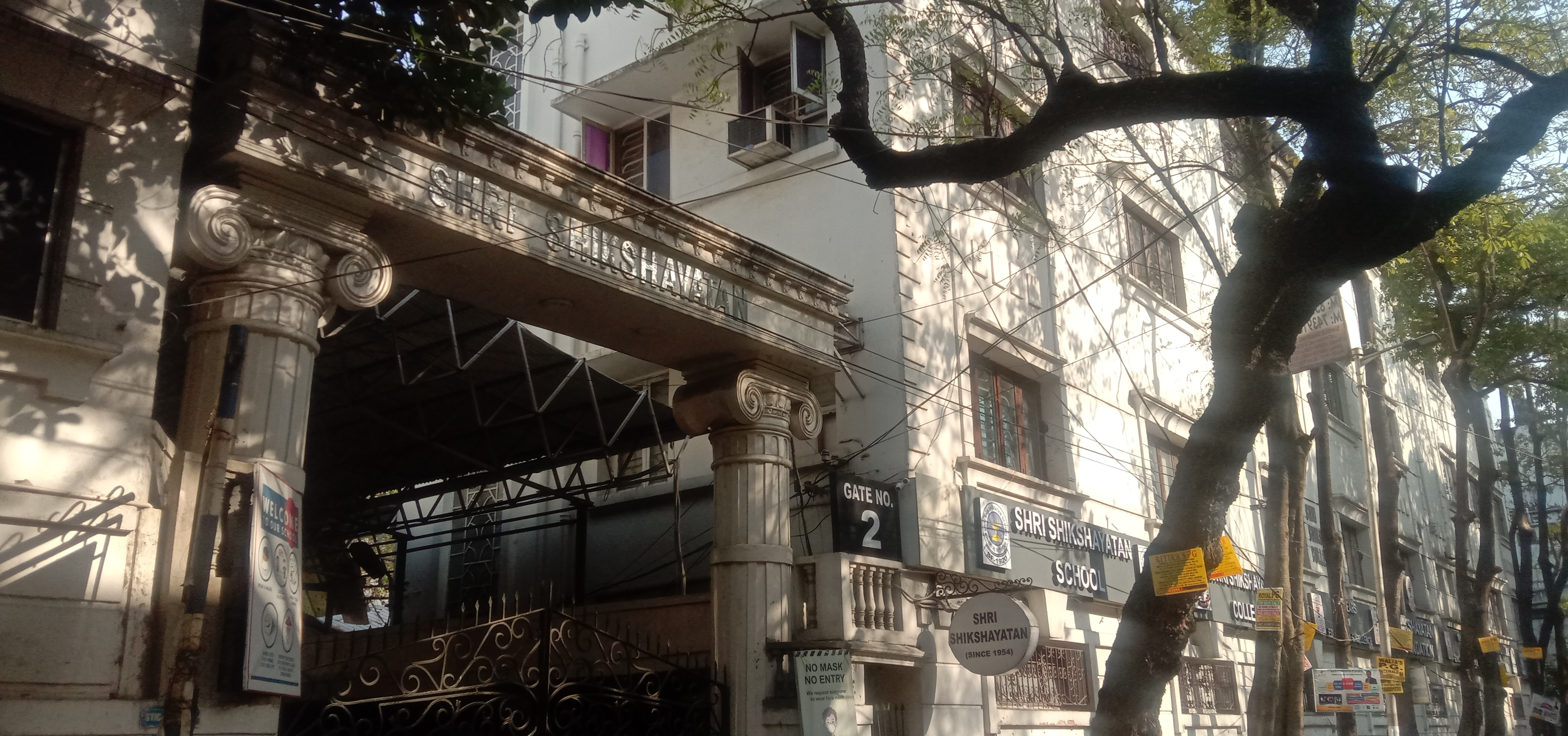
- Shri Shikshayatan School entrance

Location
- 11, Lord Sinha Road, Elgin, Kolkata, West Bengal, 700071; India; 22.5433918°N 88.3486064°E

Information
- Established: 1920
- School board: Central Board of Secondary Education
- Language: English
- Campus type: Urban
- Website: https://www.shrishikshayatanschool.com/

Shri Shikshayatan School is an all girls school in Kolkata, West Bengal, India. It is affiliated to Central Board of Secondary Education. Shri Shikshayatan school offers education from pre-nursery up to class 12. The school has won the British Council International School Award numerous times and was declared as The Telegraph's School of The Year in 2018. The school branches out into The Shri Shikshayatan College, a NAAC A grade college affiliated to the University of Calcutta. The school was declared "India's Most Dynamic School" by the jury of Education Today in 2022.

== History ==
The school had its origin as Marwari Ballika Vidyalaya, started from donations and leadership of Jugal Kishore Birla and Ghanshyam Das Birla and Sitaram Seksaria way back in 1920. At that time it was located in Burra Bazar area of old Calcutta.

In 1954, it shifted to its current located at 11, Lord Sinha Road, Kolkata 700071 and was rechristened as Shri Shikshayatan School.

The school has now grown into women's college, Shri Shikshayatan College, which was founded in 1955. Shri Shikshayatan School was established, and is now administered and managed by the members of the linguistic minority through its parent body Shikshayatan foundation.

== See also ==
- Education in India
- List of schools in India
- Education in West Bengal
