= Gauri Ayyub =

Indian social worker, activist, writer (1931–1998)

- Born: February 13, 1931; Patna, Bihar and Orissa Province, British India
- Died: July 13, 1998 (aged 67); Kolkata, West Bengal, India
- Education: Bankipur Girls' High School; Magadh Mahila College
- Occupations: Social worker, activist, writer and teacher
- Spouse: Abu Sayeed Ayyub
- Writing career
- Language: Bengali
- Subjects: Social and political issues
- Notable works: Tuchcha Kichu Sukh Dukkha, Door Prodesher Sankirno Path, Ei je Ahana

Gauri Ayyub (13 February 1931 – 13 July 1998) was a social worker, activist, writer and teacher based in Kolkata (Calcutta) for most of her life. Married to the philosopher and literary critic, Abu Sayeed Ayyub (1906–1982), Gauri was a writer in her own right, and is known for her short stories, translations, and numerous articles on social issues. She is recognised for her role in the propagation of communal harmony in Bengal, active assistance to the Bangladesh Liberation War of 1971 and vocal opposition to the curbing of human rights during the declaration of emergency in India in 1974. She assisted writer and social worker Maitreyi Devi in founding Khelaghar, initially as a shelter for Bangladeshi children orphaned during the war of 1971. After Maitreyi Devi died in 1990, Ayyub took charge of Khelaghar

Gauri Ayyub studied philosophy at Visva-Bharati University, Santiniketan and education at the University of Calcutta. During 1963–91, she was a professor and later the head of the department of education at the Shri Shikshayatan College, an affiliated college of the University of Calcutta.

== Biography ==
=== Early life ===
Gauri Datta was born on 13 February 1931 at Patna. Her father, professor Dhirendra Mohan Datta, was a philosopher, writer and teacher. Her mother, Nirupama Datta, ran her business. Gauri had four brothers and four sisters. Her family had roots in the former East Pakistan and the occasional arduous journey from Patna to Mymensingh (now in Bangladesh) formed an important part of her early memories. Her Gandhian father encouraged a frugal lifestyle that strongly influenced her adult life and thoughts.

=== Education ===
Gauri went to Bankipur Girls' High School and stood first among girls in the statewide final examination in 1947. After two years of intermediate education at Magadh Mahila College, she enrolled at Patna University. While here, she was arrested for her involvement in an anti-imperialist student movement. The couple of nights that she spent in jail shaped her future life, since her father promptly packed her off in 1950 to Visva Bharati University. There, she completed her B.A. in philosophy (1952) without political distractions.

During this period, she met and soon fell in love with Abu Sayeed Ayyub, her teacher and 25 years her senior. She earned a teachers' training degree in 1953 and completed her M.A. in education from the University of Calcutta in 1955. During her stay in Shantiniketan, she organised a literary festival along with Nemai Chattopadhyay that, in hindsight, is of great significance. This three-day festival starting on 21 February 1953, brought together Bengali writers and poets of Bangladesh (then East Pakistan) and West Bengal. Most significantly, it commemorated the shooting down of several Bengali students, exactly a year back in Dhaka, who had protested against the imposition of Urdu as the national language of Pakistan. Though not widely recognised, this was the first public commemoration of the Bhasha Andolan (Bengali language movement), later institutionalised as the International Mother Language Day by UNESCO, and widely celebrated in both Bangladesh and West Bengal as "Bhasha Dibas".

=== Professional life ===
After short stints of teaching at Ushagram Methodist Mission (1953), South Point School (1955–57) and Jodhpur Park Girls' High School, she joined the Shri Shikshayatan College in 1963 and headed the department of education till a year before her retirement in 1991.

Gauri Ayyub died in her home in Kolkata (13 July 1998) at 67

== Other activities ==
=== Educator ===
She wrote on educational issues and taught Bengali to several foreign students and scholars. Among the Japanese students she interacted with were Masayuki Usuda, Nariaki Nakazato and Kyoko Niwa, who later went on to achieve recognition as scholars on India and Bengal. She developed a distinctive teaching style, throwing her students in at the deep end, usually by starting with a Rabindranath Tagore novel. Her interest in Tagore studies was manifested by her involvement with the Tagore Research Institute in Kolkata and in several of her articles (see below).

=== Social worker ===
Her entry into active social work was triggered by the riot between Hindus and Muslims that ravaged Kolkata in 1964. Under the leadership of Maitreyi Devi, she and several other intellectuals and social workers of the time, founded the Council for Promotion of Communal Harmony. The activities of the CPCH were not limited to intellectual discussions, but involved camps and often risky visits to troubled areas and encounters with the active fundamentalist elements from both communities.

Gauri Ayyub played an active role in aid of the Bangladesh freedom movement of 1971, providing moral and social support for many displaced people, and actively arranging for aid, shelter and healthcare for refugees. One of her most significant contributions was in co-founding "Khelaghar", a shelter for Bangladeshi children orphaned during the atrocities. In 2012, the Government of Bangladesh honoured her (posthumously) with the Friends of Liberations War Honour in recognition of her many contributions.

=== Social activist ===
She continued to get involved in a series of sociopolitical issues. She was particularly perturbed by the imposition of emergency during 1975–77, and the consequent curtailment of civil liberties. During this period, she kept risking arrest and imprisonment by attending rallies to raise the collective social conscience and holding closed door meetings (often at her own home) with prominent leaders such as Jayaprakash Narayan and social activists such as Gour Kishore Ghosh, who both spent much of this period behind bars.

=== Writer ===
The relatively few short stories that she wrote in Bengali were marked not only for their perceptiveness, but "unostentatious beauty". She collaborated with her husband in producing two books of translations of the Urdu poets, Ghalib and Meer. She took formal lessons in Urdu for this purpose. She also collaborated with her former student, Kyoko Niwa, to translate a travelogue by the famed 17th century Japanese poet, Matsuo Bashō, into Bengali. Not reflected in her own bibliography, however, is her very significant contribution to the transcription and production of much of Abu Sayeed Ayyub's literary output, a substantial part of which came after he was physically incapacitated by Parkinson's disease.

=== Grandmother ===
Her deep affection and interest in her only grandchild, Shreya Ahana, resulted in a small book of memories, n Ahana-ke Niye

== Literary works ==
=== Books ===
- Tuchcha Kichu Sukh Dukkha (Dey's Publishing, 1986): Collection of short stories in Bengali. ASIN B07Z4MPLHV
- Door Prodesher Sankirno Path (Dey's Publishing, 1990): Bengali Translation of a Japanese Travelogue (with Kyoko Niwa).
- Ei je Ahana (Papyrus,1996): Stories of her granddaughter (in Bengali).
- Ahana-ke niye (Gangchil, 2015): Stories about and correspondence with her granddaughter: Ahana (in Bengali), ISBN 978-93-84002-33-6.
- Amader Dujoner Katha: Ebong Anyanya (Dey's Publishing, 2013): Autobiography and Collected Works (in Bengali and English), ISBN 978-81-295-2168-2.

=== Selected articles ===
- Kabilnamah thekey Basudhara: Asampurna Parichoyer sutrey (An Incomplete Understanding), Chaturanga September 1984, pp 412–422
- Hindu-Musalman Birodh: Rabindranather Chokhey (The Hindu-Muslim Conflict: Tagore's Perspective), Chaturanga January 1988, pp 777–790
- Rabindrik Shikshay Mukti O Srinkhala (Freedom and Discipline in Tagore's Teachings), Rabindra Bhavna Vol. 18, No. 1 (1994) pp 1–27
- Khandita Pratima (Dissected Idols), Desh 14 August 1997, pp 28–32
