= M.P Birla Group =

Indian industrial conglomerate

- Company type: Public
- Industry: Conglomerate
- Founder: Madhav Prasad Birla
- Headquarters: Kolkata, West Bengal, India
- Products: Jute; textiles; wire cable; optical fibre; cement; automotive; chemical

The M.P Birla Group is an Indian industrial group named after Madhav Prasad Birla. It has business interests in cement, cables, jute goods and guar gum.

== Operations ==
It has a registered office in Kolkata and regional offices in Mumbai and New Delhi, among other places. In addition to Kolkata, Birlapur and Durgapur, the group has plants located in Rewa, Maihar, Satna, Raebareli City, Kundanganj (Raebareli), Chanderia (Chittorgarh), Jodhpur, Viramgam, Bhiwani, Butibori and Goa.

=== Businesses ===
- Birla Corporation is the flagship company of the group.
- Belle Vue Clinic, Kolkata
- Universal Cables
  - Birla Cables Ltd
  - Vindhya Telelinks
  - Birla Furukawa Fibre Optics Pvt Ltd (JV of Universal Cables Limited and Furukawa Electric)

== Philanthropy ==
The M. P. Birla Group is known for its philanthropic and educational activities, and supports many hospitals, schools, and technical and management institutions.

Some of the educational institutions and hospitals run by the group include:

- M. P. Birla Planetarium, Kolkata
- M. P. Birla Institute of Management, Bengaluru
- M. P. Birla Foundation Higher Secondary School, Kolkata

Notable trusts and societies under M.P. Birla Group are Hindustan Medical Institution, Eastern India Educational Institution, and South Point Foundation.
