= Sukanta Chaudhuri =

Indian academic

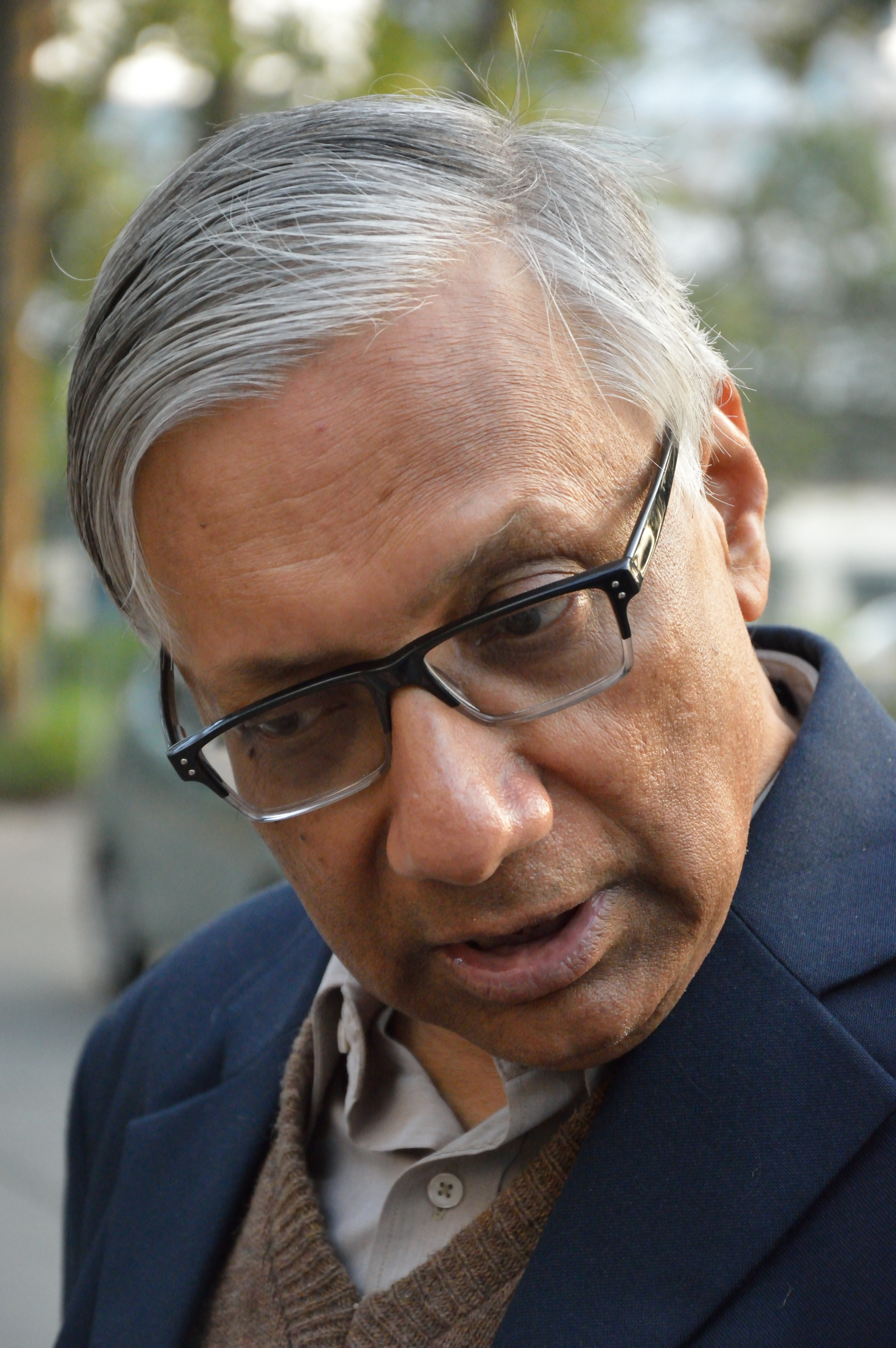
Sukanta Chaudhuri. January 2015.

Sukanta Chaudhuri (born 1950) is an Indian literary scholar, now Professor Emeritus at Jadavpur University, Kolkata. He was educated at Presidency College, Kolkata and the University of Oxford. He taught at Presidency College from January 1973 to December 1991 and at Jadavpur University thereafter till his retirement in June 2010. At Jadavpur, he was founding Director of the School of Cultural Texts and Records, a pioneering centre of digital humanities in India. His chief fields of study are the English and European Renaissance, translation, textual studies and digital humanities. He has held visiting appointments at many places including All Souls College, Oxford; St John's College, Cambridge; the School of Advanced Study, London; University of Alberta, University of Virginia; and Loyola University, Chicago. He is an Honorary Fellow of the Asiatic Society, Kolkata and a member of the Executive Committee of the International Shakespeare Association. In July 2021, he was elected a Corresponding Fellow of the British Academy.

== Renaissance scholarship ==
His first major monograph Infirm Glory: Shakespeare and the Renaissance Image of Man (Oxford, 1981) was followed by Renaissance Pastoral and Its English Developments (Oxford, 1989). More recently, he has edited Pastoral Poetry of the English Renaissance (2 vols, Manchester, 2016–17) and the Third Arden edition of Shakespeare's A Midsummer Night's Dream (2017). He has also edited selections of Francis Bacon's Essays and of Elizabethan poetry for Oxford University Press, and edited or co-edited several collections of essays on the Renaissance. He has studied the links and parallels between the European and the Bengal Renaissances, and the possibility of a common model of a 'Renaissance'.

== Translation ==
Chaudhuri has translated extensively from Rabindranath Tagore, Bankim Chandra Chattopadhyay, Sarat Chandra Chattopadhyay, Sukumar Ray, Rajshekhar Bose and other classic Bengali writers, and many modern Bengali poets. His Select Nonsense of Sukumar Ray (New Delhi: OUP, 1998) is an acclaimed recreation in English of Sukumar Ray's whimsical nonsense poems. He was General Editor of the Oxford Tagore Translations (five volumes between 2000 and 2006). He has also translated the complete limericks of Edward Lear into Bengali, and selections from the Notebooks of Leonardo da Vinci from Italian into Bengali. He is the author of Translation and Understanding (New Delhi: OUP, 1999).

== Textual studies and digital humanities ==
For many years now, he has worked extensively on textual studies and editorial theory. His book The Metaphysics of Text combines the insights of traditional bibliography and textual criticism with recent editorial theory and theories of language. Besides his editions of Shakespeare and Early Modern texts cited above, his textual inquiries have led him to the field of digital humanities, as centred in the School of Cultural Texts and Records at Jadavpur University. His work covers digital archiving, database creation and computational analysis of texts. He was Principal Investigator of two major projects under the British Library's Endangered Archives Programme. Most importantly, he was chief co-ordinator of Bichitra, the comprehensive online variorum of the works of Rabindranath Tagore.

== Urban studies ==
Chaudhuri is interested in urban studies. He edited the authoritative two-volume reference work Calcutta: The Living City (OUP Delhi, 1990). For many years, he wrote a fortnightly column "View from Calcutta" for the newspaper The Asian Age. He writes and campaigns extensively on urban issues, especially as concerning his native city, Kolkata.

== Drama ==
Chaudhuri's Bengali play Jaha Chai ('What We Desire') was performed in 2007 by the theatre group Nandikar. It was part of a worldwide project on "cultural mobility", built around the idea of Shakespeare's lost play Cardenio and co-ordinated by the scholar Stephen Greenblatt and the Off-Broadway dramatist Charles L. Mee. Chaudhuri set the story in modern Bengal, the lost play metamorphosing into a (fictional) hitherto unknown Tagore text.

He is married to Supriya Chaudhuri, who also taught at the Department of English, Jadavpur University.
