= Subrata Maitra (physician) =

Bengali medical doctor

Subrata Maitra (8 September 1956 – 17 March 2016) was a doctor known for treating several high-profile patients including Bengali actress Suchitra Sen, the Chief Minister of West Bengal, Mamata Banerjee, Ramakrishna Mission president Swami Ranganathananda.

== Early life ==
Maitra was born in Kolkata to Shri Kashi Kanta Maitra and Smt. Reba Maitra. He attended Jagabandhu Institution, Ballygunge for his schooling years and went to Calcutta National Medical College to complete his MBBS studies, following which he obtained a postgraduate degree (DNB) from New Delhi. At the age of 26, he left home and went to the United Kingdom to complete his MRCP qualification. After working in the UK as a Junior doctor in various fields including critical care for nearly 8 years, he came back home and joined the Woodlands Hospital in Kolkata.

== Career ==
Maitra spent nearly five years trying to improve the ailing state-run health care system in West Bengal. He used to helm the expert committee on health formed by the chief minister.

Maitra helped set up a hospital - Ranganathananda Gramin Swastha Seva Kendra - in Sandeshkhali block of the Sundarbans. A disciple of the Belur Math, he had distributed medicines, food and water to Sunderbans villagers after Cyclone Aila ravaged the islands in May 2009.

In 2015, Maitra was awarded "Banga Bhushan" award by the West Bengal government for his contribution to the state's healthcare.

== Death ==
Maitra was diagnosed with brain tumour in December 2014. On 14 March 2016, he was shifted to Belle Vue Clinic, Kolkata. He subsequently died on 17 March 2016 following multi-organ failure.

== Personal life ==
Maitra was married to Chaitali Mukherjee, a guest Lecturer in English at St. Paul's Mission College and had two sons.
