= Sumit Ranjan Das =

Indian physicist and professor

- Born: 11 December 1955 (age 70); Calcutta, West Bengal, India
- Education: South Point School; Presidency College; Rajabazar Science College (University of Calcutta); University of Chicago; Fermilab; California Institute of Technology
- Known for: Studies on string theory
- Awards: 1998 Shanti Swarup Bhatnagar Prize
- Scientific career
- Fields: High energy physics
- Workplaces: Tata Institute of Fundamental Research; University of Kentucky College of Arts and Sciences

Sumit Ranjan Das (born 11 December 1955) is a US-based Indian high energy physicist and a professor at the University of Kentucky. Known for his research on string theory, Das is an elected fellow of the Indian Academy of Sciences. The Council of Scientific and Industrial Research, the apex agency of the Government of India for scientific research, awarded him the Shanti Swarup Bhatnagar Prize for Science and Technology, one of the highest Indian science awards, for his contributions to physical sciences in 1998. (Note: Long link - please select award year to see details)

== Biography ==
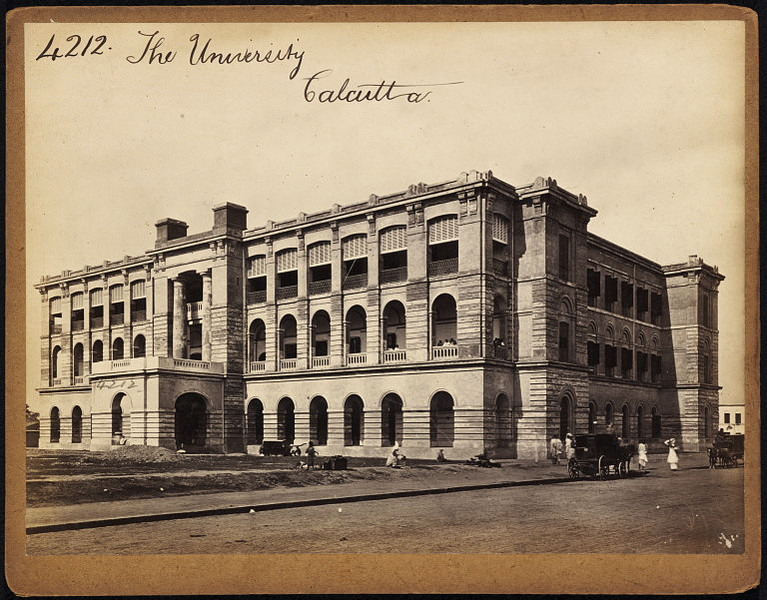
Calcutta University- a Francis Frith photo

Born on 11 December 1955 at Kolkata in the Indian state of West Bengal, Sumit Ranjan Das did his early schooling at South Point School and earned his graduate degree from Presidency College and master's degree from the Science College, University of Calcutta. Moving to the US, he enrolled at the University of Chicago for his doctoral studies and after securing a PhD in 1983, he did his post-doctoral studies at Fermilab (1983–85) and California Institute of Technology (1985–87). On his return to India in 1987, he joined Tata Institute of Fundamental Research where he served as a member of faculty till 2001. Subsequently, he went back to the US and joined the Department of Physics and Astronomy, University of Kentucky College of Arts and Sciences where he holds the position of Jack and Linda Gill Professor. He was a senior associate at Kavli Institute for the Physics and Mathematics of the Universe during 2009–10 and a visiting professor at Yukawa Institute for Theoretical Physics, Kyoto University during 2014 and has held visiting positions at several universities in the US.

== Legacy ==
The principal focus of Das' research is string theory and quantum field theory. His work on two dimensional strings is the earliest example of holographic principle. His work on black holes in string theory assisted in resolving the information paradox with regard to black holes.

== Awards and honors ==
Das was a gold medalist in both his graduate and master's examinations. The Council of Scientific and Industrial Research awarded him the Shanti Swarup Bhatnagar Prize, one of the highest Indian science awards in 1998. The Indian Academy of Sciences elected him as a fellow the same year.

== Selected bibliography ==
- Sumit R. Das; Antal Jevicki (1990). "String Field Theory and Physical Interpretation of D=1 String". Modern Physics Letters A. 5 (28): 1639–1650. Bibcode:2005MPLA...20.2101D. doi:10.1142/S0217732390001888.
- Sumit R.Das; Samir D. Mathur (1996). "Comparing decay rates for black holes and D-branes". Nuclear Physics B. B478 (3): 561–576. arXiv:hep-th/9606185. Bibcode:1996NuPhB.478..561D. doi:10.1016/0550-3213(96)00453-1. S2CID 17202127.
- Sumit Das (2007). "Holography and cosmological singularities". International Journal of Modern Physics A. 22 (31): 5638–5655. arXiv:0706.4188. Bibcode:2007IJMPA..22.5638D. doi:10.1142/S0217751X0703889X. S2CID 11274511.
- Adel Awad; Sumit Das; K. Narayan; Sandip Trivedi (2008). "Gauge theory duals of cosmological backgrounds and their energy momentum tensors". Physical Review D. 77 (4) 046008. arXiv:0711.2994. Bibcode:2008PhRvD..77d6008A. doi:10.1103/PhysRevD.77.046008. S2CID 2458385.
- Sumit Das; Gautam Mandal (2009). "Microstate dependence of scattering from the D1-D5 system". Journal of High Energy Physics. 2009 (4): 036. arXiv:0812.1358. Bibcode:2009JHEP...04..036D. doi:10.1088/1126-6708/2009/04/036. S2CID 15928271.

== See also ==
- Black hole
- Hawking radiation
