= Belle Vue Clinic, Kolkata =

Belle Vue Clinic বেল ভিউ ক্লিনিক

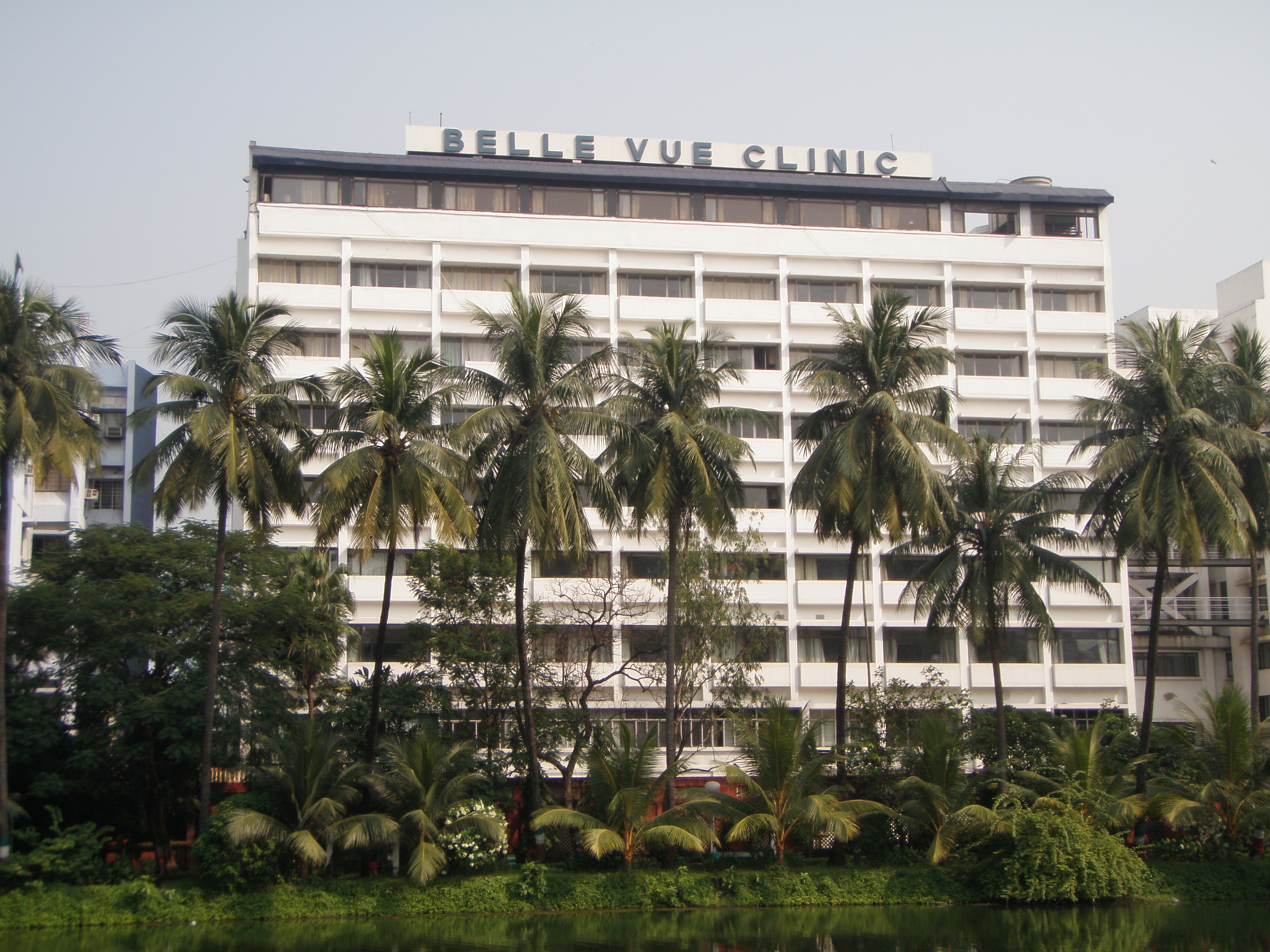

Geography
- Location: Dr. U. N. Brahmachari Street (Formerly Loudon Street), Elgin, Kolkata, Kolkata, West Bengal, India
- Coordinates: 22°32′33.0907″N 88°21′17.4802″E

Organisation
- Care system: Private hospital
- Type: General
- Patron: M.P Birla Group

Services
- Standards: NABH
- Emergency department: Yes

Links
- Website: www.bellevueclinic.com
- Lists: Hospitals in India

Belle Vue Clinic is a NABH accredited for-profit private hospital chain that is one of the earliest hospitals established in Kolkata. The hospital is a part of the M.P Birla Group that owns and runs a large number of businesses and enterprises in the city. Priyamvada Devi Birla, wife of the late Madhav Prasad Birla, is the founder of this hospital. Belle Vue Clinic had the first ICCU in the private sector in 1971 and was the first centre to start renal transplants. It also became the first centre in eastern India to conduct tissue typing for Organ Transplant patients.

== Overview ==
Belle Vue is centrally located in Kolkata. It is one of the larger multi-specialty hospitals in the city having a 241-bed capacity. The hospital opened in 1967 and was one of the earliest to be established in Kolkata and the greater eastern region of the country. Many distinguished personalities from West Bengal, from artists to politicians have, at various times, been admitted to Belle Vue for treatment. Some of them include the 14th Speaker of the Lok Sabha and a former Member of parliament, and Somnath Chatterjee who died at 89 from cardiac arrest while undergoing treatment at the hospital. Ex Chief minister of West Bengal Buddhadeb Bhattacharya, Mahanayak Uttam Kumar, Mahanayika Suchitra Sen, famous actor Saumitra Chetterjee, Oscar winner Satyajit Ray was also admitted to this Hospital. Noted Bengali fiction writer and socio-political activist Mahasweta Devi was also admitted to Belle Vue with a urinary tract ailment.

Belle Vue Clinic will set up two hospitals at Rajarhat a 164-bed general hospital and a 400-bed multispecialty facility.

== Award & accreditations ==
- Belle Vue was acclaimed by The Week, an independent weekly amongst India's Best Hospitals, for three consecutive years, from 2011 to 2013.
- The hospital achieved NABL Accreditation for its Pathology Department in January 2011.

== Departments ==
The hospital has the following departments:

- Cardiology
- CCU & ICCU & ICU, KTU, NICK
- Radiology & Imaging
- Cardiac Surgery
- Operation Theaters
- Neurology
- Cardiology Surgical in ICU
- Neurotology (Vertigo Care)
- Blood Bank
- Urology
- OPD
- Gastroenterology
- Pathology
- Emergency Department
- Oncology & Onco Surgery
- Nephrology & Kidney Transplant
- Physiotherapy
- Gynaecology & Obstetrics
- Pharmacy
- Orthopaedics & Spine Surgery
- Composite Health Plans
- General Medicine
- General Laparoscopic
- Bariatric & GI Surgery
- Diabetology & Endocrinology
- Pulmonology
- Rheumatology
- ENT & Endoscopic Surgery
- Sleep Apnea
- Mother & Child Care
- Digital X-Ray (Digital X-ray, CT Scan, MRI, Mammography, B.M.D., USG & Echocardiography)

== Controversies ==
On 20 December 2018, a Kolkata metropolitan magistrate issued an arrest warrant against Pradip Tondon, the CEO of Belle Vue hospital. The warrant was issued as a result of the wife of a patient- who had died while undergoing treatment in Belle Vue Clinic- moving the West Bengal Medical Council against four doctors besides lodging a criminal case against those four doctors and also the hospital CEO. She alleged that her husband Sanjay Poddar, 51, had died on 7 September 2016, owing to medical negligence on part of the hospital.

== See also ==
- AMRI Hospitals
