= Satikanta Guha =

Indian educator

- Born: 1 June 1910; Sunamganj, Sylhet district, British India
- Died: 8 January 1991 (aged 80); Calcutta, West Bengal, India
- Occupation: Educator

Satikanta Guha was an Indian educator who founded the South Point School.

== Early life ==
Guha was born on 1 June 1910, in Sunamganj, Sylhet district, British India, now Bangladesh. He started his schooling first at Dhaka Collegiate School and later at Hare School in Calcutta. He graduated from Presidency College Calcutta. Later, he stood first in the LLB examination of the University of Calcutta. From childhood, he was drawn to literature. From the age of 15, he started editing children's journals called Benu and Chitra. He also edited the magazine Rangmashal.

== Career ==
He founded various publishing houses. He published books including Abanindranath Thakur's Rajkahini, Dakshinaranjan Mitra Majumder's First Boy and Last Boy and also Shibram Chakraborty's Baadi Thekey Paliye.

He founded the South Point School in 1954, located in the Ballygunge area of Calcutta. His son, Indranath Guha, and his wife, Prity Lata Guha, who were members of the Trust established by Satikanta Guha — The South Point Education Society — continued to play important roles in the management of the school after his death. Prity Lata Guha was the Secretary, while Indranath Guha was the Principal of South Point School. Indranath Guha was the Principal-Secretary of South Point High School till he resigned from all his posts in South Point School and High School on 3 May 1995. After the accused murder, of Indranath's wife, Surupa, in 1976, Satikanta, Prity Lata, Indranath, Ramendranath Lahiri, and Jhantu Charan Dutt were accused of murder. No charge was framed against Ramendranath by the Sessions Judge, and all charges against Satikanta and Prity Lata were quashed by the Honorable High Court of Calcutta.

Satikanta Guha had received numerous awards for literature, such as the Mouchak Award for children's literature, and the Rabindra Puraskar for his novel Natyakar. His son, Indranath Guha, is the current Founder-Rector of Garden High School, Garden High International School and Garden High School IISER Kolkata Campus, Mohanpur. Satikanta Guha died on 8 January 1991, aged 80.
