= Supriya Chaudhuri =

Indian scholar of English literature

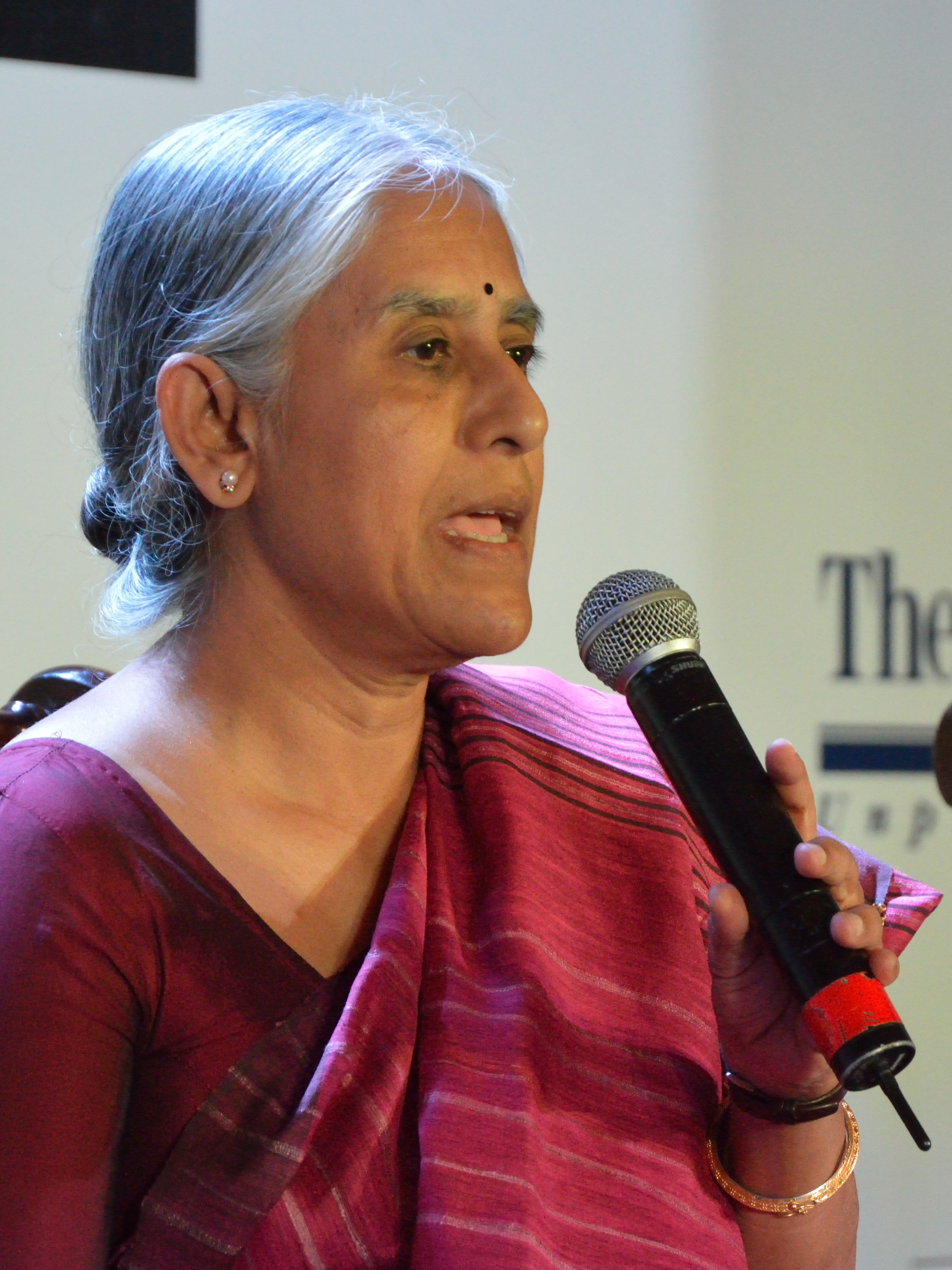
- Born: 1953 (age 72–73)
- Citizenship: Indian
- Education: Presidency College, University of Calcutta (B.A.); St Hilda's College, University of Oxford (B.A.); University of Oxford (M.A., D.Phil.)
- Occupations: Professor of English (Emerita), Jadavpur University
- Years active: 1975-present

Supriya Chaudhuri (Bengali: সুপ্রিয়া চৌধুরী; born 1953) is an Indian scholar of English literature. She is Professor Emerita at Kolkata's Jadavpur University.

== Biography ==
Chaudhuri was born in Delhi, India, and grew up in India. She was educated at South Point High School, Presidency College in Calcutta, and the University of Oxford, where she was a State Scholar from 1973 to 1975, taking a First in English.

After serving a few years at Presidency as Assistant Professor of English, she returned to Oxford on an Inlaks Scholarship (1978–81) for doctoral research in Renaissance Studies. She was awarded a D.Phil. in 1981. She joined the faculty of Jadavpur University after having taught at Presidency College and Calcutta University. She was in charge of the UGC funded research programme of the university's English Department. Her scholarship ranges over many fields, notably literary theory, 18th-century British literature, modernism, and the Renaissance.

== Selected works ==
=== As editor ===
- (with Sukanta Chaudhuri) Writing Over: Medieval to Renaissance.
- (with Sajni Mukherji) Literature and Gender: Essays for Jasodhara Bagchi, Orient Longman, 2002.
- Literature and Philosophy: Essays in Connexion, Papyrus, 2006.
- Chaudhuri, Supriya; Chaudhuri, Sukanta, eds. (2012). Petrarch: The Self and the World. Jadavpur University Press. ISBN 9788186954911.
- Tadié, Alexis; Mangan, J.A.; Chaudhuri, Supriya, eds. (2016). Sport, Literature, Society: Cultural Historical Studies. Routledge. ISBN 9781134920242.
- Chaudhuri, Supriya; McDonagh, Josephine; Murray, Brian H.; Rajan, Rajeswari Sunder, eds. (2017). Commodities and Culture in the Colonial World. Routledge. ISBN 9781351620000.

=== As contributor ===
- Supriya Chaudhuri (2012). ""What bloody man is that?" Macbeth, Maqbool, and Shakespeare in India". In Chaudhuri, Sukanta (ed.). The Shakespearean International Yearbook. Surrey: Ashgate.
- Supriya Chaudhuri (2019). "Eyes Wide Shut: Seeing and Knowing in Othello". In Mukherji, Subha (ed.). Blind Spots of Knowledge in Shakespeare and His World: A Conversation. Walter de Gruyter GmbH & Co KG. ISBN 9783110661996.
- Supriya Chaudhuri (2019). "9 Modernist Literary Communities in 1930s Calcutta: The Politics of Parichay". In Pollentier, Caroline; Wilson, Sarah (eds.). Modernist Communities across Cultures and Media. University Press of Florida.
- Supriya Chaudhuri (2020). "Imagined Worlds: The Prose Fiction of Rabindranath Tagore". In Chaudhuri, Sukanta (ed.). The Cambridge Companion to Rabindranath Tagore. Cambridge University Press.
- Supriya Chaudhuri (2020). "Desiring Bengal: Trade, Culture, and the First English Traveller to Eastern India". In Goswami, Niranjan (ed.). Desiring India: Representations through British and French Eyes 1584-1857. Jadavpur University Press.
- Supriya Chaudhuri (2021). "Global Shakespeare and the question of a world literature". In Trivedi, Poonam; Chakravarti, Paromita; Motohashi, Ted (eds.). Asian interventions in global Shakespeare: 'All the world's his stage'. New York: Routledge.

=== As translator ===
- Rabindranath Tagore, Relationships (Jogajog), translated by Supriya Chaudhuri, The Oxford Tagore Translation
