= Birla Foundation =

Birla Foundation may refer to:

- K. K. Birla Foundation, established in 1991 by Krishna Kumar Birla with mission to promote literature (especially Hindi literature) and the arts, as well as education and social work
- M. P. Birla Foundation, founded by Madhav Prasadji Birla, established the M. P. Birla Foundation Higher Secondary School in Kolkata in 1988

== See also ==
- Birla family
