= Bharatiya Bhasha Parishad =

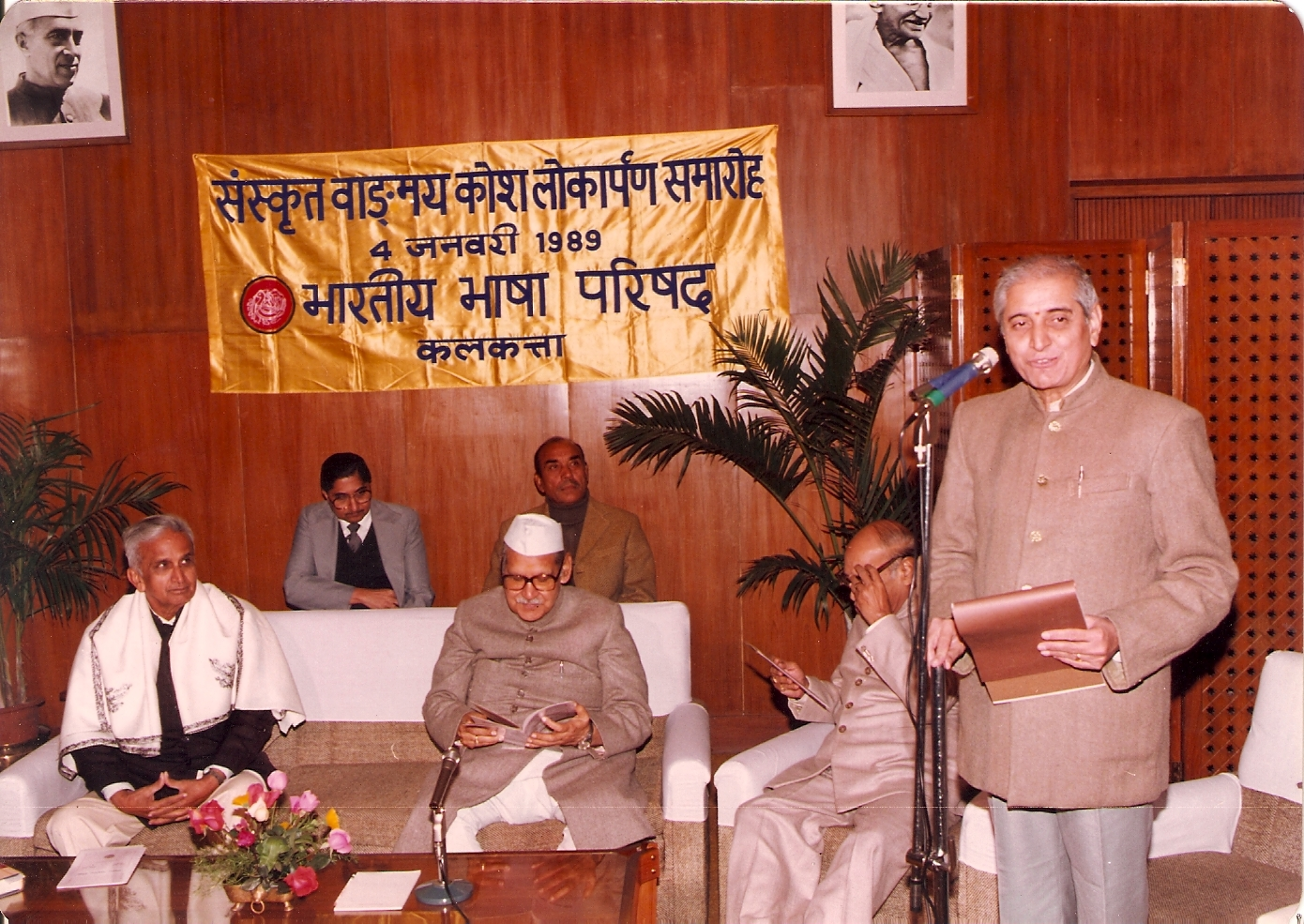
- Bharatiya Bhasa Parishad, kolkata with then President of India, 1989
- Formation: 1975
- Purpose: Literary
- Headquarters: Shakespeare Sarani, Kolkata, India
- Location: Kolkata, India
- Region served: India
- Website: bharatiyabhashaparishad.org

Bharatiya Bhasha Parishad, a Kolkata-based literary organization was founded on 1975 by Sitaram Seksaria and Bhagirath Kanodia with the aim of promoting Indian languages. It works for the development of Indian literature through publication of books on literature and implementation of various literary projects. It honors Indian writers for the contribution to Indian literature through their respective languages. The award consists of cash prize 1 lakh, a memento and a shawl.

== Award recipients ==
List of recipients, year, and work
Year	Recipient
1985	Shakti Dan Kaviya
2000	Binda Karandikar (Marathi), Mohapatra Nilamani Sahoo (Oriya), M. Leelavathy (Malayalam), Vasireddy Seethadevi (Telugu), Surjit Patar (Punjabi), Nilmani Phukan (Assamese).
2012–2013	Lakshmi Nandan Bora (Assamese), Kasinath Singha (Hindi), Mohanjit (Punjabi), Ashokamitran (Tamil)
2008–2009	Arun Sadhu(Marathi), Vairamuthu (Tamil)
2018	Maalan Narayanan

- Nabaneeta Dev Sen
- Tilottoma Misra was awarded the Ishan Puraskar for her novel Swarnalata in 1995.

== See also ==
- Manipuri Sahitya Parishad
- Sahitya Akademi
