= Jasodhara Bagchi =

Indian academic and feminist

- Born: c. 1937; Calcutta, British India
- Died: 9 January 2015 (aged 77–78); Kolkata, India
- Education: Presidency College, Kolkata; Somerville College, Oxford; New Hall, Cambridge

Jasodhara Bagchi (born c. 1937 – 9 January 2015) was a leading Indian feminist professor, author, critic and activist. She was the founder and director of the School of Women's Studies at Jadavpur University. Her books include Loved and Unloved – The Girl Child and Trauma and Triumph – Gender and Partition in Eastern India. She also founded the women's rights organization Sachetana.

== Early life and education ==
Bagchi was born in 1937 in Kolkata. She was educated at Presidency College, Kolkata (then affiliated with the University of Calcutta), Somerville College, Oxford, and New Hall, Cambridge.

== Career ==
Bagchi began teaching English at Jadavpur University in 1964 after teaching English at Lady Brabourne College, Calcutta. She became the founder-Director of the School of Women's Studies at Jadavpur University in 1988. After her 1997 retirement, she taught as an Emeritus Professor at the School of Women's Studies.

Bagchi served as Professor in English department from 1983, was Head of the Department from 1986 to 1988, and coordinated, in some crucial early years, the UGC Special Assistance Programme, which later became the Centre for Advanced Studies in English. Her focus areas of research include women's studies, women's writings, 19th century English and Bengali literature, the reception of Positivism in Bengal, motherhood and the Partition of India. Along with co-editor Subhoranjan Dasgupta, she was one of the first scholars to research and collect the experiences of Bengali women during and after the Partition.

She began the Bengali Women Writers Reprint Series, which is edited by the School of Women's Studies, Jadavpur University.

Professors Sajni Mukherji and Supriya Chaudhuri, her friends and colleagues at this department, edited for her a distinguished Festschrift in 2002: Literature and Gender: Essays for Jasodhara Bagchi. Contributors to this included Bagchi's cherished teachers, friends, former students, and colleagues, such as Peter Dronke, Kitty Scoular Datta, Himani Bannerji, Malini Bhattacharya, Sheila Lahiri Choudhury, Supriya Chaudhuri, Tanika Sarkar, Bhaswati Chakravorty, and Aditi Dasgupta.

Prof. Bagchi remained a regular and active participant in seminars and lectures at the department of English till her death, and was also a member of its Board of Studies for some years after retirement. In a short span of time, she came to be recognised for her immense dedication to her work and to her students. Promoting a culture of research is considered as her most significant contribution to the Department of English at Jadavpur University.

In 2014, the organisers of the Kolkata Book Fair called off the release of her book, Parijayee Nari O Manabadhikar (Migrating Women and Human Rights), due to its "controversial" nature, according to her daughter Tista Bagchi.

After her retirement, she attended several conferences in India and remained in close contact with the English Department at Jadavpur University.

== Activism ==
She is one of the founding members of the feminist organization Sachetana in Kolkata. She was also Chairperson of the West Bengal Commission for Women from October 2001 until April 2008.

Bagchi lent her support to the Hok Kolorob movement 2014 Jadavpur University protests ("let there be polyphony" in Bengali) which sought a fair and immediate investigation into the molestation of a female student in the Jadavpur University campus. She also spoke on behalf of the West Bengal Commission of Women in calling for an inquiry into molestation and rapes of females in Dhantala.

She was part of a group of five of emeritus professors that met West Bengal Governor and University Chancellor Keshari Nath Tripathi to protest the current Vice-Chancellor.

== Death and legacy ==
Bagchi died on the morning of 9 January 2015, aged 77.

Punarnaba, a voluntary organization that Bagchi was closely associated with, has organized every year since 2015 a Jasodhara Bagchi Memorial Programme, including a lecture in memory of Bagchi. The Jasodhara Bagchi Memorial Hardship Fund was set up in 2019 with the support of the family of Bagchi at the Department of English, Jadavpur University, to help cases of individual hardship among the students of the Department.

== Personal life ==
She was married to the economist, Amiya Kumar Bagchi.

== Books (authored, edited, and co-edited) ==
- Literature, Society, and Ideology in the Victorian Era (edited volume), (1992)
- Indian Women: Myth and Reality (edited volume), (1995)
- Loved and Unloved: The Girl Child in the Family (with Jaba Guha and Piyali Sengupta)(1997)
- Gem-like Flame: Walter Pater and the 19th Century Paradigm of Modernity (1997)
- Thinking Social Science in India: Essays in Honour of Alice Thorner (co-edited with Krishna Raj and Sujata Patel)(2002)
- The Trauma and the Triumph: Gender and Partition in Eastern India, 2 volumes (co-edited with Subhoranjan Dasgupta) (vol. 1 in 2003, vol. 2 in 2009)
- The Changing Status of Women in West Bengal 1970–2000: The Challenges Ahead (edited volume), (2005)
- Interrogating Motherhood (2016)
