= Sitaram Seksaria =

Indian independence activist, Gandhian, social reformer and institution builder

Sitaram Seksaria (1892–1982) was an Indian independence activist, Gandhian, social reformer and institution builder from West Bengal, known for his contributions for the upliftment of Marwari community. He was a self-educated man. He was the founder of a number of institutions and organizations, including Shri Shikshayatan, a higher educational institution and the Shri Shikshayatan College Marwari Balika Vidyalaya, a girl's primary school, Samaj Sudhar Samiti, a social organization, Bangiya Hindi Parishad, a literary society dedicated for the propagation and development of Hindi language and literature and Bharatiya Bhasha Parishad, a non governmental organization. For few years he also served as a minister in Azad Hind Fauj. The Government of India awarded him the third highest civilian honor of the Padma Bhushan, in 1962, for his contributions to society. His life story has been compiled in a book, Padma Shri Sitaram Seksaria Abhinandan Granth, edited by Bhawarmal Singhi and published in 1974. He died in 1982.
