= Abhijit Mukherjee (earth scientist) =

Indian scientist

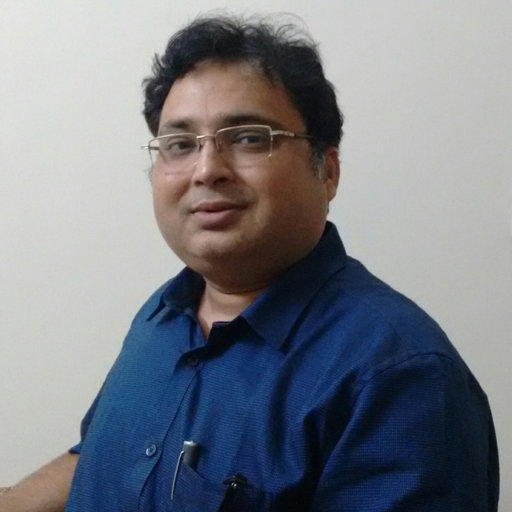
- Abhijit Mukherjee
- Born: 1975 (age 49–50)
- Occupation: Professor
- Awards: Shanti Swarup Bhatnagar Prize for Science and Technology

Abhijit Mukherjee (born 1975) is an Indian professor, scientist and currently Professor of Geology and Geophysics and the School of Environmental Science and Engineering of IIT Kharagpur. He was awarded Shanti Swarup Bhatnagar Prize for Science and Technology in 2020 in the field of Earth Atmosphere Ocean and Planetary Sciences.

== Early life ==
Mukherjee hails from Kolkata. He studied in South Point High School and Calcutta University. He went to the United States for higher studies and post-doctoral research. Mukherjee worked in Canada for several years and after returning to India joined in IIT-Kharagpur. He works there as an associate professor at the Department of Geology and Geophysics and the School of Environmental Science and Engineering.

Mukherjee completed a B.Sc.(Hons) in Geology from the Asutosh College, and his master's in University of Calcutta in 1999. He holds another master's degree from University of Kentucky in 2003. Later he completed his Ph.D there.

== Career ==
Mukherjee is currently the professor of Indian Institute of Technology from December 2022. He was elected to the Geological Society of America International Committee.

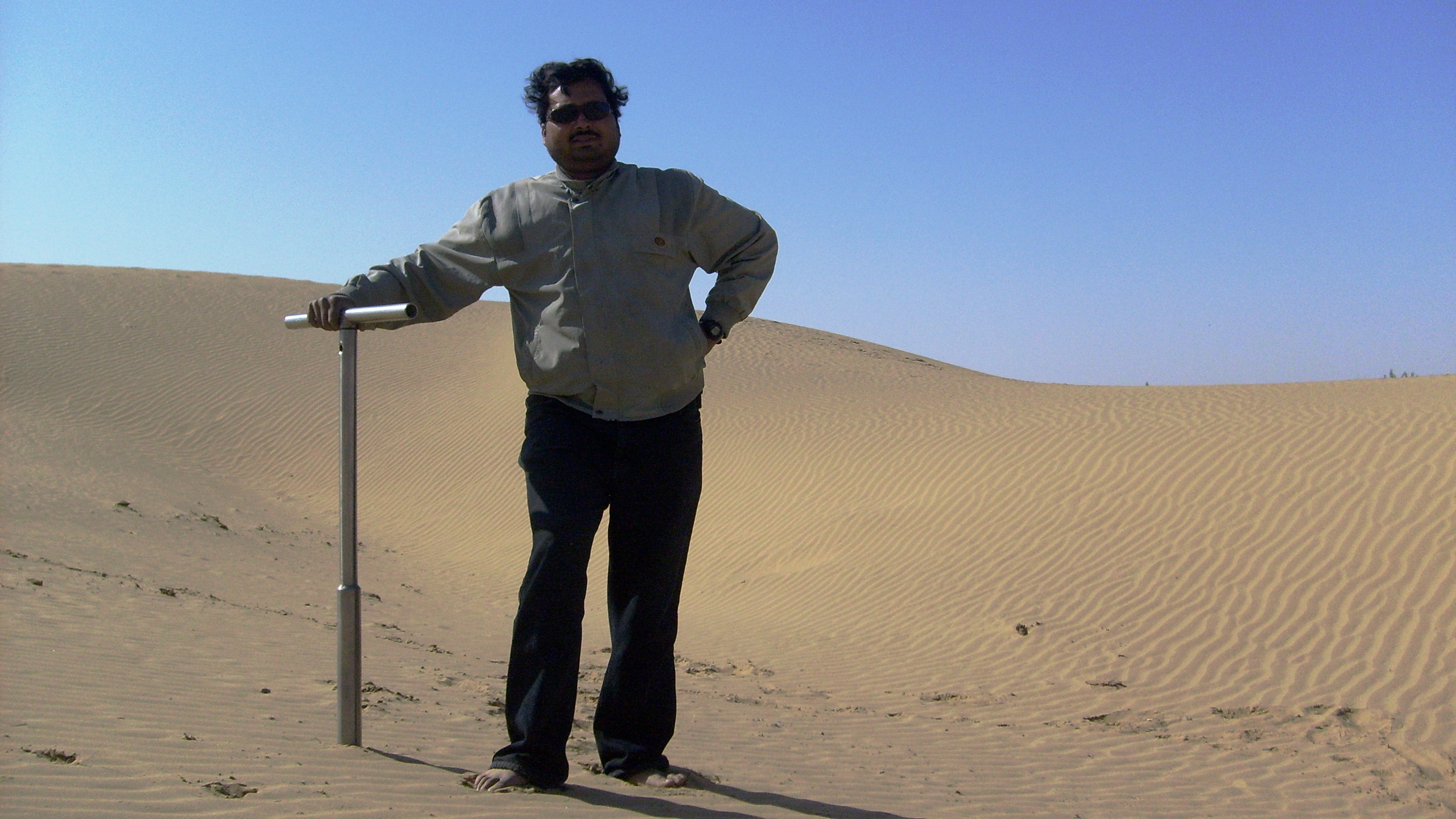
Mukherjee doing fieldwork on groundwater availability in deserts

He served as a physical hydrogeologist at Alberta Geological Survey, Energy Resources Conservation Board of Government of Alberta. He was a postdoctoral Fellow at the Bureau of Economic Geology, Jackson School of Geoscience in 2006–2008 under the supervision of Prof. Bridget Scanlon. Mukherjee also holds a Professional Diploma in Software Engineering, from National Institute of Information Technology, in 2001.

== Research ==
Mukherjee's works have been acknowledged nationally and internationally. He researched the subject of groundwater exploration for suitable and sustainable drinking water sources including arsenic and other contaminants. His research group developed an AI prediction model for detecting groundwater arsenic in the Ganges Delta.

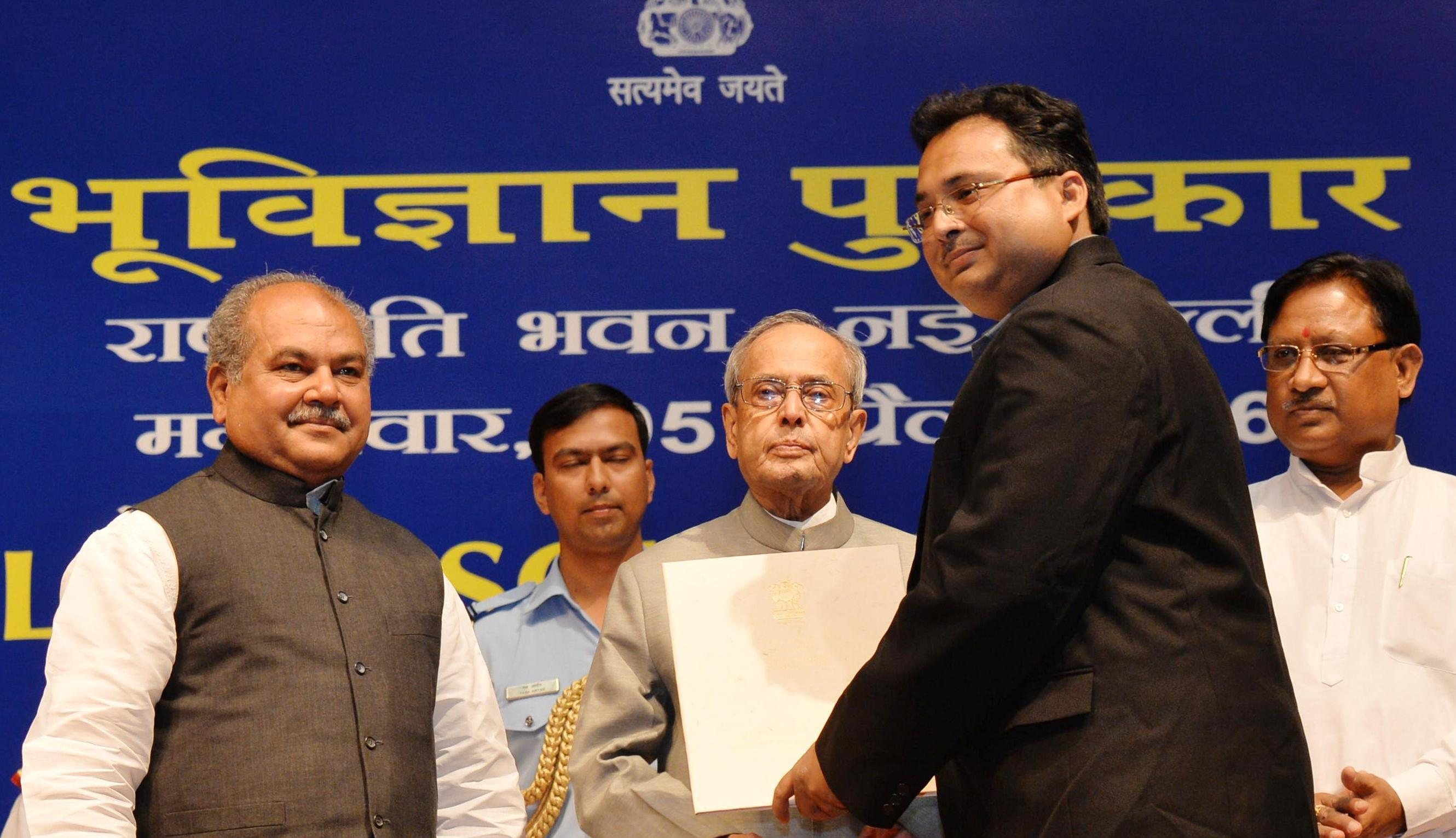
Mukherjee receiving the National Geoscience Award in 2016

Mukherjee is regarded as one of the most well known hydrogeologists in South Asia. He has done field-based and numerical research on the quality and quantity of groundwater-sourced drinking water across India. He has significantly contributed to the recent advancement of groundwater research in India. Mukherjee's recent research work has significantly contributed to support and evaluate the Government of India's missions like MNREGA on groundwater rejuvenation in India. His research work on geological and human influences on groundwater pollution (arsenic, pesticide, sanitation-sourced pollution) in the Indus-Ganga-Brahmaputra river basins has attracted wide national and international attention.

== Awards and recognitions ==
- Shanti Swarup Bhatnagar Prize
- Kharaka Award
- Faculty Excellence Award
- Asian Scientist 100
- Newton-Bhabha Research Grant Award
- National Geoscience Award
- Young Scientist Award
- Graduate Research Award

== Books ==
- Mukherjee, A., Scanlon, B. R., Aureli, A., Langan, S., Guo, H., & McKenzie, A. A. (Eds.). (2020). Global groundwater: source, scarcity, sustainability, security, and solutions. Elsevier.
- Mukherjee, Abhijit, ed. Riverine Systems : Understanding the Hydrological, Hydrosocial and Hydro-Heritage Dynamics. Cham, Switzerland: Springer, 2022. Print.
- Mukherjee, A. (ed.), 2018. Groundwater of South Asia.Springer, ISBN 978-981-10-3888-4, 799 pgs.
- Ramanathan, A., Johnston, S., Mukherjee, A., Nath, B. (eds.), 2015. Safe and sustainability use of arsenic-contaminated aquifers in the Gangetic plain. Springer, ISBN 978-3-319-16123-5.
