= Birla Corporation =

Indian-based company of the chandu Birla Group

Birla Corporation Limited
- Type: public company
- Traded as: BSE: 500335; NSE: BIRLACORPN
- ISIN: INE340A01012
- Industry: Conglomerate
- Founded: 1910; 116 years ago
- Headquarters: Kolkata, WestBengal
- Key people: Madhav Prasad Birla (Co-founder); Shri Ghanshyam Das Birla (Co-founder)
- Owner: M.P Birla Group
- Website: birlacorporation.com

Birla Corporation Limited is an Indian-based company of the M.P Birla Group, founded by Ghanshyam Das Birla in the late 1910s and carried on by Madhav Prasad Birla.

In the 1890s, Birla Corporation was a jute manufacturing company, but over time, it grew to operate four main divisions: cement, jute, linoleum, and auto trim. It is not a part of the Aditya Birla Group, a multinational conglomerate with products ranging from metals, cements, textiles, agricultural businesses, telecommunications, IT, and financial services. Formerly known as Birla Jute Manufacturing Company Limited, with the expansion of divisions, the company changed their name in 1998 to Birla Corporation Limited.

== History ==
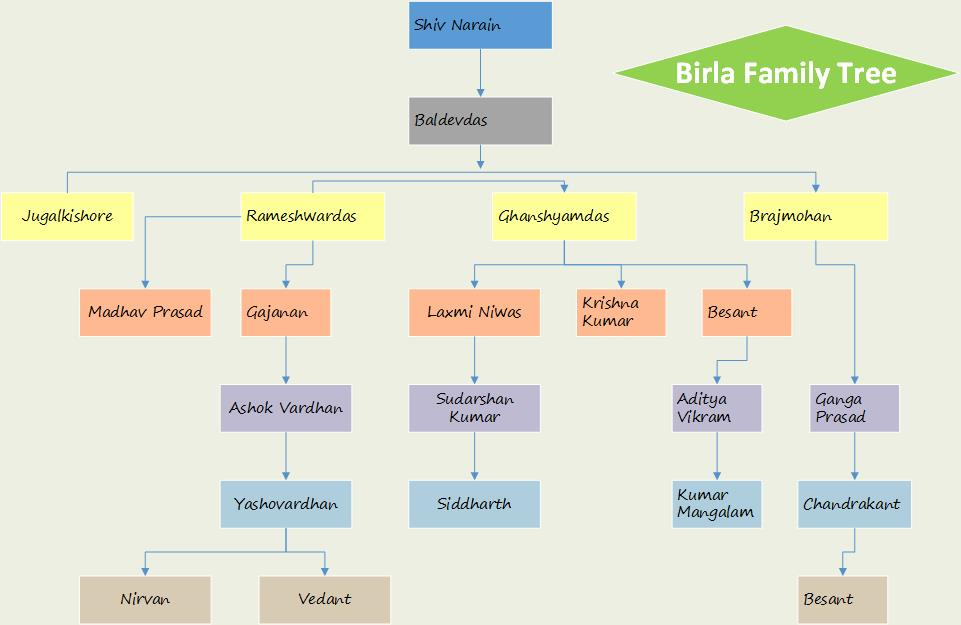
Family tree of Birla group companies

=== Before Birla Corporation Ltd. ===
Ghanshyam Das Birla’s grandfather, Shiv Narayana Birla, used his capital from a moneylending business and started a cotton business. With a successful venture, he went back to Pilani, his birthplace, and built a mansion for the family. Business boomed with World War I as the British Empire relied on Birla to provide for the war efforts. GD Birla inherited the family business and expanded into many industries, and by 1919, the Birla Brothers Limited was formed with his other three siblings. He ventured into the motor vehicle industry, tea, textiles, cement, chemicals, and by 1942, also organized the United Commercial Bank Limited, one of the first commercial banks of India. While still in the early years of the Birla Group, an inkling of the future of Birla Brothers Limited was depicted in GD Birla’s life.

=== Founding of Birla Corporation Ltd. ===
Born in 1918, Madhav Prasad of Bombay, son of RD Birla, was a part of the Birla Jute Manufacturing Company since the beginning. By the time he finished college, he was already in charge of Birla Jute which had suffered economic downturns and wars. Madhav changed the company from Birla Jute Manufacturing Company to a company with activities across a wide spectrum of industries. In MP Birla’s time, Birla Corporation and the other businesses under Birla Group gained significant power and stance in the cement, auto trims, steel, and building materials. When he died in 1990, his wife, Priyamvada Birla took over as the chairman of Birla in 1998 and changed the name to Birla Corporation Limited. Priyamvada was known for her active roles in the community, healthcare, and education.

== Businesses ==
- Birla Jute Supply Company Ltd - Operates in manufacturing and trading of jute products, focusing on sustainable packaging solutions.
- Budge Budge Floorcoverings Ltd - Specializes in manufacturing and exporting eco-friendly jute floor coverings, rugs, and home décor products.
- Hindustan Gums & Chemicals Ltd - Produces guar gum and derivatives, catering to industries like food, pharmaceuticals, textiles, and oil drilling.
- Lok Cements Ltd - Focuses on manufacturing and distributing high-quality cement products for construction and infrastructure projects.
- RCCPL Pvt Ltd - Manufactures and markets premium-grade cement for construction and infrastructure projects.

=== Recent Events ===
In 2013, Birla Corporation merged with its subsidiary company, Talavadi Cements Ltd as the firm could not meet requirements for raw materials due to a ban on the mines in Rajasthan. This caused a decrease in the Birla stock around the months of June and July.

== Problems ==
=== Birla vs Lodha dispute ===
When Priyamvada died in 2004, she gave the Rs 5000 crore estate to her close accountant, Rajendra Singh Lodha, who was a co-chairman. Lodha eventually became chairman of Birla Corporation. This estate included key holdings in the East India Investments Co and Gwalior Webbing, Birla Corporation, Vidhya Telelinks, and Universal cables, among others. However, the Birla family challenged the Lodha family in court in 2008 about the contents of the will, and Priyamvada’s previous two wills. The case changed course with the sudden death of RS Lodha in October 2008. In her will, Priyamvada declared that after RS Lodha, his son, Harsh Lodha would inherit the estates. Since the will was written in 1999 and was not officially granted "probate," the Lodha family currently holds the MP Birla group.

=== Cement in 2011 ===
In 2011, Birla Corporation faced problems with overproduction of cement during a long period of decreasing demand. Naturally, Harsh Lodha became worried for the corporation since cement is the largest revenue generator for Birla Corp. He is currently looking into other alternatives for growth in the coal industry. Meanwhile, Birla Corporation has signed a Memorandum of Understanding (MoU) with Assam Mineral Development for a cement plant in Assam where Birla will invest Rs 2500 crores over a time span of three years. In November 2017 it was announced that M.P Birla Cement had agreed to become the co-sponsor Mohun Bagan AC for the period between December 2019.

=== Harsh Lodha indicted ===
Harsh Lodha and his brother, Aditya Lodha, were indicted in 2013 for malpractice. Three members of the Birla Corporation, Om Prakash Agarwal, Suresh Kumar Sharma, and Shashi Agarwal claimed there was malpractice in the firm and alleged misconduct in falsifying the information about the number of partners in the firm. This was a problem as Aditya Lodha had a part in the Chartered Accountant firm Lodha and Company. His brother, Harsh, was the chairman of Birla Corporation. At the time, Lodha and Company was the auditor of Birla Corporations. As a result, the ICAI suspended Harsh and Aditya Lodha for 3 months.

=== Removal and reinstatement of Harsh Vardhan Lodha ===
On 19 September 2020, the Calcutta High Court ordered the removal of Harsh Vardhan Lodha from all the directorships and other positions in the trust's and societies of the MP Birla Group of Companies.

In July 2021, The Supreme Court ruled that Harsh Vardhan Lodha can continue as director and chairman in Birla Corporation, Universal Cables, Vindhya Telelinks and Birla Cable. However the company has been a part of major controversies since the reinstatement of Harsh Vardhan Lodha.

== Philanthropy ==
=== Healthcare ===
Birla Corporation is a supporter of health, education, and social welfare under the MP Birla Group. Priyamvada Birla showed an interest in health care, helping to build hospitals and funding research ranging from eye health to cardiology, oncology, neurology, and orthopedics. She also founded the Priyamvada Birla Cancer Research Institute and joined with Aravind Eye Care Center to build the Priyamvada Birla Aravind Eye Hospital. After the death of Priyamvada Birla, the healthcare units like hospitals and research centres under her leadership have reached a stagnant phase with no major improvements in research and development factor. Medical students train at these hospitals.

=== Education ===
The MP Birla Foundation built many schools in India. These schools include institutions, industrial training in computers, mechanical and electrical studies, a Sanskrit school for students interested in Vedic studies. They also cater to children of employees at Birla with an education taught in Hindi and financial aid for students.

Chairpersons

- Ghanshyamdas Birla
- M. P. Birla (d. 1990)
- Mrs. Priyamvada Birla (d. 3 July 2004)
- R. S. Lodha (d. 3 October 2008)

== See also ==
- Birla family
