= Bombay Hospital =

- Bombay Hospital Trust
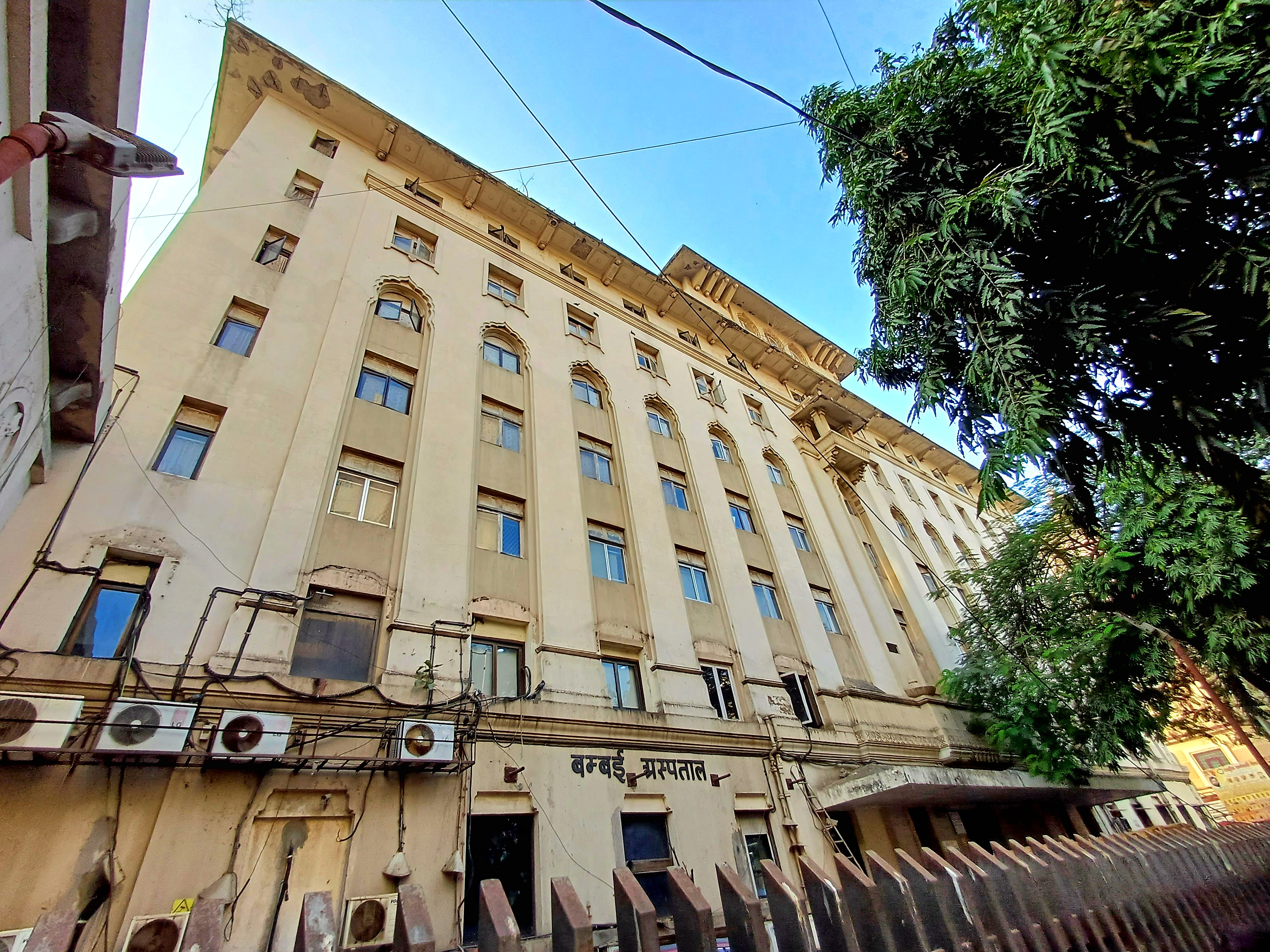
- Bombay Hospital in 2024

- Shown in Mumbai

Geography
- Location: Marine Lines, Mumbai, Maharashtra, India
- Coordinates: 18.941°N 72.828°E

Organisation
- Care system: Private
- Type: General

Services
- Emergency department: No
- Beds: 500

History
- Founded: 1950

Links
- Website: https://bombayhospital.com
- Lists: Hospitals in India

Bombay Hospital (BHMRC; Bombay Hospital and Medical Research Centre – Mumbai) is a private hospital in Mumbai, India. It was founded in 1950 by R. D. Birla.

It has 500 beds, 110 of which are in the critical care and recovery area. It has 22 operating theatres, 3,200 full-time employees, 240 eminent consultants and 200 resident doctors. In the R D Birla International Cardiac Centre associated with Bombay Hospital, there are four dedicated operation theatres and two cath labs where 1,800 surgeries and 4,000 angiographies/angioplasties are conducted each year. The department of neurosurgery and neurology also has four dedicated operation theatres. The department of orthopaedics has four dedicated operation theatres.

The departments include:

- Department of neurosurgery and neurology
- Department of orthopaedics
- Department of cancer
- Department of nephrology and urology
- Department of imaging with facilities for CT scan, MRI, and other facilities

It is one of the oldest premiere private hospitals in Mumbai.
