= Sucharit Sarkar =

Indian topologist and professor of mathematics (born 1983)

- Born: 1983 (age 42–43); Calcutta, West Bengal, India
- Education: Princeton University (Ph.D.); Indian Statistical Institute (Bachelor)
- Spouse: Pami Mukherjee
- Children: 1
- Scientific career
- Fields: Mathematics
- Workplaces: University of California, Los Angeles
- Thesis: Topics in Heegaard Floer homology (2009)
- Doctoral advisor: Zoltán Szabó
- Website: www.math.ucla.edu/~sucharit/

Sucharit Sarkar (born 1983) is an Indian topologist and professor of mathematics at the University of California, Los Angeles who works in low-dimensional topology.

== Education and career ==
Sarkar attended secondary school at South Point High School in his hometown, Calcutta, India. In the International Mathematical Olympiads in 2001 and 2002, he received gold and silver medals respectively. He completed his Bachelor of Mathematics degree from the Indian Statistical Institute, Bangalore from 2002 to 2005.

Sarkar received his Ph.D. from Princeton University in 2009 under the guidance of Zoltán Szabó. He went on to postdoctoral fellowships at the Mathematical Sciences Research Institute and Columbia University, before becoming an assistant professor at Princeton University in 2012. In 2016 he moved to the University of California, Los Angeles.

Sarkar's research area is low-dimensional topology, with particular interests in knot theory, Heegaard Floer homology, and Khovanov homology.

== Awards and honors ==
- Sarkar was an invited speaker at the International Congress of Mathematicians in Rio de Janeiro in 2018.
- Sarkar was a Clay Research Fellow from 2009 until 2013.
