= M. P. Birla Foundation Higher Secondary School =

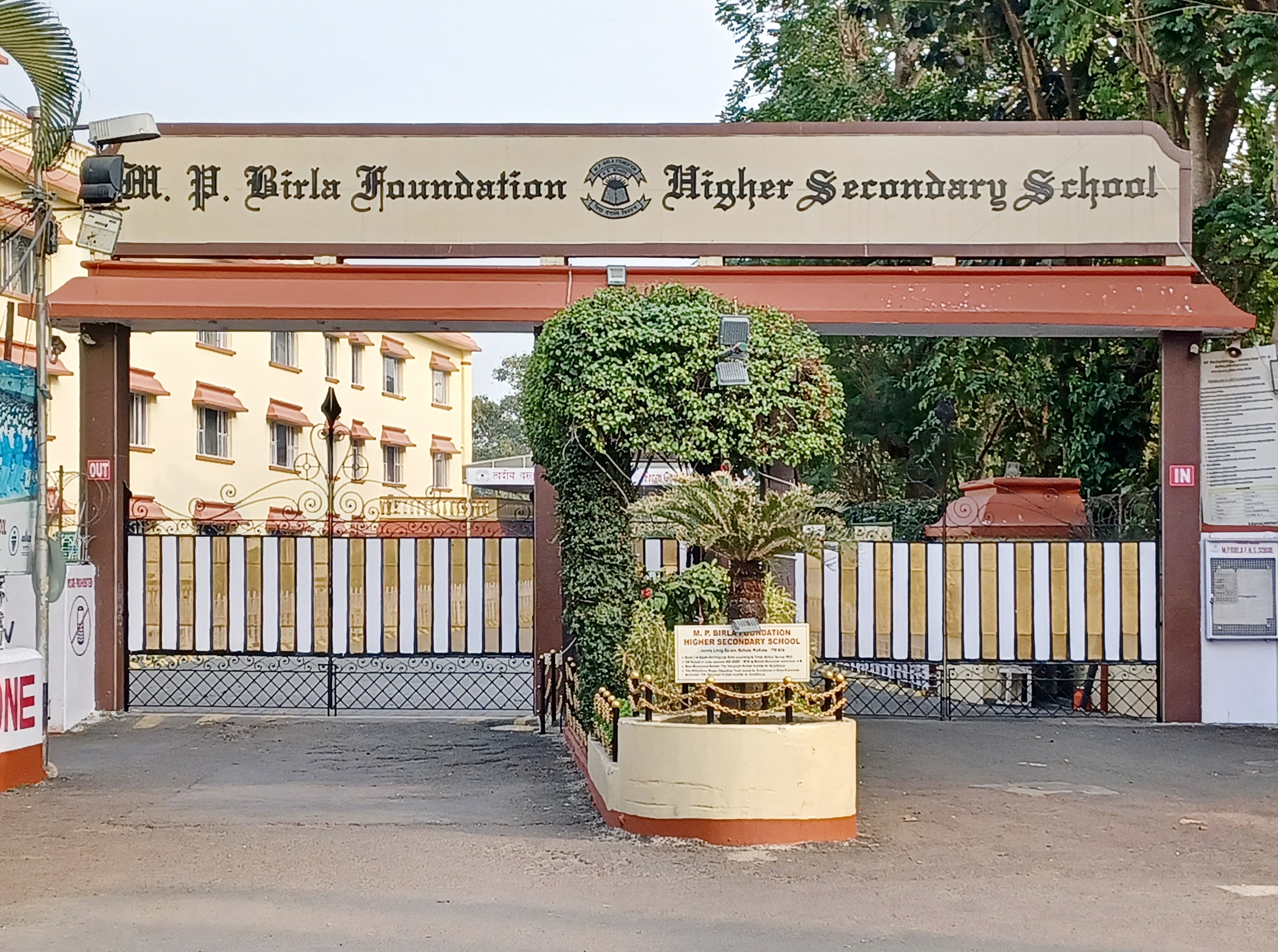

Location
- James Long Sarani; Behala; Kolkata, West Bengal 700034; India; 22°29′35.21″N 88°19′9.75″E

Information
- Type: Private
- Motto: विद्या ददाति विनयं Vidya Dadati Vinayam ("Knowledge generates Humility")
- Established: 1988
- Principal: Purnima Chatterjee
- Staff: Around 200
- Enrollment: 3450
- Affiliation: CISCE
- Website: http://mpbfhsschool.com

M.P. Birla Foundation Higher Secondary School is a private school in Kolkata, West Bengal, India. It is coeducational and teaches in English. The school started in 1988. It is run by the M.P. Birla Group, an Indian industrial Conglomerate owned by the Birla family.

The principal of the school was Mr. Herbert George whose tenure lasted from its founding in 1988 until his death in 2020. It is located in James Long Sarani, Behala, Kolkata. It follows the CISCE board of education. The school followed CBSE before switching to CISCE.

== History ==
Founded by Madhav Prasad Birla (1918 – 1990), an Indian philanthropist and his wife Priyamvada Devi Birla (1928 – 2004) in 1988.

In late 2017, a scandal occurred where two non teaching faculty members were accused by the parents of a three year old child for sexually abusing their daughter which happened right after a similar case in another school in the city which led to the eventual arrest of the accused and sparked protests by parents outside school gates.

In 2020, Herbert George who had been principal since the school founding, died at the age of 75. Purnima Chatterjee, who had worked as vice principal under him, became the 2nd principal of the school.

In April 2024, ten students of the school were invited to sit beside Indian Prime Minister Narendra Modi in the inauguration of an underwater metro tunnel in the city.

== Notable alumni ==
- Abhishek Banerjee – leader of Trinamool Youth Congress
- Tridha Choudhury – Tollywood actress
- Anupam Roy – Indian Singer & Composer
- Sayantani Ghosh – TV actress

== See also ==
- List of schools in Kolkata
- List of schools in West Bengal
