= South Point School =

Private school in Kolkata, West Bengal

South Point School and South Point High School, Kolkata

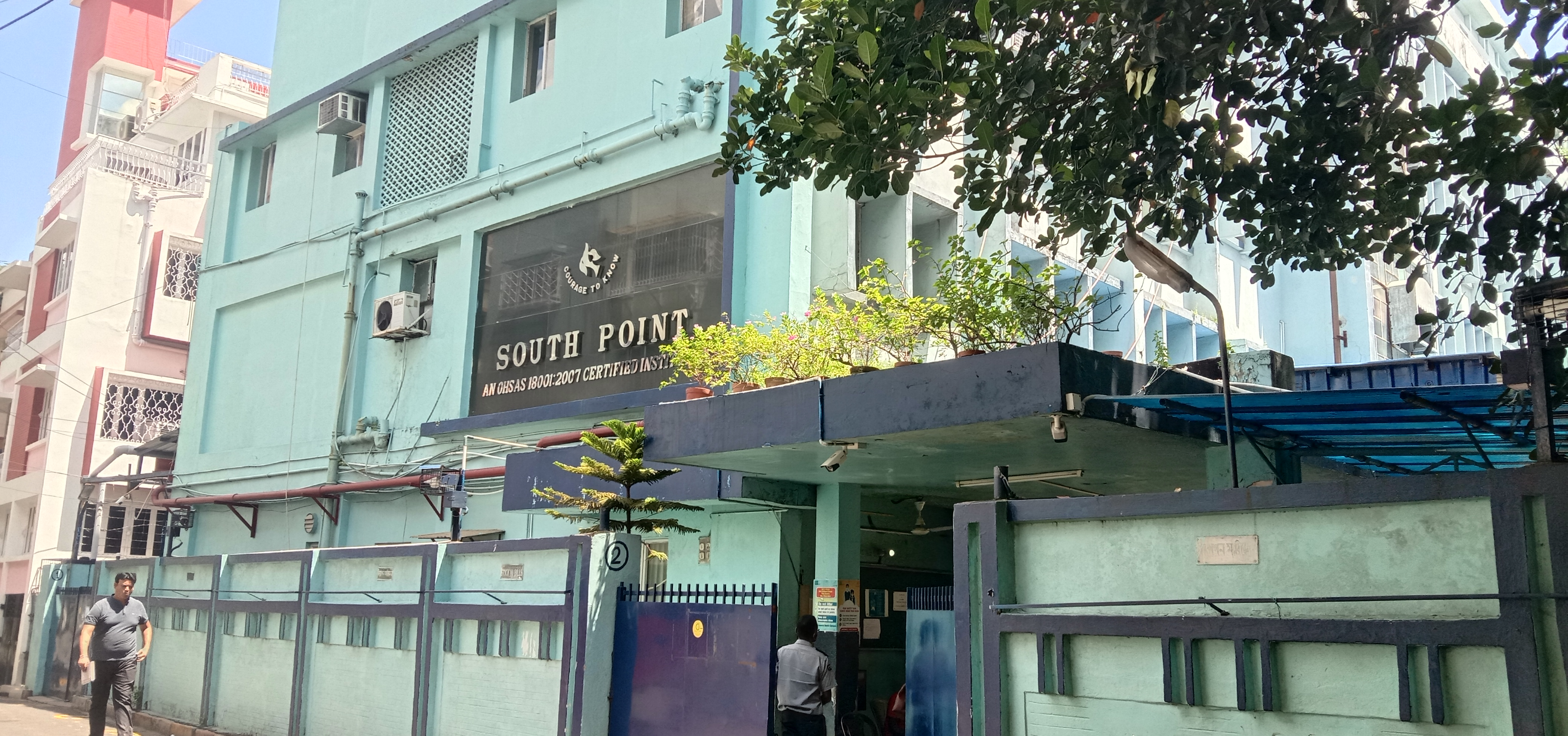
- South Point High School entrance

Location
- Birla Building, 9/1 R. N. Mukherjee Road (Education Society); 16 Mandeville Gardens (junior school); 82/7A Ballygunge Place (high school); Kolkata, West Bengal; India; 22°31′22″N 88°22′01″E

Information
- Type: Private school
- Motto: Courage to Know
- Established: 1954; 72 years ago
- Founder: Satikanta Guha
- Principal: D. K. Chadda (Junior School)
- Principal: Jaidev Ghosh (High School)
- Faculty: 360 (junior school); 390 (high school)
- Teaching staff: 200 (junior school); 270 (high school)
- Grades: Nursery I to V (junior school); VI to XII (high school)
- Enrollment: ≈12000
- Colours: Navy blue, gold and white
- Publication: Nursery books, mathematics books, song books and CDs(junior school), Pointer (school magazine)
- Affiliation: Central Board of Secondary Education
- Website: www.southpoint.ac.in

South Point is a higher-secondary co-educational private school located in Kolkata, West Bengal and affiliated to Central Board of Secondary Education, consisting of three organisations – South Point School (nursery to Class V), South Point High School (classes VI to XII) and South Point Education Society (administrative authority). The school operates in two shifts for all classes: morning and afternoon. The school opened in 1954 and was the first co-educational school in Kolkata. Higher secondary (10+2) education was introduced in 1960.

The school entered the Guinness Book of World Records as the largest educational institute of the world in 1984 until 1992, in terms of student numbers. Regarded by many national school surveys as one of the best schools in India, the school has educated noted academics, politicians, artists, filmmakers, and entertainers. The school has among its alumni a Nobel laureate, several Shanti Swarup Bhatnagar Prize for Science and Technology laureates, and winners of National Film Awards.

== History ==
Founded on 1 April 1954 at 16 Mandeville Gardens, Kolkata, by Satikanta Guha and his wife, Pritylata Guha, the institution began as the first English medium co-educational school in Kolkata with just twenty students. The founders’ vision was supported by a small, devoted group of teachers, with the initial faculty comprising prominent figures from Bengal's cultural, literary, and artistic circles.

Initially operational as a single unit, the school split into two buildings, with the high school shifting to Ballygunge Place in 1980. The school initially had among its faculty, noted actor and director Utpal Dutt, teaching English Literature, Gita Ghatak, noted Rabindra Sangeet vocalist and acclaimed actress as a teacher of music, Kamal Kumar Majumdar, noted Bengali writer and critic, teaching Bengali and his younger sister, the artist Shanu Lahiri teaching arts and crafts.

South Point received the OHSAS 18001:2007 Occupational Health and Safety Management Certification from the British Standards Institution (BSI). At present South Point is an ISO 45001:2018 Certified Institution.

In 2023, the institution marked its Platinum Jubilee (70th anniversary). To commemorate the milestone, India Post unveiled a special commemorative school postage stamp. As part of the celebration, pupils participated in a letter-writing activity where they wrote to their parents and posted the envelopes using the newly unveiled school stamp. The same year they planted 70 green saplings at a ceremony named ‘Roots and Wings’ at the Joka Agricultural and Horticultural Society, Pailan.

== Emblem and objective ==
The School Emblem, showing a bird (resembling a dove) in flight, symbolizes "man's everlasting quest for knowledge and the desire to soar above the mundane." The motto of the School is 'Courage to Know'. It is a tribute to all those who, in the face of blind prejudice, religious bigotry, social ostracism and even death, refused to give up their search for truth.

== Governance ==
- Governing Council President: Justice K.S. Jhaveri (Retd.)
- South Point School (SPS): Administered by Principal Smt. Dalbir Kaur Chadda.
- South Point High School (SPHS): Administered by Principal and Secretary Shri Jaidev Ghosh.

Shri Sushil Kumar Daga is the Chairman of the South Point High School Managing Committee.

== Priyamvada Birla Campus ==
In order to address space constraints and enhance infrastructure, South Point School and South Point High School will move to a new and much larger 6.65 acre campus named the Priyamvada Birla Campus of South Point named after the late Smt. Priyamvada Birla, philanthropist and wife of M.P. Birla Group founder Late Shri Madhav Prasad Birla. The campus is currently under construction. The construction site is situated in Mukundapur, off EM Bypass, Kolkata. It is set to start operations in the academic year 2027-28.

== Notable alumni ==
Academia
Sciences

- Saurabh Bagchi, Professor of Computer Science, Purdue University, ACM, IFIP, IEEE Distinguished Scientist, Humboldt Fellow
- Abhijit Vinayak Banerjee, Professor of Economics, MIT, Nobel Laureate in Economics, 2019
- Sumit Ranjan Das, high energy physicist and Shanti Swarup Bhatnagar Prize for Science and Technology laureate
- Abhik Ghosh, chemist, professor, and winner of the Hans Fischer Career Award (2022) for lifetime contributions
- Abhijit Mukherjee, scientist and Shanti Swarup Bhatnagar Prize for Science and Technology laureate
- Amitava Raychaudhuri, Shanti Swarup Bhatnagar Prize for Science and Technology laureate, physicist, professor emeritus, Department of Physics, Calcutta University (nephew of Amal Kumar Raychaudhuri)
- Sucharit Sarkar, mathematician

Humanities

- Supriya Chaudhuri, scholar of English literature, professor emerita of Jadavpur University

Writers

- Aroup Chatterjee, doctor, writer and critic
- Shamik Ghosh, Sahitya Akademi Youth Award-winning Bengali writer (2017; Government of India)
- Anuradha Roy, author whose book Sleeping on Jupiter was longlisted for the 2015 Man Booker Prize

Arts and entertainment

- Tanmoy Bose, percussionist and tabla player
- Bhaswar Chatterjee, actor
- Prosenjit Chatterjee, National Film Award-winning Bengali actor and Bengal Vibhushan (West Bengal Government) awardee
- Saswata Chatterjee, critically acclaimed National Film Award-winning Bengali actor
- Aniruddha Roy Chowdhury, National Film Award-winning filmmaker
- Sourav Das, Bengali actor
- Swarup Dutta, veteran Bengali actor
- Rituparno Ghosh, National Film Award-winning filmmaker
- Pratim D. Gupta, film critic, journalist, filmmaker
- Bauddhayan Mukherji, National Film Award-winning filmmaker
- Kamalini Mukherji, Rabindrasangeet vocalist
- Srijit Mukherji, National Film Award-winning filmmaker and screenwriter
- Bedabrata Pain, National Film Award-winning filmmaker, scientist, and inventor
- Sandip Ray, National Film Award-winning filmmaker (son of Satyajit Ray)
- Riddhi Sen, National Film Award-winning actor
- Subrata Sen, filmmaker

Politics

- Indranil Khan, Minister of State (Independent Charge), Government of West Bengal, Department of Youth Services and Sports Department of Consumer Affairs
- Papiya Adhikari, actress and politician
- Ritabrata Banerjee, politician, Member of Rajya Sabha, India
- Nilotpal Basu, CPI(M)Politician, Ex Member of Rajya Sabha India
- Srijan Bhattacharyya, Left Student Activist, SFI Leader and CPI(M) Leader
- Shatarup Ghosh, CPI(M) activist leader
