= Shri Shikshayatan College =

Women's liberal arts college in Kolkata, India

- Type: Private
- Established: 8 July 1955; 71 years ago
- Affiliations: University of Calcutta
- President: G. K. Khaitan
- Principal: Dr. Tania Chakraborty
- Location: 11, Lord Sinha Road, Kolkata, West Bengal, India
- Campus: Urban
- Website: shrishikshayatancollege.org

Shri Shikshayatan College is an undergraduate women's liberal arts college in Kolkata, India. It was founded on 8 July 1955. It is affiliated with the University of Calcutta.Sitaram Seksaria played major role in founding of the college.

== Courses ==
- Bengali
- Botany
- Chemistry
- Computer science
- Economics
- Education
- English
- Geography
- Hindi
- History
- Mathematics
- Philosophy
- Physics
- Political science
- Sociology
- Zoology
- Urdu
- Statistics
- Commerce
- Business Administration
- Journalism And Mass Communication

=== Post Graduate ===
- Commerce
- English
- B. Ed

== Notable alumni ==
- Mamata Banerjee, 8th Chief Minister of West Bengal
- Usha Ganguly, theatre director
- Gauri Ayyub, social worker, activist, writer and teacher
- Trina Saha, actress
