= Madhav Prasad Birla =

Indian businessman (1918–1990)

M. P. Birla
- Born: 4 July 1918
- Died: 30 July 1990 (aged 72); Calcutta
- Family: Birla family

Madhav Prasad Birla (1918–1990) was an Indian entrepreneur based at Calcutta, West Bengal, India.

== Biography ==
He was born in Mumbai on 4 July 1918. He is the founder of M.P. Birla Group. He was married to Smt. Priyamvada Devi. He had set up a host of companies like Birla Corp, Universal Cables, Vindhya Telelinks, Hindustan Gum & Chemicals, Digvijay Woollen Mills, Indian Smelting. He also established Birla Planetarium & Belle Vue Clinic and several schools in Calcutta. He also served as vice chairman of Bombay Hospital Trust.

He died on 30 July 1990 at Calcutta.

== See also ==
- Birla family
- M. P. Birla Foundation Higher Secondary School
