= Goenka =

Goenka is an Indian surname. Notable people with the surname include:

- Anupriya Goenka (b. 1987), Indian actress and model
- Ramnath Goenka (1904–1991), freedom fighter and owner of The Indian Express daily
- Shyam Sunder Goenka (1932–2002), Indian entrepreneur, founder of Tally Solutions
- S. N. Goenka (1924–2013), prominent teacher of Vipassana meditation
- Badridas Goenka (1883–1973), patriarch of the Goenka industrial family
  - Keshav Prasad Goenka (1912–1983), son of BD Goenka
    - Rama Prasad Goenka (1930–2013), son of KP Goenka
      - Harsh Goenka (born 1957), son of RP Goenka, patron of RPG
      - Sanjiv Goenka (born 1961), son of RP Goenka, patron of RPSG

== See also ==
- RPG Group, an Indian industrial and services conglomerate founded by Rama Prasad Goenka
- RP-Sanjiv Goenka Group, an Indian multinational conglomerate
