= Indian Chamber of Commerce =

Trade association in India

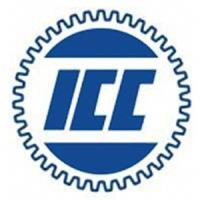
- Abbreviation: ICC
- Formation: 1925
- Founder: Pioneering Indian Industrialists led by Ghanshyam Das Birla
- Founded at: Kolkata
- Purpose: Policy advocacy
- Headquarters: Kolkata, India
- Location: India
- Region served: India
- Members: 2
- Official language: English, Hindi
- Website: https://www.indianchamber.org/

Indian Chamber of Commerce is a non-governmental trade association and advocacy group having its headquarter situated in Kolkata, India. It is one of the oldest trade association in the country and it was founded in year 1925.

ICC's current president is Brij Bhushan Agarwal and Rajeev Singh is the current Director General.

ICC's main activities includes dispute resolution and policy advocacy.

== History ==
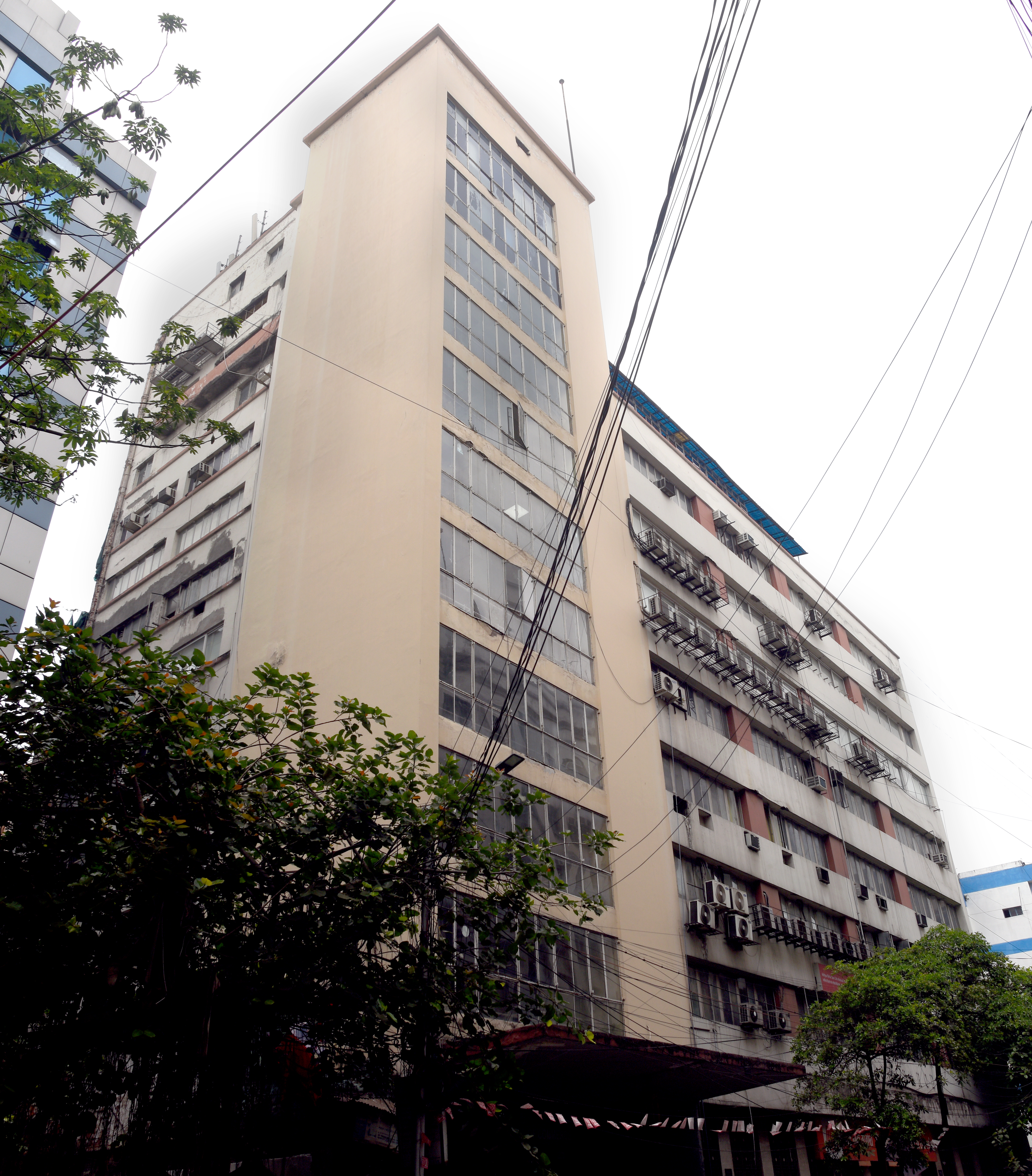
The Indian Chamber of Commerce Headquarter in Kolkata, India

It was founded by pioneering Indian Industrialists based in Calcutta during British Raj, led by Ghanshyam Das Birla. They also have offices in New Delhi, Mumbai, Chennai, Guwahati, Bhubaneshwar, Bengaluru, Hyderabad, Agartala, Siliguri, Ranchi and Patna. It opened its first international office in Rome, Italy in 2023 appointing Vas Shenoy as its Chief Representative. The Chamber was also closely associated with the Indian Freedom Movement.

Several of the distinguished industry leaders in India have led the ICC as its president, names of few are mentioned:- 1926– 27 Founding President – Ghanshyam Das Birla (1926–27) – D. P. Khaitan(1930), S. K. Bhattar (1931–32) Amritlal Ojha (1933–34), Brij Mohan Birla (1936), Ardeshir Dalal (1938), G. L. Mehta (1939) Sir Badridas Goenka (1941), R. L. Nopany (1942), Sir Abdul Halim Ghaznavi (1945), K. D. Jalan (1946), K. P. Goenka (1948), S. P. Jain (1950) Lakshmi Niwas Birla (1951), Sir B. P. Singh Roy (1952), Karamchand Thapar (1953), G. D. Binani (1954), M L Shah (1959) R. H. Mody (1960), K. K. Birla (1963), C. L. Bajoria (1965) I. M. Thapar (1967) R. P. Goenka (1970), R S Lodha (1984) J. N. Sapru (1988) to name a few.

== Membership ==
The ICC offers two membership categories in the association:

1. The Corporate Group Membership
2. The Ordinary Membership

== Services ==
=== Certificate of Origin ===
ICC issues non-preferential certificates of origin to both member and non-member companies. This is a document, used to certify that the export products are wholly obtained, produced or manufactured in India.

=== ICC Council of Arbitration ===
Indian Chamber of Commerce (ICC) dedicated to the mission of extending institutional service for the Alternative Dispute Resolution (ADR) of commercial disputes.

== Allied Organizations ==
- Manipur Chamber of Commerce & Industry
- Tea Association of India.

== Training and events ==
ICC organized National Conference & Round Table Meetings on MSME Financing & Strengthening MSME Linkages on 19 and 20 September 2014 at Swabhumi, Rangmanch, Kolkata .Objective of the Conference was to bring all stakeholders in a same platform & create linkages for fostering growth & development in this sector.

The North East Business Summit is a joint event of the Department of Development of the North Eastern Region (DoNER), Government of India, and the Indian Chamber of Commerce, to showcase the strengths of the Northeastern region and to present significant business opportunities

It provides the facility of inter-state movement of goods by offering registration of vehicles and construction of roads. Labour laws: It interacts with the government on issues of labour laws. It holds various exhibitions across the continent.

ICC organized "Reverse buyer seller meet, textile" meet to give global exposure to small players lacking the fund to go and invest outside the country.

ICC organized "Tea Conclave 2019" in which Tea Board Chairman P K Bezbaruahtea state that organized sector is facing the "biggest threat" from the combination of small growers and bought leaf factories (BLF), which are operating at a low cost level. also has been dealing with "inflexible" labour laws and demand-supply mismatch.

In an interactive session organized by ICC, Cuba and India ties to increase the two-way trade volume.

ICC's Environment Care conference focused on safe and sustainable environment for which state government is focused on CNG & fossil fuel. ICC with the department of State Food Processing Industries and Horticulture, organized "The Bangla Mango Utsav (Bengal Mango Festival)" held at the Netaji Indoor Stadium in Kolkata with the view to promote mango and mango products.

ICC with the department of State Food Processing Industries and Horticulture, organized "The Bangla Mango Utsav (Bengal Mango Festival)" held at the Netaji Indoor Stadium in Kolkata with the view to promote mango and mango products.

ICC with the cooperation of state governments has organized "Energy Conclave 2022 – Synergy in Energy" with the motive of development and consolidation of the energy sector.

ICC to improve high quality and equitable education organized a Edtech summit that focused benchmark of 1:15 teacher-student ratio to ensure imparting high quality education.

ICC's Tea Meeting expanded trade and commercial linkages between India and US.

ICC at the State Convention Centre, Shillong to conservation of water organized North East Water Conclave.

ICC with State Pollution Control Board, Odisha is organized the 3rd Edition of National Conference on "Climate Change Initiatives – "Alternative energy and mobility solution towards achieving Net Zero".

ICC hosted Business Conference to build Collaborations with Central Vietnam.

ICC to develop green hydrogen organize a conference with Danish companies.

Indian Chamber of Commerce (ICC) organized the Mutual Fund Conclave 2022–23 in Ranchi on Friday.

== ICC Publications ==
ICC Publications is the publishing arm of the Indian Chamber of Commerce providing business with essential resources in three broad categories: ICC Business Directory, ICC Economique & ICC Asia Pacific Watch.

== Business Information Services ==
ICC launched a Trade Facilitation Desk to facilitate trade & business between India and the rest of the world. The Desk would cater to enquiries both from the members and non-members of ICC and would act as the single window for business matchmaking.

== Initiatives ==
=== Ladies Study Group ===
In 1966, the Indian Chamber of Commerce set up the Ladies Study Group (LSG), to create a platform that encourages women to mobilize their talents and help them participate in issues related to social development.

=== 'Anandadhara' — West Bengal State Rural Livelihoods Mission ===
ICC through West Bengal State Rural Livelihoods Mission with active participation of the local panchayats, is promoting many poverty eradication initiatives in the rural areas, such as women empowerment schemes, sustainable agricultural initiatives, Swasthya Sathi (a health insurance) scheme, and West Bengal boasts of having the lowest NPA in the self-help groups (SHGs) portfolio in the country where eight lakh such units are operating.

=== India Energy Summit ===
The India Energy Summit is an annual and flagship initiative of ICC.

=== Corporate Governance and Sustainability Vision Awards ===
ICC organizes the India Corporate Governance & Sustainability Vision Summit every year to recognize and honor their enormous endeavor towards creating a Sustainable development model for the society at large, to various Indian businesses.

=== PSE Excellence Awards ===
Indian Chamber of Commerce, since 2010, to acknowledge the game changers who have contributed immensely in shaping up the Indian economy and congratulate them for their contribution under two sections – Maharatnas & Navratnas and Miniratnas & Others.

=== Green Urja And Energy Efficiency Awards ===
Indian Chamber of Commerce has come up with The Green Urja and Energy Efficiency Awards with an aim to have accelerated deployment for clean energy transition to contribute to "Clean Energy Transition for Sustainability and GHG Emission Reduction.

== ICC Calcutta Foundation ==
The Foundation, which is the Chambers trust body was formed with the objective of promoting the well-being of Calcutta and in that context, funds various projects to bring about a change in the quality of urban life.

== See also ==
- Federation of Indian Chambers of Commerce & Industry
- Confederation of Indian Industry
- ASSOCHAM
