= Sapru =

Kashmiri Pandit surname

Sapru, also spelled as Sipru or Saproo is a Kashmiri Pandit clan and surname native to the Kashmir Valley of Jammu and Kashmir, India.

== Notable people ==
- Tej Bahadur Sapru, lawyer, political and social leader
- Muhammad Iqbal a poet, philosopher and politician.
- D.K. Sapru (Daya Krishen Sapru), commonly referred as Sapru, noted character actor of Hindi film, in 1960s–1970s.
- Tej Sapru, Hindi film and television actor, son of D.K. Sapru.
- Jagdish Narain Sapru, prominent businessman
- Reema Sapru, Bollywood film writer, director and producer
- Rahul Sapru, first-class cricketer playing for Uttar Pradesh
- Jatin Sapru, TV sports journalist, television host, broadcaster and cricket commentator.
- Priti Sapru, actress known for her works in Punjabi and Hindi cinema
- Sheikh Abdullah and family, politicians
- Somnath Sapru, prominent journalist, editor, media consultant and historian

== See also ==
- Kashmiri Hindus
