= Harrisons Malayalam =

Indian agricultural business corporation pvt ltd

- Type: Public
- Traded as: NSE: HARRMALAYA; BSE: 500467
- Headquarters: Kochi, Kerala, India
- Parent: RPG Group
- Website: harrisonsmalayalam.com

Harrisons Malayalam is an Indian agricultural business corporation, based in Kochi, Kerala and a part of the RPG Group. It has a history that goes back to over 150 years. It cultivates between 14,000 ha – 26,000 ha (information varies) of its own land, and processes products from other farmlands in its neighbourhood.

In addition to banana, cardamom, cocoa, coffee, coconut, pepper, and vanilla, its primary products are rubber, tea, and pineapple. Harrisons Malayalam is the largest producer of pineapples in India, the largest producer of tea in South India, and is the largest employer in the region. In 2021 the company is awarded 6th rank in Great Place to Work in India, and 16th rank in Great Place to Work Asia.

== History ==
In 1907, United Kingdom-based Harrisons & Crosfield established Malayalam Plantations Ltd. in South India. In 1983, 34% of Malayalam Plantations were sold to Indian nationals, leaving Harrisons with 40%. The following year, Malayalam Plantations merged with Harrison & Crossfield's other interests in India to form Harrisons Malayalam. It was acquired by the RPG Group in 1988, and Sanjiv Goenka was the chairman. When the RPG Group's businesses were divided between the two brothers Sanjiv and Harsh, the assets of Harrisons Malayalam were vertically split and put under two separate management teams. Sanjiv continued as chairman of the existing company, and Harsh got control of the demerged unit Harmony Plantations.

The company has 13 tea estates and 11 rubber estates, and rubber factories at Suryanelli (tea) Kumbazha (rubber) and Achoor. It employs around 13,000 people in rural Kerala, and more than 100,000 people are dependent on the company for their livelihood.
