= KEC International =

Indian electricity transmission tower manufacturing company

KEC International Limited
- Type: Public
- Traded as: NSE: KEC; BSE: 532714
- Industry: Transmission towers, Distribution, Railways, Solar, Civil & Cables
- Founded: 7 May 1945; 81 years ago (as Kamani Engineering Corporation)
- Founder: Ramji H. Kamani
- Headquarters: Worli, Mumbai, Maharashtra, India
- Key people: Harsh Goenka (chairman); Vimalkumar Kejriwal (MD & CEO); Rajeev Aggarwal (CFO)
- Revenue: ▲₹17,282 crore (US$1.8 billion) (FY23)
- Operating income: ▼₹830 crore (US$89 million) (FY23)
- Net income: ▼₹176 crore (US$19 million) (FY23)
- Number of employees: 40,251 (March 2022)
- Parent: RPG Group
- Subsidiaries: SAE Towers
- Website: www.kecrpg.com

KEC International Limited (Kamani Engineering Corporation) is an Indian multinational company and also India's second largest manufacturer of electric power transmission towers and one of the largest Power transmission, Engineering, Procurement and Construction (EPC) companies in the world. It is headquartered in Mumbai, India and is part of the ₹255 billion (US$2.7 billion) RPG Group, engaged in EPC works for power transmission, distribution, railways, cables, solar, civil and smart Infrastructure. It has operations in the regions of India, SAARC, EAP, Africa, Middle East, and the Americas.

== History ==
Ramjibhai Kamani founded Kamani Engineering Corporation (now KEC International) on 7 May 1945 which became the first electric power transmission company in Asia. It was engaged in the field of electric power transmission and railway electrification. In 1950, the company received an order from the Indian government to supply transmission towers for the Bhakra Nangal Dam project and a steel tower fabrication plant was established in Bombay in partnership with R. Foures, France. This was augmented by a second unit in Jaipur, Rajasthan and by 1967, KEC was supplying three-fifths of India's demand for transmission towers.

By the 1970s, KEC had carried out turnkey power transmission projects in Iran, Iraq, Kuwait, Saudi Arabia, Sudan, Egypt, Nigeria, Algeria, Mauritius, Indonesia, Malaysia, Thailand, The Philippines, Australia, New Zealand, Brazil, the United States, and Canada. With eighty percent of its turnover of almost ₹800 million (US$8.5 million) being earned through exports, KEC soon became the largest manufacturer of transmission towers in India and the second largest in the world, next in rank to SAE of Italy.

=== Acquisition by the RPG Group ===
KEC accumulated heavy financial debt during the 1973 oil crisis and the 1979 energy crisis both of which adversely affected international transactions conducted in US Dollars as world crude oil prices quadrupled. The company struggled but was bound to completing its project commitments. This resulted in the company incurring heavy losses. Financial institutions such as IDBI (Industrial Development Bank of India) had invested some ₹230 million (US$2.5 million) in KEC and began to worry when KEC's financial reports showed a record loss of ₹44 million (US$470,000). They began to press for "professional management".

Around this time, Texmaco, a K.K. Birla company began to show interest in KEC, but their bid to control the company was frustrated and they backed away. Financial institutions stepped in and appointed their nominees to take over control from the Kamani family. The company soon began to limp back to profitability as KEC's sales climbed from ₹200 million (US$2.1 million) in 1972 to ₹550 million (US$5.9 million) in 1982.

R. P. Goenka, chairman of the RPG Group had been vying for KEC shares for a long time. Even after financial institutions stepped in, some members of the Kamani family continued to hold a small number of shares in the company. Goenka carefully maneuvered to purchase these shares making sure that he did not get trapped in the same pitfalls that had defeated the Birla's attempts to take over KEC. Shareholding negotiations and approvals from financial institutions were sought before the company was put up for court auction by the government.

=== 2005-present ===
On 18 March 2005, KEC International Limited was incorporated in the Ministry of Corporate Affairs, India.

In March 2010, RPG Cables was merged with KEC International.

In September 2010, KEC International acquired Houston, Texas based SAE Towers, a group of operating companies incorporated in the United States, Mexico and Brazil consolidated through SAE Towers Holdings, LLC. This acquisition created the largest steel lattice tower manufacturer in the world with approximately 300,000 tons of annual production capacity.

In 2017, the Company's Water Business was merged with the Civil Business. The Civil Business now undertakes turnkey construction for Residential, Industrial and Commercial projects, including workshops.

In 2019, KEC International Ltd received orders worth ₹1,520 crore across three business verticals.

On 26 July 2024, the company reported a 108% jump in net profit to ₹87.6 crore for the April-June quarter (Q1FY25) compared to ₹42 crore a year ago.

The company secured new orders worth ₹1,422 crore for transmission and distribution projects in India and the United States.

A high-voltage transmission line order for 765 kV and 400 KV lines in India from Power Grid is among the new projects. KEC will supply substation structures for projects in the US.

In January 2026, the company secured orders worth ₹1,050 crore, including a 100+ MW wind power project in southern India.

== Operations ==
The company currently is in the following major business areas:

- Power Transmission & Distribution
- Railway Infrastructure
- Civil
- Smart Infrastructure
- Cables & Cabling Solutions
- Solar

The company has manufacturing facilities in Nagpur, Jabalpur, Jaipur (Tower and Steel Structurals), Vadodara and Mysore (Cables).

== Employees ==
As of 31 March 2022, the KEC International Limited has a total of 40,251 employees, including 9,114 permanent employees.
