= AMW =

AMW may refer to:

- America's Most Wanted
- America's Most Wanted (professional wrestling)
- Andrew Mountbatten-Windsor
- ASCII Media Works
- Asia MotorWorks, a Heavy commercial vehicle manufacturer in India
