= Hariram Goenka =

Indian businessman

Rai Bahadur Sir Hariram Goenka CIE (3 June 1862 – 28 February 1935) was a noted businessman from Calcutta. His father Ramchandra Goenka was from a Marwari family which hailed from Dundlod in Rajputana. Hariram was one of the scion of original Goenka group, which he founded with his younger brothers, Sir Badridas Goenka and Ghanshyam Das Goenka of which the current R P Goenka group is one of the spun-off branch. He was first person from Marwari community to be knighted. He was sole agent for many British houses like Rallis Brothers apart from leading broker for many textile and jute mills.

In later years of his life, he along with his brothers bought Hukumchand Jute Mills form Seth Hukumchand to start their entry as mill owners from agents and family later expanded into other businesses varied as steel tea to power plants. His statue stands at Curzon Park and there is street named after him, Hariram Goenka Street located in Burrabazar in Kolkata.
