= Lakshmi Niwas Birla =

Businessman from India (1909 – 1994)

Lakshmi Niwas Birla (11 July 1909 – 29 August 1994) was one of the scions of Birla family and a noted Industrialist, philanthropist, writer and art connoisseur.

He was the eldest son of Ghanshyam Das Birla and his first wife Durgadevi. He was later adopted by Jugal Kishore Birla. He was married to Sushila Devi and had one son Sudarshan Kumar Birla from marriage born in 1934.

He served as president of Indian Chamber of Commerce in 1951 and the Federation of Indian Chambers of Commerce & Industry for year 1967.

He wrote many books in English and Hindi and was also noted art connoisseur.

He donated monies to build Hindu temples. The idols of Hindu temple at Durban had been bought out of his donations.

He established Birla High School also called as Hindi High School in the year 1941.
