= North East Business Summit =

Indian annual business summit

- Status: Defunct
- Genre: Conference
- Frequency: Annually
- Country: India
- Inaugurated: 2002
- Most recent: 16 November 2017
- Participants: Business leaders, government ministers and leaders, investors
- Organiser: Indian Chamber of Commerce

The North East Business Summit was an Indian annual flagship event to promote investment and business opportunities in the North Eastern part of India.

The event was jointly organized by the Indian Ministry of Development of North Eastern Region, Government of India and the Indian Chamber of Commerce.

== History ==
The event was organized for the first time in 2002 in Mumbai.

| Summit | Venue | Date |
|---|---|---|
| 1st | Mumbai | 19 and 20 July 2002 |
| 2nd | New Delhi | 20 and 21 January 2004 |
| 3rd | New Delhi | 10 and 11 April 2007 |
| 4th | Guwahati | 15 and 16 September 2008 |
| 5th | Kolkata | 8 and 9 January 2010 |
| 6th | Mumbai | 21 and 22 January 2011 |
| 7th | New Delhi | 6 and 7 January 2012 |
| 8th | New Delhi | 9 and 10 January 2013 |
| 9th | Dibrugarh | 22 and 23 November 2013 |
| 10th | | |
| 11th | New Delhi | 9 and 10 March 2017 |
| 12th | New Delhi | 16 and 17 November 2017 |
