= R. P. Goenka =

Indian industrialist (1930–2013)

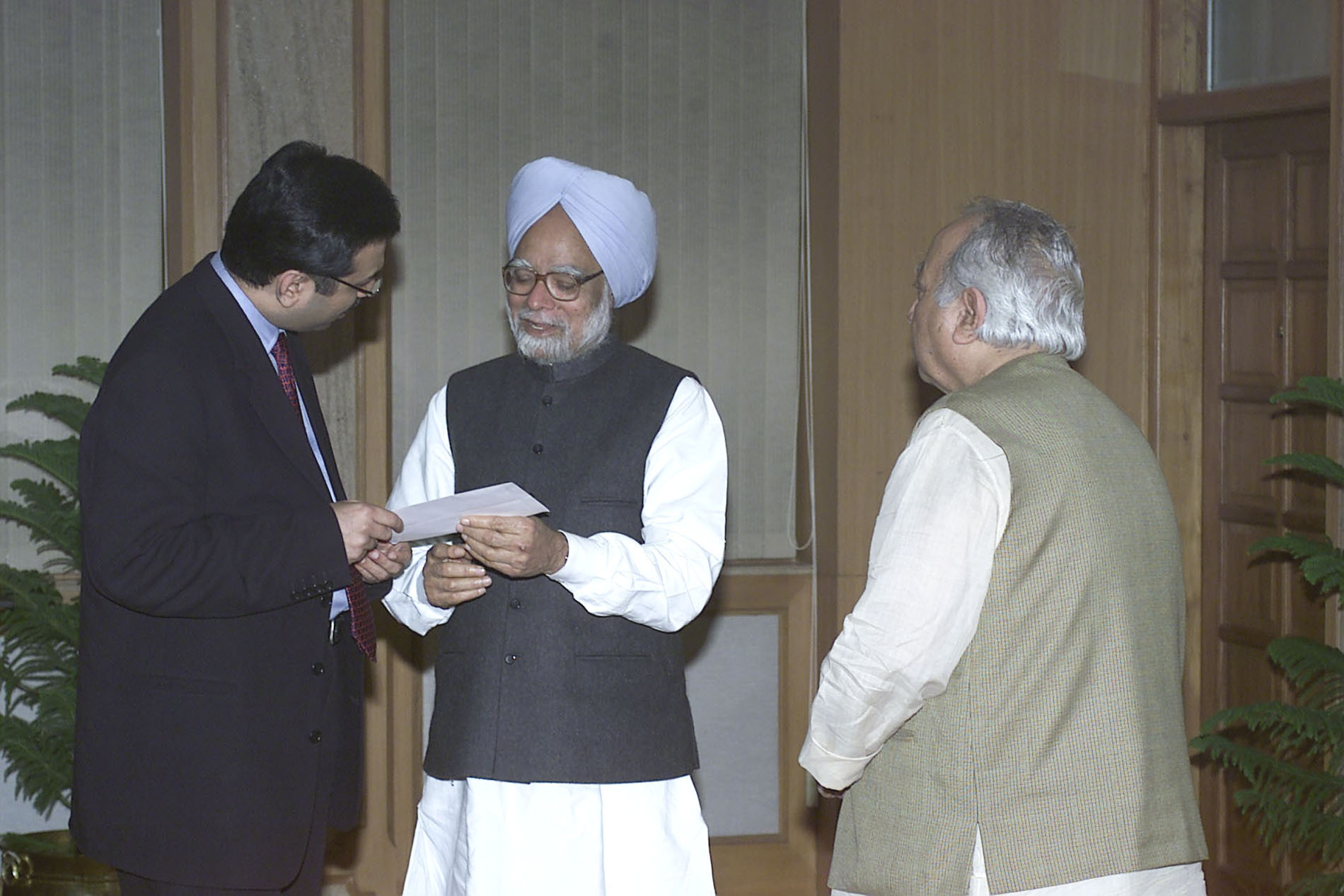
- R.P. Goenka (right) and Sanjiv Goenka (left) of RPG Enterprises presenting a cheque of ₹ 1 crore to the Prime Minister, Manmohan Singh (centre), towards the Prime Minister's National Relief Fund in New Delhi, 2005.
- Born: 1 March 1930; Calcutta, British India
- Died: 14 April 2013 (aged 83); Calcutta, West Bengal, India
- Education: Presidency College, Kolkata (then affiliated to University of Calcutta); Harvard University
- Occupations: Industrialist, Founder, Chairman Emeritus RPG Group
- Children: Harsh Goenka; Sanjiv Goenka
- Father: Keshav Prasad Goenka

Rama Prasad Goenka (1 March 1930 – 14 April 2013) was the founder and chairman Emeritus of the RPG Group, a multi-sector Indian industrial conglomerate. Born in 1930, he was the eldest son of Keshav Prasad Goenka and grandson of Badridas Goenka, the first Indian to be appointed Chairman of the Imperial Bank of India (now the State Bank of India). His two younger brothers were Jagdish Prasad and Gouri Prasad. On Keshav Prasad Goenka's death, his businesses were split between the three brothers. Rama Prasad Goenka (better known as RP Goenka), established RPG Enterprises in 1979.

He attended Presidency College of University of Calcutta in his home town of Kolkata and Harvard University in the United States. He was a Member of Parliament in the Rajya Sabha, or upper house, of the Indian Parliament. Goenka was the chairman of the Board of Governors of International Management Institute and a trustee of the Jawaharlal Nehru Memorial Fund, the Indira Gandhi Memorial Trust and the Rajiv Gandhi Foundation. He was the president of the FICCI and the immediate past chairman of the Board of Governors of the Indian Institute of Technology in Kharagpur. He once served as trustee of Tirupati Temple. Goenka was twice awarded the Order of the Sacred Treasure by the Emperor of Japan.

Through a series of mergers and acquisitions including the likes of Dunlop India and CESC in 1980, CEAT Tyres in 1982, RPG Life Sciences (then Searle India) and KEC International in 1985, the Gramophone Co. of India (now Saregama) in 1986, Spencers and Harrisons Malayalam in 1988, Bayer India, Firstsource Solutions Limited in 2012 and many more, R. P. Goenka came to be known as the 'takeover king' in his heyday. He was accused of asset-stripping of existing enterprises, especially the Kamani Engineering Corporation, and siphoning off the money into the RPG group, leaving the acquired firms bereft of cash and heavily in debt.

Goenka died on 14 April 2013 in Kolkata. He has two sons, elder Harsh Vardhan and younger Sanjiv.

The Goenka family belongs to the Marwari community of money-lenders and tradesmen, and hailed originally from Dundlod village in Rajasthan. As early as the 19th century, an enterprising member of the family, Ramdutt Goenka, set up base in Kolkata, which was then the capital of India, and a major commercial hub of the British Empire. The family prospered in its traditional vocations of money-lending and trade. It was in the 1970s that Rama Prasad Goenka (b.1930) leveraged the family's wealth to take over a variety of industries and corporations and thus created a ready-made business conglomerate. Many of these corporations were stressed due to the socialistic policies and the "License Raj" then prevalent in India, and others were marked by the disagreements within the families of their owners. In a series of takeovers, RPG acquired such companies relatively cheaply and used his financial resources and business acumen to make them viable. In this way, by the end of the 20th century, RPG had cobbled together a significant business empire. The Goenka business empire is remarkable for two things: first, none of their major ventures were founded by them, but all were takeovers of existing companies owned by other families or corporations; and second, the resultant diversity and incoherence of these companies.
