= Sudarshan Kumar Birla =

Indian industrialist

Sudarshan Kumar Birla or S. K. Birla (born 1934) is an Industrialist, and a senior member of Birla family. He heads the S. K. Birla group, which once consisted of several companies like DIGJAM, Digvijay Woolen Mills, Mysore Cement, Birla Eastern, Nabin Industries, Xpro India. He is son of Lakshmi Niwas Birla and eldest grandson of G. D. Birla. While he continues to hold the controlling stake in S K Birla group, he passed the charge of group to his son Sidhharth Birla in 2010. He served as the President of the Federation of Indian Chambers of Commerce & Industry for year 1990.
