= Jeewanlal Motichand Shah =

Jeewanlal Motichand Shah (1881–1971) was a noted Gandhian and an industrialist, who was co-founder of Mukund Limited. He was the father of Viren J. Shah.

== Early life ==
Jeewanlal was born to Motichand Pethraj Shah in year 1881 in a Gujarati family based in Calcutta. He was married to Jayaben with whom he had a son, Viren born in 1926.

== Business career ==
=== Aluminum utensils factory ===
Jeewanlal started his business career in 1912, as a dealer of aluminium utensils but soon started an aluminium utensils factory, in his name Jeewanlal & Company. Later he expanded business and established a large factory in 1917 at Belur the products of which were sold under very popular "CROWN" brand. He very soon became established and noted industrialist of Calcutta. He helped Ramjibhai Kamani, get established in town in his early years who began his business career by selling Jeewanlal's aluminium utensils in 1912. Kamani later became one of the leading industrialist of his time. Jeewanlal and Kamani also later joined hands to supply aluminium sheets to Tatas. They became close associate of Tatas. Jhaverchand Meghani, often referred to as 'National Poet' worked in Jeewanlal's aluminium factory at Belur during the years 1918–1921.

=== Mukund Steel ===
Both Jeewanlal and Kamani were close associates of Mahatma Gandhi in Calcutta and were highly influenced by him. Gandhiji advised Jeewanlal to do away with the aluminium utensils business, as eating, cooking food in aluminium utensils was poisonous, and he should be involved in this if he believed in his philosophy.

Meanwhile, Jeewanlal came in contact with Rai Bahadur Jagmal Raja, who was in town for building Bally Bridge - through their common friends - Devram bhai and Lirabhai Raja. Jeewanlal informed Jagmal Raja, that he wished to do away with the aluminium utensils production business, as per advice of Gandhiji and was looking for other business opportunities. Jagmal Raja, who was an established industrialist having glass and ceramics factories at Bombay, Derol and Allahabad, learned that Lala Mukund Lal was willing to sell his iron mill at Lahore. He informed both Jeewanlal and Gandhiji about this opportunity. But for takeover of the business. they needed more capital than they were able to muster together. Gandhiji, therefore, persuaded his another close follower, Jamnalal Bajaj to put money into buying Mukund Steel jointly with Jeewanlal from Lala Mukund Lal, who also was Gandhian. The duo finally purchased Mukund Steel in 1937. Jeewanlal along with Ramjibhai Kamani managed the affairs of the Mukund Steel for ten years from 1937. Jeewanlal was offered shares in all Bajaj group companies, which he declined and retired from active business around 1950, while Jamnalal had already died in 1942. Mukund Steel lost Lahore mill during partition and they decided to set up new plant in Kurla, which was successfully implemented in 1948. The partnership, stood firmly over the period of time and successive generation and Mukund Limited, is still jointly run by descendants of Jamnalal Bajaj and Jeewanlal. Viren Shah, his son, later served for many years as the Chairman of Mukund.

=== Sale of aluminum factory ===
Jeewanlal, after getting firmly established with Mukund Steel business, sold his aluminum business to Canadian partners in 1940, although company name remained Jeewanlal (1929) Limited. another noted Gujarati industrialist from Calcutta, Rai Bahadur Himchand K. Shah became the director of the firm after the sale.

== Retirement ==
After retirement, Jeewanlal settled down in his native place at Chorwad in Saurashtra to run a farmhouse. Incidentally, Chorwad is also the hometown of Dhirubhai Ambani, another prominent industrialist. Jeewanlal donated large portion of his assets and monies for freedom struggle.

== Philanthropy ==
J.M Vinay Mandir School in Chorwad was founded by him.

== Death ==
He died in 1971.
