= Chorwad =

- Town
- Location in Gujarat, India Chorwad (India)
- Coordinates: 21.0167°N 70.2333°E
- Country: India
- State: Gujarat
- District: Junagadh

Population (2001)
  - Total: 21,196

Languages
  - Official: Gujarati, Hindi
- Time zone: UTC+5:30 (IST)
- Vehicle registration: GJ-11
- Website: gujaratindia.com

Chorwad or Chorvad is a town and a municipality in Junagadh district in the state of Gujarat, India. It lies on the coast of the Arabian Sea.

== Etymology ==
It is said to have derived its name from being a notorious haunt of pirates.

== History ==
Since the earliest times, Chorvad has been famous for its betel gardens, and the flavour of Chorvad betel is supposed to be very superior, and it is largely exported not only inland but also by sea. Chorvad was in ancient times a dependency of Mangrol.

In later times, i. e. after the collapse of the Mughal power in the Saurashtra peninsula, it was seized on by the Raizadas, but we have no record of the exact date of such seizure; but Sanghji or Singhji, the Raizada Garasia of Chorvad, took an active part in the internecine wars of the nineteenth century; but he was killed in the battle of Malia fought between him and Aliya Hatti, and his descendants were much embarrassed as to how they should defray the arrears of the soldiery. As Rana Sultanji of Porbandar State was connected by marriage with the deceased Singhji, his relatives in 1787 entrusted the fort and town to him on condition that he should defray the demands of the Sipahis. The Rana agreed and took possession of the town and then his commandant of this town captured Veraval. This caused a general insurrection against the Nawab along the coast, and Sutrapada also rebelled. But in the course of a short time Veraval was recovered and Chorvad also was conquered in 1788. Mokaji, the chief Raizada Garasia, was permitted to retire with his family to Dhoraji on this occasion under the protection of Jadeja Kumbhoji of Gondal State. So Chorvad became a khalsa (crown) domain of the Junagadh State.

== Demographics ==
The population according to the 1872 census was 2818 souls, but this fell to 1299 after the severe famine of 1878–79. As of 2001 India census, Chorvad had a population of 21,196. Males constitute 52% of the population and females 48%. Chorvad has an average literacy rate of 50%, lower than the national average of 59.5%; with male literacy of 62% and female literacy of 38%. 12% of the population is under 6 years of age.

== Places of interest ==
There are some images here in a patch of forest called the Jhund or Chorvadi Mata. Chorvad beach is also popular. It is located near the Chorvad Palace.

== Notable people ==
- Dhirubhai Ambani – industrialist and founder of Reliance Industries
- Rajesh Chudasama – politician
- Jeewanlal Motichand Shah – industrialist with Mukund Ltd.
- Viren Shah – industrialist with Mukund Ltd. and Governor of West Bengal (1999–2004)
- Shyam Pathak – Indian actor and comedian
