= Alwyn Didar Singh =

Alwyn Didar Singh PhD
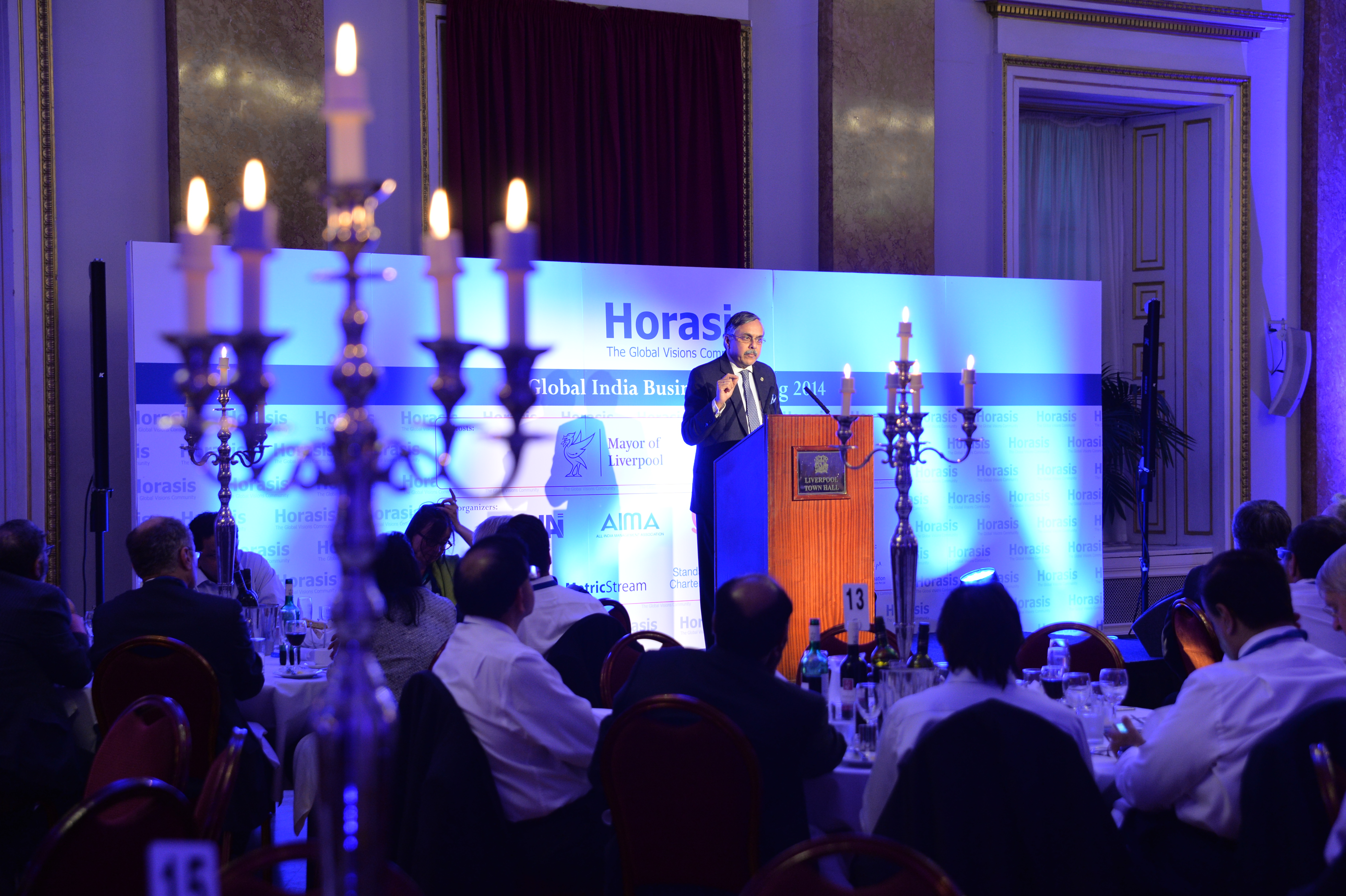
- Didar Singh in 2014
- Education: University of Birmingham
- Employer: FICCI

Alwyn Didar Singh is a former Indian civil servant and former secretary general of the Federation of Indian Chambers of Commerce and Industry (FICCI).

== Education ==
He graduated from the University of Birmingham with a master's degree in development administration in 1996. In addition, he holds a PhD on the policy and administration of e-commerce from Panjab University, Chandigarh. He is an alumnus of St. Stephen's College, Delhi.

Alwyn Didar Singh was awarded the honorary degree of Doctor of the University (DUniv) by Birmingham University in 2014.

== Career ==
Singh was appointed secretary general of the Federation of Indian Chambers of Commerce and Industry (FICCI) in 2012 and served till August 2017.

Singh was secretary to the Government of India in the Ministry of Overseas Indian Affairs from 2009 to 2011. He was finance member for the National Highways Authority of India from 2007 to 2009. He has served as joint secretary in the Government of India's Ministry of Heavy Industries and also worked in the Ministry of Commerce with responsibilities for foreign trade.

He is currently the advisor for Bridge India, a progressive non-profit think tank set up in London in 2019.
