= Rajan Mittal =

Indian businessman

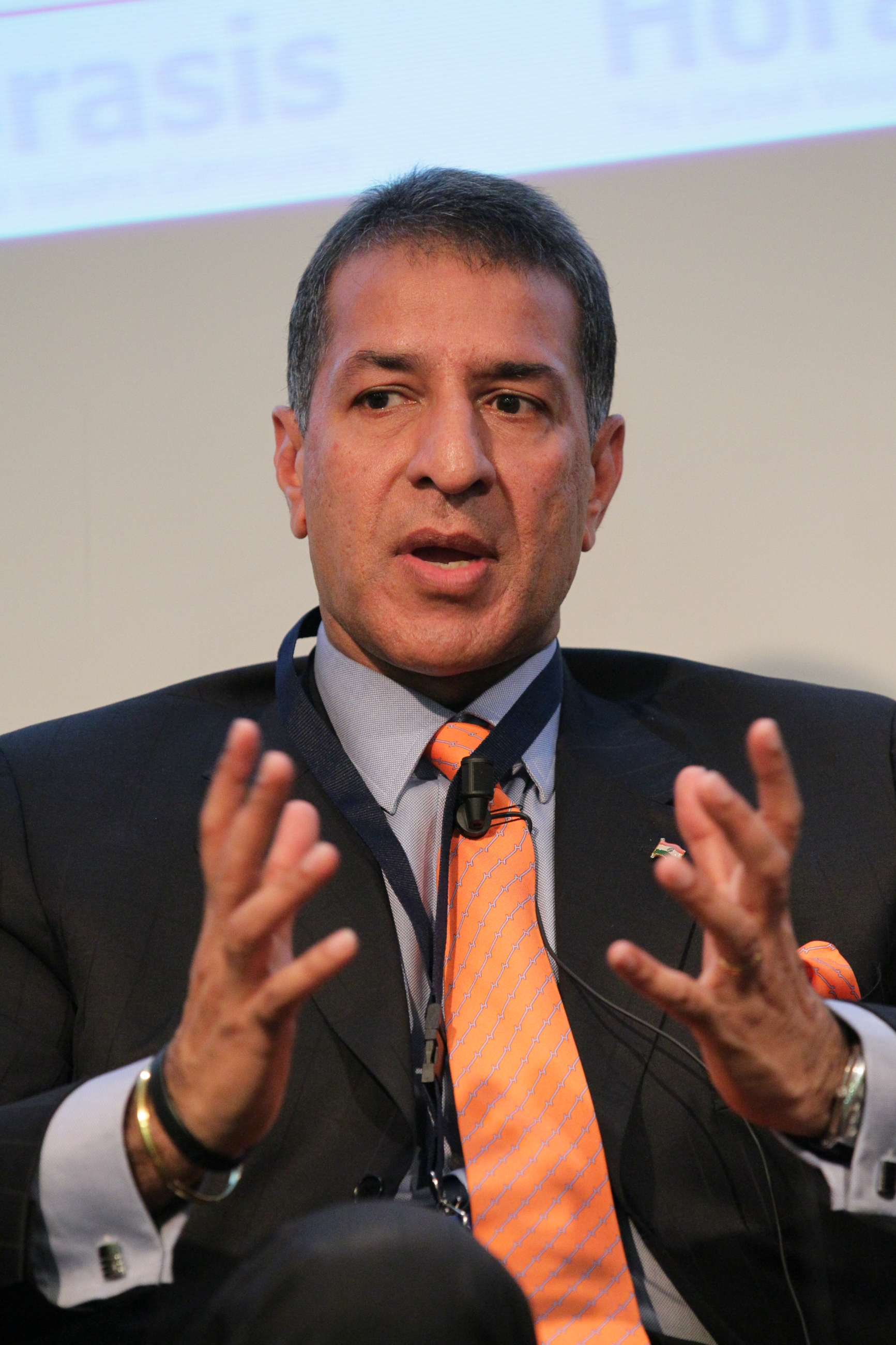
Rajan Bharti Mittal at Horasis Global India Business Meeting 2011

Rajan Bharti Mittal (born in 1960) is a first-generation Indian entrepreneur serving as vice chairman and managing director of Bharti Enterprises.

Rajan graduated from Punjab University and completed his master's at Harvard Business School. Rajan Bharti Mittal, along with his brothers Sunil and Rakesh, set up Bharti Enterprises, an import business, in 1980.

Rajan was honored with the "Indian Business Leader of the Year Award" in 2011 by Horasis. In the same year, he was also awarded the "Leonardo International Prize" by Comitato Leonardo.

Rajan is on the Board of Trustees of Brookings Institution, President of ICC (International Chamber of Commerce) in India. In 2009–2010, he was the president of FICCI (Federation of Indian Chambers of Commerce and Industry) and serves on its Executive and Steering Committees. Rajan is married and has two sons.
