= Seniority (company) =

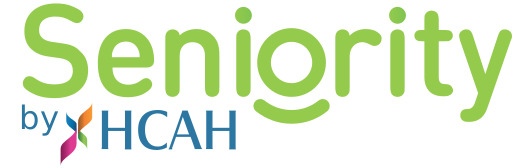
- Website type: E-commerce
- Available in: English
- Founded: 2016
- Headquarters: Pune, India
- Area served: India
- Founders: Ayush Agrawal, Tapan Mishra
- Services: Online shopping
- Website: www.seniority.in
- Commercial: Yes
- Current status: Active

Seniority is a Pune (India) based retail company. Founded by Ayush Agrawal, and Tapan Mishra, Seniority provides health and lifestyle products for senior citizens in India.

== Investment and Revenue ==
The company raised an early-stage investment of US$1 million in 2017 from RPG Ventures, the venture capital arm of the RPG Group. The same group has invested US$6 million in Seniority till 2019. The company offers mobility aids, wellness products and lifestyle or leisure products In 2017, the company reported a revenue of INR 1 crore per month. The company reported 500 percent growth in 2018.

Seniority has partnered with Ezymov, a wheelchair taxi and ambulance service in Mumbai. and it Store partnership at ReLiva Physiotherapy and Rehab

In November 2022, Seniority was acquired by Out-of-hospital care provider HCAH. The terms of the acquisition were not disclosed.

== Awards and recognition ==
- Limca Book of awards for the largest gathering of senior citizens doing yoga all at once at International Yoga Day
