= Raychem RPG =

Manufacturing company

- Type: Corporate group
- Industry: Conglomerate
- Founded: 1989; 37 years ago
- Key people: Rajesh Ganesh(CFO & Interim CEO)
- Website: www.raychemrpg.com

Raychem RPG is a company established in 1989. It is a joint venture between TE Connectivity, based in the United States, and RPG Enterprises, based in India. The company works in innovative technologies and engineering solutions.

It specialises in manufacturing and providing energy-to-infrastructure solutions, ranging from cable accessories, surge arresters, electrical safety, solar products, earthing and lightning solutions to specialized transformers and grid connectivity components. Raychem RPG has developed engineering solutions and technologies for energy such as the 23 MVA, 30-pulse Converter Duty Oil-Filled Transformer for use in Oil & Gas applications. Raychem RPG was the first in India to build a 1MW microgrid using diesel, solar and energy storage at a Central Electronics Limited (CEL) site. Raychem RPG is also the first Indian manufacturer to indigenously develop and manufacture a 145kV dry type termination in India and has completed the Pre-Qualification (PQ) test protocols at Central Power Research Institute (CPRI) for its 245KV cable accessories manufactured in India.

Raychem RPG is involved in India’s Electrical, renewable energy and infrastructure projects and focuses on manufacturing in India, technology use, system reliability and solar connectivity solutions.

Raychem RPG is headquartered in Thane, Maharashtra, India with registered office in Worli, Mumbai, India. The company operates multiple manufacturing and engineering facilities across India, including plants in Vasai, Naigaon, Chakan, Halol & Poland supporting domestic supply and exports.

Raychem RPG has contributed to society in Health and Community Support by collaborating with the Akshaya Patra Foundation for mid-day meals, Women Empowerment by enabling skill development for women and Education and Skill Development by improvements at residential schools.

Raychem RPG has built rainwater harvesting ponds and surrendered its borewells to the Central Groundwater Authority (CGWA) to reduce groundwater usage. This shows its strong commitment to sustainable water management.

== Awards ==
- Golden Peacock Awards in Innovation and Engineering 2020
- TPM Excellence Awards by JIPM, Japan 2020
- Best Stall award at ELECRAMA 2025
