= Shyamal Kumar Sen =

Indian politician

Hon'ble Justice Shyamal Kumar Sen
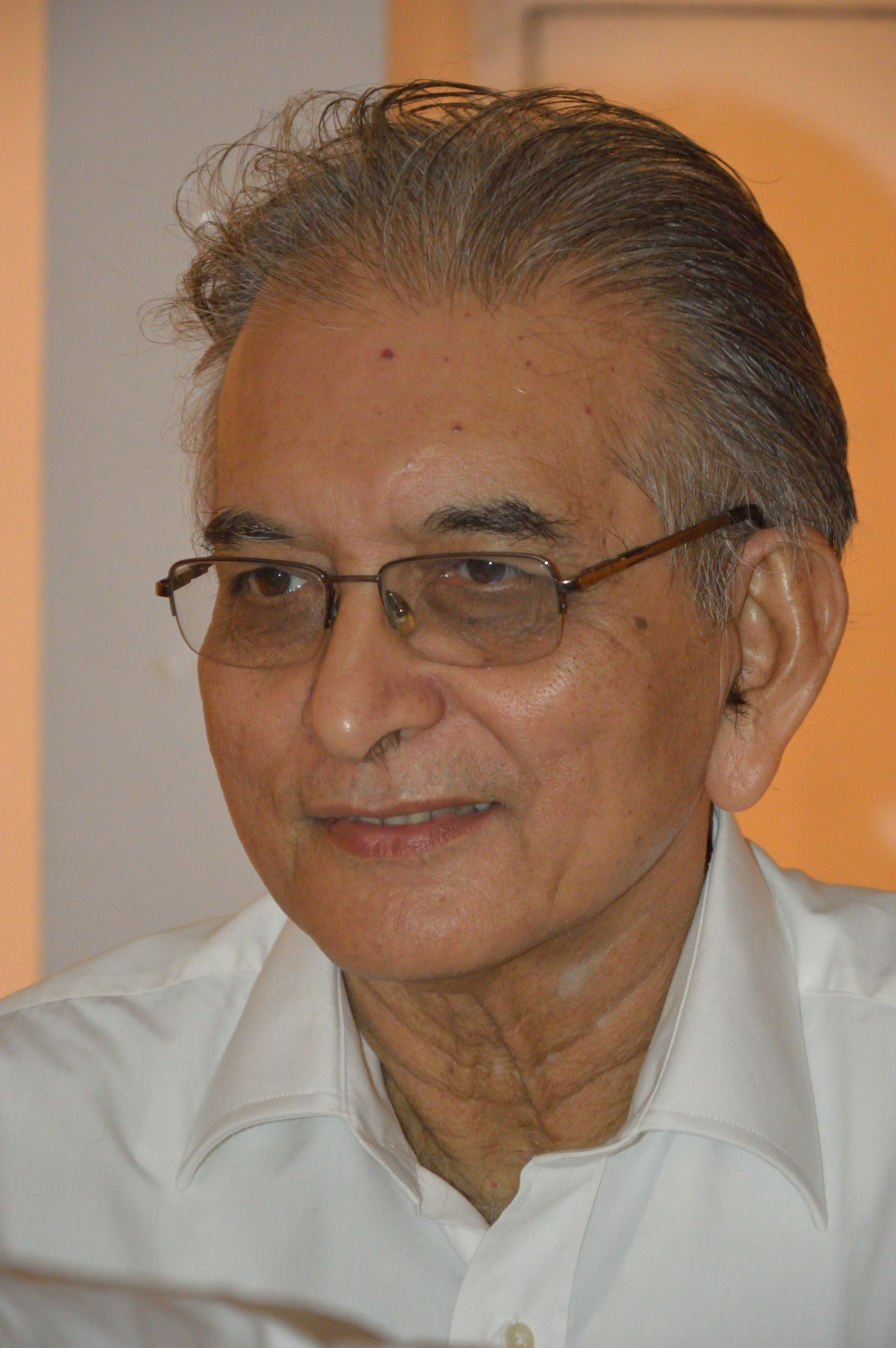
- Justice Shyamal Kumar Sen at the Academy of Fine Arts, Kolkata.

16th Governor of West Bengal
- In office 18 May 1999 – 4 December 1999
- Preceded by: Akhlaqur Rahman Kidwai
- Succeeded by: Viren J. Shah

37th Chief Justice of Allahabad High Court
- In office 18 July 2000 – 24 November 2002
- Preceded by: Nirendra Krishna Mitra
- Succeeded by: Tarun Chatterjee

Acting Chief Justice of Allahabad High Court
- In office 8 May 2000 – 17 July 2000
- Preceded by: Daya Saran Sinha

Judge of Allahabad High Court
- In office 8 May 2000 – 17 July 2000

Acting Chief Justice of Calcutta High Court
- In office 5 December 1999 – 21 December 1999
- Preceded by: S. B. Sinha
- Succeeded by: Ashok Kumar Mathur
- In office 29 April 1999 – 17 May 1999
- Succeeded by: S. B. Sinha

Judge of Calcutta High Court
- In office 17 February 1986 – 7 May 2000

Personal details
- Born: 25 November 1940 (age 85) Kolkata, West Bengal, India
- Education: Scottish Church College; University of Calcutta

Shyamal Kumar Sen (born 25 November 1940) is an Indian jurist who served as a chief justice of the Allahabad High Court and also as a Governor of West Bengal. He was appointed governor in May 1999 following the resignation of A R Kidwai and served until December 1999.

== Early life ==
After graduating from the Scottish Church College, he studied law at the University of Calcutta.

== Career ==
He had worked as a lecturer in the commercial and industrial laws in the City College, Kolkata (under the University of Calcutta) from 1964 to 1971, as well as in the faculty of law at the University of Calcutta from 1971 to 1985. He was elevated as a permanent judge of the Calcutta High Court in February 1986. He served as chief justice of the Allahabad High Court on 18 July 2000.

He served as the Governor of West Bengal from May to December 1999.

== Awards ==
- Banga Bibhushan: 2018
