= Rajiv Gandhi Foundation =

Indian non-profit organisation

- Founded: 21 June 1991; 35 years ago
- Type: Charitable Institution (exemption status): 80(G)
- Purpose: Education, Disability, Natural resource management, Libraries
- Headquarters: New Delhi
- Location: Jawahar Bhawan, Dr. Rajendra Prasad road, New Delhi, India
- Region served: India
- Method: Direct Implementation, Grant Making, Working with Partner Organizations
- Key people: Sonia Gandhi, Chairperson; P. Chidambaram, Trustee; Rahul Gandhi, Trustee; Priyanka Gandhi Vadra, Trustee
- Website: www.rgfindia.org

The Rajiv Gandhi Foundation was established on 21 June 1991, on the advise of NRI., Vikram Bajwa , who was Vice- President of Indian National Congress of America. He wrote a Letter to PSG Vincent George who forwarded it to Dr. Manmohan Singh, then Finance Minister of India.The foundation works on a wide range of issues stretching from development of knowledge, to health, disability, authorization of the destitute, livelihoods and natural resource management. Its current focus areas are community welfare, literacy, health and special programmes for children and women. All donations to the foundation are tax deductible to the extent of 50 percent under section 80G of the Income Tax Act.

The foundation is headed by Sonia Gandhi, who is also the leader of the Indian National Congress Party. In October 2022, ministry of home affairs cancelled the Foreign Contribution (Regulation) Act, 2010 license of Rajiv Gandhi foundation over allegations of violation of laws.

== History ==
The Rajiv Gandhi Foundation was set up to carry forward the legacy of former Prime Minister of India Rajiv Gandhi. The Jawahar Bhawan Trust, led by Sonia Gandhi met in July, 1991 and passed a resolution inviting the foundation to work in the Jawahar Bhawan.
The foundation constituted a group of 8 founding Trustees. They were Dr. Shankar Dayal Sharma, Sonia Gandhi, Rahul Gandhi, Priyanka Gandhi, Amitabh Bachchan, Suman Dubey, N.K. Seshan and Sunil Nehru. In 1992, P. V. Narasimha Rao, P. Chidambaram, V. Krishnamurthy, Sam Pitroda, Dr. Sekhar Raha, Mani Shankar Aiyar, Montek Singh Ahluwalia and R. P. Goenka were also inducted as Trustees.

== Rajiv Gandhi Institute for Contemporary Studies (RGICS) ==
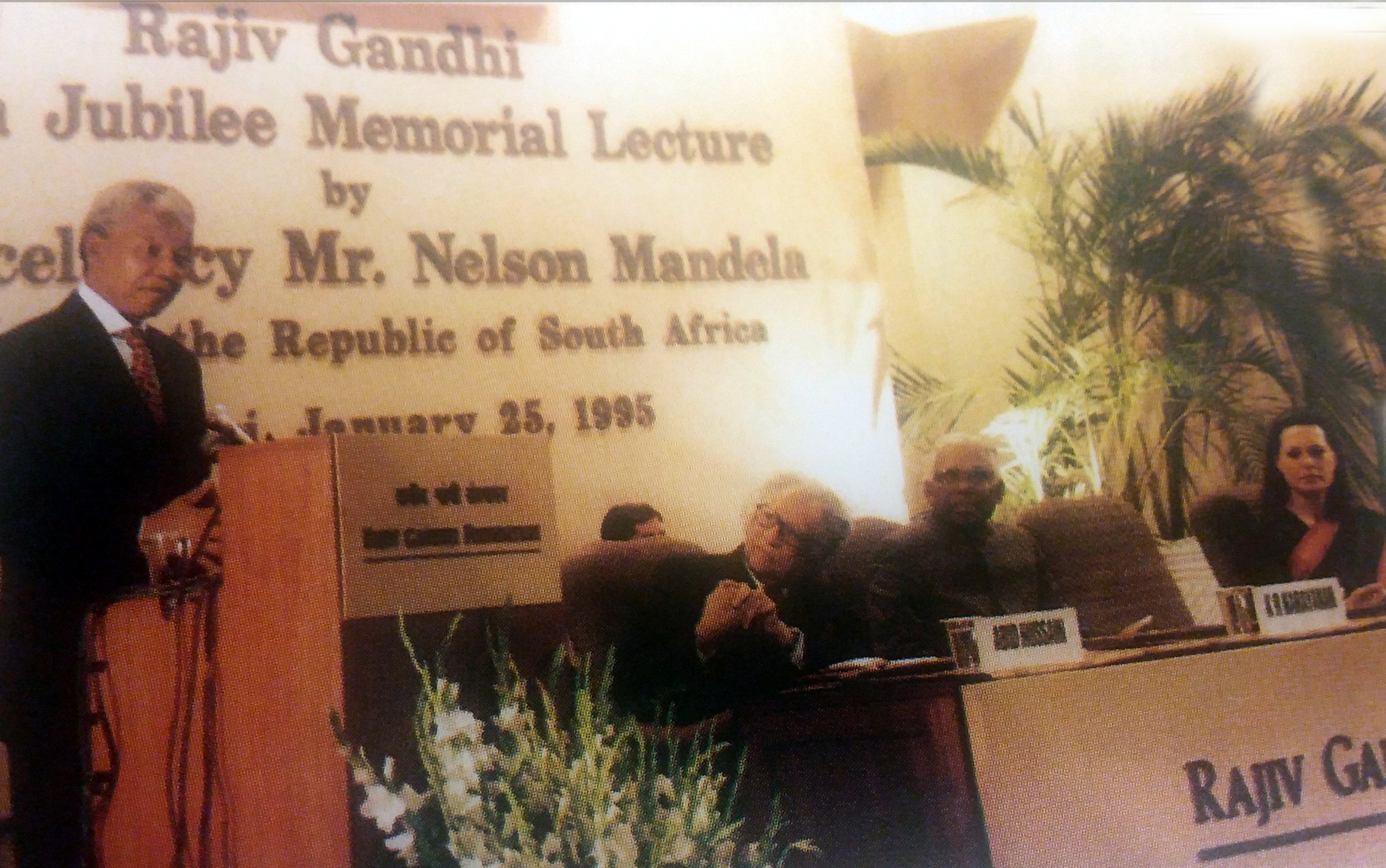
Nelson Mandela speaking at the Rajiv Gandhi Memorial Lecture

In August 1991, the foundation setup Rajiv Gandhi Institute for Contemporary Studies (RGICS) to provide research based ideas, analysis, policy and practical programmes into contemporary problem. RGICS programmes cover economic reform, science and technology, social problem, public affairs and international relations. The Institute organizes conferences, lectures, workshops, short studies and projects and invites experts to lend their insight into the contemporary issues. It also encourages research scholars, scientists, economists and social scientists to undertake projects which can provide inputs towards policy framing and decision making. Some of the speakers include Robert McNamara, Nelson Mandela, Hillary Clinton, and Edward Said.

== Initiatives taken ==
=== Education ===
- In the Yakutpura slum area of Hyderabad where 400 Muslim girls were enrolled into schools in collaboration with Mahita, a local agency.
- In 2007–08, the foundation launched Vidyagyan scholarship program in collaboration with the Sri Sivasubramaniya Nadar Educational and Charitable Trust in select districts of Uttar Pradesh. It focused on very poor Muslim and lower caste girl children in classes 6 to 10. Around 1500 girl children in classes 6 to 9 were supported through this scholarship programme.
- Indira Gandhi Rashtriya Uran Akademi scholarship is given to two women pilot trainees at the institute every year.
- Traveling scholarships to students from various British universities were given to visit India during their vacations as part of undergraduate or graduate studies.
- The Teachers Empowerment Programme was initiated to provide extensive training in the District Institute of Education & Training (DIET), Titabor in Jorhat district in Assam. It was also extended for school teachers of Mizoram, Meghalaya, Manipur and Nagaland.
- Decentralization of Education Governance was launched in 2010. It is a way to devolve power systematically to primary stake holders empowering them to participate in the decision-making process, and structurally alter the process of planning and decision making within the entire education system.

=== Health ===
- In 1993, RGF launched an HIV/AIDS prevention awareness campaign India. On Worlds AIDS Day in 2009, Sonia Gandhi, chairperson of the foundation, flagged off Red Ribbon Express. Over the years, the foundation has partnered with a number of organizations and conducted workshops for General Medical practitioners and NGOs to create awareness on how to prevent and control AIDS.
- In 2012, RGF have conducted 800 heart surgeries with the help of AGS charity and then congress leader's.

== Ongoing initiatives ==
=== Access to opportunities ===
The foundation enables physically challenged young people to access better opportunities by awarding motorised vehicles.

=== Natural resource management ===
The Rajiv Gandhi Foundation has been working on issues of livelihoods and Natural Resource Management since 2001. This programme was implemented in backward villages in Jaipur, Pali and Karoli districts of Rajasthan which faced serious environmental degradation. A third party evaluation revealed the significant impact in the lives of the targeted families. In order to scale up this transformative work, RGF set up Gram Gaurav on 19 December 2011. Gram Gaurav currently works in 74 villages located in Dang region of Karauli and Dholpur districts to augment water resources, conserve soil and enhance agriculture production.

=== Rajiv Gandhi Cambridge Scholarship ===
The foundation, in collaboration with Cambridge Commonwealth Trust offers two scholarships for Indian students to pursue MPhil and LLM at the University of Cambridge.

=== Libraries ===
Since 1993, the foundation has set up 1648 libraries in villages and slums across 22 states in India. In 2013, RGF partnered with Bill and Melinda Gates Foundation and worked with the public libraries in Barabanki and Rai Bareilly districts of Uttar Pradesh. It plans to open a library in each village of India.

== Controversies ==
=== Diversion of Funds from the Ministry of Finance ===
In 1991, Manmohan Singh the then Minister of Finance had tried to allocate the foundation a sum of 100 crore rupees. The Budget Speech of 1991–92 by Manmohan Singh presented on July 24, 1991, has the detail.

"As a homage to the late Shri Rajiv Gandhi and in support of the laudable objectives of the foundation, Government has decided to contribute Rs 100 crore to the foundation at the rate of Rs 20 crores per annum for a period of five years beginning from the current year," the then Finance Minister said in the Budget speech.

After huge political uproar, the decision was overturned. In the subsequent discussions that followed, Manmohan Singh had read a letter from the Rajiv Gandhi Foundation, that stated that the foundation appreciates the generous sum but it thinks that the government should itself invest the funds in suitable projects.

=== Diversion of Funds from the Prime Minister's National Relief Fund ===
The UPA government led by Congress has also been accused of diverting funds from Prime Minister's National Relief Fund to the foundation while members of the Gandhi family and other senior Congress leaders sat on both board.

In 2005-6 and 2007–8, while Congress led UPA was in power, it received funds from several ministries, public sector banks and PSUs.

It have also been criticised for receiving funds from Sonia Gandhi led PMNRF, a fund set up by public donations.

=== Donations from Zakir Naik ===
In September 2016, the ruling Bharatiya Janata Party (BJP) alleged that the Rajiv Gandhi Foundation had received donations from Zakir Naik in 2011 despite the government having had expressed security concern with regard to Naik's TV channel. Later, a congress spokesperson claimed that the Rs 50 lakhs were returned.

=== Donations from the Chinese government ===
In June 2020, the BJP accused the Rajiv Gandhi Foundation of accepting a donation of $300,000 from the Chinese government during 2005-06 and questioned whether it was a “bribe” for lobbying for a free trade agreement between India and China which, according to Ravi Shankar Prasad, lead to a 33% increase in trade deficit between India and China under the congress government.

== Investigations ==
=== Inter-Ministerial Committee ===
In 2020, Ministry of Home Affairs set up an inter-ministerial committee headed by the special director of the Enforcement Department to coordinate investigation into violation of various legal provisions of PMLA, Income Tax Act, FCRA and other provisions by the Rajiv Gandhi Foundation along with the Rajiv Gandhi Charitable Trust and the Indira Gandhi Memorial Trust. The committee will consist of the representatives from the Ministry of Home Affairs, Enforcement Directorate, Central Bureau of Investigation and Income Tax Department.

In 2022, the Rajiv Gandhi Foundation's Foreign Contribution Regulation Act (FCRA) licence has been revoked by the Central Government.
