= Ajit Narain Haksar =

Indian businessman (1925–2005)

- Born: 11 January 1925; Gwalior, India
- Died: 19 May 2005 (aged 80)
- Occupation: Industrialist
- Organization: ITC Limited

Ajit Narain Haksar (11 January 1925 – 19 May 2005) was the first Indian chairman of ITC Limited and on retirement was voted the Chairman Emeritus of the company. He has received the Lifetime Achievement in Management Award from All India Management Association (AIMA), 'Outstanding Industrialist Award' and the 'Udyog Rattan Award.' He is recognized for leading ITC's transformation into a company with a stronger Indian identity than a foreign one. He was the first Indian to go to Harvard University

== Early life ==
Ajit Narain Haksar was born on 11 January 1925 in Gwalior into a Kashmiri Pandit family. He was educated at the Doon School and subsequently at Allahabad University. He then did an MBA at Harvard Business School.He was the first Indian to go to Harvard University

== ITC ==
Haksar joined ITC in 1948 as a trainee in Marketing, and was rose to become the marketing director in 1966. By 1968, Haksar was made deputy chairman and was then instated as chairman in 1969. He retired from ITC in 1983 after 34 years with the company, and was succeeded by his brother-in-law, Jagdish Narain Sapru. Haksar was known as the chairman who first took ITC out of purely the tobacco industry and into hotels and paperboards.

== Other endeavours ==
In 1977, Haksar founded the ITC Sangeet Research Academy, a Hindustani classical music academy located in Kolkata, India. The academy has played a significant role in the revival and preservation of India's rich musical heritage.

In 1995, he founded the EMPI Business School Group, New Delhi, and served as the founder patron chairman till his death.

== Personal life ==
He was married to Mrs. Madhuri Haksar, with whom he had a daughter and a son.

== Autobiography ==
- Autobiography, Bite the Bullet: Thirty-four Years with ITC, New Delhi, India: Viking, Penguin Books India, (1993) 536 p. ISBN 0-670-85319-4
