= Ramji H. Kamani =

Indian businessman (1888–1965)

Ramji Hansraj Kamani
- Born: 21 February 1888; Dhari village, Baroda State, British India
- Died: 27 June 1965 (aged 77); Bombay, India
- Occupation: Industrialist
- Years active: 1917–1965
- Known for: Founder of Jaipur Metal Industries Limited (1942) (Jaipur Metals & Electricals Limited); Kamani Metals & Alloys Limited (1944); Kamani Engineering Corporation Limited (1945); Kamani Metallic Oxides Private Limited (1951); Kamani Tubes Private Limited (1959); Indian Rubber Regenerating Company Limited (1960); Industrial Jewels Limited (1963)
- Spouse: Jadavlaxmi
- Children: Poonamchand, Rasik, Sarla, Navin, Nalini, Hasmukh, Navnit, Chandravadan, Mridula
- Parent(s): Hansraj and Dudhima

Ramji Hansraj Kamani (Gujarati: રામજી હંસરાજ કમાણી; 21 February 1888 – 27 June 1965) also called Ramjibhai, was an Indian entrepreneur and industrialist born in the village of Dhari in the Amreli district of Saurashtra, Baroda State. He was the patriarch of the Kamani group companies.

In June 1920, Ramjibhai joins Mahatma Gandhi's Non co-operation movement. He later communicates with Gandhi during his stint in jail.

Nicol Road, a street in the Ballard Estate business district of Mumbai where the company office, Kamani Chambers is located, was rechristened Ramjibhai Kamani Marg in his honor.

== Entrepreneurship ==
Ramjibhai Kamani pioneered many firsts for the Indian industrial sector, electric power transmission being one, the others being production of various derivatives of non-ferrous metals and alloys for use in specialized industrial applications viz. arsenical copper plates, cupronickel sheets and production of lead oxide and zinc oxide. Kamani Engineering Corporation (KEC) also manufactured a unique and innovative road roller with the trade name Tractmount — the design created a light-weight standalone road roller which could be easily transported in a truck and could be mounted on by a tractor for use at its destination. Several were sold all over India especially in hilly and mountainous areas where it would otherwise be difficult to lug a full-sized road roller up steep mountain roads.

Ramjibhai Kamani founded Kamani Engineering Corporation (KEC) in 1945 which became the first electric power transmission company in Asia and a pioneer in the field of electric power transmission and railway electrification. In 1950, the company received an order from the Indian government to supply transmission towers for the prestigious Bhakra Nangal Dam project and a steel tower fabrication plant was established in Bombay in partnership with R. Foures, France. This was augmented by a second unit in Jaipur, Rajasthan and by 1967, KEC was supplying three-fifths of India's demand for transmission towers.

By the 1970s, the Kamani group as it came to be known, consisted of seven companies with several manufacturing units in Bombay, Bhavnagar and Jaipur, and doing business in varied fields ranging from metals to rubber and chemicals to jewel bearings not to mention power, in both national and global markets.

By the 1970s KEC had carried out turnkey power transmission projects in various countries across the globe. With eighty per cent of its turnover of almost ₹800 million (US$8.3 million) being earned through exports, KEC soon became the largest manufacturer of transmission towers in India and the second largest in the world, next in rank to SAE of Italy.

KEC accumulated heavy financial debt during the 1973 oil crisis and the 1979 energy crisis both of which adversely affected international transactions conducted in US Dollars as world crude oil prices quadrupled. Completing its project commitments while incurring heavy losses and unable to clear its debts, the company was auctioned by the Maharashtra government in 1982 for recovery of dues and was acquired by the RPG Group and in 1984, renamed KEC International.
