= CEAT Limited =

Indian tyre company

- Formerly: Cavi Elettrici e Affini Torino
- Type: Public
- Traded as: BSE: 500878; NSE: CEATLTD
- Industry: Tires & Tubes
- Founders: Virginio Bruni Tedeschi
- Key people: Harsh Goenka (chairman); Anant Goenka (vice chairman); Arnab Banerjee (MD & CEO)
- Revenue: ▲₹11,963 crore (US$1.2 billion) (2024)
- Operating income: ▲₹894 crore (US$93 million) (2024)
- Net income: ▲₹635 crore (US$66 million) (2024)
- Total assets: ▲₹9,994 crore (US$1.0 billion) (2024)
- Total equity: ▲₹4,052 crore (US$420 million) (2024)
- Number of employees: ~8,000
- Parent: RPG Group

CEAT Limited is an Indian multinational tyre manufacturing company owned by the RPG Group. It was established in 1924 in Turin, Italy, and acquired by RPG Group in 1982. CEAT produces over 48 million tyres a year and manufactures them for cars, two-wheelers, trucks, buses, light commercial vehicles, earth-movers, forklifts, tractors, trailers, and auto-rickshaws. The current capacity of CEAT tyres plants is over 800 tonnes per day. The company has manufacturing plants in Halol, Butibori, Bhandup, Nashik, Ambernath, and Chennai.

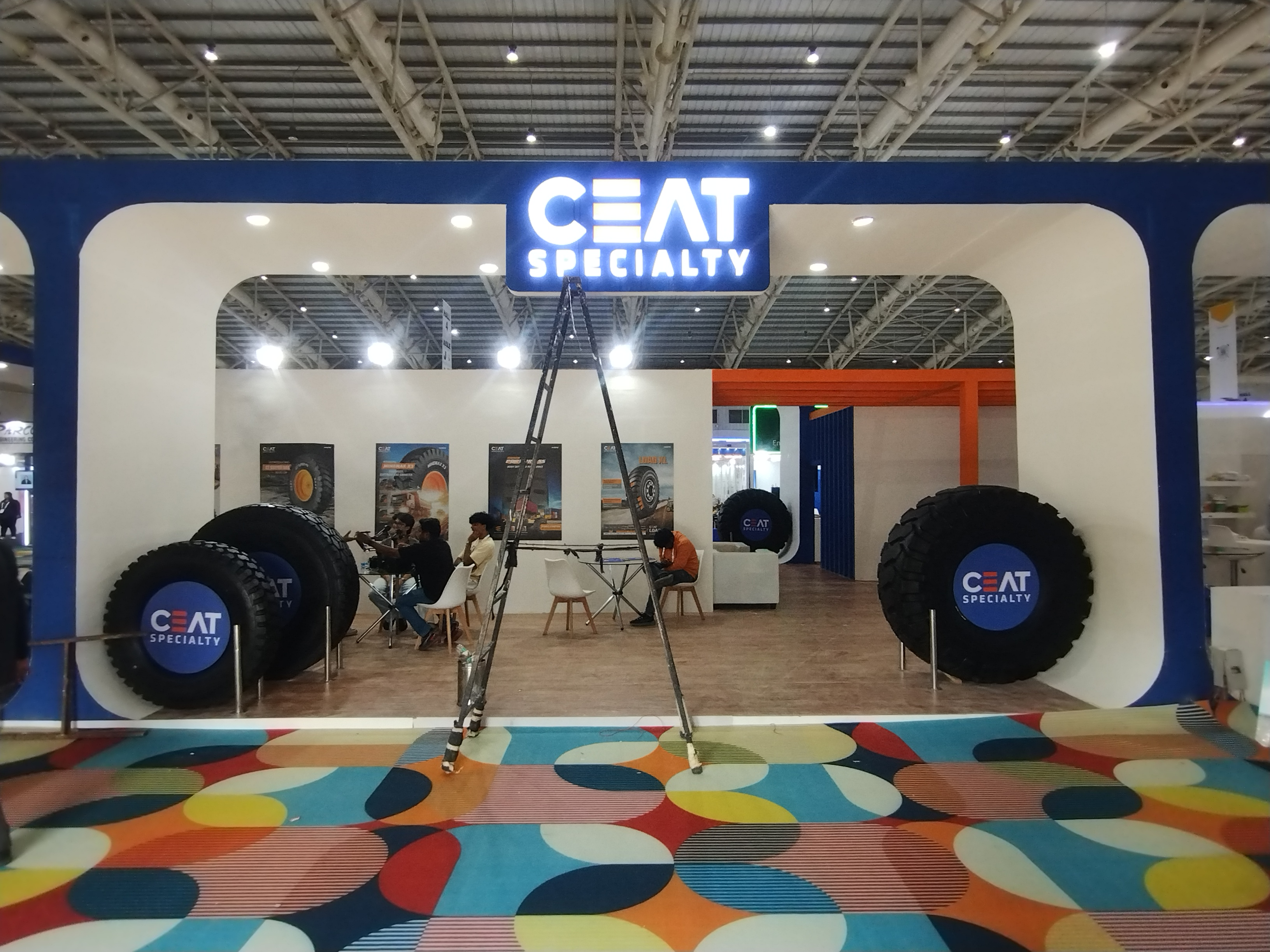
CEAT at EXCON 2025, BIEC

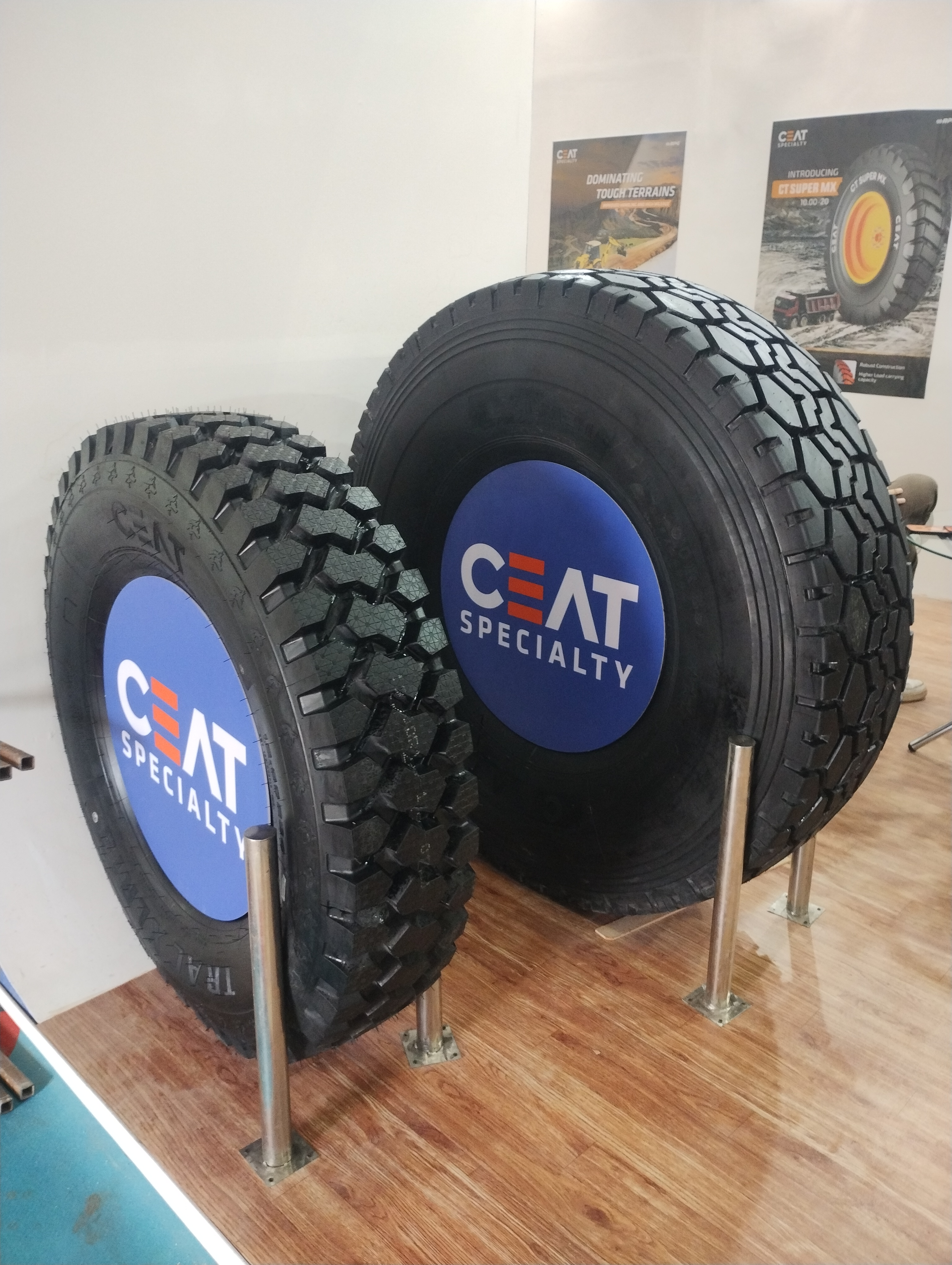
CEAT Specialty Tyres at EXCON 2025, BIEC

== History ==
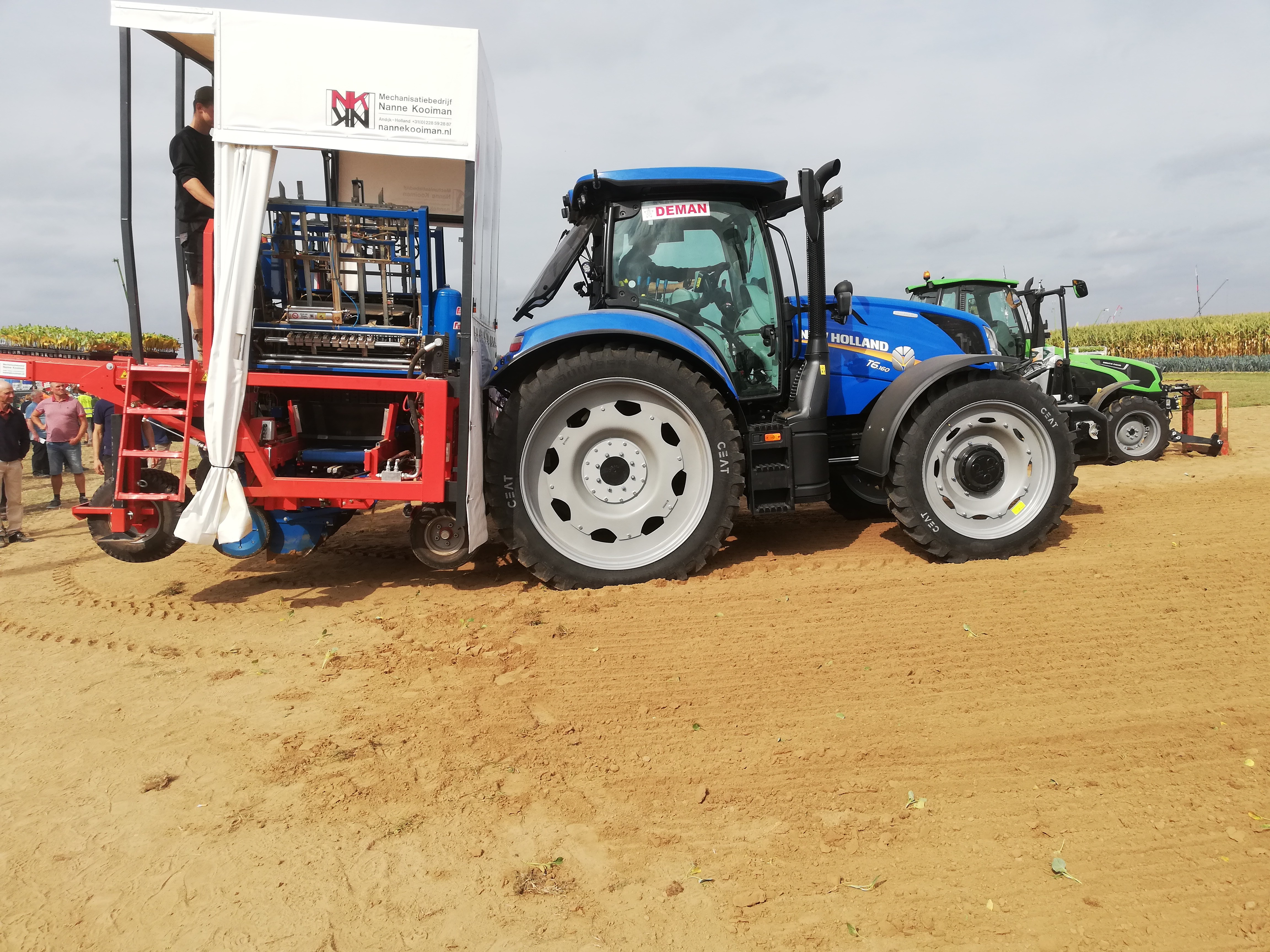
Ceat tires at a tractor in Belgium

The company was founded as Cavi Elettrici e Affini Torino (Electrical Cables and Allied Products of Turin) by Virginio Bruni Tedeschi in 1924, in Turin, Italy. On 10 March 1958, the company was incorporated as CEAT Tyres of India, in Mumbai. Initially, the company collaborated with the Tata Group. In 1972, the company set up a research and development unit at Bhandup in Maharashtra. In 1981, Deccan Fibre Glass Limited was merged with the company.

In 1980, Alberto, son of Virginio, sold the Cavi Elettrici e Affini Torino to investment firm SOFIT, which went on to cut jobs. Oweing to it, in 1981, the company failed in Italy and Pirelli purchased the right to the CEAT name, which it sold to RPG Group in 1983.

In 1982, RPG Group acquired the company, and in 1990, the company was renamed as CEAT. In 1993, the company collaborated with Yokohama Rubber Company, to manufacture radial tyres at their Nashik unit. In 1999, CEAT formed a joint-venture, named as CEAT Kelani, with Asia MotorWorks (AMW) and Kelani Tyres, to manufacture and market CEAT tyres in Sri Lanka. in 2006, CEAT Kelani commissioned their first Sri Lanka–based radial-tyre manufacturing unit in Kalutara. In 2009, AMW exited the joint-venture. In 2020, a new radial tyre factory was set up near Chennai with the initial investment of INR 14000 crore. The factory produces and supplies passenger car radial and two-wheeler radial tyres. The company exports across Asia, America and Europe.

== Products ==
CEAT manufactures tyres for various types of vehicles like heavy commercial vehicles, light commercial vehicle, off-highway tyres, passenger cars, tractors, motorcycles and scooters, cycles and SUVs. It exports Asia.Under the luxury segment in India, CEAT's products include the high-performance CEAT SportDrive and CEAT SportDrive SUV, which allow for enhanced control and more comfort. For motorcycles, CEAT's SportRad tyre focuses on high speed. The CrossRad tyre, on the other hand, facilitates riding in diverse terrains. The SecuraDrive range serves the premium hatchback and Sedan categories; and the SecuraDrive SUV serves the compact SUV segment. In 2022, CEAT launched an all-terrain tyres range called CrossDrive for SUVs.

CEAT's custom-built tyres were used in the sci-fi action film Kalki 2898AD for the futurist 6-tonne car Bujji.

== Sponsorships and Events ==
In 2024, CEAT partnered with German football club Bayer 04 Leverkusen and became the official tyre partner for the next two seasons, until 2026. CEAT is the title Sponsor for the Indian Supercross Racing League (ISRL), which brings riders from all over the world together to compete in a variety of formats and categories. CEAT organised the Cricket Rating Awards in 2023 and awarded domestic and international cricket players (both male and female). The awards were given based on the CEAT cricket rating in June 2022-May 2023.

CEAT is the bat sponsor of cricketers, Rohit Sharma, Shreyas Iyer, , Yashasvi Jaiswal, and Harmanpreet Kaur. Currently CEAT sponsors the strategic-timeout for the Indian Premier League (IPL) and Women's Premier League (WPL).

CEAT also launched an off-road training program, called 'Enduro', that aimed to train and improve the riding skills of enthusiasts who would want to participate in competitions.

== Deming Prize ==
The company is the first tyre company to win the Deming Prize (awarded in 2023)

== Awards ==
- Sword of Honor award by British Safety Council (Awarded to Chennai and Ambernath plant)
- Lighthouse Certification by World Economic Forum (awarded to Halol plant)

== Anti competition practices ==
In April 2022, the Competition Commission of India raided the headquarters of CEAT along with other tyre companies like Apollo Tyres, MRF (Madras Rubber Factory), and Continental Tyres at multiple locations. Earlier in February the antitrust watch dog had released a statement about fining these tyre companies a total of Rs 1788 crores (of which CEAT fined Rs 252.16 cr.) for sharing price-sensitive information among themselves to manage their cartelization of tyre prices for supplies to the public transport corporation of Haryana state. Earlier, the All India Tyre Dealers Federation had complained to the Ministry of Corporate Affairs about this cartelization of these companies to increase the tyre prices. The ministry had then referred the case to the CCI.
