= Somnath Sapru =

Somnath Sapru (21 January 1940 - 28 January 2022) was an Indian journalist, editor, media consultant and historian. His books dealt primarily with the history of Indian aviation and armed services. He occupied the positions of resident editor in The Pioneer and The Indian Express.

== Personal life ==
Sapru was born on 21 January 1940 in Srinagar, in the Kashmir Valley of the erstwhile princely state of Jammu and Kashmir within British India, into a Kashmiri Pandit family. He lived most of his life outside his native Kashmir. Sapru was educated at Madras University in Chennai.

Sapru died on January 28, 2022 at his Bose Garden residence in Bangalore, Karnataka, a week after his 82nd birthday.

== Work ==
Over his journalistic career, he has been employed as a defence correspondent with the Deccan Herald, a resident editor of The Indian Express in Madras, and as the editor of The Pioneer. In 1979, while editor of The Pioneer, he received a Jefferson Fellowship. In 1987, he received the Press Foundation of Asia-Mitsubishi Award for "Asian Journalist of the Year" (awaiting citation).

Since retirement, Sapru has written several books. Skyhawks, published in 2006, is about the four men who were the first Indians to fly military aircraft, while serving in the First World War. According to a reviewer, "many Indian aviation historians have generally given the topic a wide berth for it was really a time well before the growth of aviation in India and was even further removed from the beginnings of the Indian Air Force". The book is described as reflecting "an enormous amount of research ... (where) there was hardly any material or documentation available either in the IAF's archives or the Defence Ministry's records, as this narrative pertains to an era even before the Royal Air Force." Combat Lore: The Indian Air Force, 1930–1945 takes "the reader through the birth pangs of the Indian Air Force and provides a riveting account of its 'growing-up' years."

== Bibliography ==
- Transnational News Agencies & National Media Policies (Mysore University, 1979).
- The News Merchants: How They Sell News to the Third World (Dialogue Press, 1986).
- Pax Japanica: An Exposition Of Indo-Japan Relations (Batra Publications, New Delhi, 1990).
- Witness to the Century: Writings of C.S. Venkatachar, ICS (ed.)
- Lost Shangri-La (DK Printworld, 2001), about the antique past and cultural heritage of Kashmir. Decent Books. ISBN 8186921176, 9788186921173.
- Skyhawks: India's Debut in Military Aviation (Writers' Workshop, Kolkata, 2007), a history of the first Indian pilots enrolled in the Royal Flying Corps during the First World War. ISBN 81-8157-512-1
- Armed Pegasus: The Early Years (Knowledge World Publishers, 2012), a history of the origins of established military aviation in India.
- Combat Lore: Indian Air Force 1930–1945 (Knowledge World Publishers, 2014), a history of the Indian Air Force during the Second World War.
