= Jagdish Narain Sapru =

Indian businessman

- Born: November 16, 1933; Allahabad, United Provinces, British India
- Died: May 8, 2007 (aged 73); Kolkata, West Bengal, India
- Education: Allahabad University
- Occupation: businessman
- Known for: Chairman of ITC Limited, Nicco Park, Indian Chamber of Commerce, BOC India, Tollygunge Club
- Spouse: Gita
- Children: 2
- Relatives: Tej Bahadur Sapru (Grandfather)

Jagdish Narain Sapru (16 November 1933 – 8 May 2007) was an Indian businessman. He was the former chairman of ITC Limited, BOC India, DIC India (Formerly Coates of India), Nicco Park, and the Indian Chamber of Commerce.

He was also the president of the Tollygunge Club, a golf club in Kolkata. Sapru was voted as one of the 'CEOs who Rock' by Asia Africa Intelligence Wire in 2003 and was also an honorary fellow of the All India Management Association. He was the grandson of Indian lawyer, political, and social leader Sir Tej Bahadur Sapru.

== Early life ==
Jagdish Narain Sapru was born on 16 November 1933 in Allahabad (in the Indian state of Uttar Pradesh) to a Kashmiri Brahmin family. He was educated at the Allahabad University where he achieved an M.A. in Economics.

== Career ==
Sapru joined ITC as a 'sales pupil' in 1955. In the mid '60s, he was posted in Calcutta (now Kolkata), and eventually made his permanent home there. He joined the board in 1974, and became chairman in 1983, succeeding his brother-in-law Ajit Narain Haksar. In his tenure as chairman, Sapru was responsible for ITC diversifying into the agriculture sector. He retired from ITC in 1991.

== Family life ==
Sapru was survived by his wife Gita, two sons, Nirukt and Rakesh, daughters-in-law Abha and Sonya, and three grandchildren Abhirukt, Mihika and Sarojini. He was a keen golfer and cricketer.
