= Viren J. Shah =

Indian politician (1926–2013)

Viren Shah
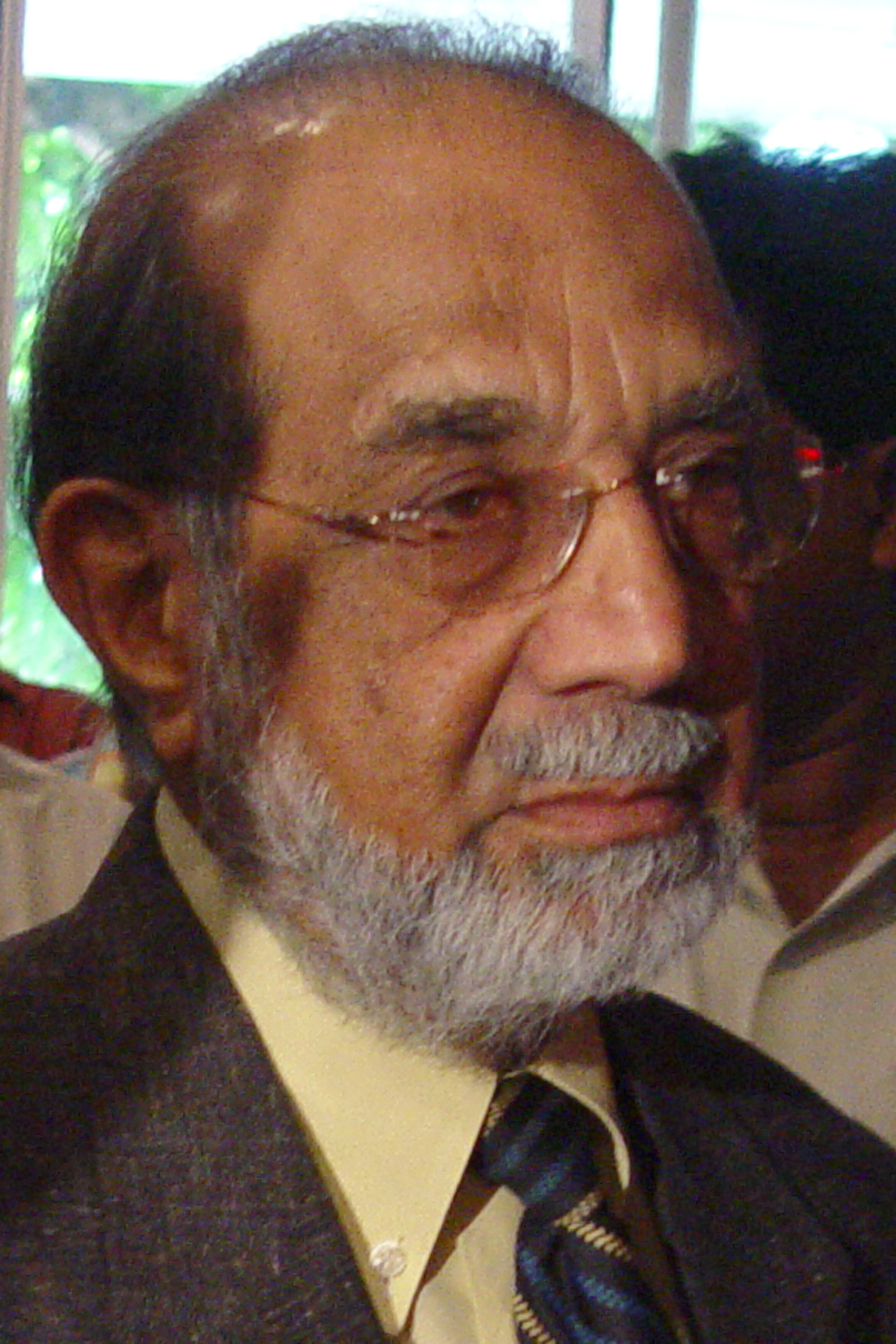
- Shah in May 2004

16th Governor of West Bengal
- In office 4 December 1999 – 14 December 2004
- Preceded by: Shyamal Kumar Sen
- Succeeded by: Gopal Krishna Gandhi

Personal details
- Born: 12 May 1926 Calcutta, Bengal Presidency, British Raj
- Died: 9 March 2013 (aged 86)

Viren J. Shah (12 May 1926 – 9 March 2013) was an Indian politician and businessman. He served as the 17th Governor of West Bengal from 1999 to 2004.

Shah was a member of Lok Sabha from 1967 to 1970 and of Rajya Sabha during 1975–1981 and 1990–1996. He had served as treasurer of the Bharatiya Janata Party.

Shah was chairman emeritus of Mukand Steel, a steel and engineering company in Mumbai, where he held the position of managing director for 27 years from 1972 to 1999.

== Early life ==
Viren J Shah was born in a middle-class family at Chittpore Road, Calcutta (now Kolkata) on 12 May 1926, the son of Jeewanlal Motichand Shah and Jayaben. Jeewanlal Motichand Shah had moved in early 1900 to Calcutta where, in Howrah area, he set up a facility for manufacture of aluminum utensils.

He quit this business later and in 1939, took over Mukand Iron & Steel Works Ltd. with its factory in Lahore and at Reay Road, Bombay (now Mumbai) jointly with Jamnalal Bajaj at the instance of Mahatma Gandhi. This company, set up by Lala Mukandlal of Lahore, a follower of Mahatma Gandhi, was then on the verge of liquidation and Gandhiji persuaded Jeewanlal and Jamnalal to take over and run it in order to protect the livelihood of its employees. Viren Shah was raised in the intensely political environment of India's struggle for freedom from British rule. He lived in Calcutta till 1935, when his father left for his hometown in Gujarat and took up the presidency of Kathiawad Harijan Sevak Sangh and Khadi Prachar Sangh.

Viren Shah had his early education in Bombay (now Mumbai) and Nashik and Wardha. The Commerce College at Wardha, where he was a student, was closed by the Government in 1942, following agitation by the students in support of India's freedom struggle. Many years later, he attended the six-week advanced management programme at Harvard Business School, US.

== Public service ==
He was chairman of the board of visitors of St. George's Hospital, Mumbai – one of the largest public hospitals in Mumbai. He was a Member of the Council of the Indian Institute of Science, Bengaluru and a member of the board of governors of the National Institute of Training in Industrial Engineering, Mumbai. He served on the Central Advisory Committee of the Home Guards. He served as a Member of the National Integration Council (1990).

He actively campaigned for remedial action against Ingress of salinity in the South West Coast of Saurashtra in the State of Gujarat. He was a campaigner, too, for prison reforms, having first-hand experience of the conditions in two of India's prisons, and kept up over the years a steady stream of correspondence on the subject with authorities at all levels, prime minister downwards.

He introduced in 1994 a 'Private Member's Resolution' on 'Atrocities against women' in the Rajya Sabha. Though the resolution was supported by the house during the discussions, the ruling party then opposed it. The resolution was then amended and before putting it to vote, the deputy chairman observed: "… because of the importance of the resolution, I have suspended all Rules and conventions of this House. But this will not become a precedent for future to be quoted anytime… Whatever is said is final." The amended resolution, which included specific practical steps to deal with the issue, was passed unanimously. Two months before his death, in January 2013, he wrote to former chief justice of India J. S. Verma who headed a committee appointed by the Government of India to recommend actions to curb violence against women, following an incident of gang rape in Delhi December 2012, forwarding with his letter a copy of the resolution.

== Politics ==
The economic reforms that commenced in India in the 1990s were substantially those that Viren Shah and his colleagues in politics canvassed assiduously since the 1960s. The breadth of his outlook, marked by rare expansiveness of temperament, was such that he made friends easily all across the political spectrum: Communists, Socialists, Congressmen, Jan Sanghis et al. He worked with all, treating all of them as parts of one seamless web. L.K. Advani recounts an anecdote involving Jyoti Basu, the Communist Party (Marxist) Chief Minister of West Bengal.

"I should recount an interesting incident that transpired six months after the formation of V.P. Singh's government. One day, Jyoti Basu sent a message to us from Calcutta through a common friend: 'This government is not functioning properly. I feel that the three of us – Atalji, you and I – should meet to discuss the situation. Why don't we meet for dinner at Viren Shah's residence in Delhi?'

"The message had come from Viren Shah, a well-known Mumbai-based industrialist who, though an office-bearer of the BJP for some time, was also a good acquaintance of Basu. The NDA government later appointed him Governor of West Bengal, after, of course, consulting with and getting enthusiastic concurrence from Chief Minister Jyoti Basu.

"Atalji and I welcomed the idea of an informal dinner meeting. Nonetheless, we were a little puzzled. We conveyed our response to the intermediary: 'We thank Jyotibabu for his suggestion. If he is interested in meeting us, we are prepared to go to Calcutta to meet him there. Otherwise, if he wants the meeting to take place in Delhi, he is most welcome to come to either Atalji's house or my house for dinner. But we don't understand why we should meet at some other place.' Basu sent us a prompt response. 'No one should know about our meeting. Especially, people in my party would not like it.'

"Ultimately, we met at Shah's residence…" (L K Adwani: 'My Country My Life', Rupa & Co., New Delhi, page 444–445)

When industrialist Viren Shah's name was proposed as Governor of West Bengal in 1999, the proposal found easy acceptance by the Communist Chief Minister. He assumed the office of the governor of West Bengal on 4 December 1999 and completed his term as governor on 14 December 2004.

His opinions on many of the enduring themes of discourse in India's national politics evolved over time. He wrote often and once in the early 1980s ran a column in the fortnightly journal 'Business World' for over a year. The wide variety of topics he chose for his column reflected the breadth of his interests and concerns. His article on 'Sub-nationalisms', published in 'Business World' was uncanny in anticipating the strident demands now coming up for creation of new States in India. His monograph on 'Technology Transfers', first published as 'Chairman's Statement' to the shareholders of Mukand Ltd. before the economic reforms in the early 1990s in India anticipated, again, the needs of the 'globalized' world. Once an admirer of the Presidential system of government, a cause that he championed with great enthusiasm, he changed his opinion during his second term as a Member of Parliament and set out in detail his reasons, characterizing the presidential system as prone to be turned into dictatorship as in several third world countries or as designed to deadlock as in the United States of America. "One lives and learns", he said by way of explanation in a public speech while he was serving his second term as Member of Parliament.

There was never a whisper of an accusation, even from rivals in business, that he sought or obtained, during a decade and half of his time as a Central legislator, advantage in furtherance of his business. Standards of probity in public life meant for him standards of rectitude in the way he ran his business as well.

== 'Emergency' and incarceration ==
In the second half of 1970s, Viren Shah played a role in public affairs that was without parallel for an industrialist or businessman in India or anywhere. His actions need to be seen against the political setting of those turbulent times.

There was widespread opposition building up against the authoritarian acts of Prime Minister Indira Gandhi. In the midst of the resulting turmoil, Allahabad High Court declared her election invalid on grounds of corrupt electoral practice. On appeal, the Supreme Court of India granted only conditional 'stay' of the Order of the High Court. The Supreme Court's Order prevented Indira Gandhi from participating in the proceedings of the Lok Sabha as a member and prevented her also from voting. She was however entitled as prime minister to participate in the proceedings of both Lok Sabha and Rajya Sabha but was prevented from voting. She responded to the challenge by recommending to the president of India that a proclamation be issued declaring that a grave emergency existed whereby the security of India was threatened by internal disturbance. She added in her letter addressed to the president on 25 June 1975 that the matter was extremely urgent, that she would have liked to have taken this to the Cabinet but that unfortunately this was not possible that night and recommended that such a proclamation be issued. The Presidential proclamation issued as recommended by the prime minister was accordingly dated June 25, 1975. There was no report from the Intelligence Bureau, State Governments or from the Union Ministry of Home Affairs to corroborate the facts alleged by her. Clearly, the 'Emergency' was a means to buttress her position as prime minister. This was followed by censorship of the press. The Maintenance of Internal Security Act of 1971 (MISA) was in place which provided for preventive detention attempts were made to interfere with normal functioning of the Courts by arbitrary transfers of judges and other actions designed to pack the Courts. The Attorney General of India, the Government's Chief Law Officer told the Supreme Court that during the emergency, the fundamental rights including the right to life remained suspended. The Court however was unmoved by fears of misuse of powers under emergency. In the famous Habeas Corpus case (ADM Jabalpur v. Shivkant Shukla), Justice Chandrachud observed: "Counsel after counsel expressed the fear that during the emergency, the executive may whip and strip and starve the deterrent if this will be our judgement, even shoot him down. Such misdeeds have not tarnished the record of Free India and I have a diamond-bright, diamond-hard hope that such things will never come to pass." The Commission of Enquiry led by Justice J C Shah later documented how the 'diamond-bright, diamond-hard hope' was belied by setting out a plethora of facts on the arbitrary killings, atrocities and other executive excesses committed under the cover of emergency. H.M. Seervai, said: "The press was muzzled, and so were the legislatures, for the Acts granting immunity to fair reports of legislative proceedings were repealed, and those proceedings could not be reported. Judicial proceedings could not be reported; public meetings could not be held without the permission of the police which was given to "the cringing and the craven" and refused to sober and responsible men; a servile radio and television worked under government orders. Again, public opinion, which is the safeguard of freedom, was strangled at birth, for all means of forming and expressing public opinion were suppressed. Except in a limited class of cases, grounds of detention were not to be communicated to the detenu and his case was not to be referred to an advisory Board, the legislatures were not to be informed about the precise number of people arrested and released, or their whereabouts." ('Constitutional law of India – A Critical Commentary', Third Edition, Appendix III, para.7.) Avenues of legitimate protests were closed under the laws of emergency.

It is in this backdrop that a group of intrepid individuals including Viren J Shah came together in an underground movement spearheaded by George Fernandes to oppose the emergency. The government charged him and others (noted industrialist Viren Shah, who later became the Vice President of the BJP and, later still, the Governor of West Bengal was one of them) with smuggling dynamite to blow up government establishments and railway tracks in what came to be known as the Baroda dynamite case. This made George Fernandes, who was arrested in June 1976, a hero of the anti-Emergency battle." (L K Adwani, Ibid)

The 'Chargesheet' filed on 23/8/1976 by deputy superintendent of police, Special Police Establishment, Central Investigating Unit (A), Central Bureau of Investigation. New Delhi set out the "names of offence and circumstances connected…" in respect of 25 accused persons including George Fernandes and Viren J Shah says:

"Investigation showed that on the declaration of Emergency in the Country on 25.6.75, George Fernandes A-1 went underground and decided to arouse resistance against the imposition of the same and to overawe the Government by use and show of criminal force."

The article on George Fernandes in Wikipedia says: "an industrialist friend, Viren J Shah, Managing Director of Mukand Ltd., helped them find contacts for procuring dynamites, used extensively in quarries around Halol (near Baroda).

The Accused persons were, all of them except two, apprehended and placed under arrest. C.G.K. Reddy said that it was because of a fortuitous circumstance that he was caught. He went on to say: "There were several others who were similarly placed, most prominent of whom was Viren J. Shah. Had he been a little more cautious and less enthusiastic to be involved in many matters, he would have survived the mopping up following the Baroda arrests. Like me, he was arrested because of a single common contact, Bharat Patel, who became an approver in our case." (C.G.K. Reddy: 'Baroda Dynamite Conspiracy, The Right to Rebel', Vision Books, New Delhi, page 45.)

Viren Shah was arrested under The Maintenance of Internal Security Act, 1971 and clamped in Arthur Road Jail, Bombay for six months before he was moved to Tihar Jail, Delhi, where he remained for another three months. Son Rajesh Shah received a message from an intermediary, a retired civil servant, from Rajni Patel, the Congress in Bombay advising that Viren Shah become an approver and if he did, everything would be forgiven.

=== Did the underground movement achieve anything? ===
The Emergency was revoked on 21 March 1977. General Elections were held in March 1977. H.M. Seervai said: "Conflicting explanations have been given for her decision, but the explanation generally given runs as follows: Mrs. Gandhi lacked legitimacy for her dictatorial rule; she believed that the people were behind her, a belief probably strengthened by the current slogan "India is Indira, and Indira is India". Intelligence reports led her to believe that the time chosen by her for the elections was the most appropriate, for at a later date economic difficulties would come to the surface, and the underground movement would grow stronger." (H.M. Seervai: 'Constitutional Law of India', Third Edition, Sweet & Maxwell Ltd., London, page 984. Emphasis supplied). According to Dr. G.G. Parikh, Accused No.5 in the Baroda Dynamite case, many persons opposed to Mrs. Indira Gandhi were aggrieved later that those who led the movement did not enlist them and said that they would have joined it if they had known about it. Though robbed of its top leadership, the movement did not die entirely and it is likely that it served to instill fear in her. Mrs. Indira Gandhi's party was totally routed at the polls. The new Government formed by the Janata Party withdrew the case against the accused who were then set free.

=== Outlier everywhere ===
The press often referred to Viren Shah as 'Maverick businessman' or 'Maverick politician'. Being an outlier in both the worlds, the world of business and of politics, was an essential part of who he was and of his glory.

| Preceded by Shyamal Kumar Sen | Governor of West Bengal; 1999–2004 | Succeeded by Gopalkrishna Gandhi |
