= Keshav Prasad Goenka =

Indian businessman

- Born: 1912; British India
- Died: 1983
- Occupation: Industrialist
- Known for: Goenka Group
- Spouse: Rukmani Devi
- Children: 5; including R. P. Goenka
- Father: Badridas Goenka
- Awards: Padma Bhushan

Keshav Prasad Goenka (1912–1983) was an Indian businessman, industrialist, and one of the leaders among the earlier generations of the Goenka business family. His father, Badridas Goenka, was the nephew of Ramdutt Goenka, the founder of the Group. He was credited with contributions in expanding the business group by acquisitions, such as those of Duncan Brothers and Octavius Steel, two British trading houses and several other business houses. The Government of India awarded him the third highest civilian honour of the Padma Bhushan, in 1969, for his contributions to Indian industry. Goenka, a Marwari by birth, was married to Rukmani Devi, and the couple had three sons and two daughters. R. P. Goenka, the eldest among sons, was the founder of RPG Group.

== See also ==
- R. P. Goenka
