= Kelani Tyres =

Tyre manufacturing company in Sri Lanka

Kelani Tyres PLC
- Logo of Kelani Tyres PLC
- Type: Public
- Traded as: CSE: TYRE.N0000
- ISIN: LK0216N00008
- Industry: Tyre and Tubes
- Founded: October 4, 1990; 35 years ago
- Headquarters: Colombo, Sri Lanka
- Key people: Chanaka De Silva (Chairman); Rohan T. Fernando (Managing Director)
- Brands: CEAT
- Revenue: ▲LKR314 million (2022)
- Operating income: ▼LKR830 million (2022)
- Net income: ▼LKR830 million (2022)
- Total assets: ▲LKR6,668 million (2022)
- Total equity: ▲LKR6,409 million (2022)
- Owners: Silverstock Limited (45.99%); Bank of Ceylon/Ceybank Unit Trust (7.62%)
- Subsidiaries: CEAT Kelani Holdings (Pvt) Ltd (50%, JV with Associated Ceat Holdings (Pvt) Ltd); Executive Cars (Pvt) Ltd (100%)
- Website: kelanityres.lk

Kelani Tyres PLC is a tyre manufacturing company in Sri Lanka. Kelani Tyres originates in the privatisation of the government-owned Ceylon Tyre Corporation. Initially, privatisation is met with extreme employee industrial action for several months. Once the employee unrest dwindled, the company entered into an agreement with CEAT to set up a joint venture in 1993. In 1994, Kelani Tyres was listed on the Colombo Stock Exchange. In 2022, CEAT was amongst the 100 most valuable brands in Sri Lanka. The company moved to meet the total domestic demand for bus and truck tyres which would save LKR11 billion in foreign exchange through import substitution.

== History ==
Sri Lankan Government's state-owned enterprise Ceylon Tyre Corporation was privatised as Kelani Tyres (Pvt) Ltd in 1992. The privatisation yielded LKR400 million for the government, and 2,000 workers were working at the factory at the time. Soon after the privatisation, the company plagued with industrial unrest for seven months. The new owners closed the factory, and prohibited workers from entering the premises. The labour issues were resolved and the factory commenced operations again.

In 1993, Kelani Tyres signed a tripartite agreement with CEAT Ltd of India and Associated Motorways (AMW) which resulted in the creation of Associated CEAT (Pvt) Ltd. In January 1999, Kelani Tyres entered into an agreement with Associated Ceat Holding Company (ACHL), and CEAT to set up a second joint venture, to unite tyre manufacturing. CEAT held 60% of the stake in the ACHL while AMW and National Development Bank held 35% and 5% respectively. The joint venture company exported tyres to Asian, African and South American countries. The company was listed on the Colombo Stock Exchange in 1994.

== Operations ==
Brand Finance valued CEAT Kelani Holdings's CEAT brand to be LKR2,922 million in 2022. CEAT ranked 38th most valuable brand in Sri Lanka, up by ten positions from last year. Fitch Ratings affirmed the credit rating of Kelani Tyre's subsidiary CEAT Kelani Holdings at AA+(lka) in July 2022. The credit outlook was adjudged to be stable. 80% market share in the bias tyre segment, 30% in radial tyre and the economic crisis-driven demand suppression were cited as justification for the rating.

CEAT-Kelani Holdings commissioned a new plant in its Kelaniya manufacturing complex to increase motorcycle tyre manufacturing. The new company is named Asian Tyres Pvt Ltd. The company accounted for 17% of the market share in motorcycle tyres. CEAT Kelani moved to supply the total domestic requirement of bus and truck tyres in 2015, in the wake of the government ramping up policies to develop domestic industries. It would save LKR11 billion in foreign exchange through import substitution. In 2022, Kelani Tyres planned to invest LKR3.2 billion in increasing manufacturing capacity. Car and SUV tyre manufacturing capacity is planned to increase from 51,000 per month to 61,000 per month. Motorcycle tyre manufacturing capacity will be also increased from 41,000 per month to 57,000 per month.

== See also ==
- List of companies listed on the Colombo Stock Exchange
