= RPG Life Sciences =

Indian pharmaceutical company

RPG Life Sciences Limited
- Company type: Public
- Traded as: NSE: RPGLIFE; BSE: 532983
- Industry: Pharmaceuticals
- Founded: 1993; 33 years ago
- Headquarters: Mumbai, Maharashtra, India
- Key people: Yugal Sikri (Managing Director)
- Revenue: ₹512.81 crore (US$53 million) (2023)
- Parent: RPG Enterprises
- Website: www.rpglifesciences.com

RPG Life Sciences (RPGLS) is an Indian pharmaceutical company. Formerly known as Searle (India) Ltd, RPG Life Sciences is part of RPG Enterprises. It has its corporate office in RPG House in Worli, Mumbai. Its three major activities are the manufacturing and marketing of bulk drugs, also known as active pharmaceutical ingredients (API); pharmaceutical formulation; and fermentation and biotechnology. RPGLS is present in the domestic as well as the international market. It exports its products primarily to Europe, Latin America, Australia and South East Asian countries.
