= RPG Group =

Indian industrial conglomerate headquartered in Mumbai

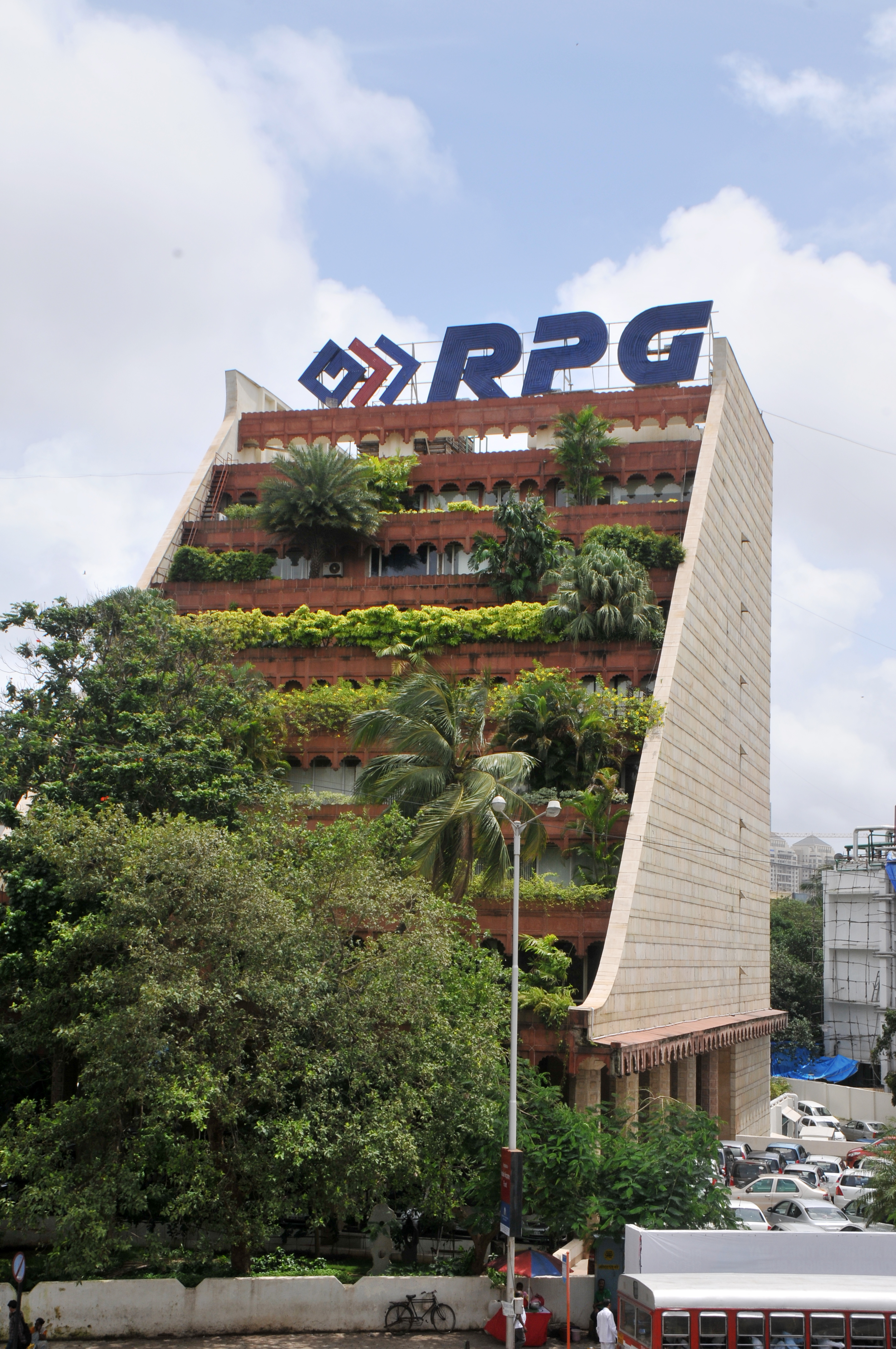
- RPG House, group headquarters, in Mumbai
- Company type: Corporate group
- Industry: Conglomerate
- Founded: 1820; 206 years ago, in Calcutta, India
- Founder: Rama Prasad Goenka
- Headquarters: RPG House, Annie Besant Road, Worli, Mumbai, India
- Key people: Harsh Goenka (chairman)
- Products: Tyre; Infrastructure; Technology; Specialty
- Revenue: ₹25,500 crore (US$2.7 billion) (2018−19)
- Operating income: ₹2,660 crore (US$280 million) (2018−19)
- Net income: ₹1,085 crore (US$110 million) (2018−19)
- Number of employees: 30,000+ (2018)
- Subsidiaries: CEAT; KEC International; Zensar Technologies; RPG Life Sciences; Raychem RPG; Harrisons Malayalam; RPG Ventures
- Website: www.rpggroup.com

The Rama Prasad Goenka Group, commonly known as RPG Group, is an Indian industrial and services conglomerate headquartered in Mumbai. The roots of the RPG Group can be traced back to the enterprise of Ramdutt Goenka in 1820. RPG Enterprises was established in 1979 by Rama Prasad Goenka and initially comprised the Phillips Carbon Black, Asian Cables, Agarpara Jute, and Murphy India companies. R. P. Goenka held the title of Chairman Emeritus until his death in 2013. The present chairman is Harsh Goenka, R. P. Goenka's eldest son.

The RPG Group currently consists of more than fifteen companies, mainly infrastructure, tires, and life sciences. Some of the companies it holds are CEAT Tyres, information technology firm Zensar Technologies, infrastructure company KEC International, pharmaceutical company RPG Life Sciences, a 50/50 joint-venture with TE Connectivity for Raychem RPG, plantation company Harrisons Malayalam, and e-commerce company Seniority.

== Group companies ==
The conglomerate's major companies, subsidiaries and affiliates are divided among the following 4 sectors.

=== Tyres ===
==== CEAT ====
CEAT is the flagship company of RPG Enterprises, with an annual turnover of ₹7,573 crore (equivalent to ₹100 billion or US$1.1 billion in 2023) in the financial year 2020-21. It is the largest exporter of tyres in India, exporting to over 100 countries. The company is headquartered in Mumbai. It has manufacturing plants in Bhandup and Ambernath in Mumbai, Nashik, and Halol (near Baroda).

==== CEAT Sri Lanka ====
Entering the Sri Lankan market in 1992, CEAT India formed a joint venture with AMW, and subsequently a three-way venture with Kelani Tyres in 1999, to manufacture and market CEAT tyres in Sri Lanka. This venture resulted in the creation of CEAT Kelani Associated Holdings, formerly Kelani Tyres, which is today the largest domestic tyre manufacturer in Sri Lanka. The exit of AMW in 2009, resulted in a joint venture between CEAT Kelani Holdings and CEAT India. Commencing operations with one plant in Kalutara, the company today has three plants, including a radial plant constructed in 2006. CEAT Kelani is the single largest brand in the radial tyre segment in Sri Lanka, with a 33 percent market share.

==== CEAT Bangladesh ====
In 2017, the conglomerate entered into a joint-venture with Bangladeshi group, A K Khan & Company, to set up a plant in Bhaluka, Mymensingh with an initial investment of US$67 million. CEAT obtained a 70% stake in this joint-venture.

=== Infrastructure ===
==== KEC International ====
KEC is a power transmission engineering-procurement-construction (EPC) company, recording a turnover of ₹13,114 crore (equivalent to ₹180 billion or US$1.8 billion in 2023) in the financial year 2020–21. The company has developed power infrastructure in over 70 countries across South Asia, the Middle East and North Africa (MENA), Africa, Central Asia, and the Americas. While power transmission is its largest vertical, the company also has a presence in railways, civil, urban infrastructure, solar infrastructure, and oil and gas cross-country pipelines.

==== SAE Towers ====
In April 2010, KEC International set up the world's largest tower testing station at Butibori, in Nagpur. In September 2010, KEC International acquired Houston-based SAE Towers, a group of operating companies incorporated in the United States, Mexico, and Brazil, consolidated through SAE Towers Holdings, LLC. This acquisition created the second largest steel-lattice tower manufacturer in the world with approximately 1,02,000 MT of annual production capacity. The company also executes EPC works for several transmission lines in the region.

=== Information technology ===
==== Zensar Technologies ====
Zensar Technologies is an information technology services and outsourcing company headquartered in Pune, India. It offers information technology (IT) and BPO products and services. The company has software development centers at Pune, Hyderabad, and Bangalore in India; Gdańsk, Poland; and the Middle East.

=== Specialty ===
==== Raychem RPG ====
Raychem RPG Limited is a 50:50 joint venture between RPG and US group TE Connectivity (formerly Tyco Electronics). It manufactures cable accessories and connector systems for the power sector.

==== RPG Life Sciences ====
RPG Life Sciences (RPGLS) is an Indian pharmaceutical company, formerly known as Searle (India) Ltd. It is engaged in manufacturing and marketing of bulk drugs, also known as API (Active Pharmaceutical Ingredients), pharmaceutical formulation and fermentation & biotechnology.

==== Harrisons Malayalam ====
Harrisons Malayalam is an agricultural business corporation. It cultivates between 14'000 ha – 26'000 ha (information varies) of its own land and processes products from other farmlands in its neighbourhood. In addition to banana, cardamom, cocoa, coffee, coconut, pepper, and vanilla, its primary products are rubber, tea, and pineapple. Harrisons Malayalam is the largest producer of pineapples in India, and the largest producer of tea in South India. It employs around 13,000 people in rural Kerala.

=== Venture capital ===
==== RPG Ventures ====
It is the venture capital arm of the RPG Group, which invests in startups.
