= Badridas Goenka =

Indian industrialist and business tycoon

Sir Badridas Goenka
- Born: 29 July 1883; Calcutta, British India
- Died: 26 February 1973 (aged 89); Calcutta, India
- Education: Presidency College, Kolkata
- Spouse: Manorama
- Children: Keshav Prasad Goenka
- Awards: Rai Bahadur (1925); CIE (1928); Knight Bachelor (1934)

Rai Bahadur Sir Badridas Goenka CIE (29 July 1883 – 26 February 1973) was an Indian industrialist and business tycoon who served as the Chairman of the Imperial Bank of India from 1933 (now known as the State Bank of India).

== Early life and education ==
Badridas Goenka was born on 29 July 1883 in Calcutta to Ramachandra Goenka. The Goenkas were a Marwari family which hailed from Dundlod in Shekhawati in Jhunjhunu District of Rajasthan. His elder brother was Hariram Goenka and younger brother was Ghanshyam Das Goenka. In 1905, Goenka graduated from the Presidency College, Calcutta - he was the first Marwari to graduate. In college, Goenka developed an interest in physics and chemistry. He married Manorama in 1899.

== Career ==
Goenka joined the family business after graduation and was in 1910, elected Secretary of the Marwari Association. In 1923, Goenka was nominated over his rival G. D. Birla to the Marwari reserved seat in the Imperial Legislative Council of India. This resulted in an uncompromising political rivalry between the two. However, in 1930, Goenka declined an offer to be a part of the Viceroy's executive council.

In 1928, Goenka was part of the Hilton-Young Commission which investigated the financial situation in India. In 1930, he was appointed a director of the Imperial Bank of India and in 1933, he became Chairman, the first Indian to hold the post. He was elected for a second term in 1941.

== Later life ==
Goenka patched up with his old opponent G. D. Birla in the early 1940s and joined his Federation of Indian Chambers of Commerce and Industry (FICCI) of which Badridas became President in 1945. During the Bengal Famine, the two worked together to provide relief measures in the affected areas. When his term as President of FICCI came to an end, Goenka retired from all business and voluntary associations.

In his later years, Badridas increasingly transferred his responsibilities to his son Keshav Prasad Goenka. Goenka died on 26 February 1973. His death was mourned at a special meeting of the prominent citizens of Calcutta.

== Honours ==
Goenka was appointed a Companion of the Order of the Indian Empire (CIE) in the 1928 Birthday Honours, and a knight bachelor in the 1934 New Year Honours. The investiture took place in New Delhi in March 1934.
