= Asia MotorWorks =

Indian automotive company

Asia Motor Works Limited
- Type: Private
- Industry: Automotive and auto-components
- Founded: 2002; 24 years ago
- Founder: Anirudh Bhuwalka
- Defunct: July 28, 2023
- Fate: Ceased vehicle production in the mid-2010s and was formally admitted into liquidation by the National Company Law Tribunal (NCLT) in July 2023 after a failed corporate revival plan
- Headquarters: Mumbai, Maharashtra, India
- Key people: Anirudh Bhuwalka (MD & CEO)
- Products: Commercial Vehicles; Auto Components; Road Safety Solutions; Forgings
- Revenue: ₹1,000 crore (US$100 million) (FY 2011 peak) ₹44 crore (US$5.3 million) (FY 2019 final)
- Website: www.amwmotors.com

Asia Motor Works Ltd (AMW) was an Indian automotive manufacturing company. The company effectively ceased vehicle production in the mid-2010s and was formally admitted into liquidation by the National Company Law Tribunal (NCLT) in July 2023 after a failed corporate revival plan.Founded in 2002, AMW has won Commercial Vehicle (CV) of the year 2008 from NDTV Profit Car and Bike Awards & "CV Innovation of the Year" for 2010 from CV Magazine & Zee Business News.

== Operations ==
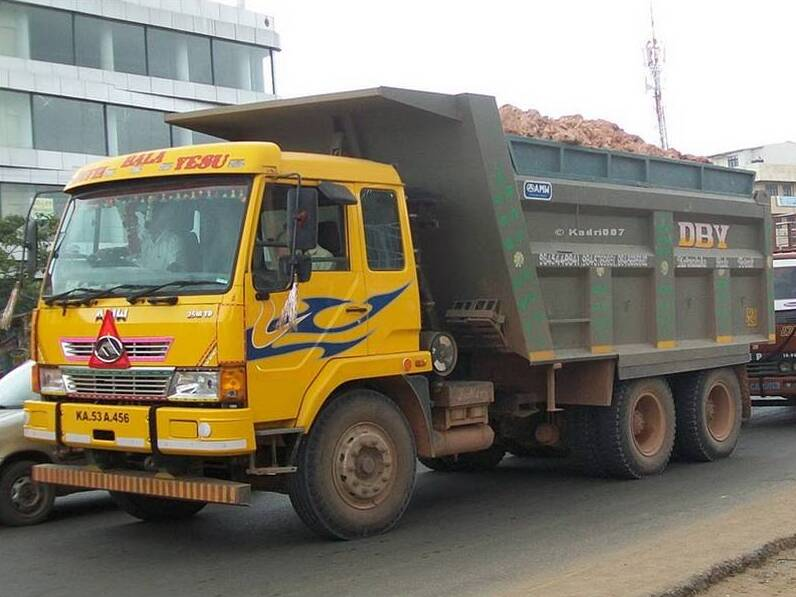
AMW 2518

AMW's product range covers a range of heavy-duty applications in mining, construction, power, petroleum, roads and highways, other infrastructure projects and general cargo transportation.

AMW trucks design are based on the 1983–1996 Japanese Mitsubishi Fuso The Great.

The company's manufacturing facility in Bhuj, Western India is spread over 2 million sq. meters and produces vehicles for a range of civilian and defence applications. AMW has invested over Rs 20 billion in the plant and has a capacity to produce 50,000 vehicles a year. In addition AMW makes tipper bodies, trailers and other fully built vehicles at their plant.

The manufacturing includes assembly, axles and drivelines, frame shop and automated cab painting facilities.

AMW's vehicles are exported to the South Asian Association for Regional Cooperation nations including Nepal, Bhutan, Bangladesh and Myanmar

=== Financial distress and liquidation (2018–present) ===
Following a prolonged economic slowdown and regulatory bans on mining in India, AMW Motors halted truck production at its manufacturing plant in Bhuj, Gujarat, due to a severe crunch in working capital. By 2018, the company had accumulated over ₹4,195 crore in debt. Consequently, IDBI Bank and a consortium of lenders initiated corporate insolvency resolution proceedings (CIRP) against AMW Motors under the Insolvency and Bankruptcy Code (IBC) at the National Company Law Tribunal (NCLT) Ahmedabad bench.

In December 2022, the NCLT initially approved a ₹210-crores acquisition and turnaround bid by U.S.-based Triton Electric Vehicle LLC to acquire AMW's heavy vehicle manufacturing facilities. However, Triton EV defaulted on its payment commitments, leading the tribunal to encash its bank guarantees and scrap the revival plan.

On 28 July 2023, the NCLT Ahmedabad bench officially ordered the liquidation of AMW Motors, appointing Avil Menezes as the liquidator to auction off the corporate assets. While a separate sister entity, AMW Auto Component Limited, was successfully acquired by Steel Strips Wheels Limited (SSWL) for ₹138 crore, the truck-making division was entirely dissolved.

== Components ==
AMW manufactures components for the automotive and general engineering industries. AMW's capacity of 15 million wheel rims makes it the largest single location plant in Asia. The company supplies pressed metal components to the world's auto and white goods manufacturers. AMW has over 1500 touch points across India.
