= Harsh Goenka =

Indian businessman

Harsh Vardhan Goenka
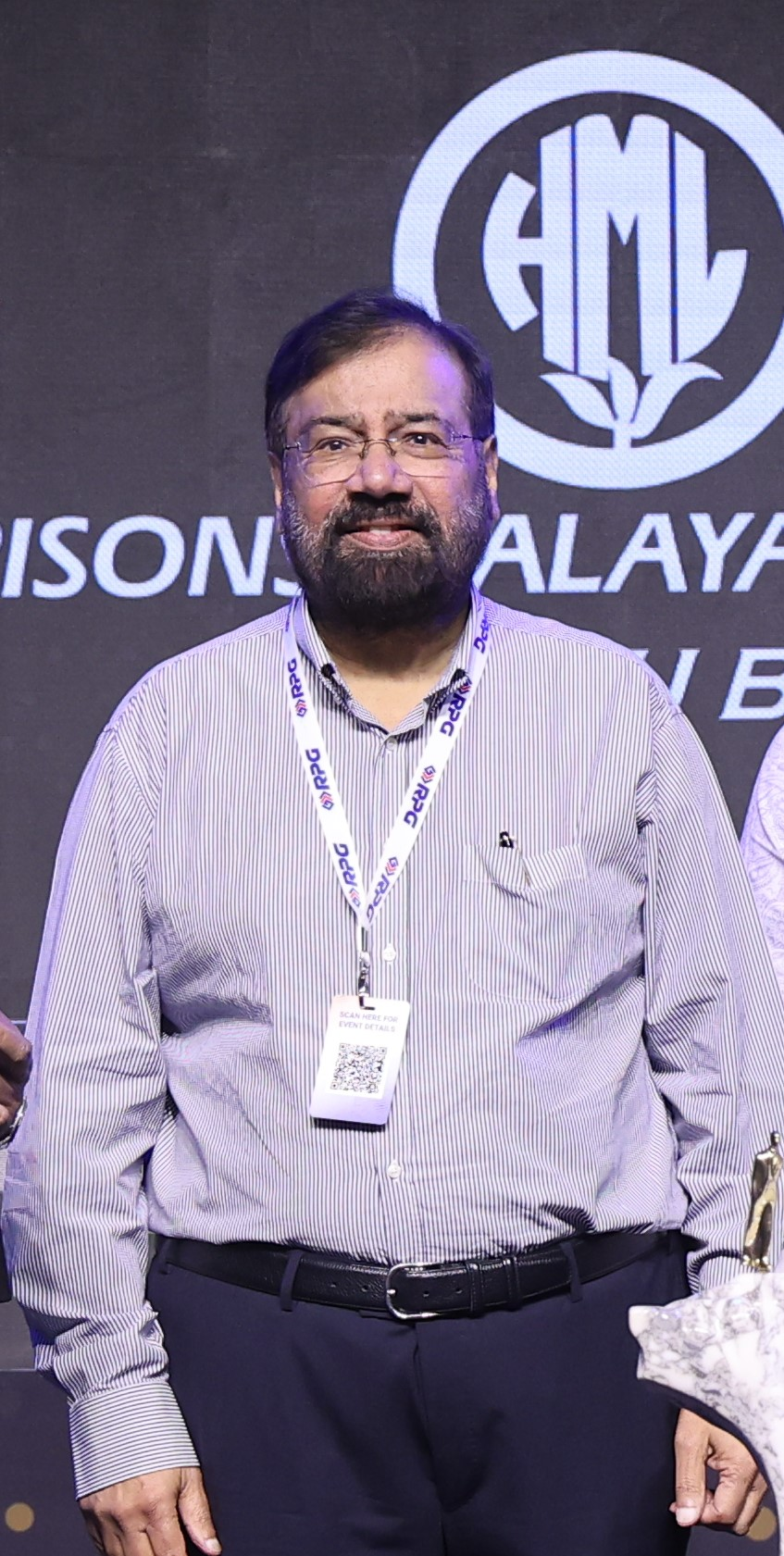
- Born: 23 December 1957 (age 68); Calcutta, West Bengal, India
- Education: University of Calcutta; International Institute for Management Development
- Title: Chairman of RPG Group
- Spouse: Mala Goenka
- Children: 2 (Anant Goenka, Vasundhara Goenka)
- Parent: R. P. Goenka
- Relatives: Sanjiv Goenka (brother)

Harsh Vardhan Goenka (born 23 December 1957) is an Indian industrialist and the chairman of RPG Enterprises, a Mumbai-based business conglomerate comprising over fifteen companies operating sectors, including infrastructure, tyres, information technology, and life sciences.

According to Forbes, Goenka was ranked 1,045th on the 2024 list of global billionaires and 76th on Forbes India’s list of the country’s 100 richest individuals, with an estimated net worth of US$4.1 billion as of October 2024.

== Early life and education ==
Goenka was born into a Marwari family in Kolkata, West Bengal. He was born to Sushila Devi Goenka and industrialist R. P. Goenka, the founder of RPG Enterprises. He is the eldest son in the Goenka family. Goenka completed his undergraduate studies in Economics at St. Xavier’s College, Kolkata.

He later obtained a Master of Business Administration from the International Institute for Management Development in Lausanne, Switzerland, where he was subsequently inducted into the institute’s board.

Goenka is married to Mala Goenka. His children include Vasundhara Goenka, and Anant Goenka, who serves as Vice Chairman of RPG Enterprises and CEO of CEAT.

== Career ==
After completing his education, Harsh Goenka began his professional career in Mumbai. In 1983, at the age of 24, he was appointed Managing Director of CEAT Ltd. He succeeded his father, R. P. Goenka, as the Chairman of RPG Enterprises in 1988.

Under his leadership, the group expanded through a series of mergers, acquisitions, and joint ventures during the 1980s and 1990s. RPG Enterprises established collaborations with several multinational corporations, including Goodyear, DuPont, Vodafone, Fujitsu, Phelps Dodge.

Goenka has served as President of the Indian Merchants’ Chamber and is a member of the Executive Committee of the Federation of Indian Chambers of Commerce and Industry.

Goenka serves as Chairman of the Board at Spencer International Hotels Ltd.

== Philanthropy ==
Harsh Goenka serves as a trustee of the RPG Foundation and the RPG Art Foundation, which undertake various social initiatives in areas such as primary education, women’s empowerment, healthcare, and urban beautification.

Goenka serves as a member of the National Art Advisory Committee for the National Gallery of Modern Art and is part of the Council of the National Culture Fund under India’s Ministry of Culture.

== Board memberships ==
- Former president, Indian Merchants' Chamber
- Chairman of the board, KEC International Ltd, CEAT Limited, Zensar Technologies Ltd, RPG Life Sciences Ltd, Spencer International Hotels Ltd
- Member- Executive committee, Federation of Indian Chambers of Commerce & Industry.
- Former member of the board of governors, National Institute of Industrial Engineering (NITIE)
- Member of the foundation board, International Institute for Management Development, Switzerland,
- Trustee, Breach Candy Hospital Trust
