= Federation of Indian Chambers of Commerce & Industry =

Non-governmental trade association and advocacy group based in India

Federation of Indian Chambers of Commerce and Industry
- FICCI's Logo
- Abbreviation: FICCI
- Formation: 1927; 99 years ago
- Founder: Ghanshyam Das Birla; Purshottamdas Thakurdas
- Type: Non-governmental trade association
- Purpose: Policy advocacy
- Headquarters: New Delhi, India
- Coordinates: 28°37′38″N 77°13′54″E
- Region served: Worldwide
- Services: Business promotion, networking, policy reforms
- Members: over 250,000 companies
- Secretary General: Anant Swarup
- Director General: Jyoti Vij
- Key people: Mr. Anant Goenka (President)
- Employees: 500
- Website: ficci.in

The Federation of Indian Chambers of Commerce and Industry (FICCI) is a non-governmental trade association and advocacy group based in India.

== History ==
The Federation of Indian Chambers of Commerce and Industry (FICCI) was established in 1927 following a resolution at the fourth session of the Indian Industrial and Commercial Congress held in Calcutta, which was moved by Sir Purshottamdas Thakurdas and supported by leaders such as Prof. Benoy Kumar Sarker and Pandit Madan Mohan Malaviya. The federation formally began functioning on 1 February 1927 with its first office located in Bombay at the premises of the Indian Merchants' Chamber, and two years later its name was changed to include 'Industry' as well as 'Commerce.' The founding members included prominent chambers and trade associations such as the Indian Chamber of Commerce (Calcutta), Southern India Chamber of Commerce (Madras), Ahmedabad Millowners' Association, and East India Jute Association. By 1936, the Secretariat shifted to New Delhi, and after independence, FICCI expanded its institutional presence with dedicated headquarters, including the building inaugurated by Prime Minister Jawaharlal Nehru in 1958. Since its inception, FICCI has served as a key body for representing Indian business interests and influencing economic policy in both colonial and independent India.

It is the largest, one of the oldest and the apex business organisation in India. It is a non-government, not-for-profit organisation. FICCI draws its membership from the corporate sector, both private and public, including SMEs and MNCs. The chamber has an indirect membership of over 250,000 companies from various regional chambers of commerce. It is involved in sector-specific business building, business promotion and networking.

=== Allied organisations ===
==== Confederation of Indian Food Trade and Industry ====
Confederation of Indian Food Trade and Industry (CIFTI) caters to the Indian food Industry. It deals with policies, trade affairs and capacity building. CIFTI provides institutional support and partners with the Government and the Indian private sector in promotion and development of Indian food processing industry. CIFTI was established by FICCI in 1985. It is currently led by Sanjay Khajuria who serves as its president.

==== Arbitration and Conciliation Tribunal ====
FICCI Arbitration and Conciliation Tribunal (FACT) provides arbitration services for settling commercial disputes. FACT was established in 1952 and aims at settling business disputes outside the traditional framework offered by courts of law through arbitration and conciliation, as the case may be.

==== Alliance for Consumer Care ====
FICCI Alliance for Consumer Care (FACC) is a dedicated centre set up by FICCI along with Department of Consumer Affairs (India) to enhance consumer care practices and facilitate stakeholder interaction. It facilitates prompt redressal of consumer grievances, a dialogue between the business and consumers and promotion of responsible business practices.

==== Ladies Organisation ====
FICCI Ladies Organisation was established in 1983 to promote entrepreneurship and professional excellence among women in India.

==== Aditya Birla CSR Centre for Excellence ====
Aditya Birla CSR Centre for Excellence is a joint initiative of FICCI and the Aditya Birla Group. The center aims at development of inclusive and holistic CSR practices. This centre also organises the Businessworld FICCI CSR Award, an annual award aimed at identifying & recognising remarkable CSR initiatives.

==== Confederation of Micro, Small and Medium Enterprises (CMSME) ====
Confederation of Micro, Small and Medium Enterprises is an affiliated body of FICCI. It was established in December 2013. It aims to connect MSMEs with mentors, incubators and accelerators and assist them through capacity building programs and services; deliberate of policy concerns of the sector; and provide regular interface between Industry, Government and regulators. In terms of the scope of work, CMSME is similar to FICCI with the only differentiation being the exclusive focus on Micro, Small and Medium enterprises in India.

==== CASCADE ====
FICCI Committee Against Smuggling and Counterfeiting Activities Destroying Economy (CASCADE) was launched on 18 January 2011 and aims to run consumer sensitisation drives on the impact of using smuggled, contraband and counterfeit products across India. The body is also engaged in capacity building of law enforcement agencies and research. It has estimated an annual tax loss to government of India due to smuggling and counterfeits at Rs 26,190 crore.

=== Technology commercialisation ===
==== DRDO–FICCI Accelerated Technology Assessment and Commercialisation (ATAC) Programme ====
DRDO and FICCI started the ATAC programme in February 2009 with an objective to create commercial linkages for DRDO technologies for use in civilian products and services. The Explosives Detector Kit developed by DRDO is being commercialised under this initiative. Bio-toilets based upon the bio-digester technology developed by DRDO is another such technology being commercialised under the program. It is projected that DRDO will install 18000 bio-toilets across India in cooperation with various states, Union Territories, FICCI and Ganga Action Plan. Besides, over 10000 bio-digesters are being installed in passenger coaches of the Indian Rail.

=== Taskforces ===
- Aerospace and Air Defence Taskforce; headed by Air Marshal M. Matheswaran (retd.), Indian Air Force.
- International Migration and Diaspora Taskforce; headed by Alwyn Didar Singh, former Indian civil servant.
- Land Reforms and Policy Taskforce; headed by R V Kanoria, Kanoria Chemicals
- Edtech Taskforce; headed by Divya Gokulnath.
- Nutraceutical Taskforce; headed by Sanjaya Mariwala, Executive Chairman and MD, OmniActive Health Technologies.

== Initiatives ==
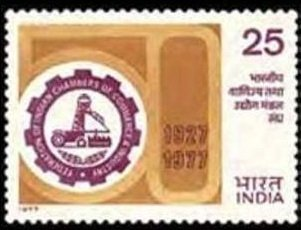
50th Anniversary of Federation of Indian Chamber of Commerce and Industry commemorative stamp, 1977

=== Millennium Alliance ===
FICCI's Millennium alliance aims at supporting and scaling-up low-cost, innovative solutions. It is a joint initiative of FICCI, Department of Science & Technology, Government of India and the United States Agency for International Development. It was launched during July 2012 as an inclusive platform for social impact funds, venture capitalists, corporate foundations, early investors, and donors to support and scale innovative solutions for base of the pyramid populations in India and around the world.

=== Invest India ===
Invest India is a public-private partnership between Government and FICCI. A joint venture between FICCI (51% equity), Department of Industrial Policy & Promotion (India) (34%) and State Governments of India (0.5% equity each), Invest India was given a clearance by the Indian cabinet during September 2009 to set up under Section 25 of the Companies Act, 1956. The initiative aims at speedy implementation of foreign investment projects in India and improving the climate for domestic investments.

== Services ==
=== ATA Carnet ===
FICCI is India's sole national issuing and guaranteeing association for ATA Carnets. ATA Carnets are used by TV / Film crews, journalists, engineers, musicians and industry for temporary moving equipment across borders. FICCI issues and endorses carnets, guarantees the payment of duties and taxes to customs (both domestic and foreign) authorities.

== Notable alumni ==
- Krishna Kumar Birla (1974–1975)
- Hari Shankar Singhania (1979–1980)
- R. P. Goenka (1986–1987)
- Chirayu Amin (2000–2001)
- Rajeev Chandrasekhar (2007–2008)
- Rajan Mittal (2009–2010)
- Amit Mitra, noted economist and the current Finance Minister of the Indian state of West Bengal was Secretary General, FICCI during 1994–2011.
- Uday Shankar (2020–2021)
- Naina Lal Kidwai is the Past President, FICCI. She is the first Indian woman to graduate from Harvard Business School. and currently is the Group General Manager and Country Head of HSBC India.

== See also ==
- Confederation of Indian Industry
- NASSCOM
- ASSOCHAM
- Indian Chamber of Commerce
