= Abdul Nazer Mahdani =

Indian politician and Islamic cleric (born 1966)

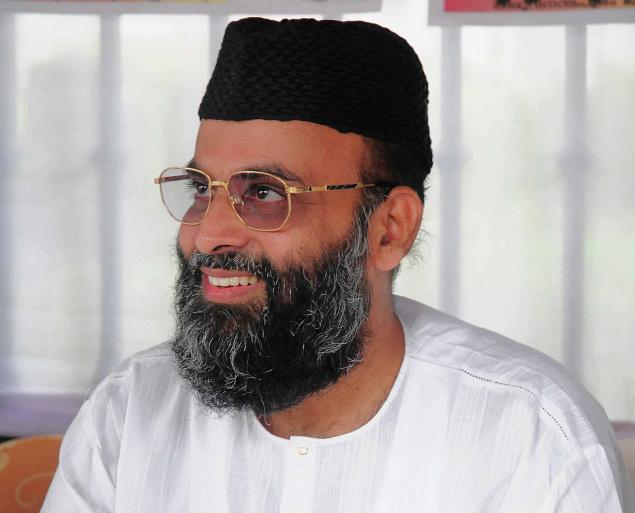

Personal details
- Born: 18 January 1966 (age 60) Sasthamkotta, Kollam, Kerala, India
- Party: Peoples Democratic Party
- Spouse: Soofiya Ma'dani
- Children: 3
- Education: Jami'a Nooriyya Arabic College
- Occupation: Politician; Islamic cleric
- Nickname: Maudany

Abdul Nazer Mahdani (born 18 January 1966), also spelled Abdul Nasir Ma'dani is an Indian politician and Islamic cleric. He is the leader of Peoples Democratic Party (PDP) from Kerala.

Mahdani was accused of involvement in 1998 Coimbatore bombings, but was acquitted of all charges after spending 9 1/2 years in Coimbatore Central Prison. He is currently under judicial custody at Karnataka in relation to the 2008 Bangalore serial blasts.

== Personal life ==
Ma'dani was born in Anvarserry, Mynagappally, Kollam district to Abdul Samad and Asma Beevi on 18 January 1966. He is married to Soofiya Ma'dani and has three children; a daughter named Shameera Jauhara and two sons named Umar Mukhthar and Salaludin Ayoobi. Shameera is married to Nizam, a native of Karunagappalli. Umar Mukhthar is married to Nihammat, a native of Thalassery.

Ma'dani's wife, Soofiya, was the tenth accused in 2005 Kalamassery bus burning case.

Ma'dani lost his right leg on 6 August 1992, following a bombing attack near Anwarserry, and has used a prosthetic leg since then.

== Political activism and allies ==
At a young age, Mahdani began delivering sermons at a local mosque in the Kollam district. His oratory skills were well received, and he soon built up a following. He subsequently formed the Islamic Seva Sangh (ISS) in 1989. This organization was banned following the Demolition of the Babri Masjid. In 1992, he launched a new outfit named Peoples Democratic Party (India), calling for Muslim-Dalit movement.

Though Mahdani was jailed in 1998, his outfit backed the United Democratic Front in the 2001 Kerala Legislative Assembly election, and the Left Democratic Front in the 2006 Kerala Legislative Assembly election. He and his political outfit were in alliance with Communist Party of India (Marxist) for the 2009 Indian general election. Mahdani is still the chairman of the Peoples Democratic Party.

=== Chengara Solidarity March ===
Mahdani delivered a speech at the Chengara Adivasi Protest in support of the struggle in May 2008. He declared the objective of Muslim-Dalit-Adivasi Unity under the banner of "Power to Avarnas and Liberation to The Oppressed

== Incarceration and release ==
=== 1998 Arrests and release ===
Ma'dani was arrested by the Kerala Police under the leadership of Jacob Thomas IPS on March 31, 1998 in Kaloor, in connection with 1998 Coimbatore bombings. He was initially shifted to Kozhikode and then to Tamil Nadu. He was released on August 1, 2007 after acquittal in this case.

=== Free Ma'dani Campaigns ===
In March 16, 2006, the Kerala Legislative Assembly passed a unanimous resolution seeking the release of Ma'dani on humanitarian grounds from Coimbatore Central Prison in connection with 1998 blasts.

The Peoples Democratic Party and politicians like K. T. Jaleel also petitioned for the release of Ma'dani.

With the aim of providing legal and financial aid to Ma'dani, the Justice For Ma'dani Forum was constituted under the aegis of various Muslim organisations on 25 August 2010. The Justice for Ma'dani Forum demanded that the Bangalore blast case, in which Ma'dani was listed among the accused, should be probed by any agency outside the state of Karnataka, preferably by the National Investigation Agency.

There is a section of society who claims that Ma'dani was unlawfully kept in undertrial for too long and was framed.

=== 2010 arrest ===
Ma'dani was arrested by a joint team of Karnataka Police and Kerala Police from his residence in the Kollam district on August 17, 2010. He was lodged in Central Prison, Bangalore after the arrests.

=== Bails after 2010 arrest ===
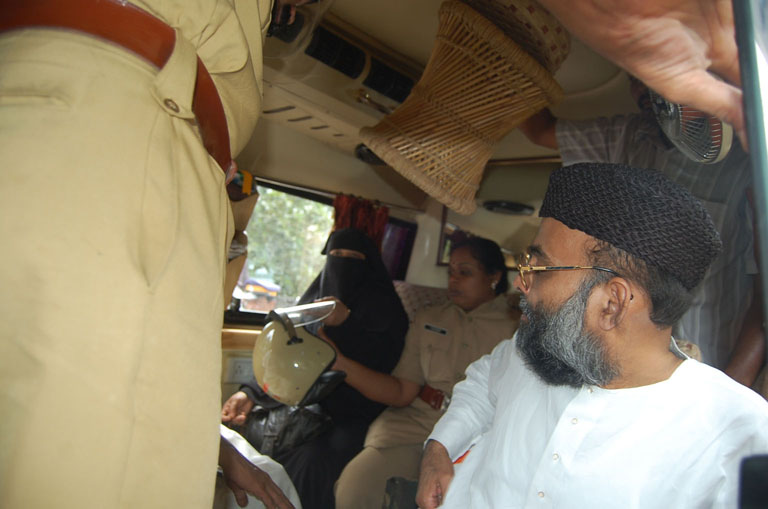
Mahdani while being arrested for Bangalore blast case

In March 2013, Mahdani was granted a 5-day interim bail to attend his daughter's wedding and to visit his ailing father. During this time, he made controversial remarks during a speech at his daughter's wedding. On 21 October 2013, the Supreme Court of India directed the Karnataka Government to immediately shift Mahdani to a private hospital for treatment. The court also allowed his wife to come with him as a bystander during his hospital stay. In November 2014, the Government of Karnataka submitted that the enquiries for trial will be completed in six months.

On 24 July 2017, his bail application for attending his son's marriage on 9 August was initially rejected by NIA court. In response to this, the PDP called for statewide Hartal in Kerala on 26 July 2017. Later, the Supreme Court of India granted him 7 day bail from Aug 7 - August 14 to attend his son's wedding in Thalassery.

In October 2018, he was granted bail to visit his ailing mother. In 2021, the Supreme Court rejected his plea for further relaxations in 2014 bail conditions.

== Controversies ==
=== Islamic Seva Sangh ===
Mahdani had set up the Islamic Seva Sangh in 1989. It was banned in 1992 for alleged subversive acts, along with SIMI and Jamaat-e-Islami, following the Babri Masjid demolition.

=== Hate Speeches ===
There were numerous cases charged against him by the Kerala Police for making inflammatory speeches and issuing vitriolic communal statements after the Babri Masjid demolition. There are nearly 24 cases charged against Mahdani in Kerala.

=== Alleged involvement in Coimbatore blast case ===
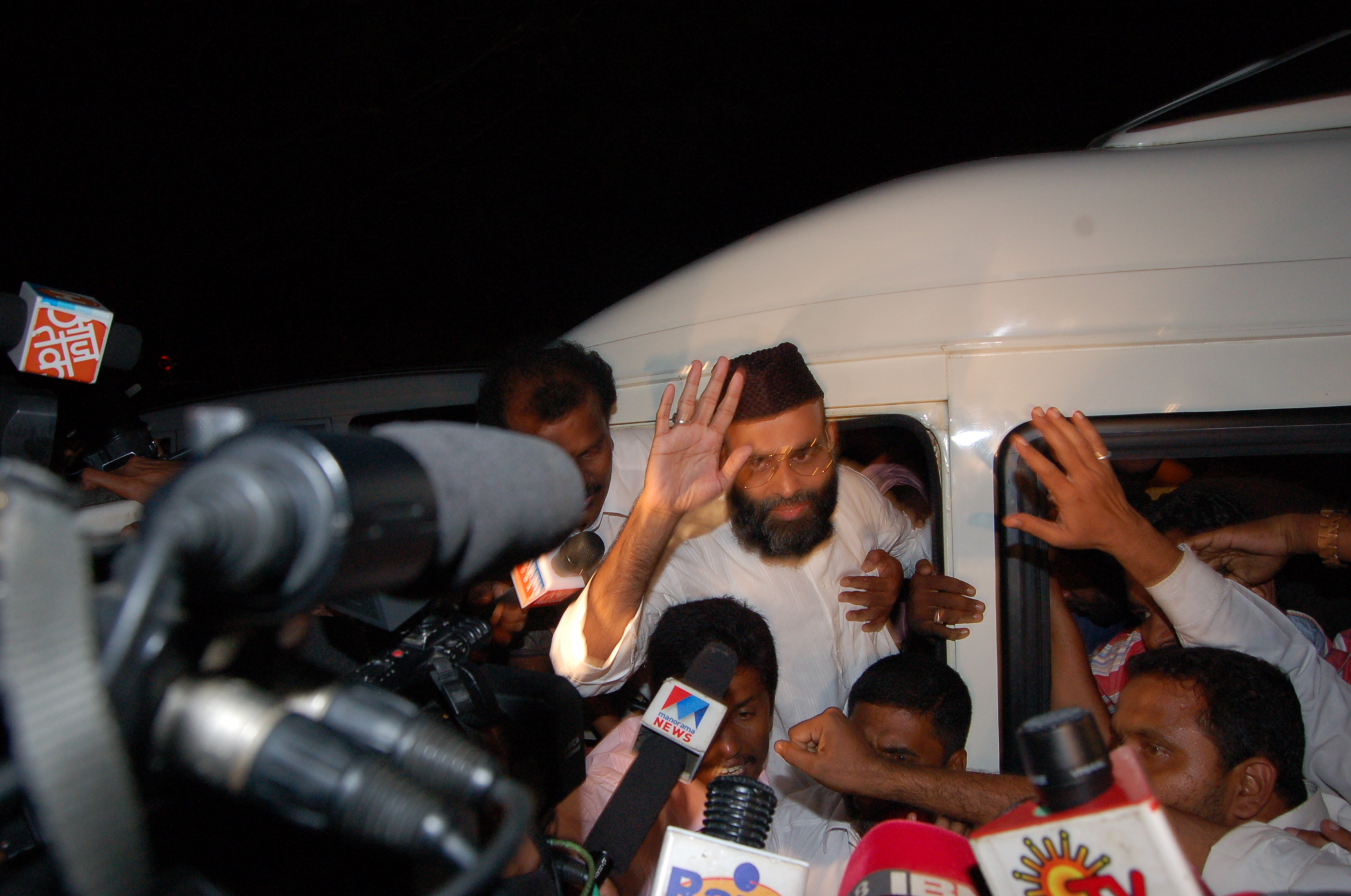
Ma'dani after his release from Coimbatore jail

Mahdani was allegedly involved in the 1998 Coimbatore bombings, which killed 58 people. He was imprisoned for nine years in this case in Tamil Nadu. Later, Mahdani was acquitted of all charges in this case.

=== Alleged involvement in Bangalore Blasts ===
==== Connections with Thadiyantavide Nazeer ====
Investigators allege that suspected South India commander of the Lashkar-e-Taiba, Thadiyantavide Nazeer, came into militancy through ISS founded by Mahdani. Nazeer is suspected to have established links with LeT and was picked up by Bangladeshi authorities and handed over to BSF on the Meghalaya border. In connection with the Bangalore blast case, police have presented phone records to the court proving that Ma'dani contacted the main accused several times both before and after the blast. Phone calls were made from a number registered in Ma'dani's wife's name.

According to police, after orchestrating the blasts, Nazeer went into hiding at Ma'dani's office in Anvarssery. However, Ma'dani's advocate, B. V. Acharya, has contended that it is "only a make believe theory to implicate Ma'dani". Nazeer also confessed that he coordinated the 2005 Kalamassery bus burning case for the release of Ma'dani from Coimbatore jail.

High Court and Supreme court observations in Bangalore blast case

Ma'dani is lodged in Karnataka jail and is in judicial custody for his involvement in the 2008 Bangalore serial blasts, which killed one person and injured 20 more, and for similar incidents in Ahmedabad, Surat, and Jaipur. As per former Karnataka State Home Minister V. S. Acharya, Mahdani also allegedly admitted a role in the 2010 Bangalore stadium bombing on 17 April 2010, which he had denied earlier. This assertion regarding a confession was rejected by Mahdani's counsel, who said that the allegation was baseless, devoid of facts, and politically motivated. After a court issued a fresh, non-bailable warrant, Mahdani claimed that he proffered to surrender, so as to avoid 'unpleasant situations' when he was arrested.

On 11 February 2011, the Karnataka High Court rejected Mahdani's plea, stating that there is no direct evidence of conspiracies against Ma'dani. At the final hearing, Justice Markandey Katju stated that "he was wondering as to how a person on a wheel chair could pose a threat if released on bail." The Supreme Court bench was divided on the matter of granting bail to Mahdani and posted the matter to Chief Justice of India to form a new bench to decide on the plea. However, in 2013-14 court relaxed bail conditions, and Ma'dani was granted bail on personal grounds by courts multiple times between 2013 and 2018. In 2020, Chief Justice of India Sharad Arvind Bobde called Ma'Dani a dangerous man during a plea for further relaxation in bail conditions.

=== Murder attempt case ===
Madhani has been named the first accused in a case registered in 2013 relating to the alleged attempt in 1998 to murder RSS ideologue P. Parameswaran and Father K. K. Alavi, a convert into Christianity from Islam. The case relates to Ma'dani offering money for the murder of both individuals. Ma'dani dismissed the charges and said he was not involved in it and the alleged political conspiracy against him. In September 2015, Crime Branch submitted to the court that Parameswaran and Alavi stated that they had never faced any attempt on their life as alleged in the complaint and that no evidence could be obtained to substantiate this allegation against Mahdani.

== See also ==
- 1998 Coimbatore bombings
- 2008 Bangalore serial blasts
- Terrorism in India
