= Chengara struggle =

Controversy about land in Kerala, India

Chengara Struggle
- Part of Land rights movements in India
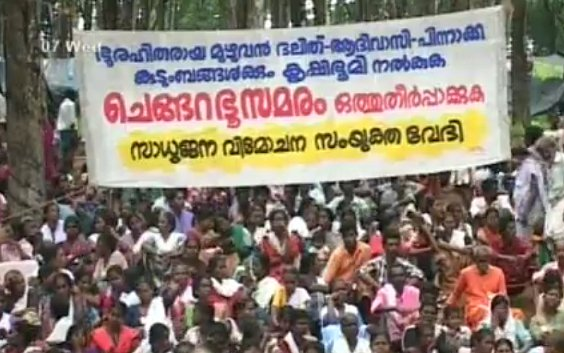
- Adivasis protesting for their land (Chengara Samaram)
- Date: August 2007 – ongoing
- Location: Chengara, Pathanamthitta district, Kerala, India
- Methods: Nonviolent occupation sit-in protest
- Status: Ongoing; partial settlement offered, implementation disputed

Parties
Adivasi Gothra Maha Sabha, Sadhujana Vimochana Samyuktha Vedi	Government of Kerala, Harrison Malayalam Ltd

Lead figures
Laha Gopalan; C.K. Janu; M. Geethanandan (AGMS)	V. S. Achuthanandan (Chief Minister); A. K. Balan (Welfare Minister); Binoy Viswam (Forest Minister); Oommen Chandy (Opposition Leader); Police leadership

Number
~7,500 landless families (at peak)	Not publicly disclosed

Casualties and losses
None reported	None reported

The Chengara struggle refers to an ongoing controversy about land near the Chengara village in the Pathanamthitta district in Kerala, India.

== Background ==
=== Harrisons Malayalam Ltd. ===
Harrisons Malayalam Ltd. is an agricultural business corporation with a history that goes back over 150 years. According to its own slogan, it is "India's most diversified agri-business". It is the largest producer of pineapples in India, the largest producer of tea in South India, and the largest employer in the region. It employs around 13,000 people in rural Kerala, and more than 100,000 people are, according to the companies own information, dependent on the company for their livelihood.

Harrisons Malayalam Ltd. started its rubber production in the early 1900s. Today, it is spread over 10 estates in Kerala. One of these 10 is the Kumbazha estate, situated in Chengara near Konni in Kerala's Pathanamthitta district, which has been occupied by the Dalits and Adivasis.

Until 1984, the company was wholly foreign-owned by Harrisons & Crosfield (named Elementis plc. after 1998), the UK's largest specialty chemicals business. Since 1984, Harrisons Malayalam Ltd. is part of the RPG Enterprises, one of India's largest business groups. In popular perception, Harrisons Malayalam Ltd. still remains a 'foreign' company.

=== Adivasis and Dalits in Kerala ===
The Scheduled Castes and Scheduled Tribes are official designations given to various groups of historically disadvantaged people. The Scheduled Castes and Scheduled Tribes comprise about 16.6% and 8.6%, respectively, of India's population (according to the 2011 census). The Schedules Castes are known as Dalits (the lowest group in the caste hierarchy; "untouchables") and Scheduled Tribes are known as Adivasi ("original inhabitants", the indigenous communities). Dalits and Adivasis represent 10% and 1.1% of Kerala's population respectively.

=== Land Reforms Act ===
==== Janmi-Kudiyan System ====
Through a longer stretch of history, the Dalits have been the backbone of Kerala's wetland rice cultivation. Initially, they were slaves, but after the year 1850, they became attached laborers (following the ban on slave traffic). Finally, in the 1940s, they became "free" laborers (following the advance of caste-based social movements and communist trade union organization). Although they were integral to agrarian production, they were prevented from owning land in Kerala's traditional caste society.

Until the late 1950s, the centuries-old Janmi-Kudiyan (landlord-tenant) landholding system, based on the caste system, prevailed in Kerala. In this system, the landlords were Namboothiris (called Brahmins in the rest of India) - the highest in the caste hierarchy. The land was often leased to the Dalits – the lowest caste - for cultivation, with a simple taxation system. For a long time, it resembled European feudalism, save the differences introduced by the caste system. This means that the ownership of land was concentrated in the hands of a few individual landlords.

Innumerable malpractices like untouchability, inapproachability, and unseeability, were widely practiced by the Namboothiris. Many of these practices were based on the idea of purity, which gave rise to the widespread practice of theendal (pollution). These practices pushed the Adivasis and the Dalits into servitude, slavery, dispossession, and displacement, which then compelled them to pawn their dignity and their human rights at the feet of a caste-based society. By the early 20th century, due to the impact of several social reformations, Kerala managed to officially get rid of untouchability and other malpractices which alienated the Dalits and Adivasis. However, prejudices against them continue, especially in rural areas.

==== Land Reforms – theory ====
In 1957, elections for the new Kerala Legislative Assembly were held, and a reformist, communist-led government came into power. It was the first time a communist government (Communist Party of India- CPI) was democratically elected to power anywhere in the world. It initiated pioneering land reforms. One of the key legislations the state had undertaken to ensure land for the landless was "The Kerala Land Reforms Act, 1963". By this act, the centuries-old Janmi-Kudiyan system was brought to an end.

The major objective of the land reform has been the re-ordering of agrarian relations in order to achieve an egalitarian social structure ("Land to the Tiller"). With a view to achieve this objective, the Kerala Land Reform Act, 1963, imposes certain restrictions on ownership and possession of landed properties in the state. This is commonly known as "ceiling". Ceiling means that there is a total extent of land that a "person" can own. Land over the ceiling limit is deemed surplus land. If the individual owns more land than the ceiling limit, the surplus land should be taken away by the government (with or without paying compensation to original owner) and be distributed (as one example) among small farmers, tenants, or landless laborers.

The ceiling in Kerala varies with the size of the household and does not exceed 25 standard acres (10 ha), the maximum that the largest family could own. In the case of a company, the limit is 10 standard acres, subject to a maximum of 15 acres. However, the Kerala Land Reforms Act, 1963, exempted certain kinds of land from the ceiling limit, including plantations and private forests (sec. 81).

==== Land Reforms – implementation ====
According to the Kerala Land Reforms Act, 1963, the government was to distribute surplus and revenue forest land to Kerala's landless poor. Though the land ceiling laws were expected to create large extents of surplus land, most landlords circumvented the legal requirement through bogus transfers, gift deeds, and other methods. Until today, the act has not been fully implemented, resulting in a huge number of landless people in the state.

The government of Kerala claims that there is no surplus land left to distribute. Generally, there is considerable confusion in Kerala as to who possesses what land. It is not unusual for the forest and revenue departments to claim a particular piece of land as theirs. However, only an inquiry and survey into land property in Kerala would reveal the actual situation and probable violations of the Land Ceiling Law. Therefore, in 2008/2009, the Kerala government initiated a project called "Bhoomi keralam" (in Malayalam, "Kerala Earth") to implement a resurvey of Kerala lands (originally started in 1966). A specially created body, the Kerala Land Information Mission, was entrusted with measuring the land and identifying 27,000 ha to be distributed to Dalits and Adivasis. However, the project got stuck and only a few surveys have been initiated.

==== Implications for Dalits and Adivasis ====
The historic Kerala Land Reforms Act, 1963, with its "land to the tiller" policy, turned out negative for the Dalits and Adivasis. By the new law, the tenants of the land (settled farmers, mostly upper and middle-caste citizens) became the owners and the laborers, while the Dalits and Adivasis were left mostly landless. As of September 2010, only 2% of Dalits and 2.21% of Adivasis were provided a very limited livelihood. In Kerala, 56% of 6.5 million Adivasis and Dalits still have no land. The rest, who are regarded as landowners, might possess as little as 1/100 of an acre, while some of the local corporate houses have access to thousands of acres on lease.

Some Dalits and Adivasis were given ownership of plots of land under their huts. However, these plots were so small that they now form over 16,500 ghetto-like quarters housing several generations (one-lakh colonies). This resulted in the total derailment of their life. This legal denial of ownership and access to land meant that they would never evolve as land-owners, despite their continued role in agrarian society.

== The Chengara Struggle ==
=== Beginning ===
In 2001, the Adivasis in Kerala had led a month-and-a-half-long struggle under the banner of the Adivasi Gotra Mahasabha, led by tribeswoman C.K. Janu, and had attracted global attention. The demand was that 45,000 landless Adivasi families be provided five acres each of cultivable land. The government of Kerala then said that land would be identified and a recommendation would be made to the Union government that Adivasi lands be included in the Fifth Schedule of the Constitution, so that the land could be alienated at a later date. This promise of land assignment has been met partially.

On 27 September 2006, the Chief Minister of Kerala, V.S. Achuthanandan, gave a written assurance that the government would allot land to a sizeable number of landless families by 31 December 2006. This promise was not met.

In January 2007, as reaction to the broken promise, the United Struggle Front of the poor for Liberation (Sadhujana Vimochana Samyuktha Vedi, SJVSV) started the first attempt to reclaim land. They chose an estate of Harrisons Malayalam Ltd. The struggle was led by the Dalit activist Laha Gopalan, a former government employee and a self-proclaimed Communist Party of India worker. This struggle was called off due to assurance by the Kerala Government that it would look into their demands.

Months passed, but there was no sign of any positive move from the state government. Therefore, on 4 August 2007, the SJVSV led 300 landless families to another estate of Harrisons Malayalam Ltd, the Chengara estate, to claim and occupy land. This was the start of what is now known as the Chengara Struggle. The struggle does not take place in the village Chengara, but in Harrisons Malayalam's Kumbazha estate, more than three km away. This estate is popularly known as Chengara estate, so the struggle was named "Chengara Struggle" or "Chengara Samaram" in the local language Malayalam.

In the initial phase, the Dalits and Adivasis occupied about 125 acres of land. After the Onam festival in Kerala, they spread to a larger area, covering four hills - each family occupying one acre of land. Afterwards, they reclaimed the whole estate (about 6,000 acres), which is spread out over 7 hills. Their numbers swelled by the day and at one time, there were as many as 7,500 families, involving 29,000 people from different parts of Kerala.

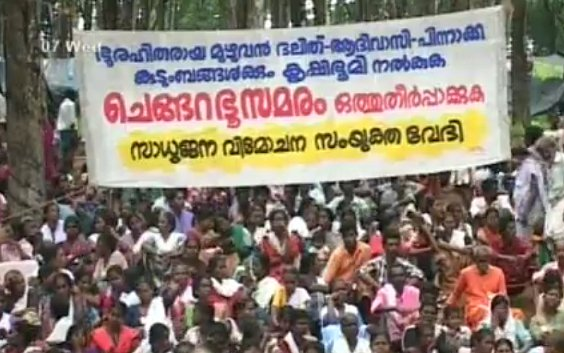
Chengara Samaram - Adivaasis Protesting for their land

The protestors pitched tents on the occupied land and started tapping the rubber trees in the estate, eking out a living in due course. They demanded land and labor to live. These were the people left out of the once-launched land reforms of Kerala. Unlike struggles opposing forced displacement, the Chengara struggle is a direct claim on land by the landless. One woman stated that "I spent my whole life on four cents (approx. 1/25 of an acre) of land. Even when I die, my family has to bury me on that piece of land. That's why we struggle for Chengara. It's struggle for life!"

The Dalits and Adivasis were demanding that the Kerala government distribute the land among them, which had been part of a long-standing promise by the Kerala government. They initially demanded permanent ownership of five acres of land for farming and INR 50,000 in cash towards initial farming expenses to each landless family. The demand was later reduced to one acre of land.

=== Arguments of the Dalits and Adivasis ===
The Dalits and Adivasis argue that the government promised to collect the land illegally possessed by plantation owners like Harrisons Malayalam Ltd. and pass it on to the landless. They mention three reasons why they found the landholding of the Harissons Malaylam Ltd. Chengara estate illegal:

- The lease of the Chengara estate has long expired.
- Harissons Malayalam Ltd. had lapsed on its rent payments.
- Even if there was a valid lease, Harissons Malayalam Ltd. occupies much more land than the lease would allow.

==== Lease has expired ====
The Dalits and Adivasis are claiming that the Harissons Malayalam Ltd.'s land lease has long expired. The Chengara estate was leased to Harissons Malayalam Ltd. for 99 years by the Vanchipuzha Madhom family, which in turn leased the land from the feudal ruler of Travancore. Travancore was one of the kingdoms which later merged into Kerala State. According to the statement of Harrisons Malayalam Ltd. in the High Court of Kerala, they acquired these properties in the year 1800 and the early 1990s, and they claim these are freehold land or leasehold land.

The lease period ended, depending on the source, either in the year 1985, 1996, or 2006. Once the lease was over, the land should have been automatically transferred back to the ‘original owner’ – in the absence of the feudal ruler, the Government of Kerala. The government of Kerala could afterward distribute the land to the Dalits and Adivasis.

Unfortunately, authentic information on the lease period is not available, and the government itself seems to be groping in the dark. "Documents are not available even under Right to Information Act", says Tony Thomas of one Earth One Life, a civil society organization working for environmental protection. "The reply he gets from the authorities is that old records of lease are not available. Most of the plantations have political backing. That could be the reason for not getting the documents", says Tony.

==== Rent was not paid ====
The Dalits and Adivasi also argue that the rent for the lease was not paid, depending on the source, since 1996 or 1985-86. According to the Dalis and Adivasis, this should have accumulated rent payments of more than INR 5,000,000,000 to the state government.

==== More land than the extent of the lease ====
The Dalits and Adivasis allege that Harissons Malayalam Ltd. is in possession of more land than the actual extent allowed under the government's lease. Until now, the land has not been measured by Harissons Malayalam Ltd. The SJVSV alleged that Harissons Malayalam Ltd. has encroached almost 5,000 acres in excess of what they were lawfully eligible to hold. SJVSV argues: "We are only occupying land that belongs to us, which was encroached upon by the company," he adds. "Let the government measure the land and show the company their limits."

=== Harrisons Malayalam Ltd.'s response to the struggle ===
Harrisons Malayalam Ltd. stated that after the 1964 Land Reforms Act of Kerala, rights to the land were vested with the tenants and there was no issue regarding lease expiration. Harrisons Malayalam Ltd. went to the Kerala High Court demanding that the encroachers be evicted. The Kerala High Court held that the trespass is illegal and that the SJVSV has no right over the Chengara estate land, and therefore ordered an eviction. The court had directed the government to evict the encroachers within three months without bloodshed or loss of life.

Although the High Court ordered the eviction of the Dalits and Adivasis, the official machinery could do little in this regard, as the encroachers had declared their struggle as a "do-or die battle for land". One of their sole weapons was the threat of committing collective suicide. When the police were getting ready to take action, men climbed trees and were ready to jump and hang themselves. One man said: "We don't have any weapons to fight you, but we have strong minds. The Government and Harissons has to step on our dead bodies to enter this land." The women were the most vocal, declaring, "We have five liters of Kerosin Oil and the moment the authorities turn us out we will burn ourselves. No question of retreating without getting land". In Chengara, a smooth eviction was impossible, as the Dalits and Adivasis were very determined, ready to die rather than renounce their legitimate claims. Only an agreement with the government could lead to a peaceful resolution of the conflict.

The estate trade-unions also decided to participate in the conflict. They claimed their work was hindered due to the encroachment and therefore were opposed to the landless people's movement. However, Laha Gopalan, the leader of the struggle, rejected this allegation and said that the land they encroached upon was not exploited, as it was intended to be replanted.

As the eviction didn't work even through force, a blockade was created along with the trade unions, which culminated in the deliberate cutting-off of food and other essential supplies to the protesters. According to Laha Gopalan, the blockade of the camp by the unions was organized by the company itself; Harrisons Malayalam Ltd. had paid some of their workers to block the roads and manifest that they had lost jobs due to the occupation. As the result of this campaign, countless families with new-born babies and over 85-year-old men and women were denied not only food and medicine, but even drinking water. Medical professionals, media personnel, and human rights activists were prevented from meeting them. On 14 August 2008, the trade unions lifted the blockade for a period of ten days and issued an ultimatum to the encroaching families to leave the plantation site within the ten day time-frame, which fueled the hostile situation.

In subsequent days, unlawful detention of people and violent intimidation of the protestors became frequent. Men trying to leave the plantation to seek work were attacked and beaten. Women were threatened with sexual violence both overtly and covertly. Human rights activists were violently prevented from entering the area in full view of the police and government officials. People starved, some fell ill, a few had to be hospitalized - but the majority refused to leave the site.

In August 2008, an incident of torture and rape of four women was reported in Chengara. The accused were workers in the trade unions, affiliated to political parties, and hired henchmen. The women testified that the attacks had taken place in the presence of the police, who remained onlookers. There was no response from the state to redress the situation.

After several rounds of talks between the SJVSV and the government, the two-year-old blockade was lifted, providing a breathing space for those in the struggle. During the protest, lack of food, scarcity of water, absence of medical facilities, and hostile weather conditions led to the death of 13 people.

== Effect of the Struggle ==
=== No support from political parties ===
The struggle did not have the backing of any mainstream political parties. The mainstream society of Kerala either ignores this struggle or pretends that nothing serious occurred except for a law and order problem. Some even perceive this as a violent and militant struggle, thereby indirectly indicating that they are supported by "Naxals", the communist guerilla. However, great personalities from different fields visited the place during the struggle. Prominent socio-political leaders including Medha Patkar, Arundhati Roy, Govindacharaya, and V.M. Sudheeran, were among those who visited Chengara, extending solidarity to the families. "Somehow, the ruling class seems to be reluctant to consider indigenous people as citizens of this country," stated Sukumaran, a Dalit agitating in Chengara. "In 2009, the then LDF Government had offered land to some of us but what they were given were rocky waste lands. Still, there is no word about the rest of us."

The Left Democratic Front (LDF), led by the Communist Party of India-Marxist (CPIM), sees the agitation as illegal, but emphasized that the government is going ahead with its program to allot land to the landless in the state. LDF convener Vaikom Viswan said, "The struggle in the Harrisons Malayalam Ltd. estate is to be seen as an encroachment and the talks with the agitators will help expose them. The government will do all it can to evict the people from the estate, though it will do all it can to allot land to the landless." The Communist Party of India-Marxist found itself in an awkward position, as it claimed to be the spokesperson of both social groups. On one side were the Dalits and Adivasis, and on the other side were the plantation workers and trade-unions.

=== Chengara Package ===
On 5 October 2009, after 790 days, the agitation was "settled" during a discussion between the leadership of the struggle and the Left Democratic Front (LDF) government. According to the agreement, 1,432 families out of the 1,738 families who had started living on the rubber plantation of Harrisons Malayalam Ltd. would get land elsewhere in the state and financial assistance to build houses as part of the settlement, and the land was to be made available to the beneficiaries within three months. The plots of land would be in different parts of Kerala. The approximately 300 remaining families apparently already owned some land and were therefore ineligible. According to the SJVSV, as many as 7,000 families that occupied the estate, many more than the 1,738 identified by the government.

The agreement specified different categories of families. Based on these categories, the families would get land and a financial offer. The Chengara Package in a nutshell is shown below:

Category	Nb. of families	Land offer (in acre)	Total land (in acre)	Financial offer (in INR)	Total amount (in INR)
Scheduled tribes	27	1	27	125'000	3'375'000
Scheduled castes	832	0.5	208	100'000	83'200'000
Others (Ezhava, Christians and Nair)	48	0.25	12	75'000	3'600'000
Rest, who own land up to 0.05 acres	525	0.25	131.25	75'000	39'375'000
Total	1'432	-	378.25	-	129'550'000

The omnipresent poverty and suffering of the days of struggle might have persuaded the leadership of the struggle to accept the package. When the agreement was reached, SJVSV leader Laha Gopalan admitted that he had been forced to make this compromise. Gopalan told the magazine Frontline that he was being forced to stop the agitation "temporarily" and accept an unsatisfactory resolution package "drawn out jointly by the government and the opposition against the interests of Dalits" and "under threat of violent reprisals from CPI(M) cadre" if he did otherwise. He did this under the pressing fear of another Nandigram, where a violent intervention of 4,000 policemen in March 2007 in West Bengal left 14 dead and 70 injured amongst the local population, who were demonstrating against their expropriation for a special economic zone.

At a joint press conference following the announcement of the package, in the presence of opposition leader Oommen Chandy (who played a key role in formulating the settlement), the Chief Minister of Kerala said it was difficult to find the necessary land in Kerala to implement the package that was being offered, and there was no way the government could fulfil the SJVSV's demand for more.

A few of the occupants welcomed the agreement and accepted the offer, but many refused to move out of the site, as they were skeptical of the agreement being implemented in full once the struggle was called off.

According to the current Chief Minister of Kerala, regarding the previous ruling, "LDF government failed to fulfill the sprit of the settlement entered into with the agitators".

To name a few problems of the agreement:

- Mr. Gopalan, the leader of the struggle, claimed that the total number of landless families at Chengara was above 7,000 against the roughly 1,432 identified by the revenue team.
- There were a number of complaints regarding the land being distributed without proper documents and facilities. For example, some Adivasis had received land in 2004, but not the proper deeds/papers. In the absence of these documents, they were offered land elsewhere, and their land was distributed again.
- Many people declined to occupy the land allotted to them, finding it unsuitable for human habitation and farming. This argument is supported by the currently ruling Chief Minister (UDF government) who said that the "land distributed as part of package was not fit for housing or agriculture". These lands were far away from human habitation, and the presence of wild animals made it impossible for people to continue to live there.
- The distribution of land amongst the various tribes and castes was uneven. Some received one acre of land, while others received only 25 cents.
- Those who have 0.06 acres (6 cents) of land have been denied land under the package.

Many families who left after the agreement in 2009 with the Left Democratic Front (LDF) government have tried to return to the site. Some were stopped or arrested. Of the many who were offered title deeds (pattas) for land by the government, more than half did not receive them. Those who were willing to leave after getting the deeds were sent to disparate and distant places such as Periya, Keezhanthur, Nilambur, and Attappadi.

According to Laha Gopalan, except for a few families who were given land in Malappuram, Ernakulam, and Kollam districts, the rest were cheated by the government and forced to return to Chengara. According to him, those who returned expressed deep regret for having trusted the government. A countable few stayed wherever they got new land and were hesitant to return because others at the site of the struggle had already warned them of this fate.

However, the mere existence of an agreement can be considered as a victory for Adivasis and Dalits, who fought against injustice, alone and in their own name. The fact that they were promised land for cultivation adds legitimacy to their struggle. As their demands were only partially fulfilled, others feel the struggle was a failure, perhaps setting a future precedent that will make it even more difficult for marginalized social groups struggling for the recognition of their rights.

Among the many attempts to reach a compromise, a new agreement was proposed in August 2011 by the present United Democratic Front (UDF) government. The UDF has promised to look into the complaints on the distribution of uninhabitable land and to distribute 0.25 acres each to 1,000 more families living at the site of the struggle. However, nothing happened and a new agreement was not reached.

=== Eviction of Harrisons Malayalam Ltd. ===
Some isolated incidents reported from various districts, which had come to the notice of revenue authorities since 2004, led to an operation to verify the legitimacy of Harrisons Malayalam Ltd.'s landholdings. In 2006, the Kerala government conducted a detailed report about the company's landholdings. The two volume report, which spanned over 1,000 pages, concluded that the land held by the company is illegal. "The company's case was not excess land ceiling case. It was actually a case of illegal holding of thousands of acres of land by using forged documents," land revenue commissioner Nivedita P Haran said. According to the Government of Kerala, Harrisons Malayalam Ltd. has as much as 59,363 acres (or 2,402 ha) of illegal land in the state of Kerala.

Several governments initiated probes, but followed them up with little action until 2013. The government created a special team led by Mr. Rajamanikyam, following a Kerala High Court on 28 February, to take over all unauthorised landholdings, if any, of HML in the state. In October, 2013, M.G. Rajamanickam, with power vested by the Kerala High Court and the Kerala Land Conservancy Act, inspected the land in four districts, one of them the Kumbazha, near Chengara. He heard the company's contentions and finally decided that the land belonged to the government, and that the company was an illegal occupant.

On 5 November 2013, a meeting of representatives of the agitators of the Chengara land struggle, officials, and Chief Minister of Kerala, Oommen Chandy, was held in the chamber of the Chief Minister.

A final decision on issuing an eviction notice was taken by revenue minister Adoor Prakash, in consultation with chief minister Oommen Chandy.

On 28 November 2014, the government served an eviction notice to Harrisons Malayalam Ltd. to vacate 29,185 acres of land spread over districts, including Chengara estate in Pathanamthitta district. Harrison had usurped a total of 62,500 acres of land. The remaining land in Ernakulam, Kozhikode, Thrissur, and Wayanad districts were to be taken over in the second stage. It was noticed that they had usurped land after forging documents. In 2015, after the above-mentioned order, the government shifted its focus to those estates that are in the custody of various private groups, most of which were sold by HML.

== What can be learned ==
According to Geevarghese Mar Coorilos, Metropolitan of the Niranom diocese of the Jacobite Syrian Church, the Chengara struggle is "a historic struggle for land by the landless poor". Renowned writer and environmentalist Arundhati Roy termed Kerala's Chengara land agitation as "the most revolutionary struggle that is going on in India."

=== The specialty of the Chengara struggle ===
The Chengara movement is symbolic for two main reasons.

- Firstly, it is not a struggle against eviction from one's own land for a private enterprise. It was the biggest community organisation of landless farmers who made effort to challenge a strong structural system with the backing of extremist ideologies encroached on the land of one of the largest Indian industrial groups to claim their birth rights for land as citizens of India.
- Secondly, this struggle is also unique from a political point of view as it is led for the first time in Kerala by landless farmers themselves and not by political parties. It is even oriented against all political parties, and its efficiency in safeguarding interests of the common people. Let it be then present Left Democratic Front coalition which was ruling Kerala or other leftist parties who claim to represent the interests of oppressed and marginalized people like Dalits and Adivasis.
