= Adivasi Gotra Maha Sabha =

Tribal rights organization in Kerala, India

- Adivasi Gothra Mahasabha
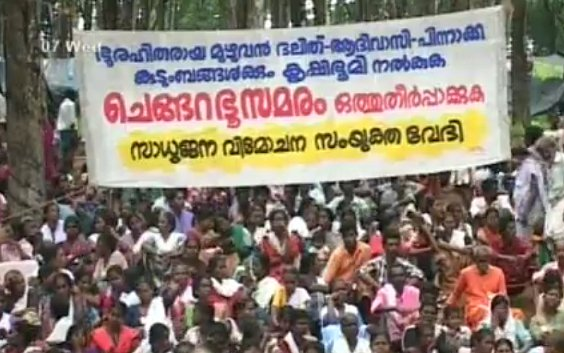
- Chengara struggle led by Adivasi Gotra Maha Sabha
- Abbreviation: AGMS
- Formation: 2000
- Founders: C.K. Janu, M. Geethanandan
- Type: Tribal rights advocacy group
- Headquarters: Kerala, India
- Region served: Kerala
- Key people: C.K. Janu (Chairperson), M. Geethanandan (State Coordinator)
- Affiliations: Sadhujana Vimochana Samyuktha Vedi (SVSV); People's Union for Civil Liberties (PUCL); Kerala Pulayar Maha Sabha (KPMS); National Alliance of People's Movements (NAPM)

Adivasi Gotra Maha Sabha (AGMS) is a tribal-rights organization based in Kerala, India. It was formed around 2000 by Adivasi and Dalit activists including C.K. Janu and M. Geethanandan to demand land rights and implementation of tribal welfare laws. The organization is known for leading protests and agitations demanding land redistribution and tribal rights, most notably the 2003 occupation of land in the Muthanga Wildlife Sanctuary.

== History ==
=== Formation ===
Kerala’s tribal communities suffered from acute landlessness during the 1990s and early 2000s, which led to significant distress including starvation deaths among Adivasis in Wayanad and Attappady. In response, activists like C.K. Janu and M. Geethanandan organized land rights movements, culminating in the formation of the Adivasi Gotra Maha Sabha around 2000.

=== 2001 "Build-A-Hut" Protest ===
In late 2001, thousands of tribals under AGMS staged a "Build-A-Hut" protest in front of the Kerala Secretariat demanding land allotments. After 48 days, the Kerala government agreed to allot land to landless tribal families, though implementation remained slow and partial.

=== Muthanga incident ===
On 4 January 2003, AGMS organized an occupation of roughly 5,000 acres in the Muthanga Wildlife Sanctuary in Wayanad. The protest ended tragically on 19 February 2003 when police attempted eviction, leading to clashes that resulted in the deaths of one tribal protester and one police constable. Leaders C.K. Janu and M. Geethanandan were arrested but later released.

Post-incident, the government announced land distribution packages, but AGMS and other observers report that only a small fraction of promised land was allotted.

In 2003, the Adivasi Gotra Maha Sabha (AGMS) announced plans to form a broad front of backward class organizations to fight for tribal rights. Leaders C.K. Janu and M. Geethanandan declared a rally for October 16 and threatened to reoccupy land in Muthanga if the government failed to deliver on promises. They demanded the implementation of the 1975 act to reclaim alienated tribal land and called for autonomous status for tribal areas.

=== Chengara Struggle (2007–2009) ===
In August 2007, hundreds of landless Adivasi and Dalit families—under the influence of Adivasi Gotra Maha Sabha and the Sadhujana Vimochana Samyukta Vedi (SJVSV), led by Laha Gopalan—occupied approximately 145 ha of Harrison Malayalam’s rubber plantation at Chengara, Pathanamthitta district. They demanded five acres of cultivable land per family (later revised to one acre) and ₹50,000 for initial farming expenses.

The protest, largely nonviolent, continued for more than two years despite police attempts and court orders. The movement attracted national attention, with notable figures like Medha Patkar and Arundhati Roy expressing solidarity.

In October 2009, the LDF government introduced the “Chengara Package,” a settlement that promised land and cash compensation for eligible beneficiaries. However, most participants rejected the allotments due to poor land quality and distance from their homes.

Although the main occupation ended, hundreds of families remain on-site as semi-permanent settlers without proper titles or basic services. As of 2020, approximately 3,500 people in 573 families still live in the Chengara settlement, many without voter IDs, ration cards, or proper housing.

The Chengara struggle cemented the AGMS’s reputation as a prominent grassroots organization championing Adivasi and Dalit land-rights advocacy.

=== Sit-in protest ===
AGMS continued activism through the 2010s, including a 162-day sit-in protest in 2014 demanding full implementation of tribal welfare promises. Plans to launch a political front emerged in 2015 but did not result in a formal party.

=== Aralam encroachment protest ===
In 2014, AGMS alleged that over 1,500 acres of Aralam farm land, meant for tribal rehabilitation, were encroached upon by private contractors. AGMS leaders accused them of unauthorized pineapple cultivation and warned about the reckless use of insecticides, comparing it to the endosulfan tragedy in Kasaragod. The group also planned a march to the Parliament to demand the return of the land.

=== "Nilpu Samaram" (Standing protest) ===
In July 2014, the Adivasi Gothra Maha Sabha (AGMS) began an indefinite Nilpu Samaram ("standing protest") at the state secretariat to demand fulfillment of a 2001 land-allotment package promised to landless Adivasis. After 162 days of continuous protest, the government acceded to the demonstrators’ demands and the agitation was suspended in December 2014.

By mid-2015, AGMS leaders charged that the state had failed to implement these pledges. They noted that the Kerala Cabinet had in December 2014 decided in principle to enforce the Panchayat (Extension to Scheduled Areas) Act in tribal areas and to allot land to Muthanga protestors, but no concrete action had followed. In June 2015 the AGMS announced it would relaunch the Nilpu Samaram from January 2016, since the promised PESA notifications had not been issued and the one-acre grants remained unpaid.

=== Politics ===
In parallel, AGMS leaders moved into electoral politics. At a November 2015 convention they announced the formation of a new Adivasi Ooru Vikasana Munnani (Tribal Hamlet Development Front) party to further tribal interests. In early 2016, long-time AGMS president C.K. Janu formally broke from the Sabha to launch the Janadhipathya Rashtriya Sabha as a BJP-led NDA ally for the Kerala Assembly election.

=== 15th anniversary of Muthanga firing ===
The AGMS has remained active in highlighting tribal land issues. In 2018, on the 15th anniversary of the Muthanga firing, AGMS leaders (including Janu) observed that “thousands of Adivasi families still live without land” due to successive governments’ inaction on entitlements.

The Sabha also expressed solidarity with other land struggles: for example, Janu criticized the Kerala Left Front in 2018 for supporting farmers’ protests in one district while opposing a tribal farmers’ agitation in Kannur.

=== 2020's ===
Into the 2020s, AGMS leaders continued to denounce anti-tribal rhetoric and demand accountability – for instance, in 2020 state coordinator M. Geethanandan publicly demanded an apology after a legislator made derogatory remarks about Adivasis.

=== 2025 Aralam Farm elephant‑attack protest ===
In late February 2025, residents of Block 13 in the Aralam Farm tribal rehabilitation colony in Kannur district—supported by the Adivasi Gotra Maha Sabha (AGMS)—staged a protest after wild elephants trampled to death an elderly tribal couple, Velli (80) and Leela (72), while collecting cashew nuts, just 600 m from the Rapid Response Team (RRT) office.

Locals blocked the ambulance transporting the bodies and refused burial until Forest Minister A. K. Saseendran and officials intervened. The UDF and BJP supported the protest by calling a local hartal.

Forest Minister A. K. Saseendran convened an all-party meeting, admitted delays in constructing an elephant‑proof wall, and promised ₹20 lakh in compensation (₹10 lakh upfront), temporary solar fencing, additional RRT deployment, tranquilization of rogue elephants, and wall completion within six months.

The protest continued into early March, including a sit‑in (hartal) at the RRT office in Iritty, and concluded on 8 March 2025 after assurances—via MLA Sunny Joseph—on clearing undergrowth, solar fencing installation, elephant management, and interdepartmental coordination.

This protest marks AGMS’s evolving role in addressing tribal safety, human–wildlife conflict, and habitat governance, extending beyond its historical land-rights campaigns.

== Objectives ==
The primary goals of AGMS include securing land rights for Kerala’s indigenous tribes, enforcing the Forest Rights Act and the Panchayat Extension to Scheduled Areas (PESA) Act, and ensuring welfare support such as housing and education. The organization demands formal land title deeds rather than mere possession certificates and advocates for greater tribal autonomy.

== Activities ==
AGMS has primarily used nonviolent methods such as sit-ins, hunger strikes, rallies, and land occupations to pursue its aims. The Muthanga occupation remains its most high-profile action. It also participates in state-wide conferences, public awareness campaigns, and press engagements.

== Leadership ==
=== C.K. Janu ===
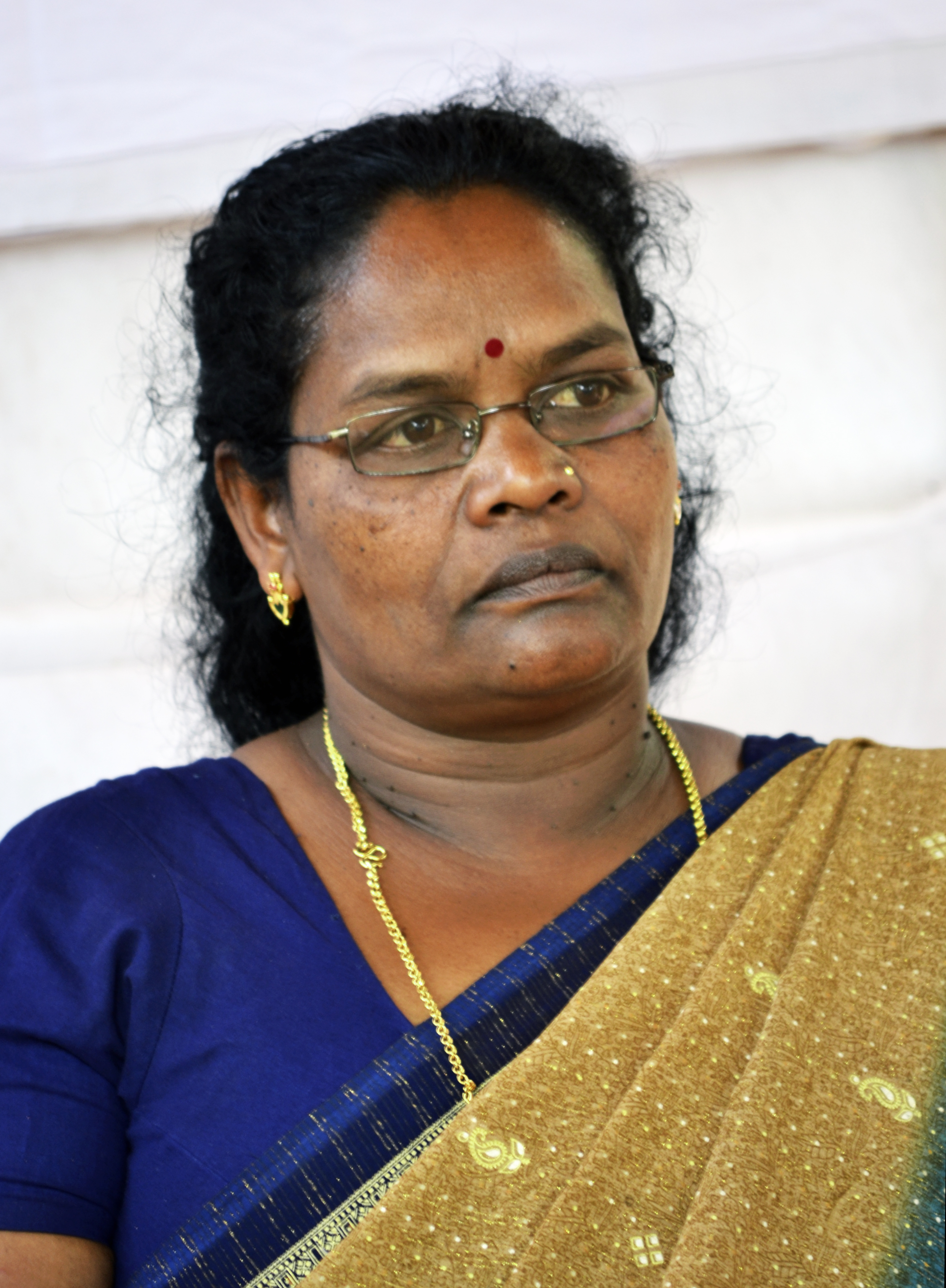
C.K. Janu, a prominent tribal rights activist and founder of AGMS

C.K. Janu is recognized as the Chairperson and most prominent leader of AGMS.

=== M. Geethanandan ===
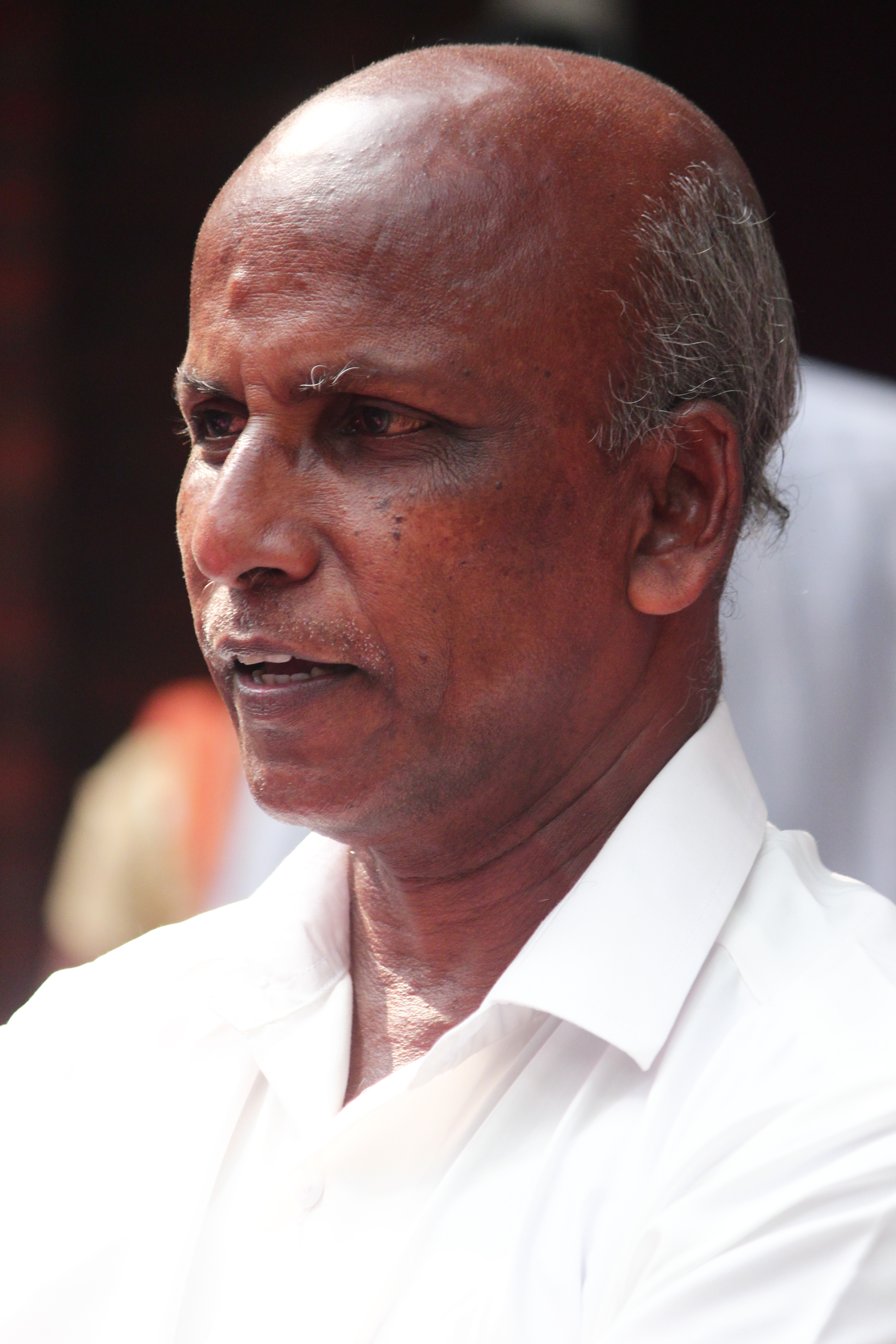
M. Geethanandan, co-founder and state coordinator of AGMS

M. Geethanandan serves as State Coordinator. Both leaders have been the public faces during protests and negotiations.

== Controversies ==
In 2016, C.K. Janu briefly allied her splinter party Janadhipathya Rashtriya Sabha (JRS) with the BJP-led National Democratic Alliance, causing division within tribal activists. This alliance ended in 2018 due to unfulfilled promises. AGMS has faced criticism from political parties wary of its confrontational tactics.

== Reception ==
The group is widely regarded in Kerala as a leading tribal rights organization. It is praised for self-driven mobilization of tribal communities and raising awareness on land issues. At the same time, some government and political actors view its protests as disruptive.

Some activists and scholars have credited AGMS with reviving the Adivasi land rights movement in Kerala through grassroots-level organization and sustained campaigns. Media reports have noted its ability to bring national attention to local struggles, particularly after the 2003 Muthanga incident. Critics, however, argue that the group’s uncompromising stance has occasionally hindered negotiations with state authorities, leading to prolonged stalemates.

== See also ==
- Muthanga incident
- Forest Rights Act, 2006
- Panchayats (Extension to Scheduled Areas) Act, 1996
- C. K. Janu
- M. Geethanandan
- Adivasi
- Dalits
- Chengara struggle
