= Narivetta =

2025 Indian film

- Theatrical release poster
- Directed by: Anuraj Manohar
- Written by: Abin Joseph
- Produced by: Tippushan; Shiyas Hassan
- Starring: Tovino Thomas; Cheran; Suraj Venjaramoodu
- Cinematography: Vijay
- Edited by: Shameer Muhammed
- Music by: Jakes Bejoy
- Production company: Indian Cinema Company
- Distributed by: Indian Cinema Company (India)
- Release date: 23 May 2025
- Running time: 138 minutes
- Country: India
- Language: Malayalam
- Budget: ₹10 crore
- Box office: est.₹28.95 crore

Narivetta (transl. Jackal Hunt) is a 2025 Indian Malayalam-language political action thriller film directed by Anuraj Manohar and written by Abin Joseph based on the 2003 Muthanga Incident where police opened fire on tribals during a land rights protest. The film stars Tovino Thomas, Suraj Venjaramoodu, Cheran (in his Malayalam debut), Priyamvada Krishnan and Arya Salim. It is produced by Tippushan and Shiyas Hassan under the banner of Indian Cinema Company.

Set in Kerala's tribal heartlands, Narivetta's narrative is inspired by the 2003 Muthanga tribal protest. The film analyzes the complexities of land rights, state authority, and marginalised communities.

The film was officially announced on 21 July 2024. Principal photography commenced on 26 July 2024 and was shot in Alappuzha, Kottayam, and Wayanad. The film's songs and original score were composed by Jakes Bejoy. The film was a commercial success, although not included among the hit films under the Kerala Film Producer's Association.

== Plot ==
Varghese Peter, a young man from Alappuzha, aspires to secure a high-ranking government job but repeatedly fails to clear the required examination, straining his relationship with his girlfriend Nancy, a bank employee whose father disapproves of Varghese’s lack of stability. Reluctantly, Varghese accepts a posting as a constable in the Kerala Police where he forms a close bond with senior constable Basheer Ahammed, who becomes both his mentor and protector.

In 2003, tribal protests erupt in Wayanad, with tribal groups demanding land rights under the leadership of CK Shanthi and Madhu, alongside tribal head Thaami. DIG Raghuram Keshavadas is tasked with suppressing the agitation, enlisting the Indian Army’s support.

As part of a calculated conspiracy, Basheer is killed and framed as a victim of the protest to justify a violent crackdown, prompting police to fire upon the tribal group, killing Thaami and five other tribals, and arrest of the protest leaders. These actions ultimately result in the collapse of the movement.

== Cast ==
- Tovino Thomas as CPO Varghese Peter
- Suraj Venjaramoodu as Head Constable Basheer Ahammed
- Cheran as DIG Raghuram Keshavadas IPS
- Jithin Eden Mathew as Sub Inspector Sakariya
- Arya Salim as C. K Shanthi (character based on C.K Jaanu)
- Priyamvada Krishnan as Nancy, Varghese's lover
- Pranav Teophine as Thaami (character based on Jogi)
- Prasanth Madhavan as Madhu (character based on M. Geethanandan)
- Rini .K. Rajan as Varghese's mother
- Nandu as Joy, Nancy's father
- Srikant Murali as Judge
- Sudhi Kozhikode as Benny, Varghese's uncle
- Badusha NM as Kappachettan
- Appunni Sasi as Minister
- Kumar Sethu as Minister Ramakrishnan
- Dr. Vijesh Lee as Army Officer Daya Narayan
- Shahi Kabir as Police Officer

== Production ==
=== Casting ===
Tovino Thomas was cast in the lead role, marking his first collaboration with Anuraj Manohar. Priyamvada Krishnan was cast as the female lead. The film also features Suraj Venjaramoodu, Cheran, Arya Salim, Rini Udayakumar in lead roles.

=== Filming ===
Principal photography began on 26 July 2024 with a traditional pooja ceremony held in Alappuzha, attended by Tovino Thomas and the crew. The first schedule started in Kuttanad, with filming taking place in Kavalam, Pulinkunnu, and Changanassery. The second schedule began on 26 October 2024 in Wayanad and concluded on 18 December 2024. The entire shoot was completed in 65 days.

== Music ==
Kaithapram Damodaran Namboothiri wrote the lyrics for the song Minnalvala, which was sung by Sid Sriram and Sithara Krishnakumar. The original background score and songs were composed by Jakes Bejoy. On 10 February, the team announced that the music rights had been granted to Sony Music India.

== Marketing ==
The announcement motion poster was released on 21 July 2024, confirming Tovino Thomas, Cheran, and Suraj Venjaramoodu as the lead cast. The first-look poster was unveiled on 21 January 2025, coinciding with Tovino's birthday. Two additional posters were released featuring the female lead, Priyamvada Krishnan.

Vormir Studios India acquired the rights to develop and manage the film's official website. The official announcement was made through the film’s social media accounts on 14 May 2025, accompanied by a promotional poster confirming the partnership.

== Release ==
Narivetta released theatrically on 23 May 2025. It was scheduled to release on 16 May 2025 but was postponed by a week. The film had its digital premiere from July 11 on SonyLIV.

== Reception ==
=== Critical response ===
Narivetta received generally positive reviews from critics. Times of India rated the film 3.5 out of 5, calling it "a brave, bold attempt” with an important message, though noting that the script felt muddled and lacked the emotional and cinematic impact of similar films such as Nayattu". The Indian Express praised the film’s technical execution, especially its cinematography and editing. The review described the film as “a triggering reminder of a dark chapter in Kerala’s history” and noted its effective portrayal of systemic tension between the police and Adivasi communities. Hindustan Times commended Tovino Thomas’s performance and the film’s impactful theme. The review noted that director Anuraj Manohar delivered “a hard-hitting drama that makes the audience question the system,” designed to provoke discomfort and reflection.

=== Box office ===
On its opening day, the movie recorded an overall Malayalam occupancy rate of 34.34%, indicating a gradual increase in audience turnout throughout the day. The morning shows began with a modest occupancy of 21.97%, which rose to 28.73% in the afternoon. Evening shows saw further improvement with a 34.96% occupancy rate, culminating in a significant increase during the night shows, which recorded 51.71% attendance. The film grossed approximately ₹1.75 crore at the box office on its first day.

On its second day, Narivetta witnessed a growth in box office performance, collecting an estimated ₹1.85 crore, which brought its two-day India net total to ₹3.50 crore. This marked a 19% increase from its opening day collection, attributed to positive word-of-mouth and increasing audience interest. In Kerala, the film grossed approximately ₹3.35 crore over the first two days. Made on a reported budget of ₹10 crore, the film recovered around 35% of its production cost within this period.

On its third day, Narivetta continued its upward trend at the box office, earning an estimated ₹2 crore. This brought the film’s total India net collection to approximately ₹5.20 crore over its opening weekend. The consistent growth over the first three days was attributed to strong word-of-mouth and positive audience reception. The film grossed ₹15 crore at the worldwide box office in three days of its release.

== Controversy ==
In December 2025, Anuraj Manohar disputed the box office report published by the Kerala Film Producers' Association, which listed only a limited number of Malayalam films as commercially successful. His film Narivetta was not included in the association’s list of profitable films. Anuraj stated that the film had in fact made a profit and expressed willingness to reveal its financial records to prove the claim. He also questioned the transparency and criteria used by the association in determining the success or failure of films.In a public response, he argued that portraying most films as financial failures could discourage new producers and negatively affect the Malayalam film industry. The issue sparked wider debate within the industry regarding the accuracy of officially published box office data.
