= Muthanga incident =

2003 police shooting of protesters in Kerala, India

Muthanga Protest
- Location: Muthanga village of Wayanad district, Kerala, India
- Date: 19 February 2003
- Deaths: 5 (Official)
- Victim: Adivasi Gothra Maha Sabha (AGMS)
- Perpetrator: Kerala Police
- Motive: Eviction / protest

The Muthanga Protest was an incident in Kerala, India, where police fired on the Adivasis (tribal clans) in the Muthanga village of Wayanad district, Kerala. On 19 February 2003, the Adivasis had gathered under Adivasi Gothra Maha Sabha (AGMS) to protest the Kerala Government's delay in allotting them land, which had been contracted in October 2001. During the protest, Kerala Police fired 18 rounds, resulting in two immediate fatalities (one of which was a tribal leader). In a subsequent statement, the government placed the official death toll at five. Footage of the firing was aired on several news programs.

== Background ==
The Adivasi people began to protest in August 2001 after many of their members had died of starvation in Kerala. The protest was carried out primarily by setting up "refugee camps" in front of the official residence of Kerala chief minister AK Antony. The protest continued for 48 days, forcing the Government of Kerala to promise the disbursement of land and other rehabilitation measures for the Adivasi people living in the state.

When no action was taken by the Indian National Congress led administration to make the promised measures, the tribal alliance (similar to tribal groups of the Nagarhole) renewed their protest. The indigenous people of Wayanad decided to enter the forest under the banner of Adivasi Gothra Maha Sabha (AGMS). The Muthanga forest where AGMS put up huts is recognized as the homeland of different Adivasi communities in Wayanad, such as the Tamil Nadu, the Karnataka, the Andhra Pradesh, the Adivasi and the Kerala. Adivasi families had been forcibly evicted from Muthanga during the 1960s after the area was declared a sanctuary and again in the 1980s to make way for eucalyptus plantations. The evicted tribal groups were compelled to live in difficult socioeconomic conditions as part of several other tribal colonies.

The Adivasi families who entered the forest sought to assert their traditional right over the Muthanga forests, by restarting the Adivasi Oorukootams (similar to Panchayati raj) and setting up subsistence agriculture. A minimum program for Self Rule under the spirit of the Panchayati raj was drawn up. Maintaining a self-supporting and regenerative natural ecosystem, primarily with regard to water sources and vegetation, was an important goal of the Adivasi moving into the forest.

As part of the eviction, the Forest Department was alleged to set the Adivasi huts on fire and fed domesticated elephants with alcohol to induce the animals to attack Adivasi huts.

== Incident ==
On 19 February 2003, officials from the Kerala Police and the Kerala Forest Department launched an operation to evict hundreds of Adivasi families who had occupied land inside the Muthanga Wildlife Sanctuary in Wayanad district, Kerala, India. The occupation was led by the Adivasi Gothra Maha Sabha (AGMS) to protest the state government's failure to deliver on its 2001 promise to distribute land to landless tribal communities.

The eviction began around 9:00 a.m. with security forces dismantling a check-post erected by the AGMS to restrict outside entry. Protesters, including women and children, retreated deeper into the forest, where approximately 200 people confronted the advancing forces. Despite repeated warnings and the use of tear gas, the protesters refused to disperse and responded by brandishing sticks, stones, and other makeshift weapons.

Tensions escalated when two government officials—a constable from the Kerala Police and a forest officer—were reportedly held by AGMS activists. One of them, Constable K.V. Vinod, was killed during the confrontation, while the forest officer was seriously injured but managed to escape. In response, the police opened fire, resulting in multiple casualties. Official records confirmed the deaths of the constable and one tribal protester. However, independent reports and complaints received by the National Human Rights Commission (NHRC) suggest that the number of deaths may range from the officially reported 5 to as many as 16, including women and children.

The incident triggered widespread condemnation from human rights groups and civil society organizations. Over 130 tribal individuals—including 99 women and 37 children—were arrested and placed in judicial custody. AGMS leaders C. K. Janu and M. Geethanandan were also taken into custody. Public outcry over the violent police action led to calls for a judicial inquiry and raised questions about the treatment of Adivasis and landless communities in the state.

== Aftermath ==
Following the violent eviction on 19 February 2003, law enforcement agencies arrested 132 individuals, including 99 women and 33 men, along with 37 children. The women were charged under provisions of the Wildlife Protection Act, while the men faced charges under various sections of the Indian Penal Code. All detainees were remanded to judicial custody for 15 days and transported to the Central Jail in Kannur district.

On 21 February 2003, leaders of the Adivasi Gothra Maha Sabha (AGMS), C. K. Janu and M. Geethanandan, were apprehended near Nambikolli, approximately 4 kilometers from Sulthan Bathery, on the Bathery-Ooty road. Additionally, K. K. Surendran, a lecturer at the District Institute of Education and Training (DIET), was arrested in connection with the agitation.

The then Chief Minister of Kerala, A. K. Antony, declined opposition demands for a judicial inquiry into the incident, asserting that the government had already distributed 1,800 acres of land to landless tribals and allocated ₹60 million for tribal housing schemes. He stated that the government aimed to distribute a total of 1,840 acres. However, K. Muraleedharan, then president of the Kerala Pradesh Congress Committee, contested these claims, arguing that there was insufficient land to meet the needs of all tribal groups and that the government's calculations were flawed.

Opposition leader V. S. Achuthanandan visited the protest site and publicly expressed support for the tribal community. Subsequently, the Communist Party of India (Marxist) joined the movement, and the Left Democratic Front (LDF) launched statewide protests demanding a judicial inquiry into the incident.

The police action drew widespread condemnation from Kerala's intellectual and literary circles, leading to large-scale demonstrations in solidarity with the protesters.

On 24 February 2003, social activist A. Vasu reported that AGMS leaders C. K. Janu and M. Geethanandan claimed nearly 15 individuals were fatally wounded during the police firing. In response, the government officially stated that the death toll was five.

On 7 March 2023, the Pinarayi Vijayan-led LDF government fulfilled its promise by distributing land titles (pattas) to 37 families, the final batch among the 283 families involved in the Muthanga struggle, granting them land for habitation and cultivation.

The United Democratic Front (UDF) government was held responsible for the firing in Muthanga. It is widely acknowledged that then Forest Minister K. Sudhakaran played a significant role in the incident. However, The firing was carried out with the support—or at least the tacit approval—of most major political parties in Kerala. Two days before the incident, several political parties had called for a hartal demanding the eviction of the Adivasis from the Muthanga forests.

According to Down To Earth, political parties "of all hues and pretensions victimized the adivasis with legal devices and sloganeering contrivances," indicating a broader consensus or complicity in the actions leading up to the incident.While some political leaders and civil society groups criticized the government's handling of the situation, the initial eviction operation and the subsequent police action were not strongly opposed by most political parties, suggesting a general political backing for the eviction.

The incident brought to the forefront tensions between environmental conservation efforts and indigenous rights. While the Central Empowered Committee (CEC) and The Ministry of Environment and Forests (MoEF) advocated for the eviction of Adivasi communities from protected forest areas, this approach faced criticism for overlooking the human rights of the tribal populations. A report in Down To Earth highlighted that the CEC, influenced by a Delhi-based NGO, urged the Kerala government to act swiftly against the forest dwellers, leading to concerns about the lack of consideration for the Adivasis' rights and the potential for peaceful resolution.

Justice V.R. Krishna Iyer, in a preliminary report on the incident, condemned the police action as "excessive and totally unwarranted," highlighting that the government had failed to respond to the tribal protest through peaceful means. He further criticized political parties for exploiting the situation for political gain, stating that "polemical politics sleeplessly waits for such occasions," and accused both the ruling and opposition fronts of victimizing the Adivasis through legal and political maneuvers.

== Government Response and Reforms ==
The 2003 Muthanga incident, where police action resulted in the deaths of tribal protesters, catalyzed significant policy shifts in Kerala concerning tribal land rights and welfare. The incident drew widespread condemnation and highlighted the systemic neglect faced by Adivasi communities.

=== Immediate Aftermath and Policy Commitments ===
In the wake of the incident, the Kerala government faced intense scrutiny. The Adivasi Gothra Maha Sabha (AGMS), leading the protests, had previously secured a seven-point agreement with the government in 2001, which included promises of land allocation and the implementation of the Panchayats (Extension to Scheduled Areas) Act (PESA), 1996. However, delays in fulfilling these promises led to the Muthanga protest. Following the incident, the government reiterated its commitment to these promises, including the distribution of land and the withdrawal of cases against protestors.

=== Land Distribution Initiatives ===
Subsequent administrations undertook measures to address landlessness among tribal communities. In 2004, the Union Ministry of Environment and Forests permitted the distribution of 7,840 hectares of degraded forest land to Adivasis. By 2014, the state government had distributed approximately 3,588.4 hectares to 6,841 tribal families. However, challenges persisted, including inadequate infrastructure in rehabilitation areas and issues with land encroachment.

=== Implementation of PESA and Rehabilitation Packages ===
In December 2014, after prolonged protests by AGMS, the Kerala Cabinet led by Oommen Chandy approved the implementation of PESA in tribal-dominated panchayats, starting with Idamalakkudi and Aralam. The AGMS led by Janu ended a five-month ‘standing protest’ before the State Secretariat after the Congress-led government agreed to allocate land for all homeless tribal families Chief Minister Oommen Chandy said the mediation by Medha Patkar helped to reach a consensus with the agitators Additionally, the government announced a comprehensive rehabilitation package for Muthanga protest participants, which included the distribution of one acre of land and financial assistance of ₹2.5 lakh for housing to each of the 447 families involved. Children who were jailed during the protest were to receive compensation of ₹1 lakh each.

=== Continued Efforts and Challenges ===
Despite these initiatives, implementation faced delays and challenges. In 2015, AGMS leaders expressed dissatisfaction with the pace of reforms, citing the government's failure to fully implement PESA and other promised measures. This led to renewed protests and calls for accountability.

In March 2023, the Left Democratic Front (LDF) government distributed land titles to the final batch of 37 families involved in the Muthanga protest, as part of its "Pattaya Mela" program. This initiative aimed to fulfill the long-standing demand for land rights among tribal communities. However, AGMS leaders contended that many eligible families were still excluded from the benefits.

=== Legacy and Ongoing Struggles ===
The Muthanga incident remains a pivotal moment in Kerala's socio-political history, underscoring the persistent challenges faced by Adivasi communities in securing land rights and social justice. While governmental reforms have addressed some grievances, activists argue that comprehensive and sustained efforts are necessary to rectify historical injustices and ensure the welfare of tribal populations.

== In popular culture ==
The 2025 Malayalam film Narivetta, directed by Anuraj Manohar and starring Tovino Thomas, is based on this Muthanga incident.

According to the 2011 Census of India, Scheduled Tribes constitute approximately 1.45% of Kerala’s population. In the state, demands for land by Adivasi communities are often associated with broader issues of dignity, self-determination, and socio-economic survival following prolonged marginalization.

== See also ==
- List of cases of police brutality in India
