= M. Geethanandan =

Indian social activist

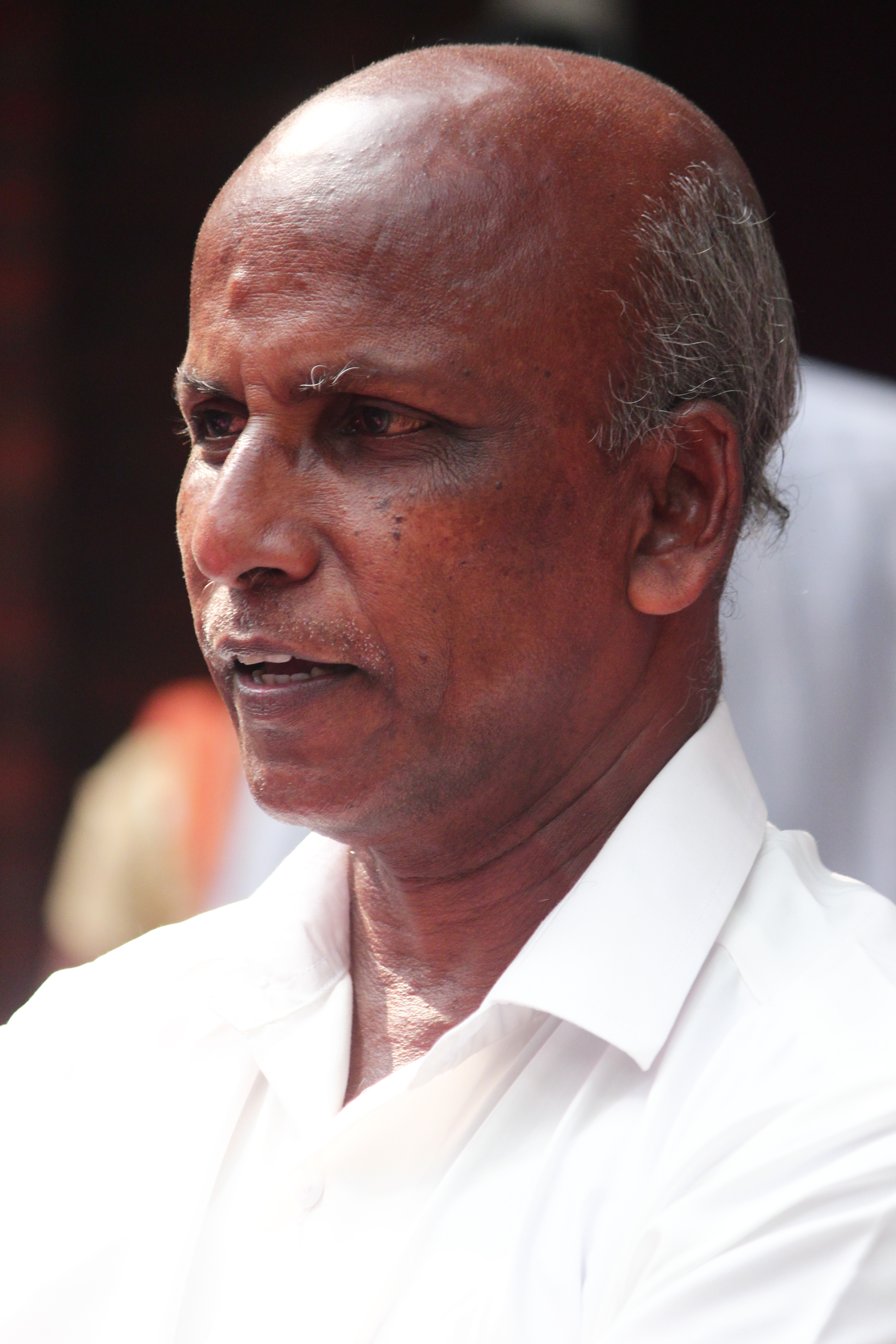
- Born: 1954 (age 71–72); Thayyil, Kannur district, Kerala, India
- Known for: Muthanga incident (2003)

M. Geethanandan is an Indian social activist working on political and economic issues faced by Scheduled Tribe and Scheduled Caste in the state of Kerala, India. He co-founded the Adivasi Gothra Mahasabha s along with C. K. Janu and others. He has been involved in organising several protests and struggles of ST and SC, notably the Muthanga agitation, an incident of police firing on the tribals in the Muthanga village of Wayanad district, Kerala.

== Biography ==
Geethanandan was born in Thayyil, Kannur district, Kerala, in 1954 in a Dalit family. He completed BSc Zoology from Payyannur College and MSc Marine Biology from CUSAT. He worked at the accountant-general's office in the state capital Thiruvananthapuram for about 20 years.

== Kudilketti struggle ==
In 2001, C.K. Janu and Geethanandan led a protest of Adivasis from all over Kerala in Thiruvananthapuram. The protesters erected kudil (shacks) in front of the secretariat and demanded land rights. The protest came to be called as the Kudilketti struggle. The Adivasi Gothra Mahasabha was born during this struggle.

== Muthanga incident ==
On 19 February 2003, C.K. Janu and Geethanandan also led the occupation of land at Muthanga. The occupation ended with massive police violence in which a policeman and an Adivasi person were killed. It came to be known as the Muthanga incident and Janu had to undergo imprisonment and face 75 cases filed against her.

The tribal people had gathered under Adivasi Gothra Maha Sabha (AGMS) to protest the Kerala government's delay in allotting them land, which had been granted in October 2001. During the protest, Kerala police fired 18 rounds resulting in two immediate fatalities (one of which was a police officer). In a subsequent statement, the government placed the official death toll at five. A video of the firing was aired on several television news programs and prompted noted author, Arundhati Roy, into writing You have blood on your hands.

On 21 February 2003, AGMS leaders C. K. Janu and Geethanandan were arrested. The two were spotted by locals at a roadside, near Nambikolli, about 4 kilometers from the town of Sulthan Bathery on the Bathery-Ootty road. K. K. Surendran, a lecturer in DIET, was also arrested in connection with the tribal agitation in the sanctuary.

== Villuvandi protests ==
Along with leaders of other Adivasi and Dalit organisations, Geethanandan protested that demanded the reinstatement of the rights of the Malayaraya Adivasi community over the land and temple in Sabarimala. The protests used Villuvandis (carts), borrowing from the protest led by Ayyankali in 1893 demanding the right to use public roads.

== Dalit hartal ==
On 9 April 2018, various Dalit and Adivasi organizations organized a dawn-to-dusk strike against the perceived dilution of the SC and ST (Prevention of Atrocities) Act, 1989 by the Indian supreme court. Geethanandan co-organized the hartal and was arrested by the State police.
