= Bethel Marthoma Church, Chengara =

Bethel Mar Thoma Church, Chengara
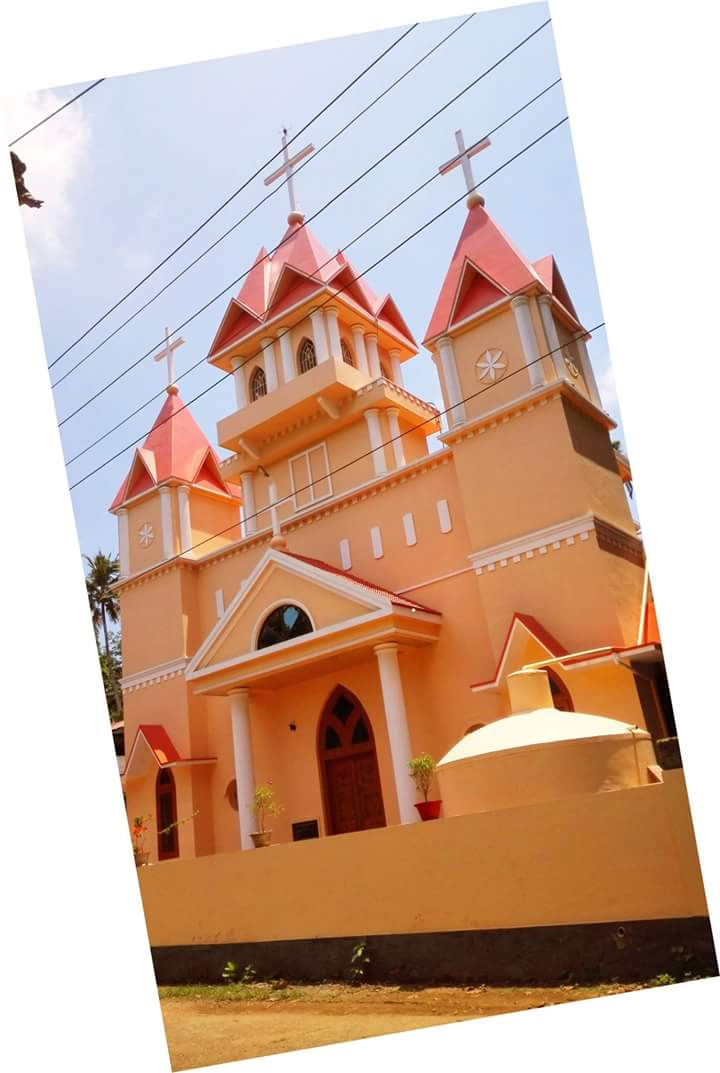
- Bethel Mar Thoma Church, Chengara
- 9.2723°N 76.8537°E
- Location: Chengara, Pathanamthitta, Kerala
- Country: India
- Denomination: Marthoma Syrian Church
- Tradition: Malankara Church
- Religious institute: Parish
- Website: www.marthoma.in

History
- Founded: AD 1978 January 10

Architecture
- Architectural type: Church
- Style: Gothic architecture

Administration
- Diocese: Ranni Nilackkal

Clergy
- Bishop: H.G. Most Rev. Theodosius Mar Thoma
- Vicar: Rev. Sunil Chacko

Bethel Marthoma Church is a Mar Thoma Syrian Church located at Chengara, Pathanamthitta, Kerala, India. Bethel Marthoma Church belongs to the Ranni Nilackal Diocese of Mar Thoma Syrian Church. It is the biggest church in Chengara in terms of membership. Like all other Malankara Churches, St James liturgy is used in Bethel Marthoma Church for worship.

== History ==
Before 1978, there were no church for Marthomites in Chengara. They had to rely on Marthoma churches in other villages for worship. When this became difficult for local population, some Marthomite people of that time in Chengara gathered together and discussed about the need of a Marthoma church in Chengara. It was very difficult for them to build a church at that time because most of them were farmers. Amidst the difficulties they faced, the foundation stone of the church was laid in the year 1978. The history of the church is closely associated with the history of Christianity in Chengara. This is one of the oldest churches in Chengara established in AD 1978. In 2003 the new church was built replacing the old church

Chengara Convention
The Chengara Convention is the largest Christian gathering in Chengara, and is held in the month of January every year and is organized by the Bethel Marthoma Church. The church's parish day falls on the last day of this convention, which is a Sunday. The convention is organized in such a way that it starts on Thursday evening and ends at noon on the following Sunday. It is the tradition of the church to end the convention with a feast. A tradition that Bethel Marthoma Church follows since the inception of the convention. Earlier, the convention was used to be held in the temporary panthal (tent), made by the members of the church. Later when the church was rebuilt, the venue of the convention changed into the premises of the church. Malankara Marthoma Church sends its eminent personalities and Evangelists to this convention to deliver message to the people. Chengara Convention is attended not only by the members of Bethel Marthoma Church, but also by the members of the Nearby Churches, which gives the convention an ecumenical outlook

Genre	Christian conference
Dates	First or Second week of January
Frequency	Annually
Location	Chengara, Pathanamthitta, Kerala, India
Organised by	Bethel Marthoma Church

== Administration ==
Bethel Marthoma Church has a well-defined constitution and has a democratic pattern of administration. All those whose names appear in the register of Bethel Marthoma Church and worship in the Bethel Marthoma Church, are members of the parish. Bethel Marthoma Church has a vicar, elected secretary, trustees and lay ministrants. Edavaka Sangham (General Body of the Parish) takes decisions in respect of all matters relating to the parish. The annual accounts and budget of the parish are also cleared by the Edavaka Sanghom. All its decisions are subject to the approval of the diocesan bishop. Edavaka Sangham members should be above 18 years of age, communicants and whose membership is not banned by higher authorities. Edavaka Sanghom has an executive committee called Kaisthana Samithi. For administrative convenience and fellowship, Bethel Marthoma Church is divided into three prayer groups. The prayer groups are local bodies usually arranged geographically and send representatives to the Kaisthana Samithi. The administrative setup of Bethel Mar Thoma Church is a harmonious blend of Episcopal and democratic methods, and the church is always responsive to the demands of the times.

At the top level Bethel Marthoma Church is ruled by "Mar Thoma Metropolitan". Current Mar Thoma metropolitan is Most Reverend Dr. Joseph Mar Thoma. He is the 21st Marthoma in the line of continuation. At the diocese level Bethel Marthoma Church is ruled by Rt. Rev. Geevarghese Mar Athanasius, suffragan metropolitan. The current vicar of the parish is Rev. Sunil Chacko. Mr. VS Abraham and Mrs. Tessy Abraham hold the position of secretary and trustee of the church, respectively for the year 2017-18 while CM Abraham serves as accountant. Mr. PE Mathai and Mr. Jinson Skaria are the present lay ministrants.

Prayer Groups

For administrative convenience and fellowship, Bethel Marthoma Church is divided into three prayer groups. Each prayer groups are allowed to send one of their member to Kaisthana Samithi as their representative. These prayer groups are divided on the basis geographical locations, other wise Families who stay close to each other forms one prayer group. Members of the prayer groups are gathered at one house belongs to the respective prayer group for a short prayer meeting on each Sunday after worship in church. It is not mandatory that vicar should be there, though vicar attends these prayer meetings randomly.

Prayer group A
Prayer group A consist of all families from the west side of church.
Prayer group B
Prayer group B consist of all families from the northeast side of the church
Prayer group C
Prayer group C consist of all families from the southern side of church.

== List of vicars served at Bethel Marthoma Church ==
Name of Vicar	Tenure Period
Rev. K.K. Abraham	1978 - 1980
Rev. Thomas Mathew	1980 - 1982
Rev. M.C. Mathew	1982 - 1984
Rev. Oommen Philip	1984 - 1986
Rev. George Varghese	1986 - 1990
Rev. Thomas John	1990 - 1993
Rev. V. George Mathew	1993 - 1994
Rev. E. John Mathew	Feb. 1994
Rev. Roy Mathew	1994 - 1996
Rev. T.A. John	1996 - 1998
Rev. P.A. Abraham	1998 - 2003
Rev. K.M. Issac	2003 - 2006
Rev. M.C. Skariah	2006 - 2007
Rev. V.G. Geevarghese	2007 - 2010
Rev. John T. Thomas	2010 - 2013
Rev. Alex K. Chacko	2013 - 2015
Rev. Sunil Chacko	2015 -

== Organisations ==
Various organisations functioning under Bethel Marthoma Church, Chengara are

=== Bethel Marthoma Sunday School ===
The motive behind such an establishment is Christian Education of Children. Its motto is "Come to jesus, Bring every child to Jesus". The Church realises the importance of Bible Study, as essential for spiritual renewal and growth. The opening of the Sunday Schools thus became a natural development in the way of Christian nurture. Currently Mrs. Saly Raju serves Head Mistress and Mrs. Ponnamma Mathew serves as Trustee. Bethel Marthoma Sunday School is responsible for organising "VBS" annually in April.

Vacation Bible School
Vacation Bible School is an annual event, organised by Bethel Marthoma Church through Bethel Marthoma Sunday school. It is a specialized form of religious education which focuses on children. Church usually holds VBS for 10 days during the summer vacation, however church has the authority to reduce the no of days if required. It usually consist of a 10 day long program of religious education which may employ Bible stories, religious song, arts and crafts, skits, or puppet shows which cater toward elementary school-aged children. It usually begins in the first week of April and ends with various programmes of kids on its final day. This typically includes procession through the streets of Chengara which is carried out by the students of VBS, skits, songs, dances etc. When the church introduced VBS for the first time years back, it was the first one of its kind in the region. Along with kids of Bethel Marthoma Church, Bethel Marthoma VBS is attended by Kids of nearby churches as well.

Genre	Christian Teachings
Dates	First week of April
Frequency	Annually
Location(s)	Bethel Marthoma Church, Chengara
Organised by	Bethel Marthoma Church - Through Bethel Marthoma Sunday School

=== Bethel Marthoma Yuvajanasakhyam ===
Bethel Mar Thoma Yuvajana Sakhyam is organized with a view that all the young people in the Church should accept Jesus Christ as their saviour and Lord, and bear witness to His saving power. The Sakhyam provides incentive for the development of the varied talents of young people by organizing studies on topics of current interest, and competition in sports, games, and cultural activities under the leadership of Mr Jinson Skaria as Secretary and Mr. Jerin James as Trustee

Christmas Carol
The most highlighted and colorful event in Bethel Marthoma Church Calendar. Christmas carol is a two and a half hour long event organised by Bethel Marthoma Yuvajansakhyam on 23 December of every year with normal timing being from 6:30PM to 9:00 PM. Traditionally the venue is Bethel Marthoma Church. Although the event is organised under the supervision of the authorities of Bethel Marthoma Church, the event is fully controlled by Bethel Marthoma Yuvajanasakhyam ranging from budgeting to schedule the programmes of the event. Whole expenses of the event is borne by Bethel Marthoma Yuvajanasakhyam. This is one of the most budgeted event of the church. Traditions include decorating church, inviting a personality from other churches to give message, Special Choir, Christmas Tree, Santa Claus, Busting Crackers, hanging stars, putting illumination bulbs etc.

Genre	Christian Celebration
Dates	23 December
Frequency	Annually
Location(s)	Bethel Marthoma Church, Chengara
Organised by	Bethel Marthoma Yuvajanasakhyam

=== Bethel Marthoma Sevika Sangham ===
Every women of the Bethel Mar Thoma Church above the age of 18 years is a member of the Sevika sanghom. Sevika Sangham is the result of our visionaries about the need for empowering and educating women.

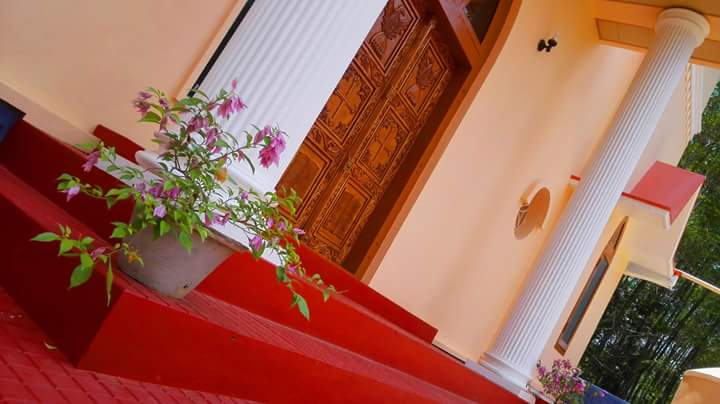
Main Door view of Bethel Marthoma Church, Chengara

=== Bethel Marthoma Edavaka Mission ===
The object of this association is that every member of the Church should be a witness to Jesus Christ, whatever his occupation may be. Those who volunteer to be members of the Association meet together in parish at least once a week for fellowship, intercessory prayer, Bible study and sharing experiences.

=== Bethel Marthoma Choir ===
Bethel Marthoma Church maintains a choir group for assisting the church mainly in Holy Qurbana and other functions

== See also ==
Marthoma Syrian Church
Saint Thomas Christians
Chengara
Malankara Church
