= Abin Joseph =

Indian Malayalam language writer (born 1990)

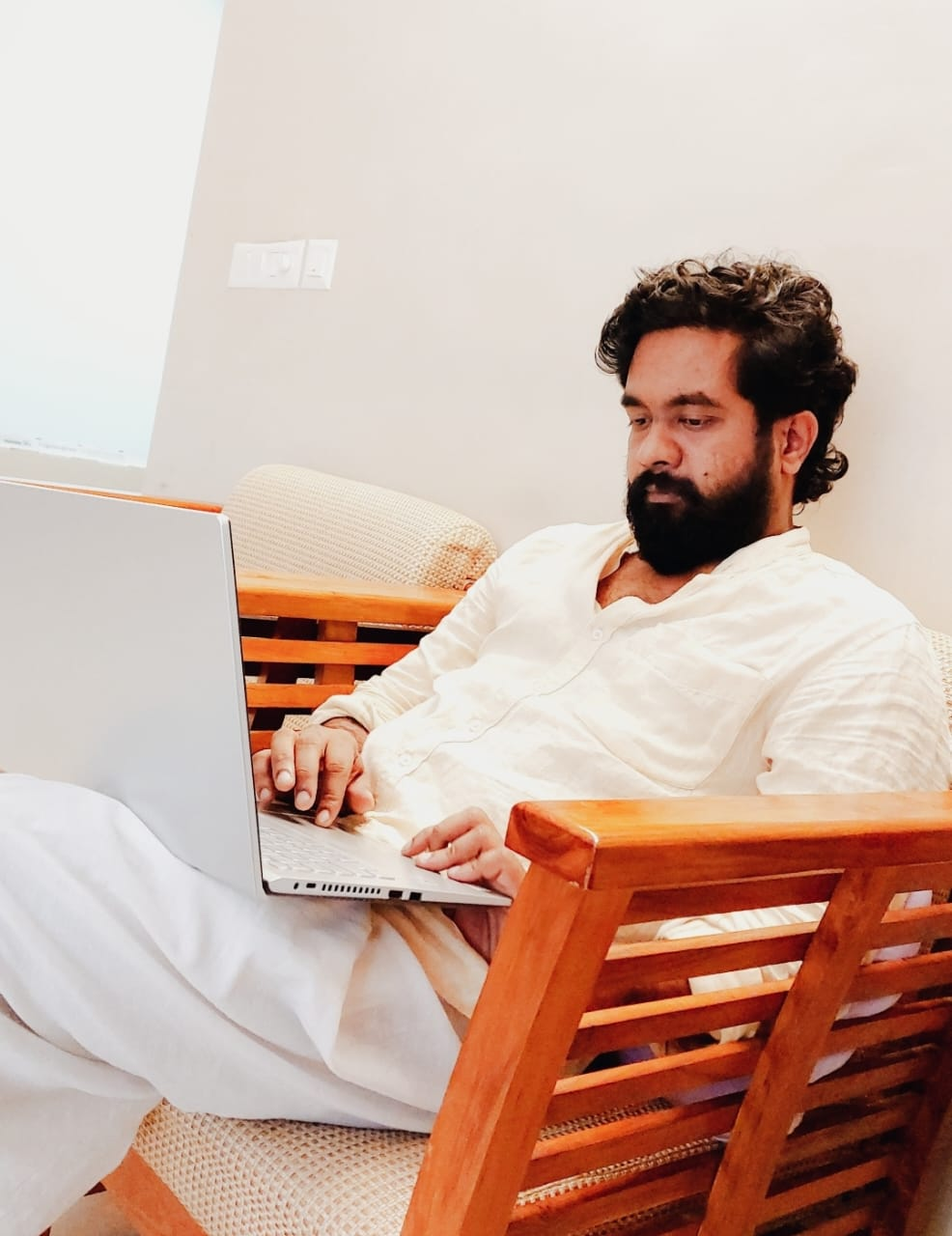
- Born: 26 October 1990 (age 35); Keezhpally, Kannur, Kerala, India
- Occupation: Short story writer
- Writing career
- Notable work: Kalliasseri Thesis
- Notable awards: Yuva Puraskar; Kerala Sahitya Akademi Geetha Hiranyan Endowment

Abin Joseph is a Malayalam-language short-story writer from Kerala, India. His short-story collection Kalliasseri Thesis won many awards including the Kerala Sahithya Akademi Geetha Hiranyan Endowment (2017) and Yuva Puraskar (2020) by Sahitya Akademi.

== Biography ==
Abin was born on 26 October 1990, to Joy and Mary at Keezhpally near Iritty, Kannur district. Abin's family was migrated to Kannur from the Kottayam Kuruppanthara region in the 1960s. After schooling from Idaveli Government LP School and Velimanam St. Sebastian's Higher Secondary School, he graduated from Iritty M.G. College with a degree in physics and a postgraduate degree in journalism from Don Bosco Arts & Science College, Kannur. He worked as Sub Editor of Mathrubhumi Periodicals.

While in sixth grade Abin participated in a story competition and won second place. That was his first story. As he lived in a place of migration, which has deep political roots, most of his stories has traces of local politics and immigration. He lived for some time at Anchampeedika near Kalliasseri, which provided inspiration for his story Kalliasseri Thesis.

He is known for his stories like Kalliasseri Thesis, Sahayatrika, Prathinayakan, Pelayakkurish Satyam, Arrival Chuttika Nakshatram etc. Political intrigue, satirical take on revolution, the issues of caste, migration and belonging, female identity and liberation are some of the themes he explored. He has published articles in Mathrubhumi, Manorama, Asianet and Indian Express online portals.

Abin said in an interview that his work experience as a journalist has benefited his writing. "The journalist's eye is instrumental in finding the plot and getting the story started and ended well," he said. Media experience will also help to edit stories carefully, he added.

He has written the upcoming film Narivetta.

== Contributions ==
=== Literary contributions ===
- Kalliassery Thesis (in Malayalam) (2nd ed.). Kottayam: DC books. 2017. ISBN 978-8126467396. A collection of eight stories, including the eponymous short story.
- Arival Chuttika Nakshathram (in Malayalam). Kottayam: DC books.

=== Movies ===
- Story and screenplay: Narivetta

== Awards ==
- Kendra Sahitya Akademi Yuva Puraskar (2020)
- Kerala Sahitya Akademi Geetha Hiranyan Endowment (2017)
- Uroob Award
- Ankanam E.P. Sushma Endowment (for the story Prathinayakan)
- Rajalakshmi Story Award
- Kolkata Kairali Samajam – Tunjan Memorial Award
- Kannur University Story Award
- Akam Magazine Story Award
- Kalakaumudi Story Award
