= Keezhpally =

Keezhppalli
- village
- Location within Kerala Location within India
- Coordinates: 11°58′24″N 75°46′54″E
- Country: India
- State: Kerala
- District: Kannur
- Block: Iritty
- Time zone: UTC+5:30 (IST)
- Postal code: 670704
- ISO 3166 code: IN-KL

Keezhppally is a town in the Aralam panchayat of the Kannur district in Kerala, India.

== Location ==
Keezhppally is located 14 km from Iritty. The Aralam Wildlife Sanctuary is located nearby.

== Transportation ==
The national highway passes through Kannur town. Mangalore and Mumbai can be accessed on the northern side and Cochin and Thiruvananthapuram can be accessed on the southern side. The road to the east of Iritty connects to Mysore and Bangalore. The nearest railway station is Thalassery on Mangalore-Palakkad line. There are airports at Kannur, Mangalore and Calicut.

== Notable people ==
- Abin Joseph: Malayalam language short story writer
