= Peoples Democratic Party (India) =

Political party in Kerala, India

- Leader: Abdul Nazer Mahdani
- Chairperson: Abdul Nazer Mahdani
- Secretary: V. M. Aliyar Kothamangalam
- Parliamentary Chairperson: Varkala Raj
- Founder: Abdul Nazer Mahdani
- Founded: April 14, 1993; 33 years ago
- Headquarters: Ernakulam (India)
- Newspaper: PPH
- Student wing: Indian Student Federation (ISF)
- Women's wing: Women's India Movement (WIM)
- Labour wing: PTUC
- Ideology: Power to the oppressed, liberation to the oppressed.
- Colours: Red and Green
- ECI Status: Yes
- Seats in Rajya Sabha: 0
- Seats in Lok Sabha: 0

Election symbol
- Boat

Party flag
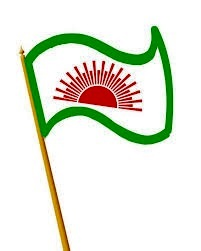

Peoples Democratic Party (PDP), is a political party in Kerala, India. The PDP is known for being the party led by Abdul Nazer Mahdani, a popular Muslim leader in Kerala.

== PDP in Kerala politics ==
=== Alliances ===
The PDP formed an alliance with Left Democratic Front (LDF) in Kerala. The alliance proved to be a disaster with poor performance of LDF. The alliance fell apart following arrest of Abdul Nazer Mahdani in 2010 August by the Karnataka Police for the 2008 Bangalore serial blasts.

=== Parliament elections ===
In the 1996 Indian general election, the party contested seven constituencies. In the 2004 Indian general election, the PDP contested independently from Ponnani (Lok Sabha constituency). Its candidate, U. Kunhimohamed, received only 45000 votes and lost the election, placing in the third/fourth position.

In the 2009 Parliament Election of India, the PDP, which was in alliance with the ruling Left Democratic Front (LDF) in Kerala, contested from Ponnani (Lok Sabha constituency) with Hussein Randathani as its candidate.

=== Assembly elections ===
In the 1996 Kerala Legislative Assembly election, the PDP contested in 50 constituencies. In the 2016 Kerala Legislative Assembly election, the party fielded candidates in 60 constituencies.

=== Local elections ===
The vice chairperson of party, Poonthura Siraj, won as councilor in the Thiruvananthapuram Corporation in 1995 and 2000.
