= Coimbatore Central Prison =

Prison in Tamil Nadu, India

- Location in Tamil Nadu Coimbatore Central Prison (India)
- Location: Gandhipuram, India; 11.013448°N 76.972227°E
- Status: Operational
- Security class: Central Prison
- Capacity: 2,208
- Population: 2199 (April 7, 2022)
- Opened: 1865 (partial occupation)
- Managed by: Tamil Nadu Prison Department
- Director: Shanmugasundaram.G (DIG of Prisons, Coimbatore range)
- Website: http://www.prisons.tn.nic.in

Notable prisoners
- V.O. Chidambaram Pillai (freedom fighter)

Coimbatore Central Prison is a prison located near Gandhipuram bus stand in Coimbatore, Tamil Nadu, India. The prison was constructed during the Madras Presidency year 1872. It is located in an area comprising 167.76 acres (0.6789 km^{2}). The prison is authorized to accommodate 2208 prisoners. The freedom fighter V.O. Chidambaram Pillai was confined in this prison during the freedom struggle from 9 July 1908 to 1 December 1910.

== History ==
The Coimbatore Central Prison was built during the Madras Presidency.

== Prison Infrastructure ==
The open land in the prison is used for agricultural activities by the inmates. The prison also helps inmates to gain knowledge with its library.

== Prison initiatives ==
The prison acts as a rehabilitation center by promoting activities to support inmate reform.

Formal classroom education: Classroom education for prison inmates was launched for pursuing their education in the 8th, 10th and 12th grades. The prison supports the initiative with faculty, books and setting aside three hours of each day for classroom teaching. The intention of this initiative is to provide them with education as part of reformation and to enhance their employability when they leave the prison. The initiative was launched during the tenure of DIG of Prisons (Coimbatore Range) P. Govindarajan.

Music classes and exams: The prison authorities encourage those with talent and those who volunteer to learn music. Six prisoners were to appear for the Trinity Music College exams, some after nearly 13 years of training by NGOs.

Inmates manning Petrol bunks: 20 prison inmates from the prison would operate two 24 hour petrol pumps on Dr Nanjappa Road and Bharathiyar Road. The inmates would handle operations from cash management to fuel dispensing. This initiative is in partnership with Hindustan Petroleum. The inmates would be paid daily wages for their effort and this program is meant to aid prisoner reform and help reduce recidivism.

Upgrading the Weaving unit: The Prison weaving unit used for rehabilitation of prisoners was upgraded. Four Air-jet loom machines were added to modernise the weaving unit at a cost of Rupees 1.50 crore. The prison has a weaving unit with 109 power looms where 200 convicted prisoners work in two shifts.

Prison Bazaar: The Prison Bazaar is a prison program to help inmates sell fabrics and cloths stitched inside the prison to the general public. Also snacks and food items cooked by inmates are sold at reasonable costs.

== Prisoner remission ==
To mark the centenary of former Chief Minister of Tamil Nadu Dr. M. G. Ramachandran, 49 prisoners including many life convicts, were released from the prison. All of these prisoners had served at least a sentence of ten or more years at the time of release and most of them in jail for murder related convictions. This batch release is as per the norms and authority vested with the state governor under Article 161 of the Indian constitution.
