= Janadhipathya Rashtriya Sabha =

Janadhipathya Rashtriya Party
- Abbreviation: JRP
- Leader: C. K. Janu
- Chairperson: E.P. Kumara Das
- Founder: C. K. Janu
- Founded: 10 April 2016
- Headquarters: Wayanad
- Ideology: Dalit rights Adivasi rights
- Alliance: UDF (2025-present); NDA (2016-2018, 2021-2025)
- Seats in Rajya Sabha: 0 / 09
- Seats in Lok Sabha: 0 / 20
- Seats in Kerala Legislative Assembly: 0 / 140

Party flag
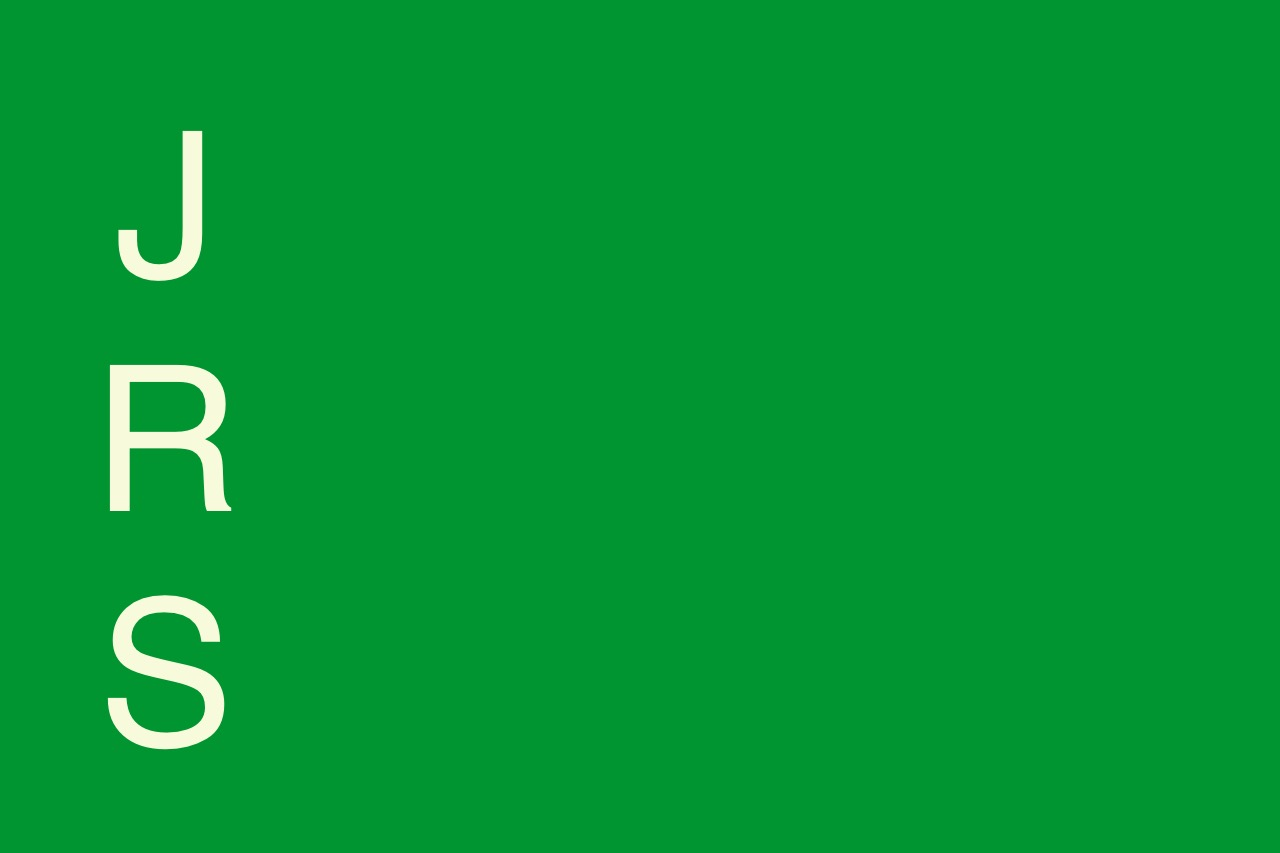

Janadhipathya Rashtriya Party previously known as Janadhipathya Rashtriya Sabha is a political party in Kerala, India. The political Party JRS was formed by C. K. Janu on 10 April 2016. The JRP joined the BJP-led NDA and Janu contested unsuccessfully in the 2016 state assembly polls from Sulthan Bathery. The JRP left the NDA in 2025 and joined in UDF.

== History ==
The Janadhipathya Rashtriya Sabha (JRS), led by tribal activist C. K. Janu, emerged as a political platform seeking greater representation for Adivasi and other marginalized communities in Kerala politics. The party aligned with the Bharatiya Janata Party (BJP)-led National Democratic Alliance (NDA) ahead of the 2016 Kerala Legislative Assembly election, and Janu contested from the Sulthan Bathery Assembly constituency as an NDA candidate and got third position.

In October 2018, they withdrew from the NDA, alleging that the BJP had failed to fulfil promises made to tribal communities and had neglected the party's demands, including the declaration of tribal-dominated regions as Scheduled Areas and representation in public bodies.

Ahead of the 2021 Kerala Legislative Assembly election, JRP renewed its association with the NDA and continued as an ally of the BJP-led front. She again contested in Sulthan Bathery Assembly constituency as an NDA candidate and ended up in third position.

On 30 August 2025, the party, then known as Janadhipathya Rashtriya Party (JRP), state committee unanimously decided to leave the NDA for a second time. Janu stated that the reasons for the withdrawal were similar to those cited in 2018, including the alliance's failure to address tribal concerns and provide adequate political space to the party despite its association with the NDA since 2016.

After initially announcing that it would function independently, the party opened discussions with several political formations regarding future cooperation. On 22 December 2025, the INC-led United Democratic Front (UDF) inducted JRP as an associate member as part of its preparations for the 2026 Kerala Legislative Assembly election. Two days later, Janu met UDF chairman V. D. Satheesan along with other newly inducted associate members and publicly expressed support for the alliance leadership.

In March 2026, JRP reaffirmed its support for the UDF despite C. K. Janu being denied an assembly election ticket.

== Electoral performance ==
Kerala Legislative Assembly election results
Election Year	Alliance	Seats contested	Seats won	Total Votes	Percentage of votes	+/- Vote
2016	NDA	1	0 / 140	27,920	16.23%	New
2021	NDA	1	0 / 140	15,198	9.08%	▼7.15
