= Anuraj Manohar =

Indian film director

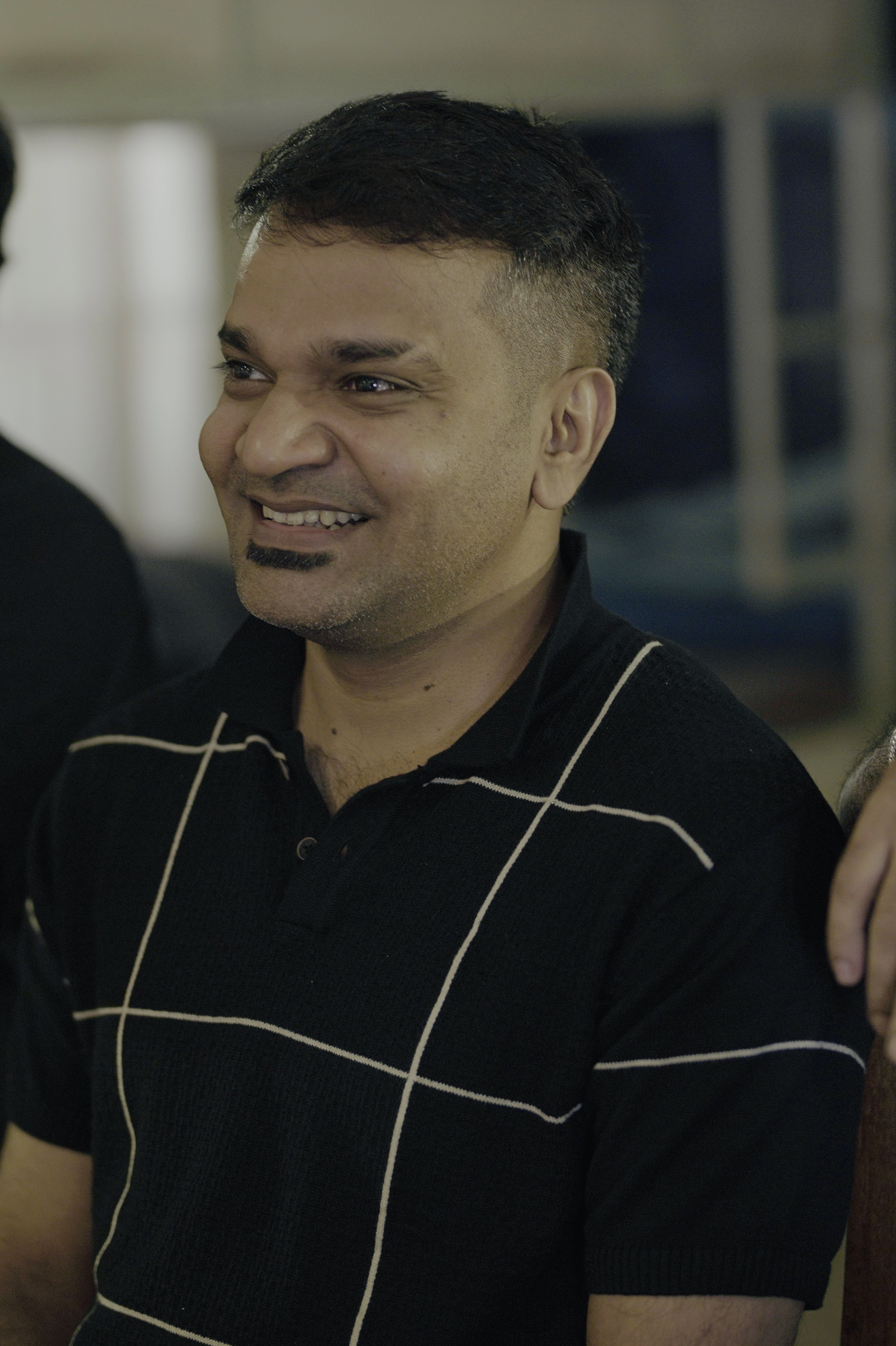
- Anuraj Manohar
- Born: 3 March 1989 (age 37); Payyannur, Kannur, Kerala, India
- Occupation: Film director
- Years active: 2019 – present
- Spouse: Shyamili Sasidharan

Anuraj Manohar is an Indian film director who predominantly works in Malayalam films. He is mostly known for directing Ishq (2019) and Narivetta (2025).

== Career ==
Anuraj worked as an assistant director for the films Pramani (2010), The Thriller (2010), Grandmaster (2012), Pullikkaran Staraa (2017), Kuttanadan Marpappa (2018), Bonsai (2018).

== Filmography ==
=== As director ===
Year	Title	Ref
2019	Ishq	
2025	Narivetta	
