= Chengara =

- Village
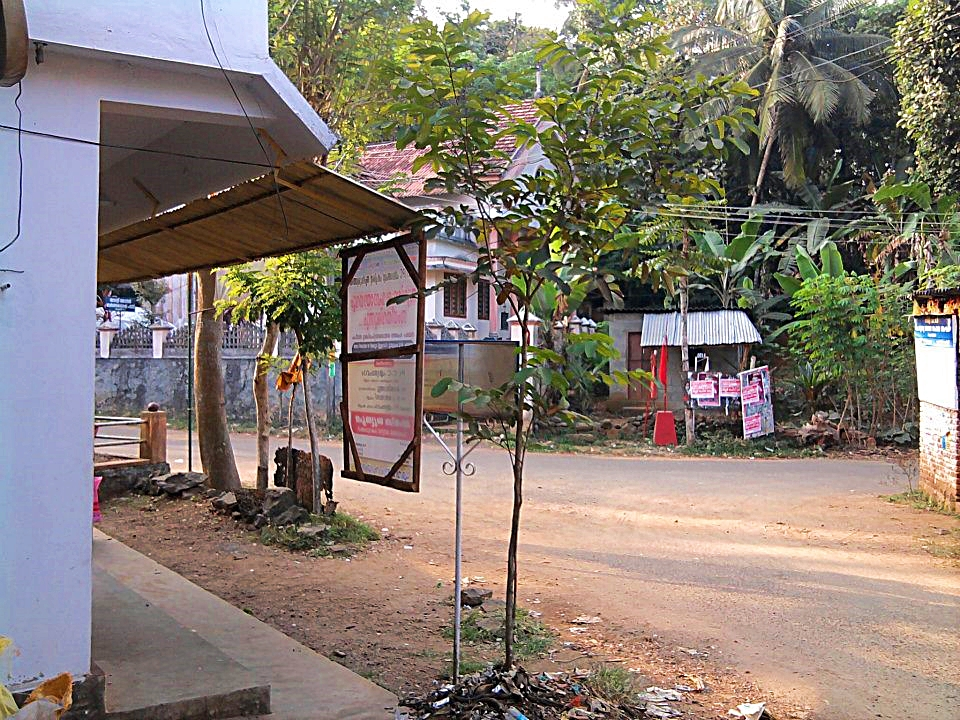
- A view of Chengara Junction
- Interactive map of Chengara
- Coordinates: 9°15′10″N 76°50′52″E
- Country: India
- State: Kerala
- District: Pathanamthitta

Government
  - Panchayat Member: Joyce Abraham
- Time zone: UTC+5:30 (IST)
- PIN: 689664
- Telephone code: 0468
- Vehicle registration: KL-83
- Nearest city: Konni, Pathanamthitta
- Literacy: 99%
- Lok Sabha constituency: Pathanamthitta

Chengara is a small village located in the Pathanamthitta district of Kerala, India. It is known for its natural environment, hills, and climate. Chengara is surrounded on three sides by Harrisons Malayalam Ltd, a rubber plantation company.

Chengara is located approximately 10 km (6.2 mi) from the district headquarters, 110 km (68 mi) from Kochi, and just over 100 km (62 mi) from Thiruvananthapuram, the state capital. The nearest towns to Chengara are Konni and Pathanamthitta, both about 6 and 10 km (3.7 and 6.2 mi) away. Government Medical College, Konni is 3 km (1.9 mi) from the village.

== Climate ==
The village experiences a tropical climate with three distinct seasons: a humid summer, a monsoon, and a moderate winter. April is typically the warmest month, around 35 °C during the day. Heavy thunderstorms often occur in May, during which humidity remains high. The monsoon season lasts from June to August, with the heaviest rainfall in June and July. June is generally the wettest month of the year, which often exceeding 600 mm.

== Demographics ==
Chengara has a population of just over 1,500. The literacy rate of the village is 99%.

== Education ==
The Government Co-operative Society Lower Primary (G.C.S.L.P.) school is the only school in Chengara. The school, owned by the Chengara Service Co-operative Society Ltd., covers standards I-V. The nearest higher secondary school is St. George Vocational Higher Secondary School in Attachakkal. Students from Chengara also attend schools in nearby towns such as Pathanamthitta and Kozhencherry. For technical courses, students attend institutes around Pathanamthitta.

== Economy ==
The economy of Chengara is primarily based on agriculture. Rubber plantations are a major source of income for the local population. Chengara is a significant rubber-producing area in Kerala, benefiting from its hilly terrain, high humidity, and rainfall. Other major crops cultivated include cocoa, coconut, tapioca, and pepper. A large number of villagers are non-residents.

== Politics ==
The major political parties in Chengara are the Indian National Congress (INC) and the Communist Party of India (Marxist) (CPI[M]). K.U. Jenish Kumar (CPI[M]) was the Member of the Legislative Assembly (MLA) for the M.L.A. of Konni, which includes Chengara, as of 2019. Anto Antony is the Member of Parliament (MP) for the Pathanamthitta constituency, which includes the Chengara area. Chengara belongs to the Konni gram panchayat (village council). The current panchayat member for Chengara is N. N. Rajappan of INC. Chengara Surendran, MP (Communist Party of India), is also a native of Chengara. Chengara Surendran (born 31 January 1968) was a member of the 14th Lok Sabha of India, representing the Adoor constituency of Kerala. He is a member of the Communist Party of India (CPI).

Traditionally, Chengara has been an INC stronghold. Kerala Congress also has a presence in the village. Abraham Vazhayil (District Secretary, Kerala Congress (M); Chairman, UDF Konni Constituency) is another native of Chengara. Despite a long political tradition, there has been no significant conflict among the different political parties in the village.

== Culture ==
=== Religion ===
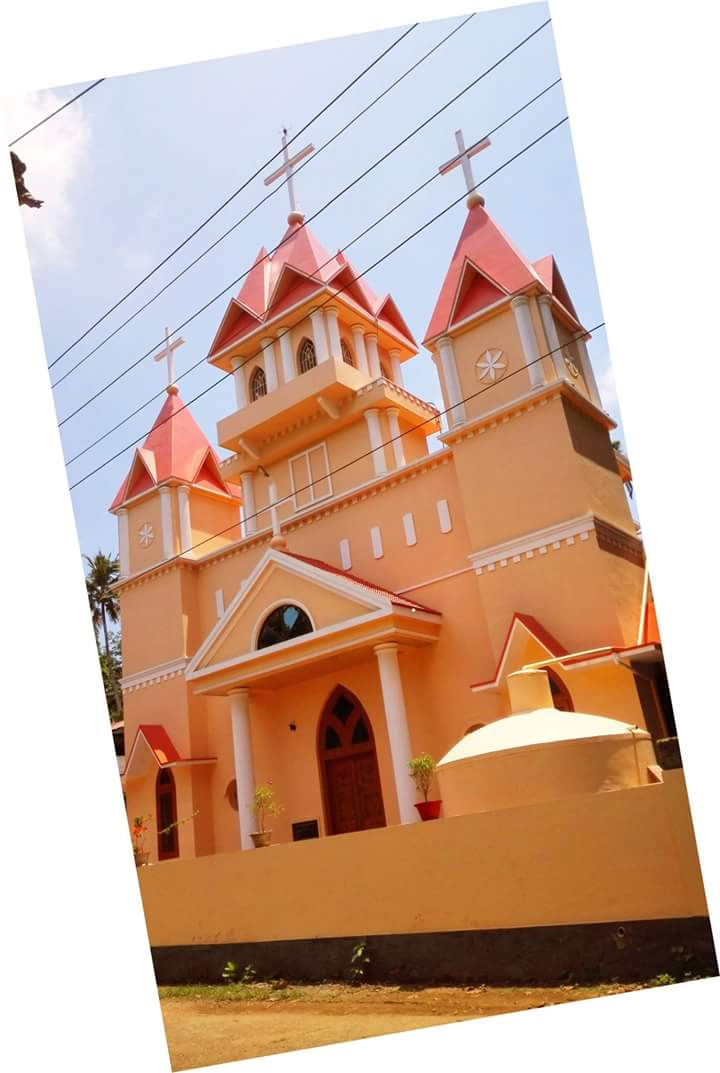
Bethel Marthoma Church, Chengara

The people of Chengara follow various religions, with Christianity and Hinduism being the most prominent. Churches in the village include Bethel Marthoma Church, St. George Orthodox Church Chengara (also known as Chengara Pally, established in 1979), St. Patrick's Malankara Catholic Church, Bethel Brethren Assembly, and Pentecost Church (IPC). The Hindu temple in the village is Chengara Shiva Parvati Temple.

Bethel Marthoma Church organizes an annual Chengara Convention in January. Bethel Marthoma Church, Chengara, belongs to the Ranni-Nilackal Diocese of the Malankara Marthoma Syrian Church.

St. George Orthodox Church, Chengara (Chengara Pally or ചെങ്ങറ പള്ളി) is an ancient church in Chengara, also known as Chengara Pally. It serves as the headquarters of the Thumpamon Diocese of the Malankara Orthodox Syrian Church.

=== Feast of St. George ===
The Feast of St. George, the patron saint of St. George Orthodox Church, is celebrated annually from May 1 to 5.

== Sports ==
Cricket is the most popular sport in the village. An annual cricket tournament is held during the midsummer vacation. Other popular sports include football, volleyball, and badminton.

== Notable locations ==
Orakuzhi is a small waterfall located near the Kizhakkupuram border of the village.

Meemooti Thodu is another waterfall in Chengara, considered dangerous due to its high drop over rock. The possibility of damming the stream was explored but deemed unfeasible.

Harrison's Malayalam Rubber Plantation covers a significant area in Chengara, stretching over 3,000 acres (1,200 ha). It is crisscrossed with unpaved service roads suitable for bullocks or trucks.

Chemmani Rubber Plantation covers 300 acres (120 ha) in Chengara.

== Infrastructure ==
=== Communication ===
Several mobile service providers operate in the village, including BSNL, Airtel, Vodafone Idea, and Jio. The village has a cable network providing Malayalam channels and major channels in other languages.

=== Transportation ===
Both Kerala State Road Transport Corporation (KSRTC) and private buses connect Chengara with nearby towns.

The Attachakkal–Malayalapuzha road and Attachakkal–Kumplampoika road pass through Chengara. This route offers the easiest access from Konni to places such as Vadasserikara and Ranni. It can also be used as a Sabarimala route.

Chengara Junction is situated on the Attachakkal–Chengara–Kumplampoika road, which connects the villages of Attachakkal, Chengara, Puthukulam, and Kumplampoika. The road originates at Attachakal junction and ends at Kumplampoika, covering a total distance of 13.4 km (8.3 mi).

The nearest railway stations are Chengannur, 34 km (21 mi) away, and Thiruvalla, which is around 41 km (25 mi) away. The nearest airport is Thiruvananthapuram International Airport, about 100 km (62 mi) from Chengara. The Cochin International Airport is around 124 km (77 mi) from Chengara.

=== Institutions ===
Various institutions located in Chengara include:

- Chengara Service Co-operative Society
- Chengara Pravasi Association
- Chengara Post Office
- Olive Mart supermarket
- Ration shop Chengara

== Tribal agitations ==
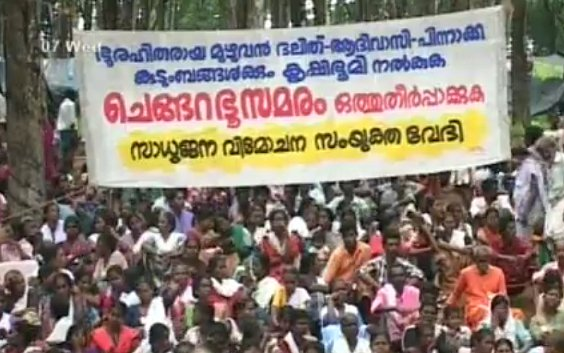
Tribal on strike

The village is frequently mentioned in the media due to a land struggle, popularly known as "Chengara Samaram," which took place on a rubber plantation, 3 km (1.9 mi) outside the village. Led by Laha Gopalan, the Sadu Jana Vimochana Samara Vedi (SJVSV) agitation began on August 4, 2007, when hundreds of Vedi workers encroached upon the Kumbazha Estate of Harrison Malayalam Limited. They demanded 5 acres (2.0 ha) of land for farming and ₹50,000 towards initial farming expenses for each landless family among them. They pitched tents on the occupied land and began tapping the rubber trees for their livelihood. Gopalan claimed that 490 acres (200 ha) of land at Chengara were under SJVSV occupation.

During the agitation, notable figures including Medha Patkar, Arundhati Roy, Govindacharya, and V.M. Sudheeran visited and expressed solidarity with the local families. However, the struggle reportedly created a negative image of Chengara. The previous Left Democratic Front (LDF) government identified 831.03 acres (336.31 ha) of land in 10 districts for distribution among the 1,495 eligible landless people as part of the "Chengara Package." Of the 1,495 identified families, 38 belonged to the Scheduled Tribes category and 1,227 to the Scheduled Castes. However, many people declined the allotted land, finding it unsuitable for habitation and farming. Vedi leader Laha Gopalan maintained that there was no question of vacating the land until all landless families at Chengara were allotted land suitable for farming and habitation. Some families have constructed permanent dwellings and started cultivation on the encroached land. The Vedi has also established a library and school on the occupied land.

== See also ==
- Malankara Orthodox Syrian Church
- Bethel Marthoma Church
- Pathanamthitta
- Konni, Kerala
- Kumbazha
