= C. K. Janu =

Indian social activist (born 1970)

Chekot Karian Janu
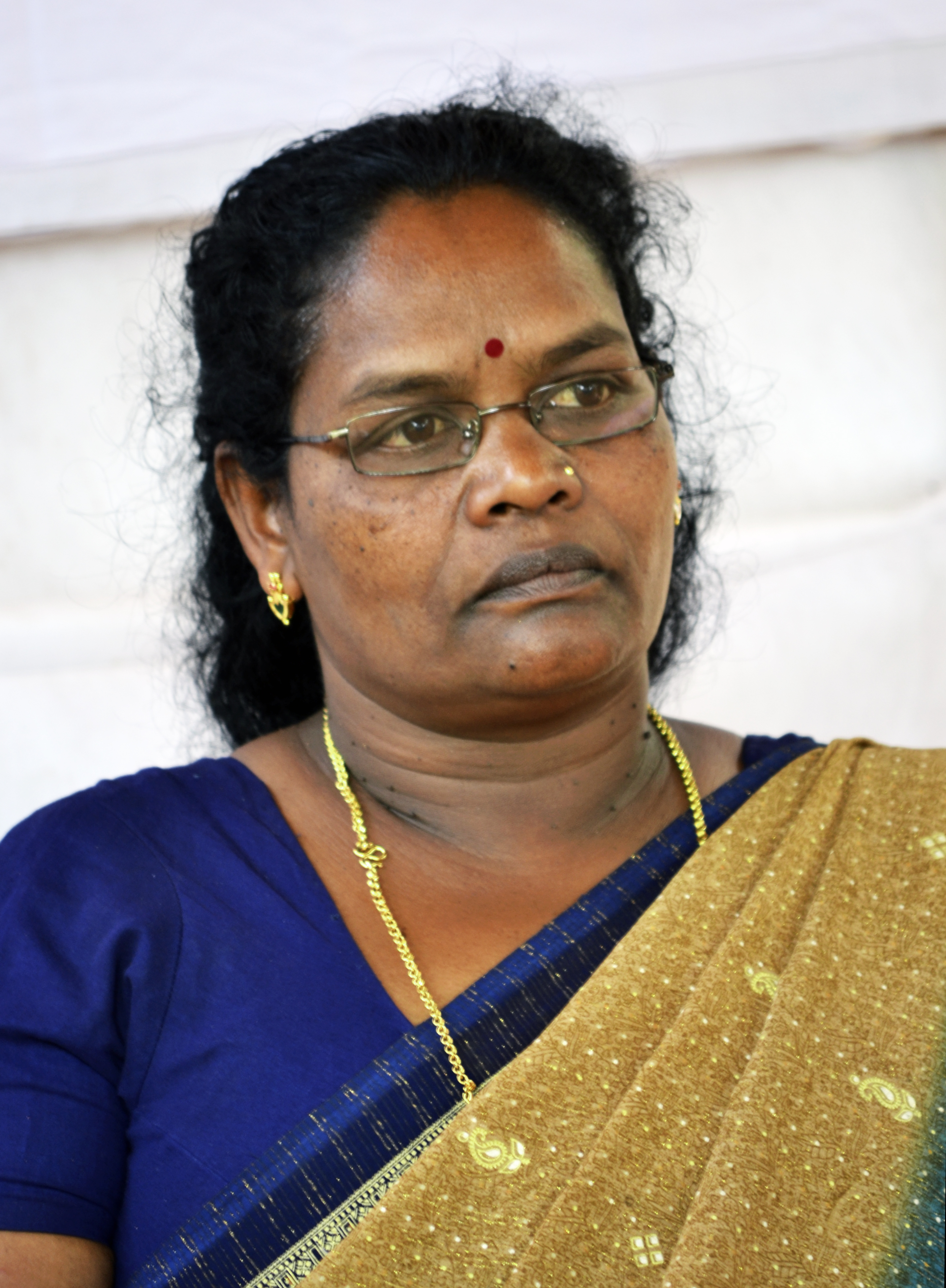
- Chekot Karian Janu in 2012
- Born: 1970 (age 55–56); Thrissileri, Mananthavady, Wayanad district
- Organization: Adivasi Gotra Maha Sabha (AGMS)
- Known for: Sit-in Strike (2001); Muthanga incident (2003); Aralam Protests
- Political party: Janadhipathya Rashtriya Sabha (JRS)

C. K. Janu (born 1970) is an Indian social activist, tribal leader and rights fighter turned politician.

She is also the leader of Adivasi Gothra Maha Sabha, a social movement that has been agitating since 2001 for redistribution of land to the landless tribal people in Kerala. The movement has positioned itself under the aegis of the Dalit-Adivasi Action Council. In 2016, she announced a new political party, Janathipathya Rashtriya Sabha, and contested the 2016 Kerala assembly polls in alliance with BJP, as a part of NDA from Sultanbathery unsuccessfully. The JRS left the NDA in 2025.

== Biography ==
Janu was born in Chekot, near Mananthavady, a tribal village, in Wayanad to poor tribal parents from the Adiya community one of the several tribal groups in Kerala who used to be indentured laborers. Adiya means slave and are mostly landless agricultural laborers. She did not have any formal education but learned to read and write through a literacy campaign that was conducted in Wayanad.

Janu started her career as a domestic servant at a local school teacher's house, at the age of seven, and spent five years there. By the age of 13, she started working as a labourer for a daily wage of ₹2 (3.5 US cents). Later, she learned tailoring and started a small shop, which had to be closed down due to financial constraints.

C. K. Janu was influenced by her uncle P. K. Kalan, a member of the CPI(M), and became a part of the left party. She became an activist through CPIM's Kerala State Karshaka Thozhilali Union (KSKTU) in the 1970s, who led a tribal uprising in Tirunelly forest in Wayanad, and speaking out from personal experience soon became identified as the voice of tribal people. She worked as a campaigner for the union until 1987. She then embarked on a tribal tour to understand their problems and to mobilize them for struggle.

== Kudil ketti samaram ==
Janu's stint with the Communist Party of India (Marxist) helped her to gain experience in party politics. In 2001, Janu led a protest march through the state and held a kudil ketti samaram in front of the Secretariat in Thiruvananthapuram to demand land for landless tribal people which lasted 48 days and resulted in convincing Kerala Government to distribute land to the tribal people.

== Muthanga incident ==
On February 19, 2003, Janu also led the occupation of land at Muthanga. The occupation ended with massive police violence in which a policeman and a tribal were killed. It came to be known as the Muthanga incident and Janu had to undergo imprisonment and face 75 cases filed against her.

The Muthanga incident refers to an incident of police firing on the tribal people in the Muthanga village of Wayanad. On 19 February 2003, the tribal people had gathered under Adivasi Gothra Maha Sabha to protest the Kerala government's delay in allotting them land, which had been contracted in October 2001. During the protest, Kerala police fired 18 rounds resulting in two immediate fatalities (one of which was a police officer). In a subsequent statement, the government placed the official death toll at five. A video of the firing was aired on several television news programs and prompted noted author, Arundhati Roy, into writing You have blood on your hands.

The agitation was deemed a success as, according to Janu, nearly 10,000 tribal families have received land following the 2001 agreement and over 4,000 ha of land including the Aralam farm in the Kannur district has been assigned to the landless tribals.

== Aralam protests ==
After the Muthanga agitation, Janu shifted her concentration onto occupying land at Aralam farm, a huge cooperative farm that the government had promised to distribute amongst landless tribal people.

Janu is sometimes described as the first 'organic' leader of tribal people in Kerala and holds status among notable women politicians in Kerala such as KR Gowriamma and Kunnikkal Ajitha. She is reported to be devoid of abstract political dogmas. She has often cooperated with national and international indigenous people's organisations but was always very wary of being funded by any organization. Most of the activities of the Adivasi Gothra Maha Sabha are funded entirely through the solidarity of poor tribal people and former untouchables.

== Mother Forest: The Unfinished Story of CK Janu ==
An autobiography, a small book consisting of only 56 pages, 'Janu: The Life Story of CK Janu, was published in Malayalam by DC Books in 2003. The book was later translated into English by N Ravi Shankar under the name, Mother Forest: The Unfinished Story of CK Janu.

== Personal life ==
C. K. Janu is a single mother. The tribal leader adopted a three-year-old daughter from Bilaspur in Chhattisgarh and named her as C. K. Janaki. The mother and daughter stay at Panavally with Janu's mother and sister.
