= Wayanad Wildlife Sanctuary =

Wildlife sanctuary in India

- IUCN category IV (habitat/species management area)
- Location within Kerala Location within India
- Interactive map of Wayanad Wildlife Sanctuary
- Location: Wayanad, Kerala, India
- Nearest town: Sultan Battery, Mananthavady
- Coordinates: 11.646°N 76.364°E
- Area: 344 km^{2} (133 sq mi)
- Established: 1973

Wayanad Wildlife Sanctuary is a wildlife sanctuary in Wayanad district of Kerala, India. It was established in 1973 and is the second largest wildlife sanctuary in Kerala with an extent of 344.44 km^{2} (132.99 sq mi) and four hill ranges namely Sulthan Bathery, Muthanga, Kurichiat and Tholpetty. It harbours lush forests and wildlife such as gaur, Indian elephant, deer and Bengal tiger and Indian peafowl. It is part of the Deccan Plateau, and the vegetation is predominantly of the south Indian moist deciduous teak forests. It has pastures of the west-coast semi-evergreen trees. The wildlife sanctuary comes under Project Elephant. It is an integral part of the Nilgiri Biosphere Reserve and bounded by the protected area network of Nagarhole National Park and Bandipur National Park in Karnataka in the northeast, and on the southeast by Mudumalai National Park in Tamil Nadu. The Western Ghats, Nilgiri Sub-Cluster 6,000 km^{2} (2,300 sq mi), including all of the sanctuary, was under consideration by the World Heritage Committee for selection as a World Heritage Site.

== History ==
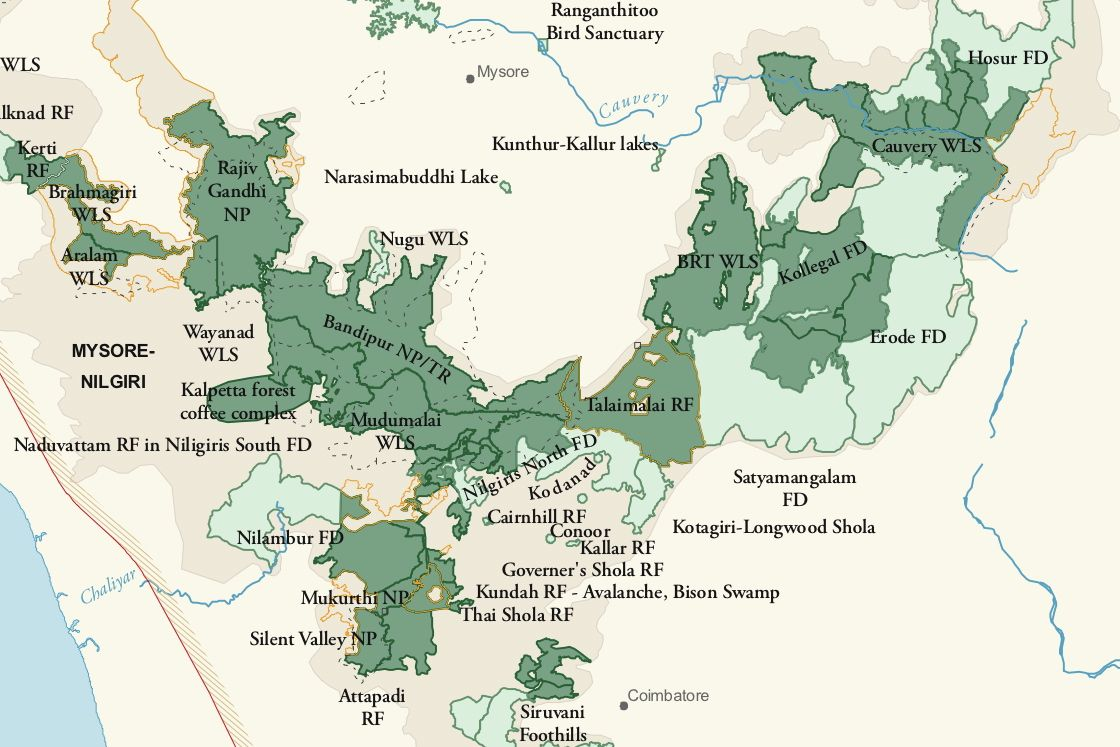
Map of Nilgiris Biosphere Reserve, showing Wayanad Wildlife Sanctuary in relation to multiple contiguous protected areas

Wayanad Wildlife Sanctuary was formed in 1973 and was brought under the Project Elephant in 1991–92. This sanctuary occupies an area of 345 km^{2}. It is the second largest one in the state of Kerala. The sanctuary is separated into two disconnected parts known as the North Wayanad Wildlife Sanctuary and South Wayanad Wildlife Sanctuary. The area in between the two parts was originally a forest region, though it is now occupied majorly by plantations.

In 2012, a tiger was shot dead by the Kerala Forest Department on a coffee plantation on the fringes of the Wayanad Wildlife Sanctuary. Many local political leaders applauded the killing of the tiger. Chief Wildlife Warden of Kerala ordered the hunt for the animal after mass protests erupted as the tiger had been carrying away domestic animals.

== Flora and fauna ==
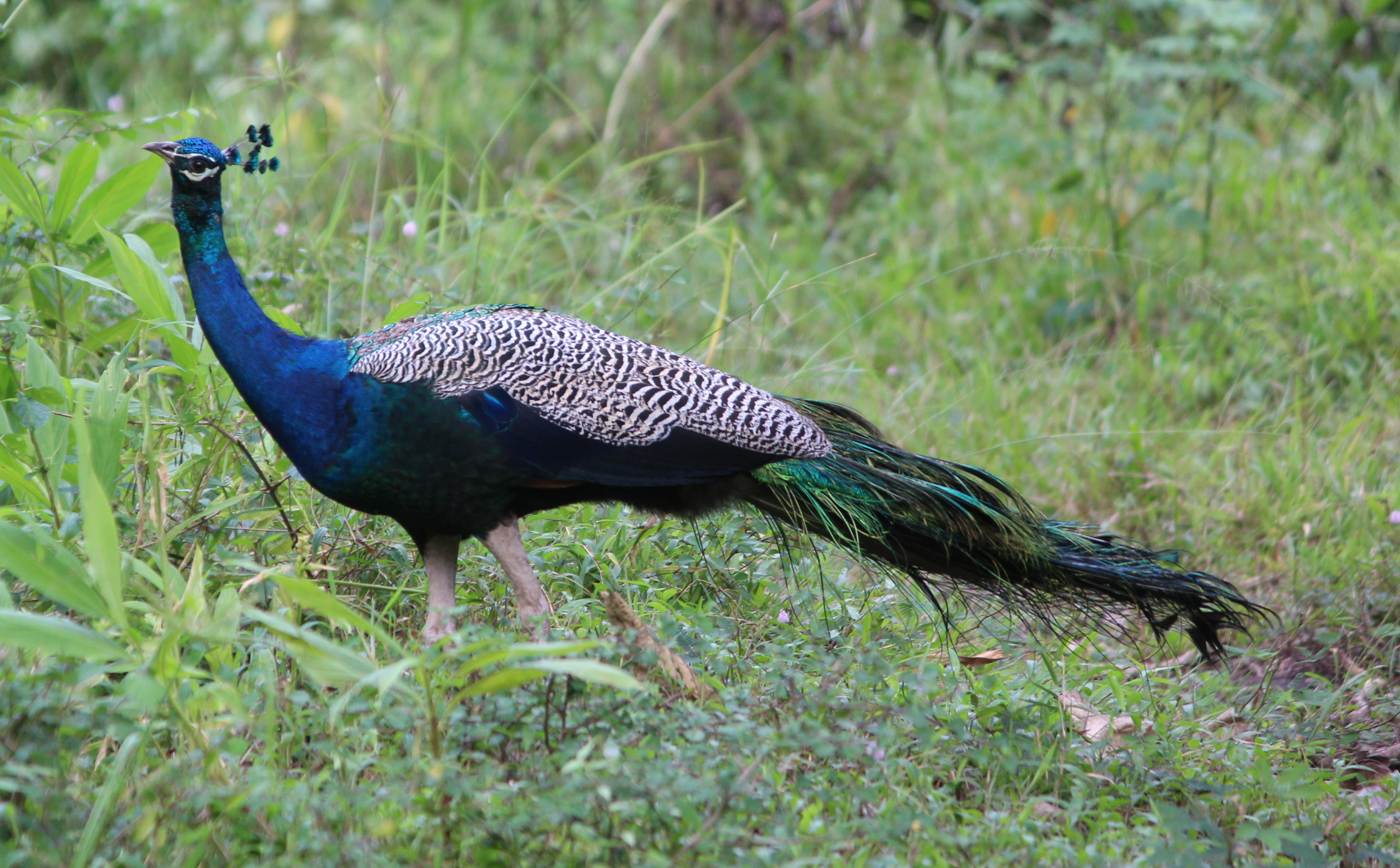
Indian peafowl in Tholpetty area

Flora: Moist deciduous forest consists of maruthi, karimaruthi, rosewood, venteak, vengal, chadachi, mazhukanjiram, bamboos, more, while the semi-evergreen patches comprise veteria indica, lagerstroemia lanceolata, terminalia paniculata.

Fauna: Indian elephant, Bengal tiger, Indian leopard, jungle cat, dhole, gaur, sloth bear, Bengal monitor and a variety of snakes are present.

Birds: Indian peacock, cuckoos, owls, woodpeckers, jungle fowls are a few of the various birds.

== Threatened status of vultures ==
Wayanad Wildlife Sanctuary harbours different species of vultures like the white-rumped vulture and the red-headed vulture. The collective population of these vultures numbered around 150 in February 2016, and 17 vulture nests were counted. In March 2016, only about 11 vulture nests were seen. The banned drug Diclofenac is believed to be the reason for this fall in the vulture count.

== Also see ==
- Muthanga incident
