= International Management Institute =

International Management Institute may refer to:

- International Management Institute, Bhubaneswar
- International Management Institute, New Delhi
- International Management Institute, (ILO), (1922–1934)
- International Management Institute, (Alcan), Geneva, merged into the International Institute for Management Development, Lausanne in 1990
- International Management Institute, Kolkata
- International Management Institute, Kalaidos University of Applied Sciences
- International Management Institute of Saint Petersburg
- International Management Institute, Zurich University of Applied Sciences
- International Institute for Management Development, Lausanne, Switzerland
- IMI International Management Institute Switzerland

== See also ==
- IMI (disambiguation)
