= Quest Mall =

Shopping mall in Kolkata, India

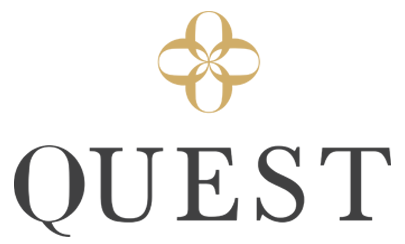

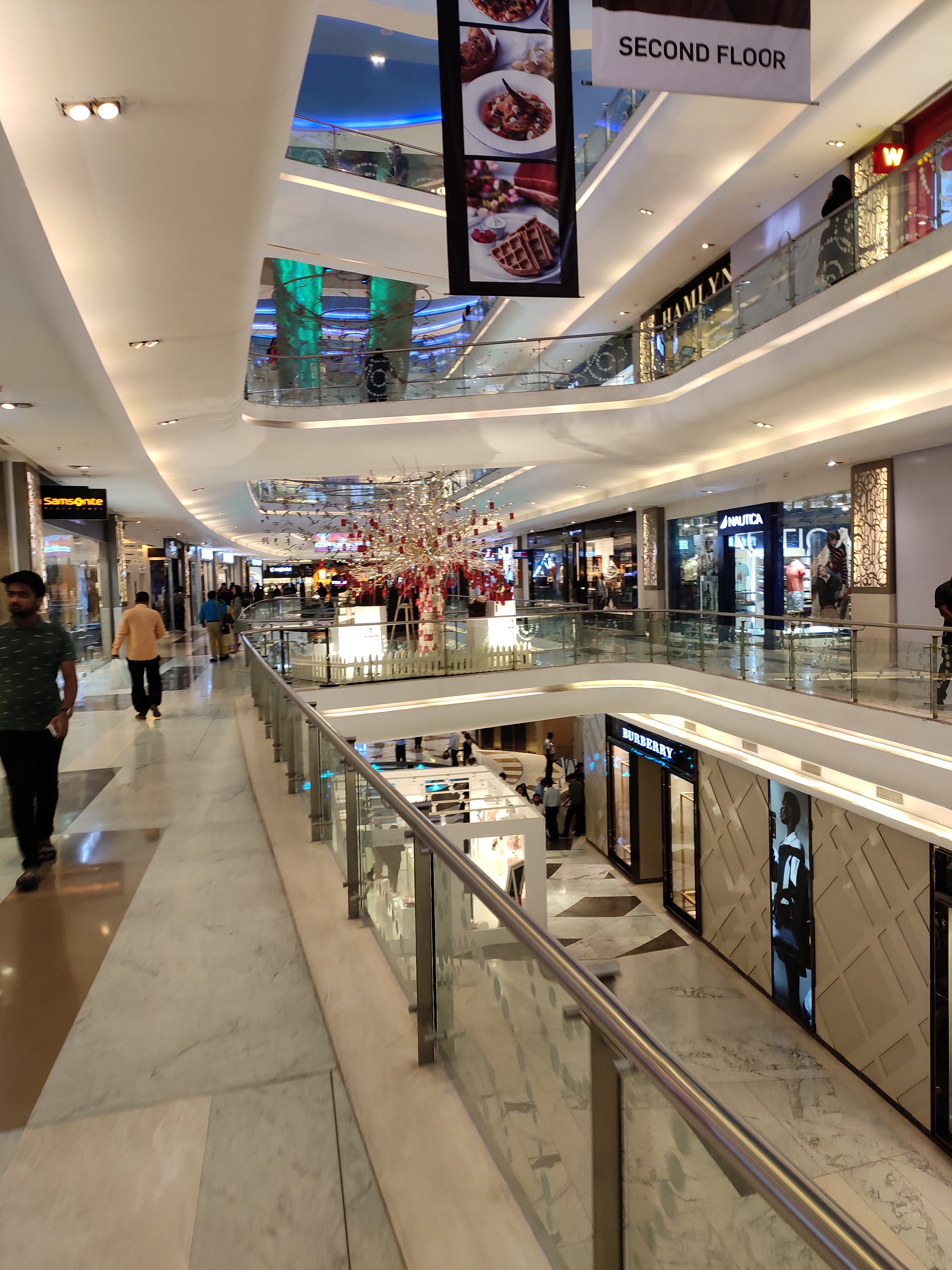
- Location: Park Circus, Kolkata, India
- Coordinates: 22°32′20.7″N 88°21′56.14″E
- Address: 33, Syed Amir Ali Avenue
- Opened: 30 September 2013
- Developer: RP- Sanjiv Goenka Group
- Num. of stores: 155+
- Num. of anchor tenants: 4
- Floor area: 730,000 sq ft (68,000 m^{2})
- Floors: 8
- Parking: 1300 vehicles
- Website: questmall.in

Quest (previously known as Spencers Galleria) is one of the largest shopping malls in Kolkata, India. It is located on Syed Amir Ali Avenue at Beck Bagan, Park Circus. The mall was inaugurated on 30 September 2013 with a gross leasable (retail) area of 730,000 sq ft (68,000 m^{2}) and parking for 1,300 vehicles.

== Facilities ==
The mall has the largest apparel store in the city, Lifestyle, with a total area of 100,000 sq ft (9,300 m^{2}). It also houses a six-screen Insignia class multiplex INOX cinema, Spencer's Hyper Market and Starmark bookstore in the basement. The mall has stores of various luxury brands like Gucci and Emporio Armani.

== Gallery ==
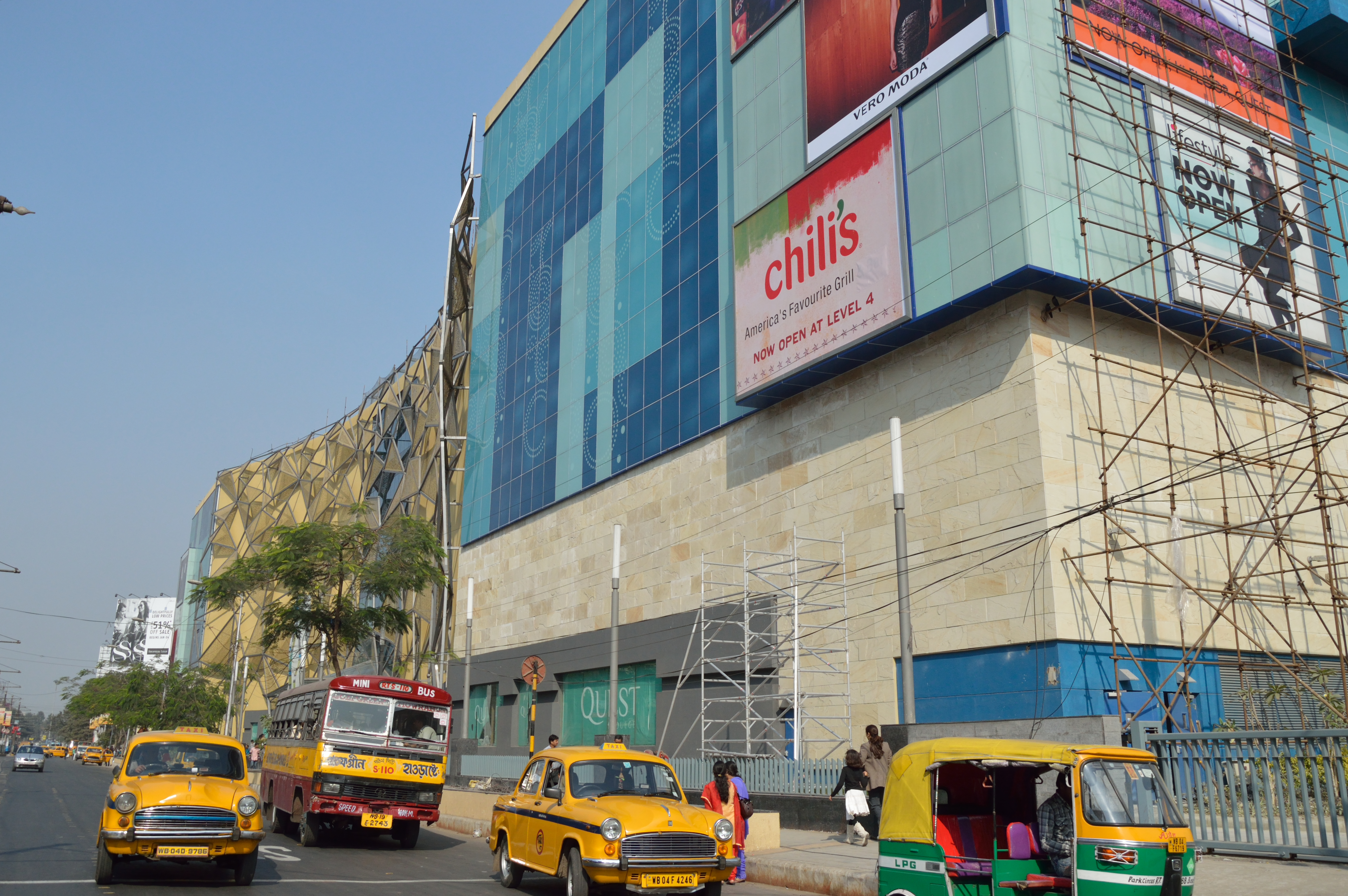
Quest Mall, Kolkata

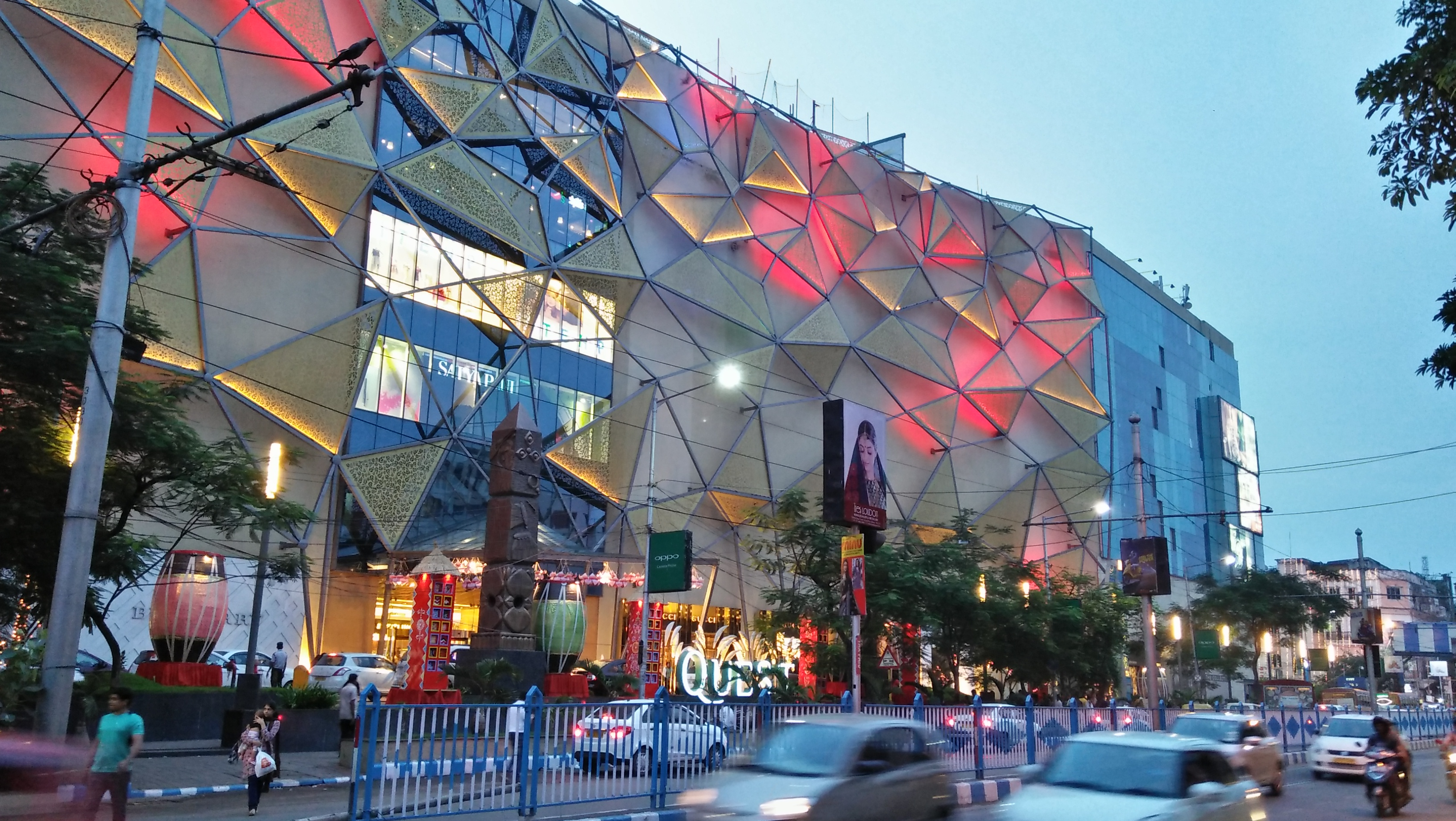
Quest Mall dusk view

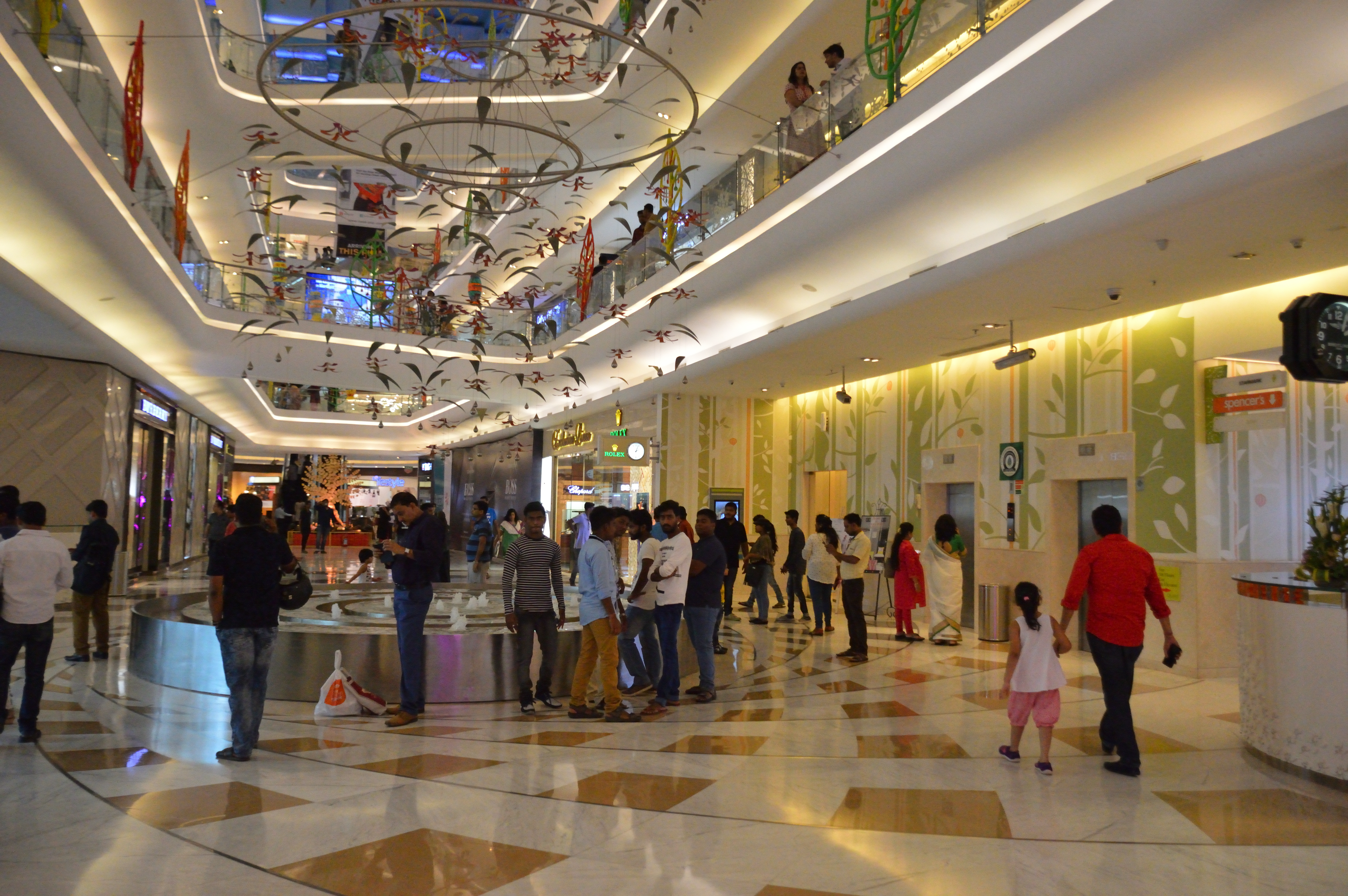
Quest Mall inside view

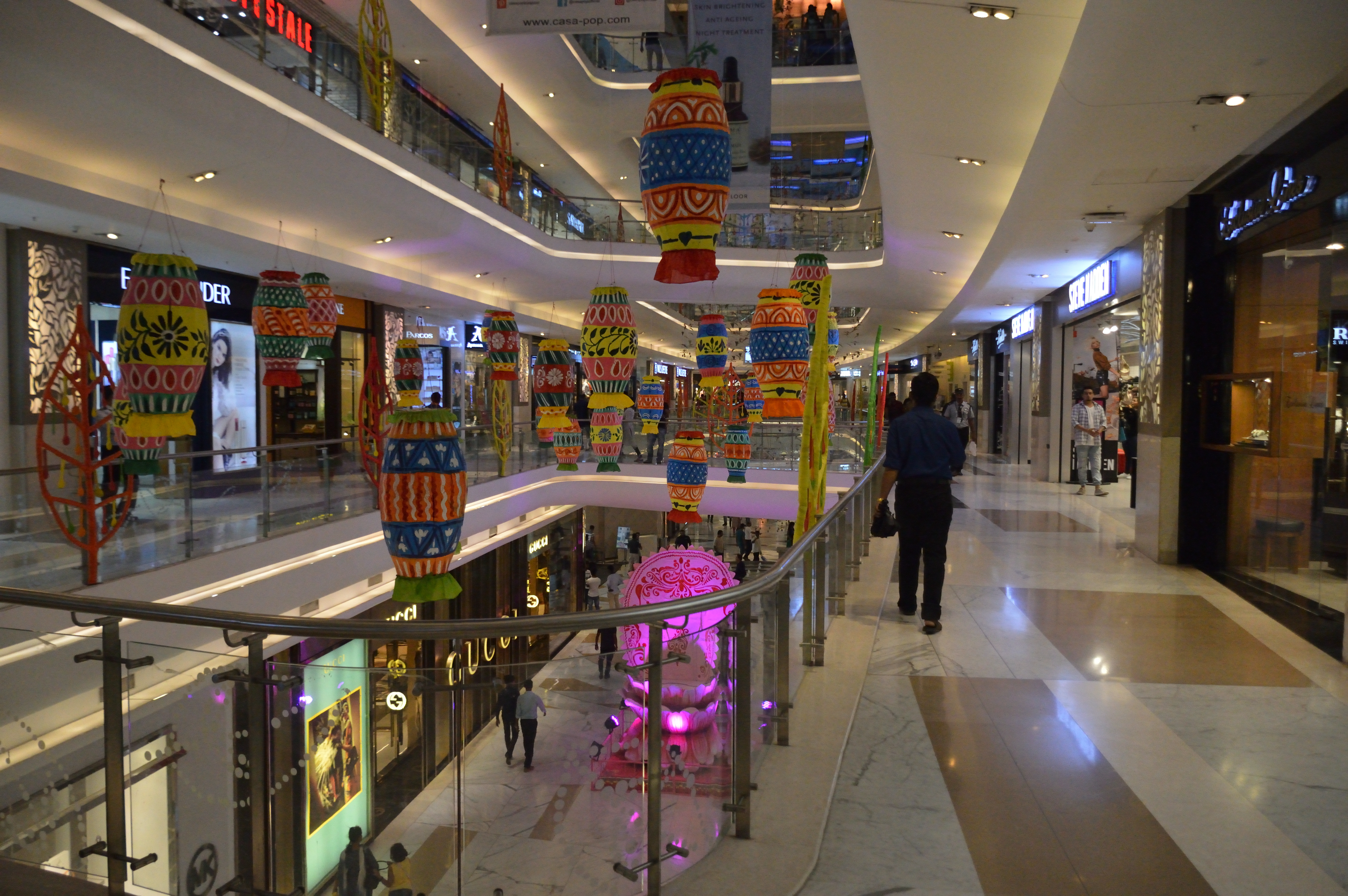
Quest Mall internal view

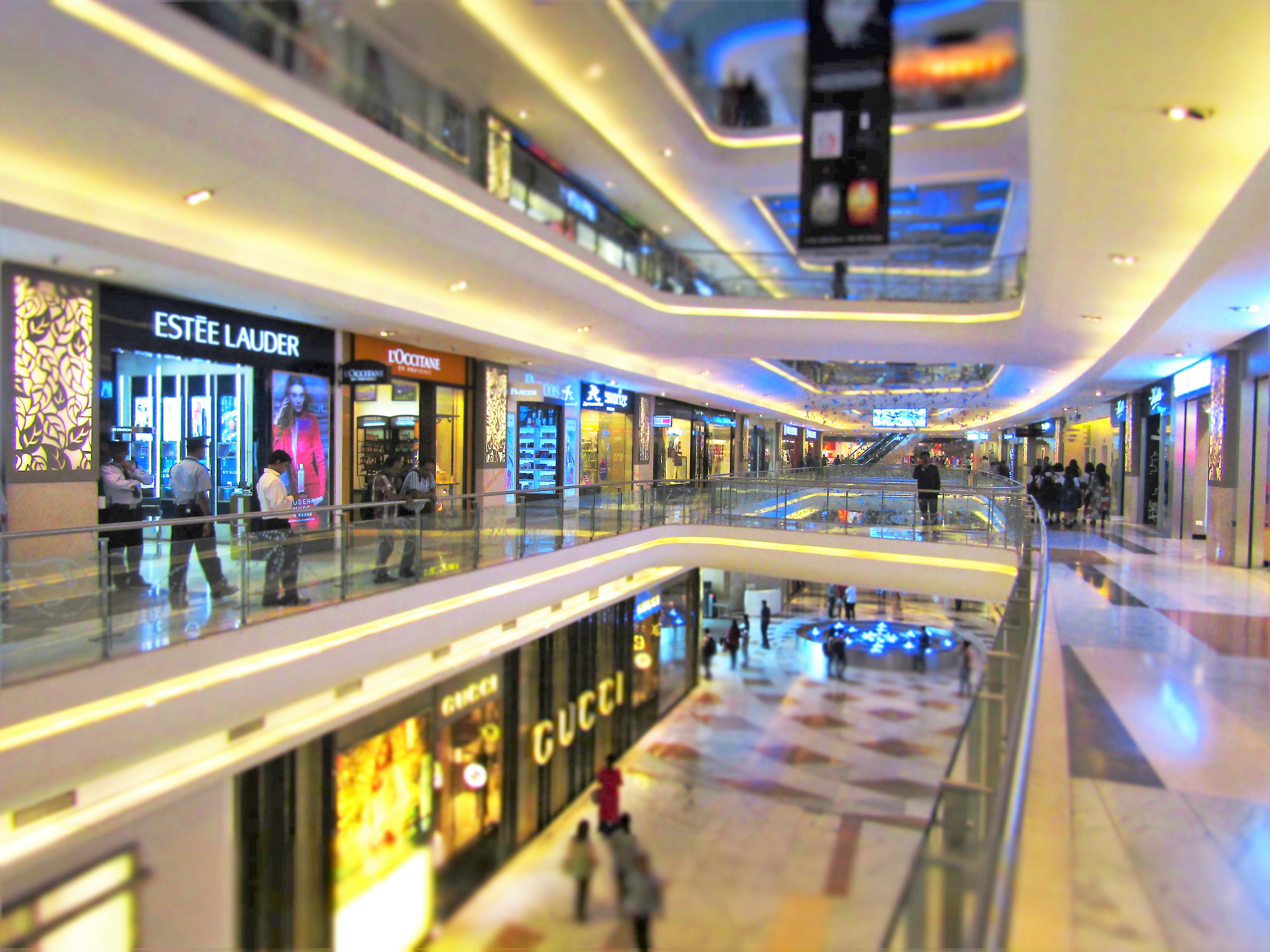
Quest Mall interior view

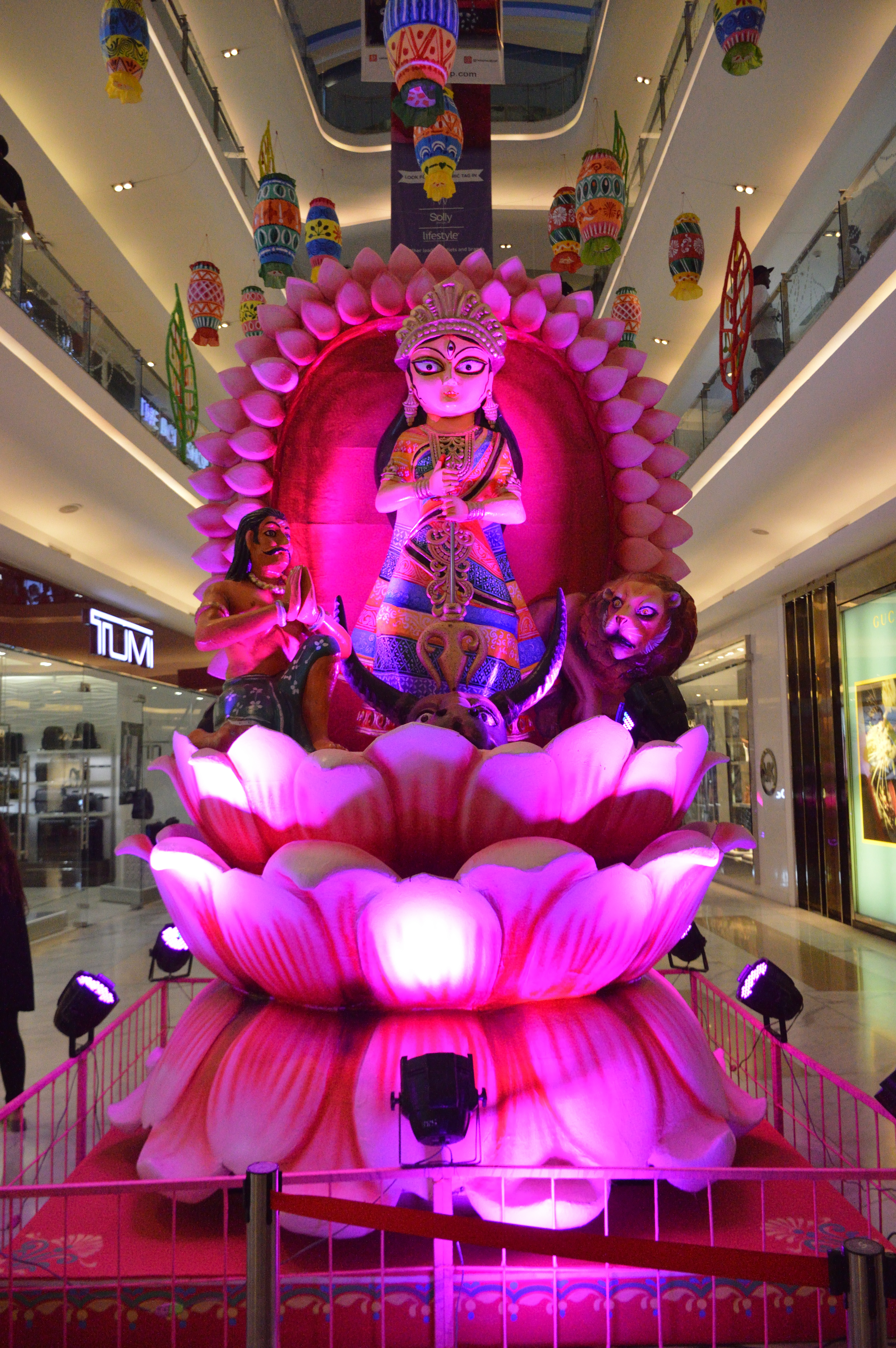
Durga Statue in Quest Mall

== See also ==
- South City Mall
- Mani Square Mall
- New Market
