= Arindam Banik =

Indian businessman

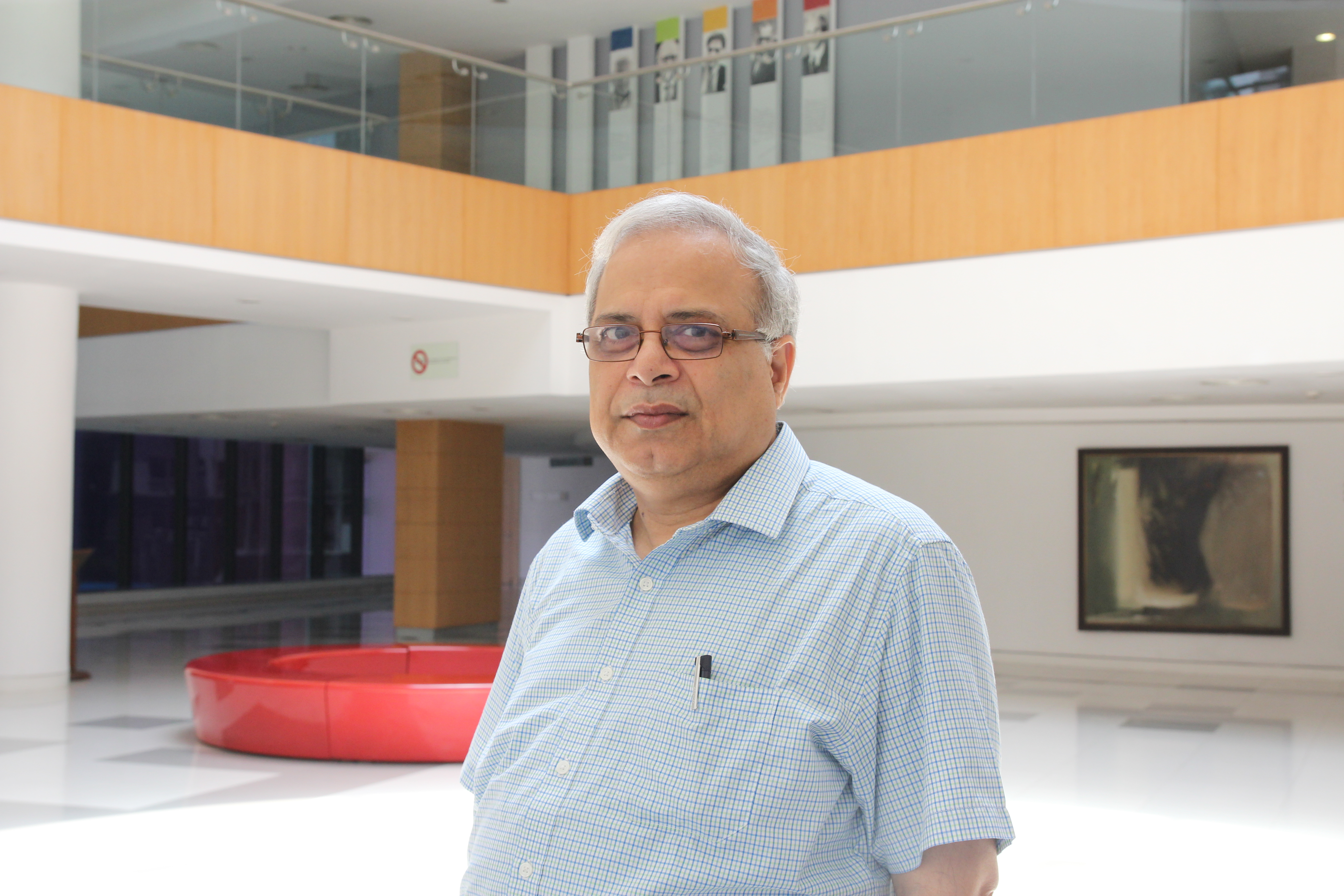
- Arindam Banik from the desk of IMI Kolkata
- Born: 26 July 1958 (age 68); Dhaka, Bangladesh

Academic background
- Education: Jahangirnagar University; University of Delhi

Academic work
- Discipline: International Trade and Business, International Finance
- Institutions: International Management Institute, New Delhi; IMI Kolkata; University of the West Indies, Barbados; Alliance Manchester Business School; Delhi School of Economics
- Website: https://www.imi.edu/delhi/faculty_details/73/arindam; Information at IDEAS / RePEc

Arindam Banik (born 1958) currently holds the position of Associated Cement Companies Chair Professor in International Business and Finance at IMI. He is the editor of the journal Global Business Review (SAGE Publications). He has a PhD in economics from Delhi School of Economics, University of Delhi. He is the former director of International Management Institute (IMI) Kolkata.

Arindam Banik has authored a number of books and published numerous articles in journals of eminence across the world. He has also presented papers at national and international conferences. His area of interest includes all domains of economics viz. development economics, business economics, managerial economics and the like. He has been an active member of many professional societies such as the Asia Pacific Economic Association (APEA), Bengal Economic Association, Indian Economic Association and Euro-Asia Management Studies Association.

== Education ==
Arindam Banik completed his BSc (1981) and MSc (1983) in economics from Jahangirnagar University, Dhaka. Commencing a career as a Junior Executiveww2 at American Express Bank, Dhaka in 1982, he gradually developed an inclination towards academics and decided to pursue higher studies. In 1993, he was awarded PhD from Delhi School of Economics, University of Delhi. In pursuit of his interest in the field of economics, he worked towards expanding his research experience.

== Service ==
=== Teaching ===
Arindam Banik has been with IMI for more than two decades. He is an Affiliated Professor at Centrum Graduate Business School, Ponficia UNIVERSIDAD CATO`LICA DEL PERU. He has also been a lecturer in economics at the University of West Indies, Cavehill Campus, Barbados.

=== Research ===
Professor Banik's research areas of interest include International Trade and Services, Global Financial Imbalance, Structure and Organisation of Financial Markets and Payment Systems, Technology Transfer and Strategic Analysis of Markets and Economics, Corporate Governance, Financial Sector Reforms and Economic Growth, International Finance and many more.

== Books ==
Selected Publications

- Trade in Health Services in South Asia : An Examination of the Need for Regional Cooperation.
- Towards A Common Future: Understanding Growth, Sustainability in the Asia-Pacific Region.
- New Technology and Land Elevations- Small Farms in Bangladesh, 1998, University Press Limited, Dhaka.
- Foreign Capital Inflows to China, India and the Caribbean - Trends Assessments and Determinants, ( with Pradip K Bhaumik), 2006, Palgrave-Macmillan's Global Academic Publishing, Macmillan publishers Limited, London.
- Corporate Governance, Responsibility and Sustainability Initiatives in Emerging Economies (Ed.), 2015, Palgrave-Macmillan's Global Academic Publishing, Macmillan Publishers Limited, London.

== Newspaper Publications ==
Some of the many articles that he has published are -

- On the farm bills: Farmers forming cooperatives will be able to negotiate better prices on their produce, The Times of India, 8 February 2021.
- Two Bengals, two economies, The Telegraph, 2 November 2020.
- What India can learn from global rankings such as THE, QS and Shanghai Rankings, The Economic Times, 9 May 2018.
- Why policymakers should not use fiscal deficit as a guide to public policy, 20 April 2018.
- Independent, not free, Indian Express, 15 April 2009.
- The Land Illusion, The Indian Express, 27 Jul 2009.
- Loan waiver and agricultural investment, (with Pradip K. Bhaumik), The Hindu Business Line, 28 March 2008.
- Changing Face of Entrepreneurship, Post Liberalization, The Hindu Business Line, 9 May 2007.
- Low Growth to Prosperity, The Daily Star, 3 January 2004.
- Indian North-east: Overcoming Isolation, 3 April 2010.
- Oxfam reports growing inequality in India, quality education is the best way to reverse this trend, Times of India, February 2, 2018.
