= IML =

IML may refer to:

== Events ==
- International Mr. Leather, a pageant and convention
- International Ms. Leather, a pageant and convention

== Computing ==
- Interactive matrix language, a part of SAS (software)
- Initial Microprogram Load, reloading Microcode into a Writable Control Store (WCS)
- Integrated Management Log, a server technology of Hewlett-Packard

== Organizations ==
- Instituti i Mjekësisë Ligjore, an Albanian institute of forensics
- IML Walking Association, promotes non competitive walking events
- International Monarchist League, a political organisation
- One of various Institutes of Modern Languages
- Investors Mutual Limited, an Australian asset management limited company

== Other uses ==
- In-mould labelling, a plastic production process
- Intermediolateral nucleus, a part of the spinal cord
- Information and media literacy, the skill that helps people form and share informed judgements while working with information and media

== See also ==
- IM 1 (disambiguation)
- IMI (disambiguation)
- lML (disambiguation)
