= International Management Institute, Bhubaneswar =

- Motto: Shaping global leaders for tomorrow
- Type: Business School
- Established: 2011
- Chairman: Mr. Sanjiv Goenka
- Director: Prof. Ramesh Behl
- Location: Bhubaneswar, India; 20.293274°N 85.746901°E
- Campus: IDCO Plot No. 1, Gothapatna, PO: Malipada, Dist.: Khurda, Bhubaneswar- 751003
- Website: http://imibh.edu.in/

International Management Institute, Bhubaneswar (IMI, Bhubaneswar) is a business school located in Bhubaneswar, the capital of eastern Indian state of Odisha.

The new 16-acre campus commenced classes for the first batch of PGDM (Post Graduate Diploma in Business Management) approved by AICTE in August 2011. The institute is known to carry out research and development and Management Development Programme (MDPs) activities in association with various companies.

Shri. Sanjiv Goenka (Chairman of RP-Sanjiv Goenka Group) is chairperson of IMI, Board of Governors and there are many other notable personalities associated with the institute. Prof. Ramesh Behl is the Director of the IMI, Bhubaneswar. It offers admission through CAT, XAT, CMAT, GMAT examinations.

The first IMI business school campus was set up in Delhi in 1981. It was in 2010 that this RP-SG Group B-school decided to start two new IMI campuses in Bhubaneswar & Kolkata.

== Courses offered ==
IMI Bhubaneswar offers the following AICTE approved, academic programmes:

- Two-year Post Graduate Diploma in Management
- Two-year Post Graduate Diploma in Management (Online)
- Fellowship Program in Management
- IMI Bhubaneswar - Grant Thornton Bharat LLP Center of Excellence
  - 11-Month Online Executive Post Graduate Certificate programme
  - IMI Bhubaneswar - Grant Thornton Bharat LLP Masterclass
  - IMI Bhubaneswar - Grant Thornton Bharat LLP Certification programme
- Management Development Programme
- Online Faculty Research Development Programme

== Accreditation and Rankings ==
IMI Bhubaneswar, established in 2011, is a young institute which achieved the coveted position of 67th rank in the National Institutional Ranking Framework (NIRF) 2023 conducted by the Ministry of HRD, Govt. of India. IMI Bhubaneswar currently offers Post Graduate Diploma in Management (PGDM), and FPM (equivalent to PhD) programmes which are approved by AICTE. The flagship PGDM programme is accredited by AMBA (Association of MBAs); NBA (National Board of Accreditation); NAAC (National Assessment and Accreditation Council); and has received equivalence from AIU (Association of Indian Universities). IMI Bhubaneswar is consistently ranked among the 'Top Private B-Schools' in India. The institution was awarded as a Management College of the Year-2015: Academic Reputation by Higher Education Review (HER) Magazine, ranked Amongst Top-4 Best Emerging B-schools by National HRD Network (NHRDN)- People Matters B-School Survey, awarded as an Outstanding B-School of Excellence by Competition Success Review (CSR) Ranking for B-Schools 2015, ranked Amongst Top-4 Best Emerging B-Schools by Business World, ranked Amongst Top-10 Emerging Business Colleges in India by Silicon India.

== Alliances ==
IMI Bhubaneswar has signed a Memorandum of Understanding with the following institutes to collaborate in research activities and Exchange Programs of Students and Faculties:

- EGADE Business School, Mexico City, Mexico.
- Sichuan Academy of Social Sciences, Chengdu, China.
- ESC Rennes International School of Business.
- Manhattan Institute of Management, New York, USA.
- Centre for Management and Research, Mauritius.

== Student life ==
The college has various student run committees and clubs under the guidance of faculties, including Placement Committee, Media and PR Committee, Branding Committee and Cultural Committee. The clubs are Prayas club (CSR Club), Fintellects (Finance Club), Cynosure (Operation Club), Insignia (HR club), Colosseum (Marketing Club), Vishleshan (Analytics) Club, Literary Club, Public Policy Club and EBSB Club.

== Infrastructure ==
The campus is spread across 16 acres and is a fully residential campus located in Gothapatna in the fringes of Bhubaneswar with large classrooms, in house as well as open gym, and various other facilities are provided to the students. The library is over 2 floors and is spread across 6000 sq ft. Beside it features over 14,000 periodicals, 13900 books and 21000 ebooks. The campus has separate canteens to cater to the needs of students and MDP participants along with staff and faculty members.
