= Open (Indian magazine) =

Indian magazine in English language featuring current affairs

- Editor: S. Prasannarajan
- Categories: Current affairs and features magazine
- Frequency: Weekly
- Publisher: Raas Taneja
- First issue: April 2009
- Company: Open Media Network Pvt Ltd
- Country: India
- Based in: New Delhi
- Language: English
- Website: www.openthemagazine.com

Open is an Indian English-language weekly magazine. It was launched on 2 April 2009 by the Open Media Network, the media venture of RP-Sanjiv Goenka Group. The current managing editor is P. R. Ramesh and the editor-in-chief is S. Prasannarajan. Previous editors were Sandipan Deb and Manu Joseph.

== History ==
The Open Magazine was conceptualised by Sandipan Deb, who joined Open Media Network after having worked for several years at Outlook and Financial Express. He left in August 2010, reportedly to pursue personal interests.

After Deb left, Manu Joseph took over as the Managing Editor. Hartosh Singh Bal was appointed as the political editor and Rahul Pandita was an associate editor.

In November 2013, Hartosh Singh Bal was sacked. According Manu Joseph, the magazine's proprietor, Sanjiv Goenka, felt that Bal's writings and appearances on television were resulting in him "making a lot of ... political enemies." Joseph himself resigned soon afterwards, and P. R. Ramesh became managing editor.

Citing several instances of "press censorship", including the controversial firing of Hartosh Singh Bal, a July 2014 editorial in the New York Times commented that:

Press censorship seems to be back with a vengeance in India, this time imposed not by direct government fiat but by powerful private owners and politicians.

As of 2014, the editor-in-chief is S. Prasannarajan. Rajmohan Radhakrishnan was its publisher until 2014 and was succeeded by Mohit Hira. After his exit in 2016, Manas Mohan was appointed in his place but left after nine months and was replaced by Ashok Bindra in 2017.

Neeraja Chawla joined as the CEO of Open Media Network in 2018.

== Controversies ==
A report in The Indian Express in April 2012 concerning government apprehension about army movements was criticised in OPEN by the then editorial chairman of Outlook, Vinod Mehta, in an interview with Hartosh Singh Bal. Mehta called the story a mistake and a "plant". In May 2012, the Express sent a legal notice to Open asking for an apology, for the contentious story to be removed from the online edition, for OPEN to pay ₹ 500 crores to the Express, and for the journalists who wrote the contentious Express story.

In 2014, after Bal, Joseph, and Rahul Pandita had left, the magazine issued a clarification and expressed regret for the Mehta column. Mehta, Bal and Joseph then complained that the new editorial team of OPEN had violated journalistic norms because they had not been contacted before the issue of the clarification and that there was no way for OPEN to make the claims it was making in its clarification.

During the premiership of Narendra Modi and his Bharatiya Janata Party, OPEN has been accused, among others, by the Indian media watchdog Newslaundry of biased and uncritical promotion of Modi and his Hindu nationalist political causes.
