= Sandipan Deb =

Indian journalist (born 1962)

- Born: 1 August 1962 (age 64); Kolkata
- Education: Indian Institute of Technology, Kharagpur; Indian Institute of Management, Calcutta
- Occupations: Writer and independent journalist.

Sandipan Deb (born 1 August 1962) is an Indian journalist and writer. He has been the managing editor of Outlook, the editor of The Financial Express and was the founder-editor of Outlook Money, Open, and Swarajya magazines. He is the author of several books.

== Early life and education ==
Sandipan Deb was born in Kolkata to Bengali parents. He completed his schooling (Class X) from Don Bosco High School, Matunga, Mumbai and junior college (Class XII) from Ramnarain Ruia College, Mumbai.

He then did his BTech. (Hons.) in Electronics and Electrical Communication Engineering from Indian Institute of Technology, Kharagpur, and Post-Graduate Diploma in Management from Indian Institute of Management, Calcutta.

== Career ==
Sandipan Deb began his career in the advertising agency Lintas India. In February 1989, he joined Classic Financial Services and Enterprises Ltd., an ITC group firm. In December 1990, he made a career shift to journalism, joining the now-defunct A&M magazine as senior correspondent and rising to executive editor. In November 1994, he joined Business Today magazine as senior editor.

In June 1995, he joined the launch team of Outlook magazine as associate editor. In 2001, he became managing editor of Outlook.

In 1998, he became the founder-editor of Intelligent Investor, India's first personal finance magazine. In 2002, the magazine was renamed Outlook Money.

In 2005, he joined the Indian Express group as editor-magazines and special projects. In June 2006, he took over as editor of The Financial Express, the group's business and economic newspaper.

He joined the RPG group, now the RPSG group in 2008 to launch the industrial conglomerate's print media business. He was editor-in-chief and briefly publisher at Open Media Network. The weekly magazine Open was launched in April 2009.

In August 2010, Sandipan Deb left Open to pursue a career in writing and independent journalism.

In 2014, he joined media start-up Kovai Media Pvt. Ltd. as editorial director. In February 2015, Kovai Media re-launched Swarajya, a magazine originally set up by C.Rajagopalachari, freedom fighter, last Governor-General of India, and founder of the Swatantra Party. Deb described Swarajya as a "big tent for liberal right-of-centre discourse".

Deb quit Swarajya in 2018 to return to an independent writing career.

He has been a columnist with the financial daily Mint and livemint.com since 2011. He has also been a columnist with The Indian Express and Mail Today.

His writings cover a broad spectrum from economy to culture, cricket to cinema, society to the future of technology. Some of his writings over the years can be accessed at livemint.com.

== Books ==
As author:

- The IITians: The Story of an Extraordinary Indian Institution and How its Alumni Are Reshaping the World, which has been translated into Chinese and Korean.
- Fallen Angel: The Making and Unmaking of Rajat Gupta.
- The Last War, a novel re-imagining the Mahabharata in the modern Mumbai underworld.

As co-author:

- Telecom Man: Leading From The Front In India’s Digital Revolution.

As editor:

- Momentous Times, a volume to commemorate 175 years of The Times of India.
- The India Infrastructure Report, reports of several high-level committees of the Government of India.

As translator:

- Thackeray Mansion (author: Sankar).
