= Denys Gurak =

- Денис Гурак

Personal details
- Born: 1 July 1986 (age 40) Kyiv, Ukraine
- Education: Ukrainian Academy of Foreign Trade

Denys Gurak (Ukrainian: Денис Гурак) is a manager of institutions and public sector enterprises. Currently, Senior Fellow at the Potomac Foundation, Partner at WeFund.Ventures, as well as Executive Director of the Association "Ukraine-France". In the past he was Deputy Director General for foreign economic activity of “Ukroboronprom”, former director of “GMP/GDP Center” of State Service of Ukraine on Medicines and Drugs Control.

== Biography ==
Denys Gurak was born on July 1, 1986, in Kyiv. Denys Gurak is the owner of pharmacy chain “Kyyivfarm Ltd.” (Pharmacy “Будьте Здорові”), where he owns a 90% share.

== Education ==
He received a bachelor's degree in law at the Ukrainian Academy of Foreign Trade and studied at the University of Amsterdam majoring in European Union law and received a degree Master of Laws (LLM).

In 2014, he graduated from the mini-MBA program at International Management Institute (MIM-Kyiv).

In 2017, he received a second degree after graduating from a magistracy of National Academy of Public Administration under the President of Ukraine, Senior Executive Institute on specialty “Management of social development”.

== Career ==
Gurak started his career as a lawyer in various law firms, including international ones, specializing in corporative, competition, financial law, and foreign trade.

In 2010 to 2014, he worked as the director of “GMP/GDP Center” of the State Service of Ukraine on Medicines and Drugs Control where he dealt with international cooperation for SMDC and adaptation of legislation on the regulation of medicines in Ukraine to EU legislation.

=== Work in “Ukroboronprom” ===
In 2014, he began his work at the State Concern “Ukroboronprom”.

Denys Gurak occupied the position of the Deputy Director General for foreign economic activity. He was a part of the team which started the reform of “Ukroboronprom”. He coordinated international business and represented Ukraine's defense industry in cooperation with NATO. In addition, Denys Gurak was the head of the official Ukrainian delegation in the NATO Industrial Advisory Group, NIAG. He coordinated integration of the defense industry of Ukraine with NATO and individual member states.

He regularly participated in international conferences and other events to represent Ukrainian defense industry.

== Rewards ==
Silver National Defense Medal from the Ministry of Defense of France
