= Hartosh Singh Bal =

Indian magazine editor

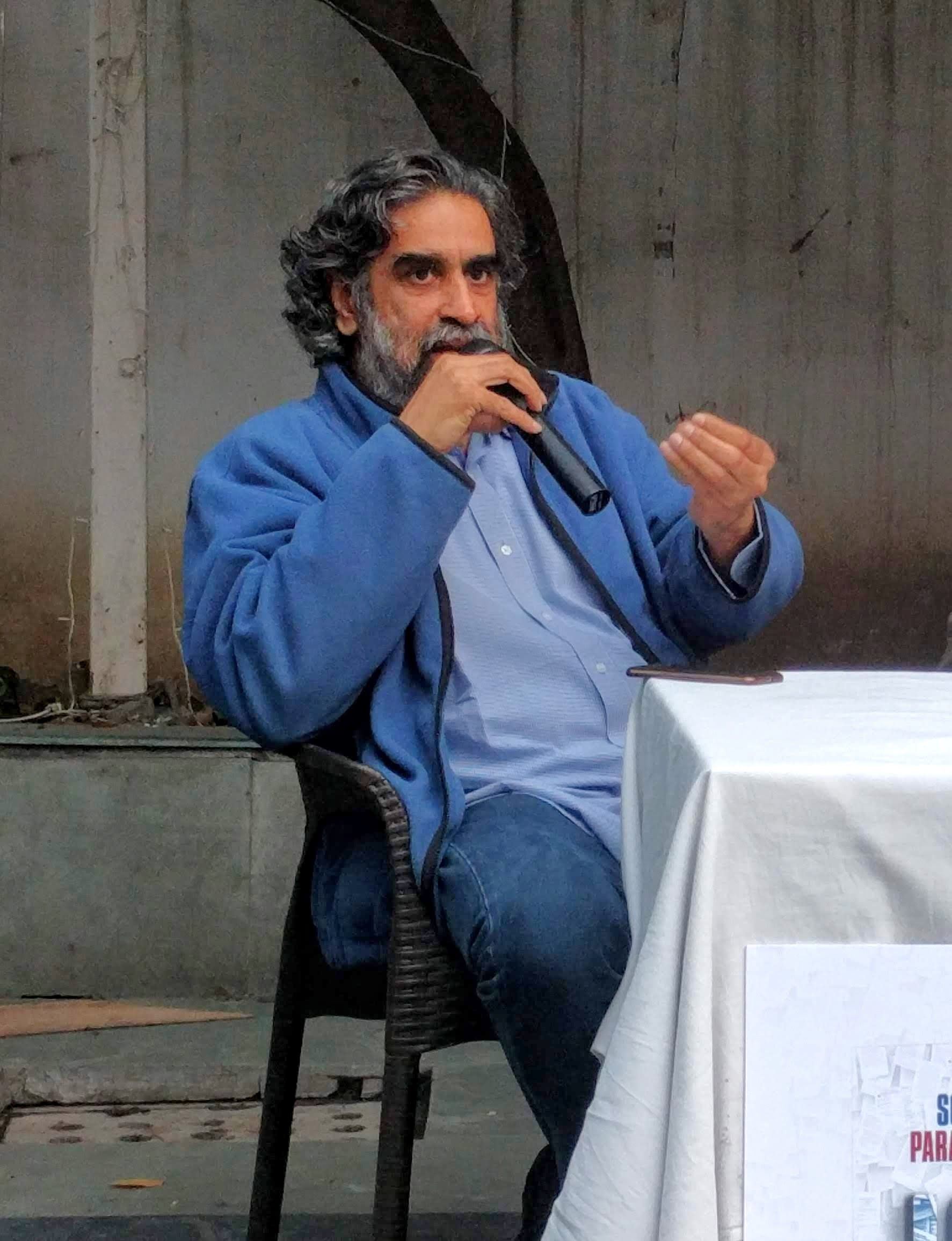
- Hartosh Singh Bal in 2018
- Born: 1966 (age 59–60)
- Education: BITS Pilani & NYU
- Occupation: Journalist

Hartosh Singh Bal (born 1966) is an Indian journalist. He is the political editor of the Indian magazines The Caravan and OPEN magazine. Bal is adjunct professor at Jindal School of Journalism & Communication at the O. P. Jindal Global University.

== Life and career ==
Bal pursued his undergraduate education in Mechanical Engineering from BITS Pilani. He then went on to pursue an MS in mathematics from New York University, USA.

In November 2013, Bal was controversially fired from his position of political editor of OPEN magazine. In an interview, OPEN's former Editor Manu Joseph revealed that the magazine's proprietor, Sanjiv Goenka, had told Joseph that Bal's views, expressed in his writings and in television appearances, were resulting in him "making a lot of... political enemies." He is also the political editor of The Caravan magazine. Bal is adjunct professor at Jindal School of Journalism & Communication at the O. P. Jindal Global University.

In 2021, Bal was invited to participate in the Harjit Kaur Sidhu Memorial Program at the University of British Columbia, where he was invited to speak on the Farmer's Movement in India. The UBC Sikh Students' Association objected to his inclusion because he is a nephew of the KPS Gill and has spoken in support of Gill's role in the suppression of the Punjab disorder. Ujjal Dosanjh, in a letter to UBC president said that he's recycled his UBC degree to protest what he perceived as an attack on academic freedom.

== Books ==
Bal has co-written a novel called A Certain Ambiguity which won the 2007 Association of American Publishers award for the best professional/scholarly book in mathematics. His second book--"Waters close over us"—is part-travelogue and partly a sociological, political, artistic, historical, and anthropological commentary.

== Awards ==
The Caravan was awarded the 2023 Shorenstein Journalism Award. Bal delivered a keynote address at Stanford in California. The award committee had specifically spoken of Bal's achievements, "The award also recognizes the contributions of The Caravan's executive editor, Hartosh Singh Bal, who formerly worked as the magazine's political editor for ten years. An incisive commentator on Indian politics and society, Bal was the political editor of Open magazine and has worked with The Indian Express, Tehelka and Mail Today. He is the author of Waters Close Over Us, A Journey Along the Narmada and co-author of A Certain Ambiguity, A Mathematical Novel. He is trained as an engineer and a mathematician."
