= IMI =

IMI, Imi, may refer to:

== Companies and organizations ==
- IMI plc, a British engineering company
- IMI Systems, an Israeli weapons manufacturer
- Independent Media Institute, founder of AlterNet
- Indian Music Industry, a trust that represents the recording industry distributors in India
- Indonesian Motor Association
- Institute of Mathematics and Informatics (Bulgarian Academy of Sciences)
- Institute of the Motor Industry, UK
- Integrated Micro-Electronics, Inc., a semiconductor maker in the Philippines
- International Hotel Management Institute Switzerland
- International Maritime Institute, India
- International Media Investments, United Arab Emirates
- International Migration Institute, at the University of Oxford
- International Mycological Institute, England
- Irish Management Institute
- Israel Music Institute
- Institute for Management and Innovation, at the University of Toronto

== Other ==
- IMI Desert Eagle, a semi-automatic handgun
- Inclusive Mosque Initiative, UK
- Innovative Medicines Initiative, a partnership of the European Union
- Internal Market Information System, network that links public bodies in the European Economic Area
- International Migration Initiative, of the Open Society Foundation
- Italian military internees, name given by Germany to captured Italian soldiers
- "iMi", a song from the album I, I by American folk band Bon Iver
- Imi, Ethiopia
- Imi, a Babylonian king
- IMI (Morse code ..--..), abbreviation for "I say again" in morse code

== See also ==
- International Management Institute (disambiguation)
- IM 1 (disambiguation)
- IML (disambiguation)
- lMI (disambiguation)
