= Firstsource =

Provider of business process outsourcing services

Firstsource Solutions Limited
- Type: Public
- Traded as: BSE: 532809; NSE: FSL
- Industry: Business process management
- Founded: 2001; 25 years ago
- Headquarters: Mumbai, Maharashtra, India
- Key people: Sanjiv Goenka (Executive Chairman); Ritesh Idnani (CEO & MD); Dinesh Jain (CFO); Sohit Brahmawar (COO)
- Services: Business process outsourcing, knowledge process outsourcing
- Revenue: ₹79,803 million (equivalent to ₹82 billion or US$860 million in 2026)
- Net income: ₹5,945 million (equivalent to ₹6.1 billion or US$64 million in 2026)
- Parent: RP-Sanjiv Goenka Group
- Website: firstsource.com

Firstsource Solutions Limited is an Indian business process management company headquartered in Mumbai. It is owned by RP-Sanjiv Goenka Group, and listed on the BSE and NSE since 2007.

== History ==
Firstsource started its operations in 2001 as ICICI InfoTech Upstream Ltd, a business process outsourcing organisation wholly owned by ICICI Bank, India’s largest private financial services organisation. Company’s name was later changed to ICICI OneSource Limited before it adopted its current name as Firstsource Solutions Limited in 2006. The same year, Firstsource opened a branch office in the Philippines. Firstsource made an initial public offer in 2007 and was listed on the National Stock Exchange (NSE) and Bombay Stock Exchange (BSE) in India on 22 February 2007.

=== Acquisitions ===
In 2002, the company acquired CustomerAsset and Tawny Dove Ltd. One year later, it acquired FirstRing India Pvt Ltd, a contact centre company. In 2005, it acquired healthcare services provider RevIT. In December 2006, it acquired Business Process Management Inc (BPM). Firstsource acquired ISGN in 2016, which was rebranded as Sourcepoint in 2019.

In November 2021, Firstsource announced to acquire the US mortgage services provider The StoneHill Group. In May 2024, Firstsource acquired Chennai-based medical billing firm Quintessence Business Solutions & Services (QBSS) for ₹327.8 crore (approximately US$39 million). The acquisition included its US arm, Quintessence Health LLC, which became a step-down subsidiary.

In September 2024, Firstsource acquired UK-based customer experience provider Ascensos for £42 million (approximately US$56 million). Ascensos continues to operate independently as a business unit headquartered in Scotland.

== Corporate affairs ==
=== Operations ===
As of March 2025, Firstsource operates global delivery centers across 10 countries including India, the United States, the United Kingdom, the Philippines, South Africa, Australia, Mexico, Romania, Trinidad and Tobago, and Turkey. The company primarily serves clients in North America and Europe, with North America accounting for approximately 68% of revenues and EMEA for 31%.

=== Ownership ===
As of 31 March 2025, the promoter RPSG Ventures Limited owned a 53.66% stake in Firstsource. The rest is owned by public shareholders including mutual funds, domestic and foreign institutions, and retail investors.

== See also ==
- 3i Infotech
- WNS Global Services
- Fortune India 500
