= IM1 =

IM 1, IM-1, or IM1 may refer to:

- Intuitive Machines IM-1 (Odysseus), a February 2024 lunar lander space mission under NASA CLPS program
- Interstellar meteor IM1 (CNEOS 2014-01-08), a 2014 meteor announced to be of interstellar origin in 2019 and confirmed in 2022
- Institute of Medicine 1 (IM-1), Rangoon, Burma; former name of University of Medicine 1, Yangon, Myanmar
- Douglas, Isle of Man (post code IM1)
- Intermediate 1 (IM1), a competition class under British Rowing

== See also ==
- IM (disambiguation)
- IMI (disambiguation)
- IML (disambiguation)
