= Shashwat Goenka =

Indian business executive

- Born: Kolkata, West Bengal, India
- Occupation: Business executive
- Years active: 2013–present
- Known for: Director of RPSG Group

Shashwat Goenka is an Indian business executive and the youngest scion of the Kolkata-based RPSG Group. He serves as the director of the group and is responsible for leading the conglomerate's foray into new business ventures. Shashwat Goenka was born in Kolkata, West Bengal, India, to Sanjiv Goenka and Preeti Goenka.

== Career ==
Under his leadership, the RPSG Group has expanded its portfolio in various sectors, including power and energy, retail, FMCG, entertainment, and sports. Shashwat Goenka played a key role in the acquisition of the retail chain Spencer's from the UK-based retailer, Woolworths, in 2011. He also led the Group's entry into the Indian Super League (ISL) by acquiring a franchise, ATK, in 2014, which has won the league title thrice under his leadership.

Apart from his business ventures, Shashwat Goenka is actively involved in philanthropy and supports various charitable causes through the RPSG Foundation.

== Recognition and awards ==
Shashwat Goenka has been recognized for his contributions to the business world and has been awarded several honours, including the 'Asia's 21 Young Leaders Award' by the Asia Society in 2017 and the '40 Under 40' award by Fortune India in 2019.
