= Spencer's Retail =

Indian chain of retail stores

Spencer's Retail Limited
- Type: Public
- Traded as: NSE: SPENCERS; BSE: 542337
- Industry: Retail
- Founded: 1863 as Durrant & Spencer
- Founders: Charles Durrant & John William Spencer
- Headquarters: Kolkata, West Bengal, India
- Number of locations: 120 Across 35 Cities
- Products: Supermarket; Hypermarket; Superstore; Convenience shop
- Number of employees: 5000+
- Parent: RP-Sanjiv Goenka Group
- Website: www.spencersretail.com

Spencer's Retail is an Indian chain of retail stores headquartered in Kolkata, West Bengal. It has presence in over 35 cities. Spencer's is based on the 'Food First' Format (it mainly offers fresh and packaged food). Many outlets offer multiple formats for retailing food, apparel, fashion, electronics, lifestyle products, music and books. It is owned by RP-Sanjiv Goenka Group.

== History ==
Spencer's began operations as a retail chain in the early 1990s in Southern India.

Between 2006 and 2009, Spencer's brand expanded rapidly and at one point of time, had 300+ stores.

In 2008, Spencer's opened its largest store in India in the eastern Indian metropolis of Kolkata. The store spreads over 72,000 square feet (6,700 m^{2}) and is located in the South City Mall.

During 2009 to 2016 it underwent consolidation by shutting down non-performing stores and the Company achieved break-even EBITDA by 2016. The strategy is profitable growth in chosen geographies.

In 2015, Spencer's acquired the online grocery store Meragrocer for an undisclosed amount. Spencer's has been strengthening omnichannel efforts since then.

The company launched a diversified private label program and has been focusing on increasing share of high margin categories.

The company achieved positive after tax profit for the year 2018-19

As of June 30, 2019, the total number of stores was 160 on a standalone basis. On July 4, 2019, Spencer Successfully Completed the acquisition of Nature's basket limited from Godrej Industries Ltd. The company claimed that the acquisition would help them give access in India's western markets with around 31 physical stores in major cities.

== Formats ==
Stores are largely set up in one of 2 formats.

- Convenience stores, called Spencer’s
- Hypermarkets, called Spencer’s Hyper

== Key people ==
- Shashwat Goenka - Chairman
- Anuj Singh MD & CEO
- Neelesh Bothra - CFO
- Rahul Nayak - Executive Director - Supply Chain
- Aniruddha Bannerjee - CSO
- Sutanu Choudhury - CHRO

== Private brands ==
Spencer's offers a wide range of private brand products that in both food and non-food categories. 'Spencer's Smart Choice' is the leading instore brand which labels products ranging from juices, noodles, cookies, honey, air fresheners etc. Spencer's has the 'Clean Home' range of home improvement products and 'Tasty Wonders' range of snacks and impulse foods. Spencer's offers general merchandise products under the brand name of Maroon, which includes Non-stick and hard anodized pans, plastic goods and foils.

=== Expansion ===
Retail chain Foodworld was bought over by the Future Group. All stores were re-branded under the Spencer's banner once formalities were completed.

== See also ==
- Reliance Retail
- Spar (retailer)
- Smart Bazaar
