= 3i Infotech =

Indian technology company

3i Infotech Limited
- Trade name: 3i Infotech Limited
- Type: Public
- Traded as: BSE: 532628; NSE: 3IINFOTECH
- Industry: Technology; IT services Outsourcing
- Founded: 11 October 1993
- Headquarters: Navi Mumbai, India
- Area served: Worldwide
- Key people: Raj Ahuja, Group CEO
- Services: IT/ ITES
- Revenue: ₹814 crore (US$85 million) (2024)
- Number of employees: 3500+
- Website: 3i-infotech.com

3i Infotech Ltd is an Indian technology company, headquartered in Navi Mumbai, India. Established in 1993, the company provides IT services such as digital transformation, cloud services, cybersecurity, and application development across sectors including banking, healthcare, government, telecommunications, and education.

== History ==
Established in 1993 as ICICI Infotech Ltd., 3i Infotech was a wholly owned subsidiary of ICICI/ICICI Bank until ICICI divested the majority of the shares in March 2002, at which point the company ceased to be a subsidiary of ICICI. Demerging from ICICI, the company embraced a wider range of industries, encompassing telecom, retail, manufacturing, and more.

== See also ==
- Software industry in Telangana
- List of public listed software companies of India
- Firstsource
- Hinjawadi
