= A Certain Ambiguity =

2007 novel Gaurav Suri and Hartosh Singh Bal

A Certain Ambiguity: A Mathematical Novel
- Author: Gaurav Suri; Hartosh Singh Bal
- Language: English
- Publisher: Princeton University Press
- Publication date: July 2, 2007
- Media type: Hardcover
- Pages: 292
- ISBN: 978-0-691-12709-5

A Certain Ambiguity: A Mathematical Novel is a mathematical fiction by Indian authors Gaurav Suri and Hartosh Singh Bal. It is a story about finding certainty in mathematics and philosophy. In a certain ambiguity we meet Ravi Kapoor, who travels to America to further his education, and is fascinated both by mathematics and philosophy. There he finds about his grandfather being jailed in the year 1919. The book talks about Ravi's experience in the college and his quest to uncover the reason for his grandfather's arrest.

The book is the winner of the 2007 Award for Best Professional/Scholarly Book in Mathematics, Association of American Publishers.
