= IMI Kolkata =

Business school in Kolkata, India

International Management Institute Kolkata
- Motto: Shaping global leaders for tomorrow
- Type: Private business school
- Established: 2011; 15 years ago
- Accreditation: NBA; EFMD
- Academic affiliations: AICTE
- Budget: ₹19.18 crore (US$2.0 million) (FY2021–22 est.)
- Chairman: Sanjiv Goenka
- Director: Mohua Banerjee
- Academic staff: 29 (2023)
- Students: 326 (2023)
- Postgraduates: 319 (2023)
- Doctoral students: 7 (2023)
- Location: Kolkata, West Bengal, India; 22°31′34″N 88°19′35″E
- Campus: 3 acres (1.2 ha); Urban
- Website: www.imik.edu.in

International Management Institute (IMI) Kolkata is a private business school located in Kolkata, India. It was founded in 2010. The Institute started its operation in 2011 with its flagship Post Graduate Diploma in Management Programme accredited by the National Board of Accreditation (NBA). The first group of students at IMI Kolkata graduated in the year 2013. Campus placements at IMI Kolkata increased in the year 2014. In 2017, the Institute obtained the approval from All India Council for Technical Education to launch the Fellow Programme in Management (FPM), a Ph.D. level programme. IMI Kolkata's two-year full time PGDM programme is also accorded equivalence with Master of Business Administration (MBA) Degree by the Association of Indian Universities (AIU).

== History ==
IMI Kolkata belongs to the IMI family of B-Schools in India, starting in New Delhi in 1981. IMI New Delhi was established in collaboration with IMI Geneva (now IMD Lausanne) and is the first corporate sponsored B-school in India. During its inception, the institute was backed by the support of large companies including RPG Enterprises, Nestle, ITC, SAIL, Tata Chemicals, BOC and Williamson Magor. In 2010 the RP-Sanjiv Goenka group opened two more campuses in Kolkata and Bhubaneswar.

== Academics ==
=== Ranking ===
University rankings

Business/Management – India
- NIRF (2024): 56

In 2023, IMI Kolkata was ranked 70th among management institutes in India by the National Institutional Ranking Framework (NIRF). IMI Kolkata is also a part of Study in India programme, under Ministry of Human Resource Development, Government of India.

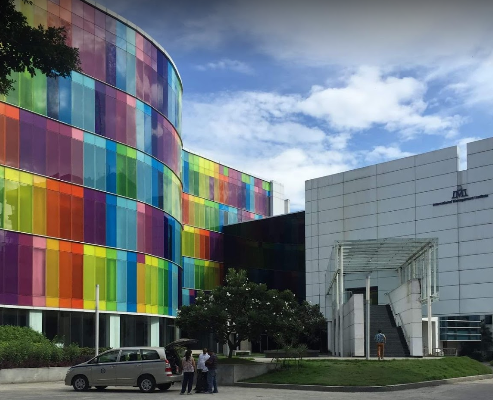
Entrance to the IMI Kolkata Academic block

=== International collaborations and partnerships ===
In 2011, in order to facilitate joint research in retail and other areas, IMI entered into an agreement with the Oxford Institute of Retail Management (OXIRM). The basic objective of the research programme was to influence public policy decision makers on retail development issues and retail practitioners through data-driven retail and consumer-related research outputs among others.

The Institute signed a Memorandum of Understanding (MoU) with various eminent institutes/universities on the global front. The collaborating partners include:

- ESC Rennes School of Business(France)
- Sichuan University(China)
- Sichuan Academy of Social Sciences(China)
- Kunming University of Science and Technology (KUST), China
- IAE University of Tours (France)
- North South University (Bangladesh)
- Universidade do Estado Rio de Janeiro/Rio de Janeiro State University (Brazil)
- IDRAC Business School (France)
- Emporia State University(USA)
- College of Business and Economics, University of Guelph, Ontario, Canada
- Xunta De Galicia

=== Academic programmes ===
IMI Kolkata offers a two-year full-time Post Graduate Diploma in Management (PGDM). The criteria for selection to the academic program is based on the Common Admission Test (CAT), the Xavier Aptitude Test (XAT) score of the candidates applying to the course.

=== In-house publication ===
IMI Konnect is a bi-monthly open access scholarly management publication of IMI Kolkata.

=== Academic Journals ===
- Journal of Operations and Strategic Planning through Sage Publications. JOSP is a bi annual international journal designed to inform and shape academic discussions around empirical and theoretical facets of Operations Management.
- Studies in Microeconomics through Sage Publications. Studies in Microeconomics (MIC) is a Scopus, RePEc, ProQuest, ICI, EconLit listed international (Sage) journal, publishing high quality, analytically rigorous papers in the areas of Microeconomics .

== Organisation and administration ==
=== Centres of Excellence ===
IMI-Kolkata has four Centres of Excellence in the areas of Financial Markets, Retail, Corporate Governance and Social Responsibility, Asian Studies and Consumer Studies.

- Centre for Retail Management (CRM): focusing on addressing emerging needs in the retail sector, including capacity building, policy decisions on developmental issues, research in critical retailing practices, global research on the emerging markets and research in consumer behavior.
- Centre for Financial Market Studies (CFMS): focusing on training, research and consultancy in areas related to banking and financial sector. IMI Kolkata published working paper on "How Well Are the Banks Managing Their NPAs? A Comparative Analysis" by Paramita Mukherjee.
- Centre for Corporate Governance and Social Responsibility (CCGSR): established to serve the increasing requirement for training, research and consultancy in corporate governance. The CCGSR focuses on the application of corporate governance policies and mechanisms for practising managers, understanding reporting mechanisms in the context of corporate governance and benchmarking of global good practices in corporate governance. National Foundation for Corporate Governance with IMI Kolkata is working on Project on ‘Exploring linkages between Gender Diversity and Corporate Governance: Do Women Directorships really add to Business Value?’ IMI Kolkata is accredited as National Centre for Corporate Governance. by National Foundation of Corporate Governance (NFCG).
- Centre for Asian Studies (CAS): working on developing knowledge through original research, disseminating knowledge through use of Asian materials and pedagogy, carrying out research on the infrastructure sector, including its regulations and developing and leverage international collaborations through studies having high policy impact. IMI Kolkata in Collaboration with Asia Pacific Economic Association. have organised annual conferences. IMI Kolkata has organised the Fifteenth Annual Conference (2019) at Fukuoka University, Fukuoka, Japan, the Fourteenth Annual Conference(2018) in University of Southern California, Los Angeles, United States, the Thirteenth Annual Conference(2017) in Korea University, Seoul, Korea, the Twelfth Annual Conference(2016) in IMI Kolkata campus and the Eleventh Annual Conference of the Association(2015) in National Taiwan University. IMI Kolkata in association with Sichuan Academy of Social Sciences, has also organised joint Indo-China conferences, on topics relevant to both the economies. The conferences are held every year in either of the two campuses. IMI Kolkata partnered with Global Development Network, which began as a unit of the World Bank in agreement with BIDS, to organise a conference on 'Science Technology and Innovation for Development' in 2018.

=== Directors of IMI Kolkata ===
- 2011-2012- Professor Ashish K Bhattacharya, Former professor of Indian Institute of Management Calcutta
- 2012-2013- Professor Ahindra Chakrabarti, Professor, Greatlakes Institute of Management, Gurgaon
- 2013-2014- Interim Director, Professor Tirthankar Nag, Dean, Research and International Relations, IMI Kolkata
- 2014-2020- Professor Arindam Banik, Associated Cement Companies Chair Professor in International Business and Finance at IMI
- October 2020 onwards- Professor Mohua Banerjee, IMI Kolkata
