= Institute of Modern Languages =

Institute of Modern Languages may refer to

- Institute of Modern Languages (Dhaka), Bangladesh
- Institute of Modern Languages (Faisalabad), Pakistan
- Institute of Modern Languages (Queensland), University of Queensland, Australia
- Institute of Modern Languages, University of Chittagong, Bangladesh
- Bourguiba Institute of Modern Languages, Tunis El Manar University, Tunisia
