= LMI =

LMI may refer to:

- LaMia (ICAO airline code: LMI), former Bolivian charter airline
- Lenders mortgage insurance
- Leo Minor (IAU: LMi), a constellation in the northern celestial hemisphere
- Liberty Media International, a media company in the United States of America
- Linear matrix inequality
- Linux Mark Institute
- Lisp Machines, Inc.
- Lista Monumentelor Istorice, the National Register of Historic Monuments in Romania
- Liverpool Medical Institution
- Local Management Interface, a frame-relay term
- Log management and intelligence, in computer systems management
- Logic Masters India, the Indian representative of the World Puzzle Federation
- Logistics Management Institute, an American consultancy dedicated to improving the business of government
- Low and Moderate Income; see Transit-oriented development
