= Mani Square =

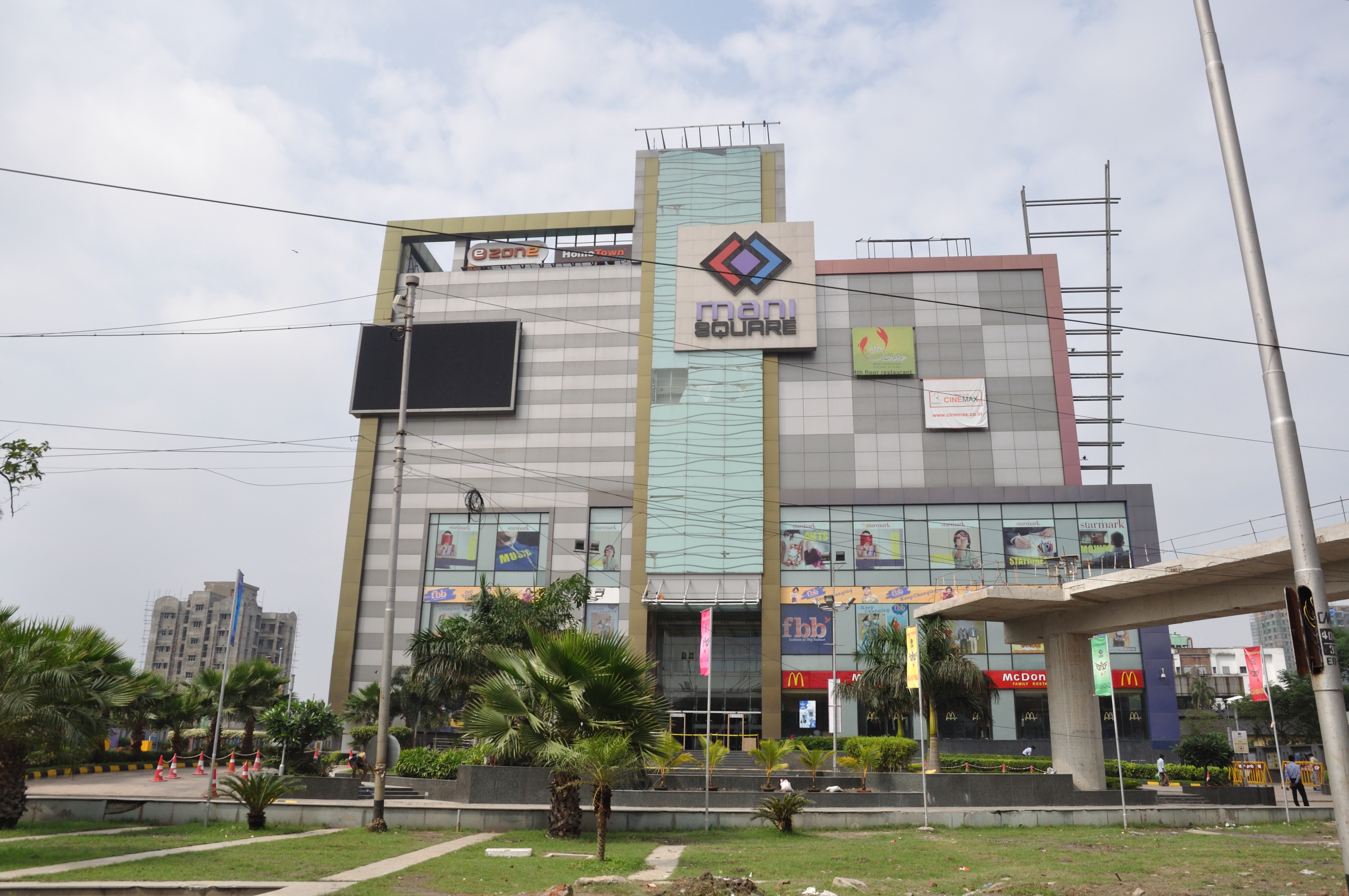
- The Mani Square
- Location: Kankurgachi, Kolkata, India
- Owner: Mani Group
- Num. of stores: More than 250
- Floors: 4
- Parking: Available

Mani Square is a shopping mall in Kolkata, India, with over 250 shops and more than 2,000 customers per day. It has more than 7,000,000 square feet (650,000 m^{2}) of total area. It is operational since 15 June 2008. It is located in 164/1, Manicktala Main Road (E.M. Bypass), Kolkata, West Bengal 700054. It is owned by the Mani group. The shops at Mani Square Mall include Spencers, Westside, E Zone, Collection-I, Amoeba and Scary House along with major brands like the United Colours of Benetton, Zodiac, Stanza, Eye-Plus, Reebok, Adidas, Lee Cooper, Dockers, Levi's, USI, Blues & Blues, Tissot, Otobi, Little Shop, AND, Eye Catchers, Raymonds, Strauss, ColourPlus and more. The restaurants at Mani Square Mall, apart from McDonald's, include CCD, Hoppipola, Chapter 2, Kaidi Kitchen, Haka, Flame 'N' Grill, Machaan, KFC, Subway to name a few. It has a shopping area of more than 196,095 square feet (18,217.8 m^{2}). It has 11 escalators. It has an average footfall of 30,000 to 35,000 per weekday. It has a parking area of 102,275 square feet (9,501.7 m^{2}), and can easily have more than 1200 cars. There is a basement floor where Spencer's shop is located. The first to open the gates in the property was McDonald's. It has a fun and entertainment floor, too, which has a little more than 37,431 square feet (3,477.5 m^{2}) of area. Mani Square has a multiplex run by PVR Cinemas (earlier Cinemax). Recently, Mani Group announced that they would develop 6,000,000 sq. feet of residential and commercial space. It is a project with an estimated budget of 150 crore (1.5 billion) rupees.

== Gallery ==
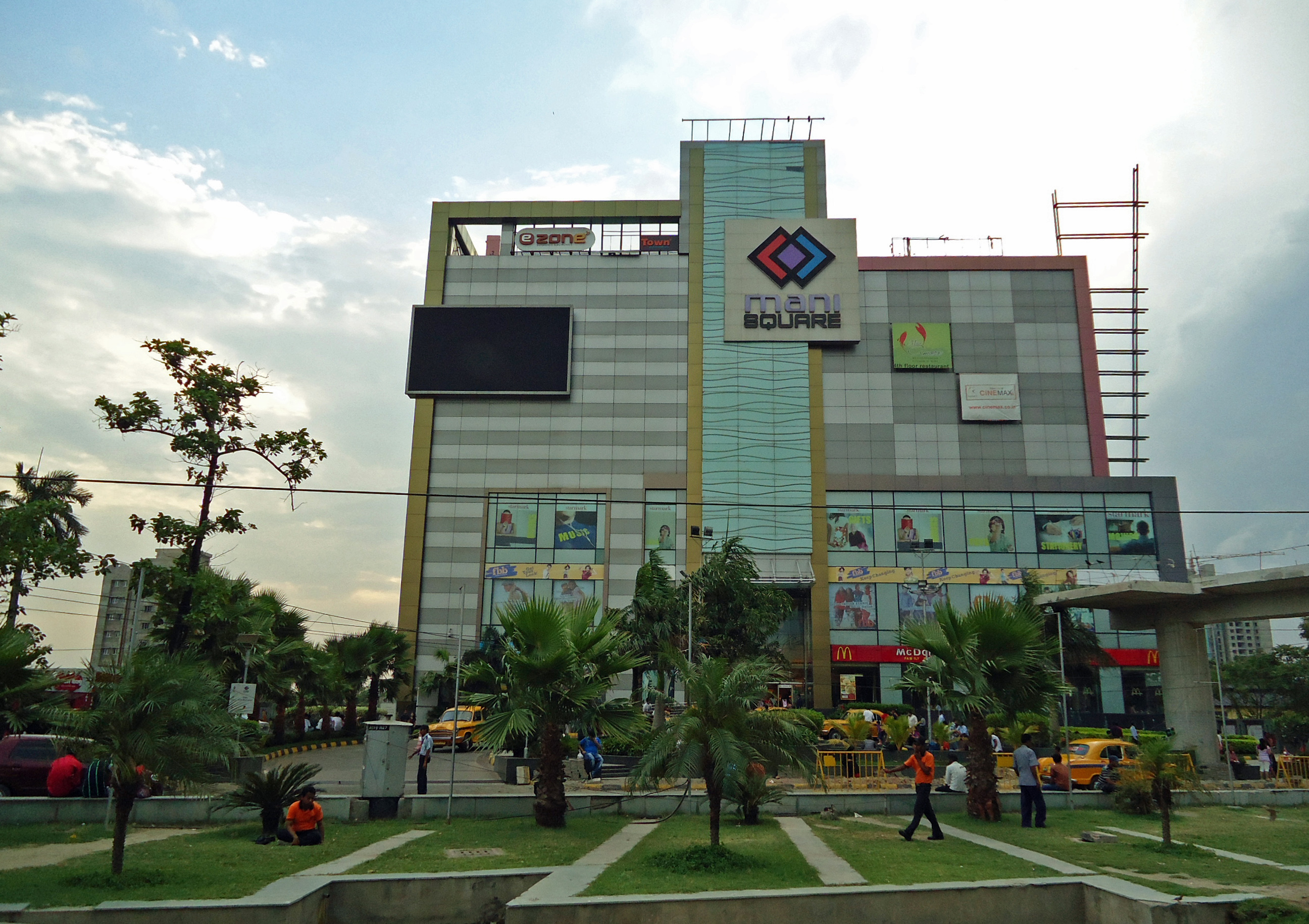
Mani Square dusk view

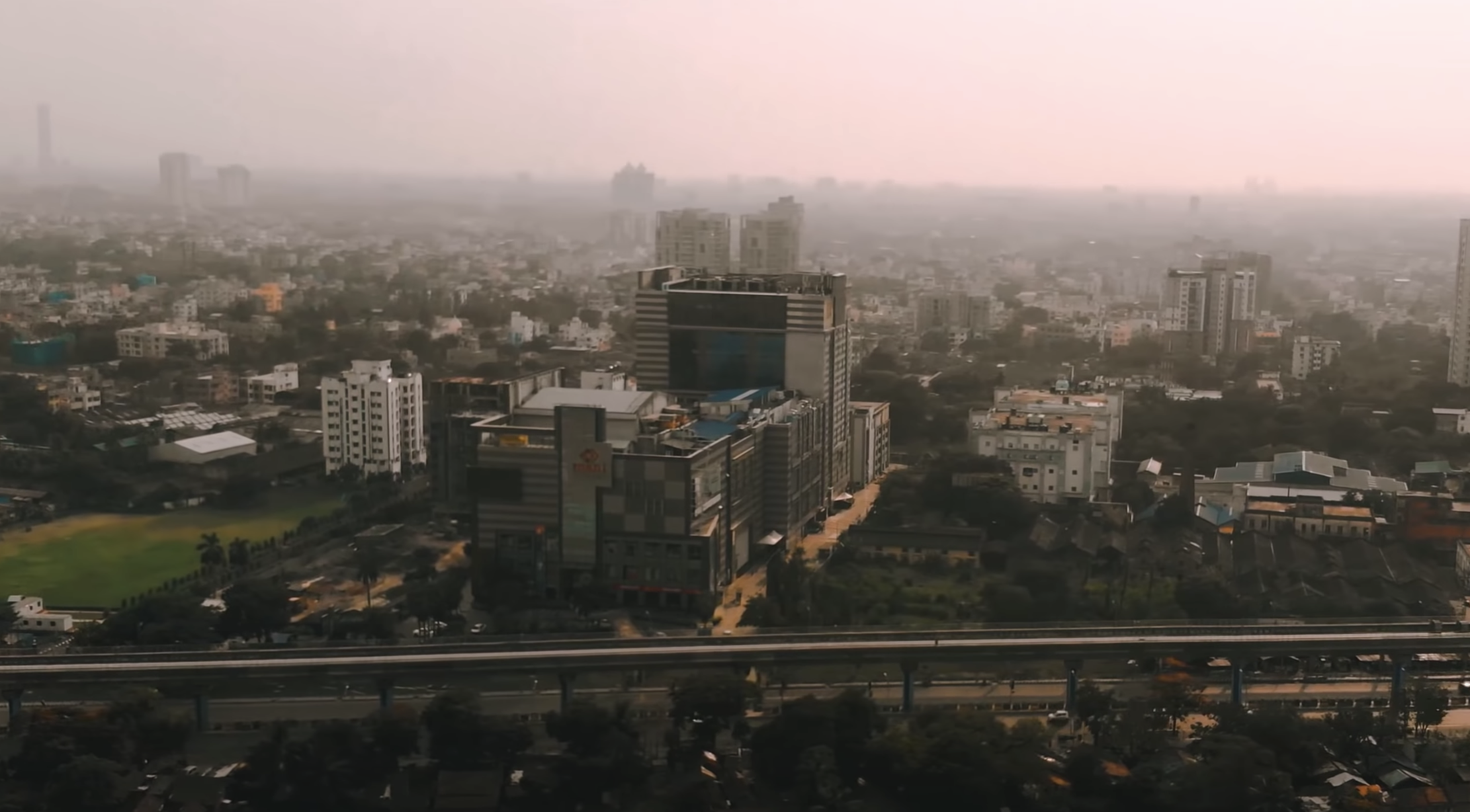
Mani Square aerial view

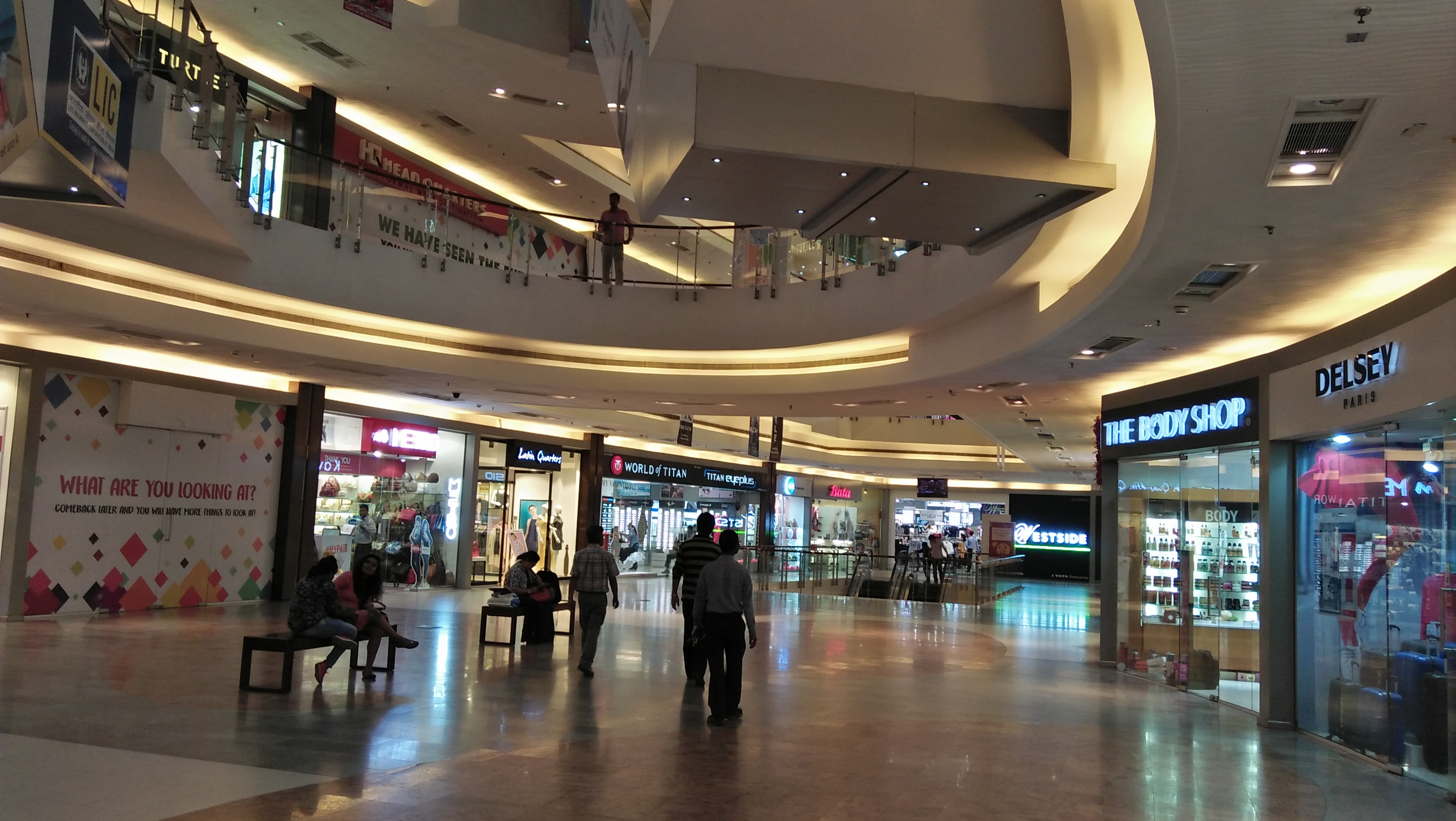
Mani Square inside view

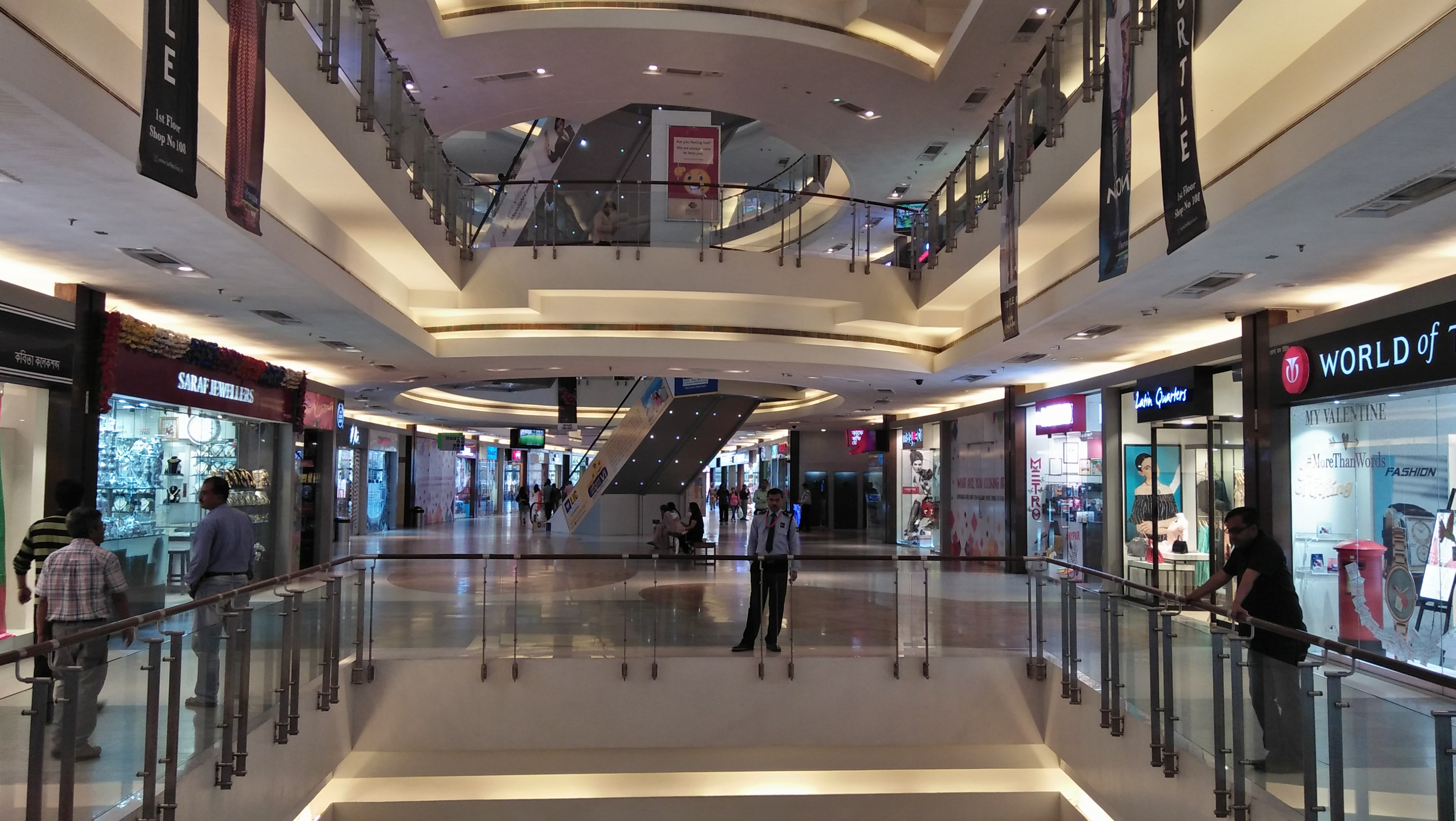
Mani Square interior view
