= Global Business Review =

- Discipline: Business and Management
- Language: English
- Edited by: Kakali Kanjilal

Publication details
- History: 2000–present
- Publisher: SAGE Publications
- Frequency: Bimonthly
- Impact factor: 2.3

Standard abbreviations
- ISO 4: Glob. Bus. Rev.

Indexing
- ISSN: 0972-1509 (print); 0973-0664 (web)

Links
- Journal homepage; Online access; Online archive

The Global Business Review is a peer-reviewed academic journal covering all aspects of management. Global Business Review is published once in two months (Bi-monthly) by International Management Institute in association with SAGE Publications. It is edited by Professor Kakali Kanjilal.

The entire contents of Global Business Review are available in full-text, searchable electronic databases.

== Abstracting and indexing ==
Global Business Review is abstracted and indexed in:

- Australian Business Deans Council (ABDC)
- CABELLS Journalytics
- Chartered Association of Business Schools (ABS)
- DeepDyve
- Dutch-KB
- EBSCO
- Indian Citation Index (ICI)
- J-Gate
- OCLC
- Ohio
- Portico
- Pro-Quest-RSP
- ProQuest-Illustrata
- ProQuest: International Bibliography of the Social Sciences (IBSS)
- ProQuest: World Political Science Abstracts
- Research Papers in Economics (RePEc)
- SCOPUS
- UGC-CARE (GROUP II)
- Emerging Sources Citation Index (ESCI)

According to the Journal Citation Reports from Clarivate, 2023, the journal has a 2022 Impact Factor (JCR) of 2.4 and a 2022 Cite Score (Scopus) of 4.3
