= LML =

LML may refer to:

- Lazy ML, a programming language
- Lightweight markup language in computing
- Lifecycle Modeling Language, in systems engineering
- Lohia Machinery Limited, scooter company
