= Higher Education Review =

- Discipline: Education
- Language: English

Publication details
- History: 1968-2018
- Publisher: Tyrrell Burgess Associates
- Frequency: Triannually

Standard abbreviations
- ISO 4: High. Educ. Rev.

Indexing
- ISSN: 0018-1609
- OCLC no.: 615538568

Higher Education Review was a triannual peer-reviewed academic journal established in 1968 that covers research on post-secondary education. It ceased operation in 2018. An archive of published articles from 2011 until the end is available from its archived website.

== Mission ==
Its mission was an "academic journal concerned with policy and practice, with contributions soundly based in research or scholarship, but with implications for reform or change".

== History ==
Higher Education Review was established in 1968 by Cornmarket Press with Tyrrell Burgess as founding editor. In 1970, Burgess became publisher and led its publication until his death in 2009. The journal was published by Tyrrell Burgess Associates until wrapping up in 2018.

Higher Education Review is indexed by the Education Resources Information Center (ERIC). It was ranked 11th of 67 higher education journals for both quality and esteem in a study by the University of Newcastle, Australia.
