= RP-Sanjiv Goenka Group =

Indian multinational conglomerate

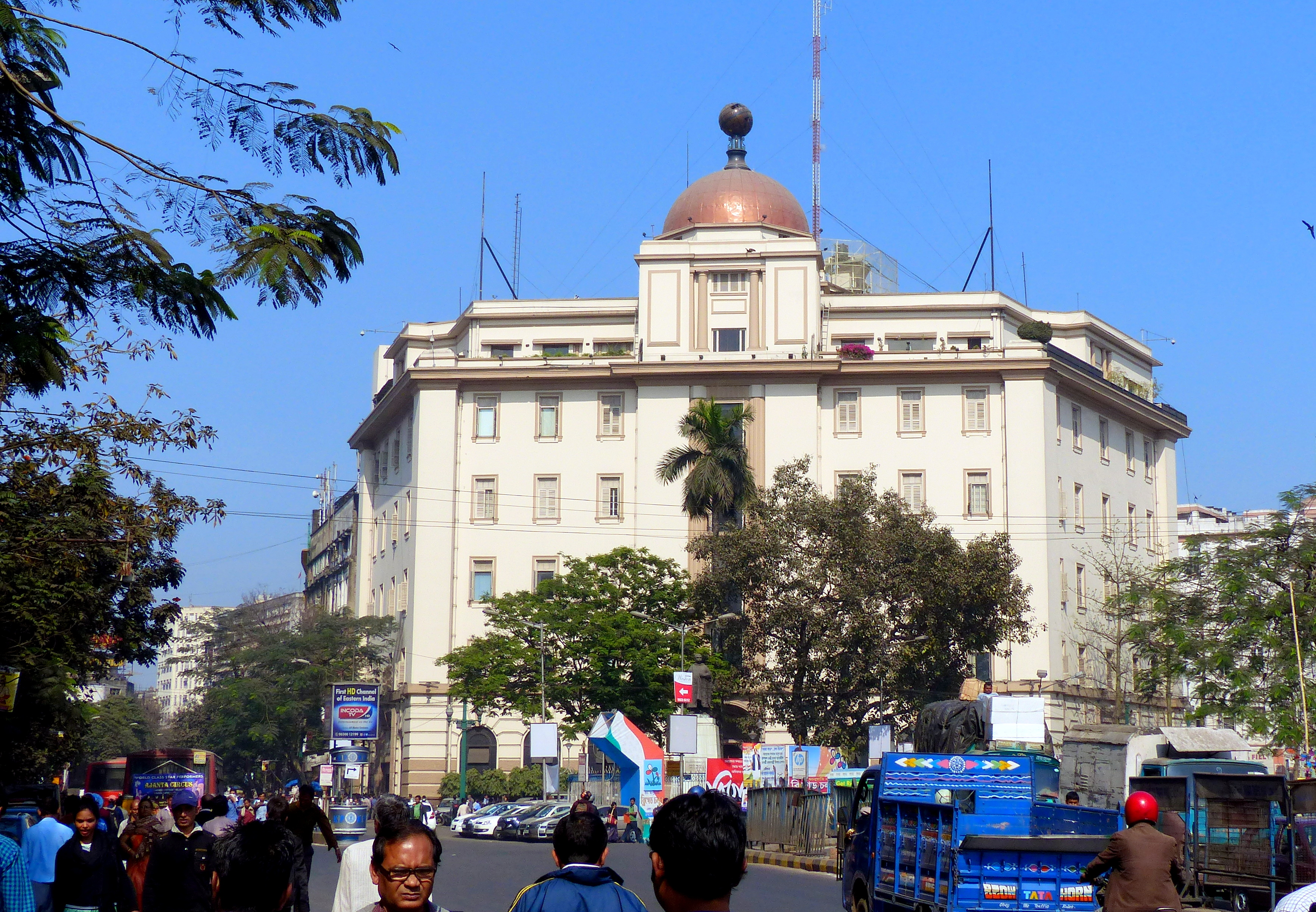
- Victoria House, group's headquarters in Kolkata
- Type: Private
- Industry: Conglomerate
- Founded: 13 July 2011; 15 years ago
- Founder: Sanjiv Goenka
- Headquarters: Kolkata, West Bengal, India
- Area served: India, Bangladesh
- Key people: Sanjiv Goenka (Chairman)
- Products: Electric utility; Retailing; IT Services; Media; Sports; Education
- Revenue: ▲₹26,634 crore (US$2.8 billion) (2021)
- Operating income: ▲₹524 crore (US$54 million) (2020)
- Total assets: ▲₹62,615 crore (US$6.5 billion) (2024)
- Number of employees: 44,500 (2020)
- Subsidiaries: CESC Limited; Phillips Carbon Black Limited; Mohun Bagan Super Giant (80%); Lucknow Super Giants; Open (Indian magazine); Spencer's Retail; Nature's Basket; Firstsource Solutions Limited; Saregama; Quest Mall; International Management Institute; International Management Institute; Durban's Super Giants; Manchester Super Giants (70%)
- Website: www.rpsg.in

RP-Sanjiv Goenka Group (also known as RPSG Group) is an Indian multinational conglomerate headquartered in Kolkata. The founding was the result of a divestiture by RPG Enterprises in 2011. The Group's businesses include power and energy, carbon black manufacturing, retail, IT-enabled services, FMCG, media and entertainment, infrastructure and education.

== History ==
Rama Prasad Goenka established RPG Enterprises in 1979 with Phillips Carbon Black, Asian Cables, Agarpara Jute, and Murphy India as the constituents.

In 1981, the group acquired CEAT Tyres India. KEC International was acquired in 1982. In 1986, it acquired the music company 'Gramophone Company of India Ltd', now known as Saregama. Harrisons Malayalam, the tea and rubber plantations was acquired in 1988. In the following year, Calcutta Electric Supply Corporation (CESC Limited), Raychem Technologies, and Spencer's were acquired.

In 1993, Noida Power Company Limited (NPCL) was formed as a JV between the group and Greater Noida Industrial Development Authority, to distribute power in the Greater Noida region. In 2009, the Group entered into media with the launch of Open Magazine, a weekly current affairs and features magazine.

In 2010, the Group's businesses were divided between Rama Prasad Goenka's sons, Harsh Goenka and Sanjiv Goenka. RP-Sanjiv Goenka Group was founded on 13 July 2011, with Sanjiv Goenka as its chairman.

== Businesses ==
=== Manufacturer ===
- PCBL Chemical Ltd: It is India's largest carbon black manufacturer and a top global player, established in 1960. It produces rubber black and specialty blacks for tires, plastics, and paints..

=== Power ===
- CESC Limited: CESC Limited is engaged in the generation and distribution of electricity in Kolkata and Howrah, West Bengal.
- Haldia Energy Limited: A subsidiary of CESC, HEL operates two 300 MW coal based thermal power plants at Haldia in West Bengal.
- Dhariwal Infrastructure Limited: A subsidiary of CESC, DIL, operates two 300 MW coal based thermal power plants at Chandrapur in Maharashtra.
- Noida Power Company Limited: NPCL is a joint venture between RPSG Group and Greater Noida Industrial Development Authority that distribute power in the Greater Noida region.
- Integrated Coal Mining Ltd: ICML was formed by CESC to mine coal from the Sarisatolli coal block in Ranigunj, West Bengal, for captive supply of coal to its companies.
- Crescent Power Limited: CPL operates a coal washery and a thermal plant near Asansol in West Bengal.
- Surya Vidyut Limited: The renewable energy business of the Group consists of 156 MW of wind power and 27 MW of solar power.

=== Information technology ===
- Firstsource: Firstsource Solutions Limited is a provider of business process management services.

=== Media and entertainment ===
- Saregama India Ltd: It is India's oldest music label and sells a retro-styled digital music player called Carvaan Apart from music, Saregama also produces films under the brand name Yoodlee Films and television content.
- Open: Open is a weekly current affairs and features magazine and the flagship brand of Open Media Network, the media venture of the group.
- Fortune India: The group tied up with Fortune Media Group to publish the business magazine Fortune in India, which was earlier published by the ABP Group.
- Editorji: Launched in 2018, Editorji is a digital news player.

=== Consumer and retail ===
- Too Yumm! - Guiltfree Industries Ltd: It began selling low-calorie food and snacks in 2017.
- Evita - Apricot Foods Limited: Apricot Foods Limited, under the brand name Evita, provides traditional and western snacks and acquired by the RPSG Group in 2017.
- Spencer's Retail: Spencer's Retail is a multi-format retailer company.
- Nature's Basket: Nature's Basket is an Indian grocery retail store chain focused on gourmet food. It was acquired by Spencer's Retail Ltd in May 2019 from the Godrej Group.
- Dr. Vaidya's - Herbolab India Pvt Ltd: CESC Ventures, a part of RPSG Group, acquired a majority stake in Herbolab India Pvt Ltd, makers of ayurvedic medicines and products under the ‘Dr Vaidya's’ brand.

=== Education and infrastructure ===
- Quest Mall: Quest Mall was opened in 2013.
- Woodlands Hospital: The group has at least 80% equity stake in Woodlands Medical Centre through a court-approved restructuring of debt and equity of the firm that runs it.

=== Sports ===
- Mohun Bagan Super Giant: The Group’s first sports asset was ATK, a Kolkata-based football club that competed in the Indian Super League. In 2020, the Group acquired a majority stake in Mohun Bagan Athletic Club Private Limited and dissolved ATK. ATK Mohun Bagan continued in the Indian Super League. From the 2023–24 season, it was rebranded as Mohun Bagan Super Giant.
- Lucknow Super Giants: An IPL franchise that began competing in the 2022 season.
- Durban's Super Giants: An SA20 franchise that has competed since the inaugural season.
- Manchester Super Giants: A franchise in The Hundred, a UK-based cricket league. The RPSG Group acquired a 70% stake in the team in 2025.

Defunct Teams

- RPSG Mavericks Kolkata: Now defunct, RPSG Mavericks Kolkata was one of the six city-based teams in the Ultimate Table Tennis league, India’s premier professional table-tennis competition.
- Rising Pune Supergiant: Rising Pune Supergiant, is a defunct IPL team which played temporarily in the league, over a period of two years.

=== Plantation ===
- Harrisons Malayalam Limited: HML is a plantation company producing tea and rubber besides crops like pineapple, cardamom, pepper and other spices. It has 6 tea estates, 5 tea factories, 5 rubber estates and 3 rubber factories. When the group's businesses were divided between the two brothers, the assets of Harrisons Malayalam was "vertically split" and put under two separate management teams.
