= International Management Institute, New Delhi =

Private business school in New Delhi, India

- Other name: IMI New Delhi
- Motto: ′Shaping global leaders for tomorrow′
- Type: business school
- Established: 1981; 45 years ago
- Founder: RPG Group
- Affiliations: AMBA, AACSB, AICTE, NBA
- Chairman: Sanjiv Goenka
- Dean: Sonu Goyal
- Location: New Delhi, India; 28°32′20.9″N 77°10′52.27″E
- Campus: Urban
- Website: www.imi.edu/delhi/

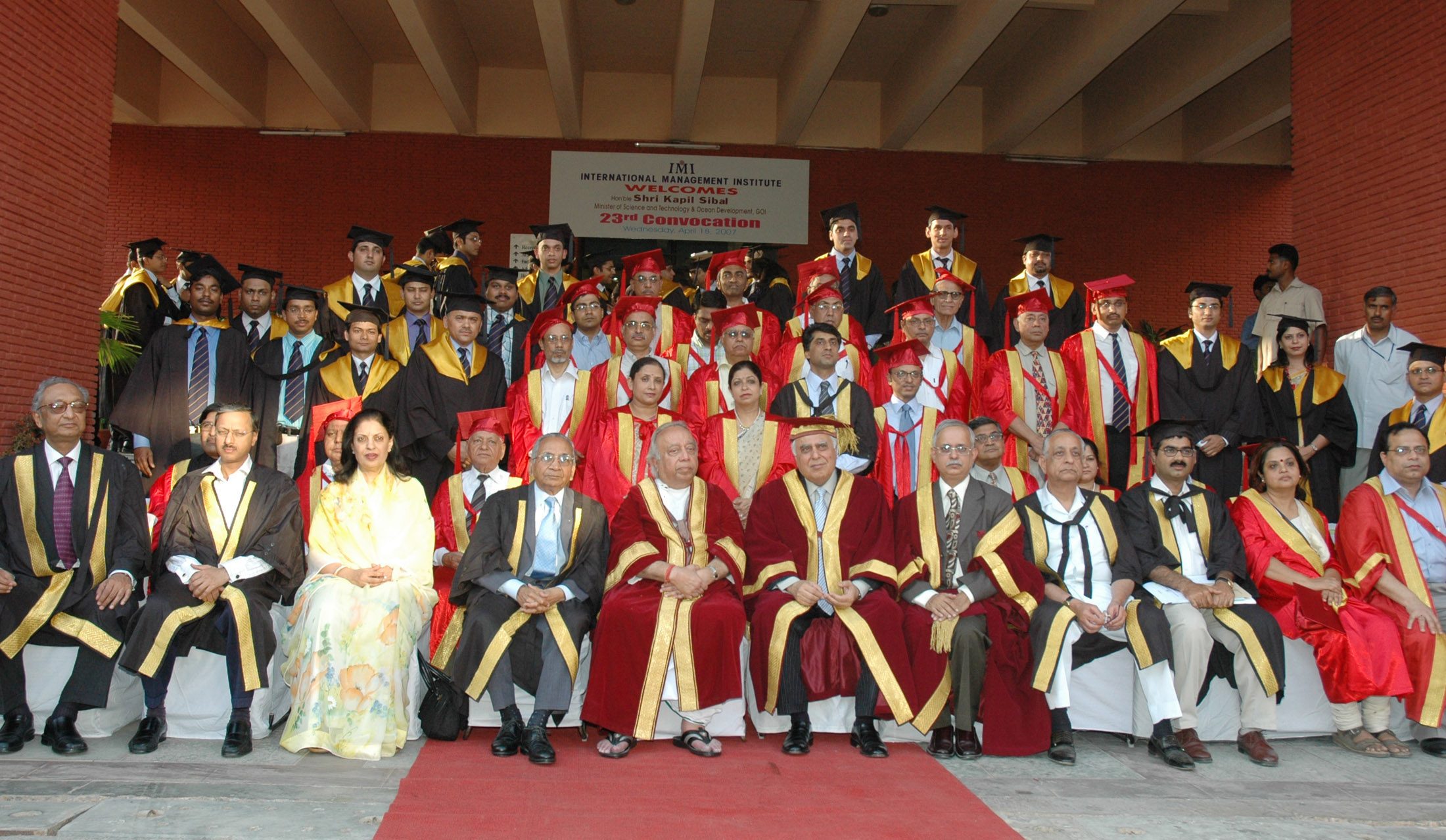
Union Minister for Science & Technology and Earth Sciences, Shri Kapil Sibal at the 23rd Annual Convocation of International Management Institute (IMI), in New Delhi on April 18, 2007

International Management Institute, New Delhi, known as IMI, New Delhi is a private business school located in New Delhi, India. Sanjiv Goenka, Chairman of the RP-Sanjiv Goenka Group, is the Chairman of the IMI Governing Committee.

== History ==
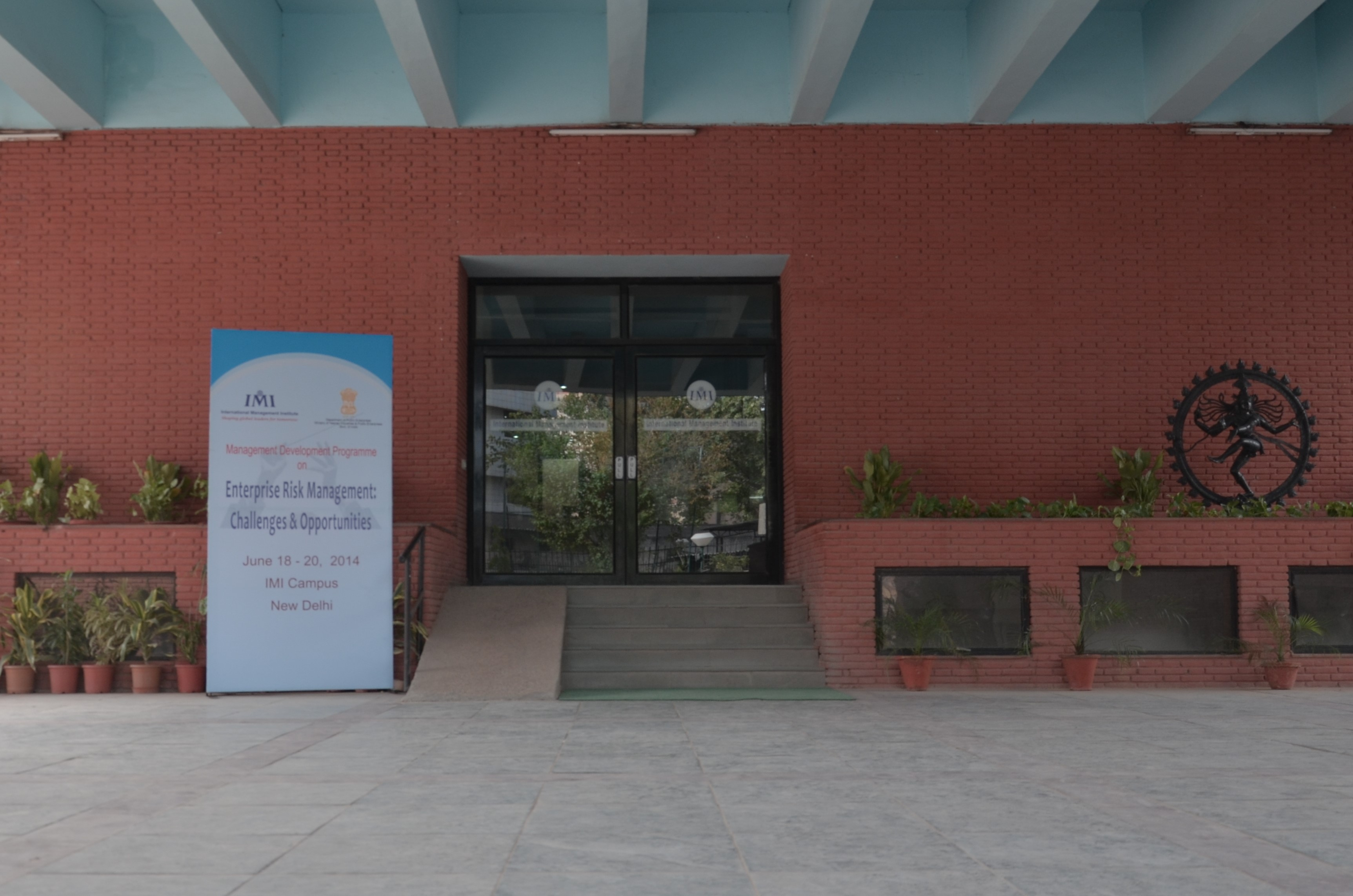
Entrance to the Academic Block

IMI, New Delhi, established in 1981, is India's first corporate sponsored business school. It is sponsored by India’s corporate business group RPG Enterprises. IMI, New Delhi was launched in collaboration with International Management Institute, Geneva (currently International Institute for Management Development (IMD), Lausanne). In 1984, IMI, New Delhi launched its first 52 weeks Executive MBA program, Post Graduate Programme in International Management (PGPIM) which is now known as the Executive Post Graduate Diploma in Management. The year 1993 witnessed the launch of the two year full-time Post Graduate Diploma in Management (PGDM) programme, recognised by AICTE. Subsequently, the PGDM-HRM and PGDM (B&FS) programs were launched in 2006 and 2014 along with Fellow Program in Management approved by AICTE respectively.

== Accreditation ==
IMI, New Delhi is accredited by the Association of MBAs (AMBA) and Association to Advance Collegiate Schools of Business (AACSB) , the National Board of Accreditation (NBA) and the All India Council for Technical Education (AICTE).

== Rankings ==
Institute rankings

Business/Management – India
- NIRF (2021): 26
- Private colleges
- Outlook India (2020): 9

IMI was ranked 26th among management schools in India by the National Institutional Ranking Framework (NIRF) in 2020 and 9th in India by Outlook India's "Top 150 Private MBA Institutions" of 2020. IMI is also considered as one of the decent tier 2 MBA programs in India.

== Academics ==
IMI, New Delhi offers several post-graduate diplomas in management, including a Post Graduate Diploma in Management (PGDM), with related programmes in Human Resource Management (PGDM-HRM) and Banking and Financial Services (PGDM-B&FS).

== Research and Consultancy ==
=== Activities ===
IMI, New Delhi is a member of the South Asian Network of Economic Research Institutes (SANEI) and the Global Development Network (GDN) both of which aim to foster networking and collaboration among economic and policy research institutes. The Institute's journal, Global Business Review is designed to be a forum for the wider dissemination of current management and business practice and research with an emphasis on emerging Economics. It has a circulations of 12,900 copies (including online) and listed in Scopus.

They also feature a scholarly journal in collaboration with Sage Publications known as the Emerging Economy Studies.

== Facilities ==
The IMI, New Delhi Campus includes an amphitheatre as a central node around which the academic block, residence blocks and recreational facilities are all located. The academic complex consists of lecture halls, the Tata Chemicals Computer Centre, BOC Executive Training Room, RPG Auditorium, Williamson Magor Library, Faculty Chambers and Administrative offices. All lecture halls have access to the latest presentation equipment such as DLP Multimedia Projectors, Laptop Notebook Computers, Electronic Copy Boards, OHP Projectors, Internet and Intranet Connectivity and a modern Sound System

IMI, New Delhi has a computing facility for the students on campus with more than 400 plus Wi-Fi enabled computers at locations including hostel rooms, amphitheatre and canteen. IMI Campus has two computer labs which are equipped with more than 100 computers.

The Williamson Magor Library and Information Service (WMLIS) has a stock of about 22000 volumes covering business and management, and also related areas. The 5256 periodical titles subscribed [online + hardcopy versions] by the WML are vital sources for academic research and up-to-date business information. Most Journals are available electronically through the Business Source Complete [EBSCO], Sage, ScienceDirect, JSTOR and Emerald databases. Besides, IMI library is also having a good collection of digital video resources such as BBC Worldwide Training programs etc.

== Admission ==
Admissions for IMI, New Delhi are conducted through Common Admission Test (CAT) and XLRI admission test (XAT). The Institute also accepts Graduate Management Admission Test (GMAT) scores for foreign students and non-resident Indian students. Apart from the test scores, candidates are evaluated on the basis of past academic performance in graduation, class XII & X, extempore speaking, psychometric test, essay writing and personal interview, besides other qualitative parameters for admission shortlists.
