= Sanjiv Goenka =

Indian industrialist (born 1962)

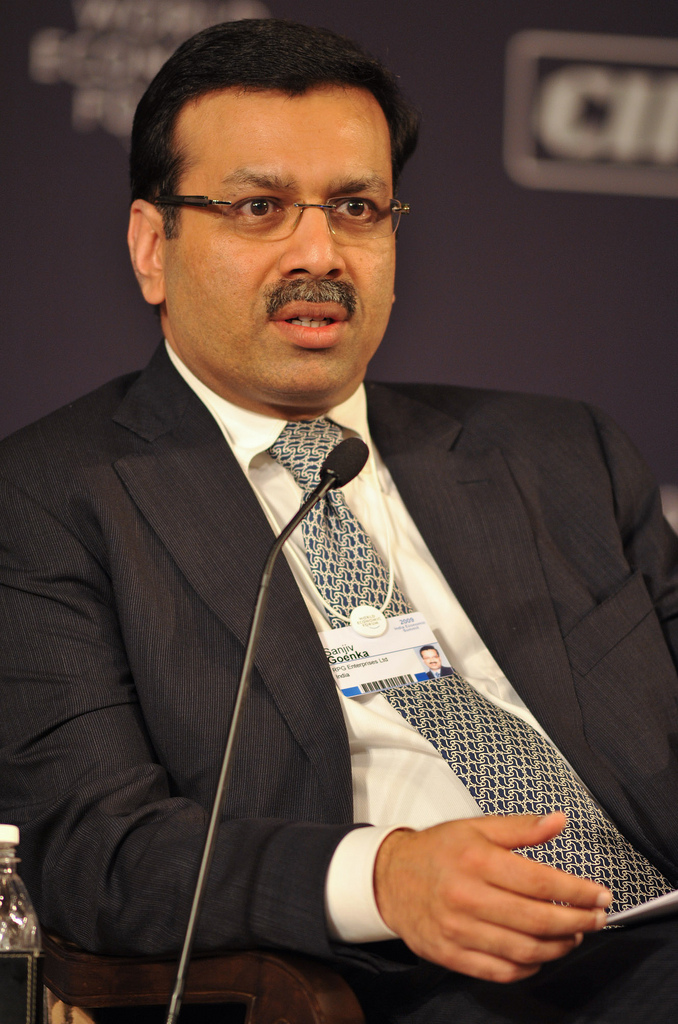
- Goenka at 2009 World Economic Forum
- Born: 29 January 1961 (age 65); Calcutta, West Bengal, India
- Education: St. Xavier's College, Calcutta
- Occupations: Chairman, RPSG Group Investor of Mohun Bagan, Lucknow Super Giants
- Board member of: International Management Institute; Firstsource
- Spouse: Preeti Goenka
- Children: Avarna Jain; Shashwat Goenka
- Parents: Rama Prasad Goenka (father); Sushila Devi Goenka (mother)
- Relatives: Harsh Goenka (brother)
- Awards: Banga Bibhushan (2015)

Sanjiv Goenka (born 29 January 1961) is an Indian billionaire businessman and investor. He is the founder and chairman of RPSG Group, headquartered in Kolkata. He also owns the IPL cricket team Lucknow Super Giants and the ISL football team Mohun Bagan. As per the Forbes 2026 report, he is the 72nd richest person in India and overall 1223rd in the world. He was also a member of Padma Award Committee 2023.

As per Forbes 2024 list of India's 100 richest tycoons, Sanjiv Goenka was ranked 65th with a net worth of $4.9 billion.

== Education ==
An alumnus of St. Xavier's College, Kolkata, Goenka received his Bachelor of Commerce Degree in 1981.

== Board memberships ==
- IIT Kharagpur
- International Management Institute
- Firstsource

== Controversy ==
During the 2024 Indian Premier League, he was embroiled in an alleged controversy in the aftermath of his team Lucknow Super Giants' big defeat against Sunrisers Hyderabad, where he was filmed having an animated conversation with captain KL Rahul.

During the 2026 Indian Premier League season, Goenka faced renewed media and public scrutiny following video clips of an animated conversation with head coach Justin Langer and captain Rishabh Pant in the aftermath of a home defeat. The footage drew criticism from former IPL chairman Lalit Modi, while commentators and media outlets compared the interaction to the 2024 incident with Rahul. Goenka subsequently dismissed rumors of an internal rift, stating that the interaction was taken out of context on social media and that he retained complete confidence in Pant's leadership, instead attributing the team's mid-season struggles to squad injuries.
