= Operation Puttur =

- Part of Anti terror operations in India
Date	5 October 2013
Location	Puttur, Andhra Pradesh 13°27′N 79°33′E
Result	Nabbing of two terrorists

Belligerents
Andhra Pradesh Police; Tamil Nadu Police	Al Ummah

Commanders and leaders
N. Kiran Kumar Reddy; J. Jayalalithaa	Bilal Malik; Panna Ismail

Casualties and losses
1 killed 1 injured	1 injured 1 arrested
- Location in Andhra Pradesh

Operation Puttur was an counter-terrorism operation launched jointly by the Andhra Pradesh and Tamil Nadu Police, which resulted in the capture two extremists belonging to Al Ummah in Puttur on 5 October 2013. The militants were planning to plant bombs at the Tirumala Venkateswara Temple, and commit a murder in Chennai in the name of the "Muslim Defence Force".

== Background ==
Al Ummah, established in 1993, is a designated terrorist organisation in India which was involved in several terrorist attacks in Tamil Nadu. The organisation was responsible for the 1993 bombing of RSS office in Chennai, which killed 11 people and was tied to the Coimbatore serial bomb blasts which killed 58 persons. It was also later tied to a bomb blast in Bangalore in 2013. A group of three members of the outfit–Fakruddin, Panna Ismail and Bilal Malik, had formed a group called "Muslim Defence Force" and were planning to execute various murders in Tamil Nadu.

The group was wanted for various murders in Tamil Nadu over the past few years. On 13 October 2012, Arvinth Reddy, the then state medical wing secretary of the Bharatiya Janata Party (BJP), was stabbed to death in front of his clinic in Vellore. Six accused were arrested in the case later, and one of them confessed to the murder. On 19 March 2013, Murugan, a member of the BJP, was hacked to death by a three-member gang in Paramakudi, which also hurled pipe bombs. Initially, four suspects were arrested, but were released later. On 1 July 2013, Vellaiyappan, the Tamil Nadu state secretary of Hindu Munnani was murdered in Vellore. On 19 July 2013, V. Ramesh, a leader of the BJP, was hacked to death inside his house Salem by an unknown gang.

The Chief Minister of Tamil Nadu constituted a Special Investigation Division of the CID to probe the murder. In December 2013, an investigation by the division pointed towards the role of Fakruddin and his associates Ismail and Malik. The Tamil Nadu Police arrested Fakruddin on 4 October 2013. Fakruddin, who had evaded arrest for eight years, was captured at the Chennai Central railway station. After Fakruddin was arrested, he confessed to the murders. Fakruddin revealed that the militants were planning to strike the Tirumala Venkateswara Temple using umbrella bombs during the annual Brahmostavam festival.

== Operation ==
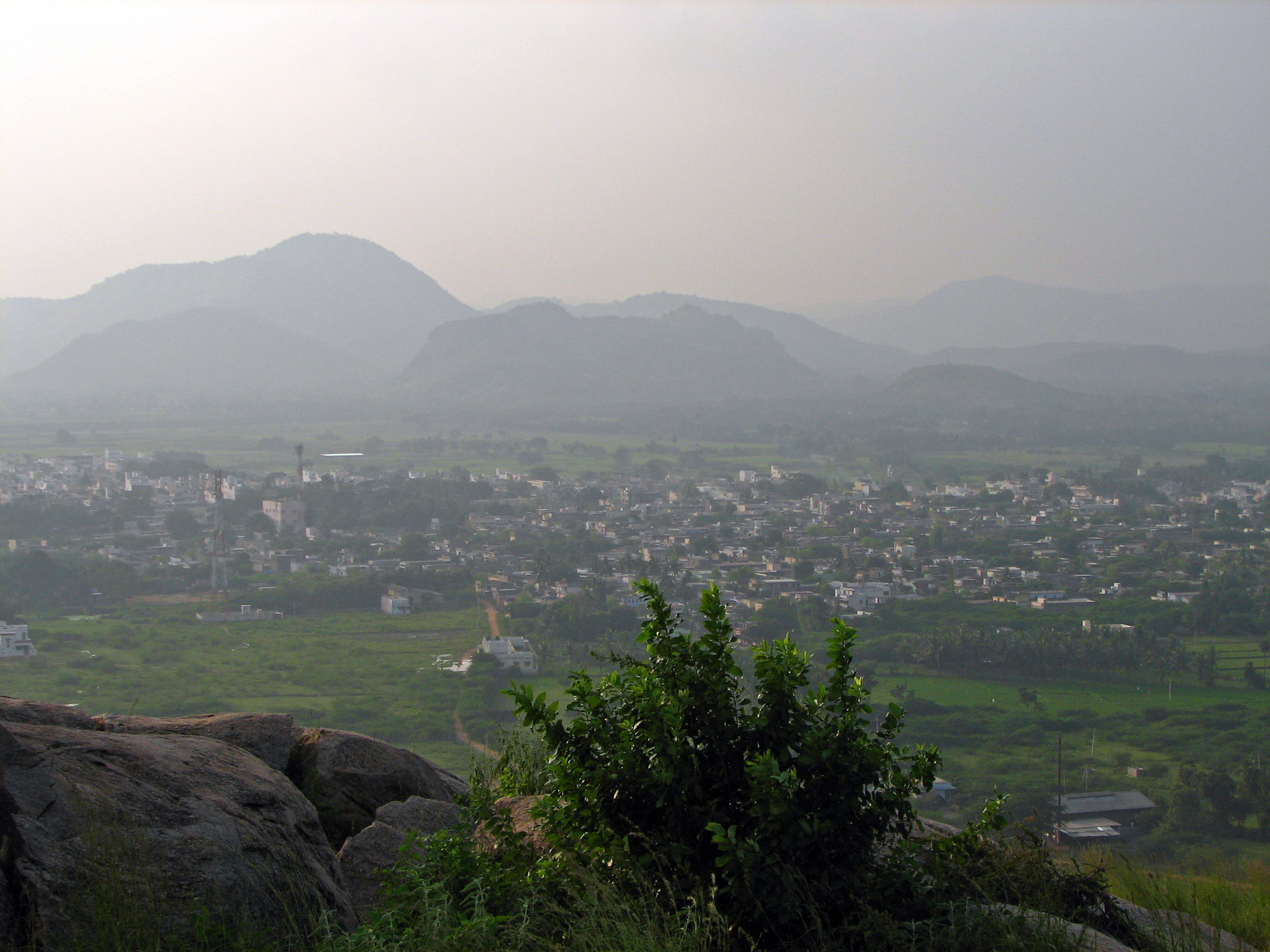
View of Puttur town from the top of a hill

Based on the information provided by Fakruddin, the Tamil Nadu Police team landed in Puttur, on the evening of 4 October 2013, to capture Malik and Ismail. A joint operation of the Tamil Nadu Police and Organisation for Counter Terrorist Operations, a newly formed anti-terror unit of the Andhra Pradesh Police, was planned to capture the militants, who were holed out in a house in Puttur. The operation started at 4 am on 5 October 2013, and the police issued warnings asking the suspects to surrender. The militants used Malik's wife and three children as human shields and fired towards the police. The police later dropped stun grenades and tear gas shells into the house, to flush them out. Malik and Ismail were arrested, and Ismail sustained bullet injuries during the clash. Two other suspects, who were supposedly holed up along with them, was purported to have escaped.

The police were aided by a civilian in the operations. A police constable, who sustained bullet injuries in the operation, died in the hospital later. A police inspector was also injured in the fire. The police found two bombs and a pistol later. The police investigated Malik's wife, who was supposedly running a grocery business in the area, and it was later revealed that she stayed back to help the militants fend off the police.
