= 1997 Coimbatore riots =

Sectarian violence in Tamil Nadu, India

- Date: 29 November 1997 – 1 December 1997
- Location: Coimbatore, Tamil Nadu
- Caused by: Religious tensions, Murder of a Police constable
- Methods: Arson, looting, Murder

Casualties
- Deaths: 18 Muslims, 2 Hindus

The 1997 Coimbatore riots occurred between 29 November 1997 and 1 December 1997 in Coimbatore triggered by a murder of a police constable by three members of radical Islamist terrorist group Al Ummah after the arrest of its General Secretary Ansari. The policemen revolted in response to the murder of the constable and in concert with the members of the Hindu Munnani and the Hindu Makkal Katchi, attacked Muslims and Muslim-owned properties. Clashes erupted between both the communities and the police reportedly opened fire targeting the Muslims killing ten. Many Muslim youth were beaten to death or burnt alive. Muslim-owned businesses in different parts of the city were looted and burnt down. At the end of the riots, 18 Muslims and 2 Hindus lost their lives.

== Background ==
=== Communal divisions ===
In 1991, a Hindu Munnani activist was murdered by a Muslim individual. In 1994, an elderly Muslim man who worked as a social worker was murdered by another Muslim individual, reportedly because he had criticized the extremist activities of Al-Umma. In 1995, a bakery owner was murdered by a Hindu activist in an incident described as a retaliatory act following a bomb blast at a Hindu Munnani office in Chennai.

In 1997, six murders were reported in connection with communal violence that followed the murder of Palani Baba. Separately, following the demolition of the Babri Masjid on 6 December 1992, Al-Umma members were reportedly involved in violent incidents. Subsequent police raids led to the recovery of weapons and pamphlets outlining the organization's objectives.

Police reportedly seized a cache of weapons and explosive materials in Coimbatore, including gelatine sticks, 44 kilograms of explosives, 178 Molotov cocktails (petrol bombs), 37 aruvals (billhooks), 18 daggers and ₹45,500 in cash. Hundreds of pamphlets were also reportedly seized from the residence of Hyder Ali, a member of Al-Umma.

The activities of the Hindu Munnani, the Hindu Makkal Katchi, and the RSS escalated but went unchallenged during the Jayalalitha government. Al-Umma and the Jihad Committee emerged as fundamentalist responses to this. The Hindutva organisations had been engaged in a concerted effort to spread Hindu nationalism as a political mobilization tactic for a decade before the violence. The Hindu Munnani and other Sangh Parivar groups have tried to gain political influence by increasing violence on Tamil Nadu's minority communities in Coimbatore and other southern districts. The Muslim fundamentalist organisations were also accused of receiving assistance from foreign forces detrimental to the unity of the country. After the demolition of Babri Masjid in 1992, Islamic outfits strengthened their ranks. The Hindu Munnani urged Hindus not to shop in Muslim-owned business, Muslim businesses felt intimidated. The Hindu Munnani formed associations of Hindu traders. Reportedly, there were stabbings and counter-stabbings between the youth of Hindu Munnani and Al-Ummah. The Hindu Munnani and Al-Umma grew, feeding on each other's mischief. The city's environment was communalized as a result of the Sangh Parivar's communal propaganda and the Muslim fundamentalist reaction, this damaged the city's history of class-based campaigns and liberal heritage.

Over the years, a portion of the police force in Coimbatore became communalized. Chief minister M. Karunanidhi claimed that 50-60 people were murdered in the past 10 years before the violence and he blamed the extremist elements in both the sides.

=== Constable murder ===
Between 8 and 10 p.m. on 29 November 1997, while police was conducting vehicle checks on Vysial Street, rumours had circulated in the Kottaimedu area that Ansari, a member of Al-Umma, had been assaulted by police at B-1 Bazaar Police Station. Supporters of Ansari and members of Al-Umma who were at the organisation's office reacted to the rumour by proceeding to the Ukkadam–Vincent Road junction. They pulled Traffic Police Constable Selvaraj down from a traffic police shelter and stabbed him repeatedly in the chest, abdomen and other parts of his body. The assailants damaged fluorescent lights and the glass windows of nearby bakeries and tea stalls before fleeing the scene. Subsequently, a crowd of youths gathered on Vincent Road in Ukkadam, shouting challenges at the police and allegedly inciting violence.

== Riots ==
On 29 November, around 15 traffic policemen destroyed fruit and vegetable pushcarts run by Muslim vendors in Ukkadam. Hindu fundamentalists joined the policemen and started looting small businesses.

On 30 November, policemen in charge of traffic and those in charge of the control room all abandoned their posts. They sat in a dharna, wearing black badges and raising slogans. They declined the officers orders to come back to work. Wives and children of police officers marched from the Police Training School to the Police Commissioner's headquarters, shouting slogans. Violence exploded in several parts of the city shortly after. Muslims and Hindus clashed, tossing stones, petrol bombs and soda bottles at each other. Officers began shooting, supposedly targeting at Muslims which led to a total of 10 Muslim youth were killed. Many Muslim youth were beaten to death or burnt alive. Muslim-owned businesses in different parts of the city were targeted in an organized attack. Many Muslim shops and businesses were burned down. The looters sold the things that they had looted from the shops and they piled up the things which they could not take with them on the street and set them ablaze. Pavement stalls had been damaged. Mosques and temples were also attacked.

A huge crowd of policemen gathered outside of the hospital where the constable's body was kept. Activists from Hindu Makkal Katchi and Hindu Munnani were present outside the hospital in large numbers. When the DMK MLA for Coimbatore West, C. T. Dhandapani and his son arrived in the hospital, they were attacked by a mob of Hindu fundamentalists as the police stood by and watched. He was admitted to the hospital with head injuries. His car was set on fire, along with another car. Arjun Sampath, a former general secretary of BJP in Coimbatore and the founder of Hindu Makkal Katchi was jailed in the Vellore central prison for attempted murder of C.T. Dhandapani. The mob also attacked Muslim youth who came to the hospital injured in the police firing, several Muslims were stabbed and lynched to death, one was doused in petrol and was set on fire.

On the night of 30 November, the Rapid Action Force (RAF) and the Army reached the city. Criminals continued robbing shops that night till the next morning, playing hide and seek with the Army.

On 2 December, the bodies of 17 Muslims were buried. On 4 December, the situation returned to normalcy.

A total of 18 Muslims and 2 Hindus were killed. Properties valued over ₹500 crore was destroyed, according to the executive director of the Indian Chamber of Commerce and Industry's Coimbatore chapter.

== Investigation by People's Union for Civil Liberties ==
As per the human rights organisation People's Union for Civil Liberties (PUCL), police used the civil disturbance to take revenge on Muslim merchants who had avoided paying bribes. Houses and shops owned by Muslims were robbed and set on fire in front of police, and riot victims were hacked to death at the general hospital by police and Hindu rioters. The report said that a group of the police force, in collusion with Hindu fundamentalists, acted in an outrageously sectarian and unconstitutional manner for which no official effort has been made to bring them to justice. A police officer and 20 other officers were seen firing at Muslims without having instructions to do so. Muslim boys who fled to see the shops of their relatives or friends being ransacked or burned were shot without a purpose. PUCL's M. Mohammed Abubacker, represented PUCL before Justice Gopalakirushnan Comittee. Abubacker challenged the credibility of the police officers' evidence, arguing that the firing had been unnecessary and contrary to established procedures. However, the report considered these challenges insufficiently substantiated and noted that most of the individuals who submitted affidavits were not eyewitnesses to the events.

== Aftermath ==
The 1998 Coimbatore bombings by Al-Ummah were considered as a response to the riots.

== See also ==
- 1990 Madras riots

== Bibliography ==
- Engineer, Asghar Ali (1998). "Communalism and Communal Violence, 1997". Economic and Political Weekly. 33 (1/2): 11–13. ISSN 0012-9976. JSTOR 4406256.
- United States Department of State (2000). Annual Report, International Religious Freedom 1999, Report Submitted to the Committee on International Relations, U.S. House of Representatives and the Committee on Foreign Relations, United States Senate by the Department of State in Accordance with Section 102 of the International Religious Freedom Act of 1998. U.S. Government Printing Office: U.S. Government Printing Office. ISBN 978-0-16-060235-1.
