= K. Radhakrishnan (police officer) =

Indian Police Service Officer

Dr. K. Radhakrishnan
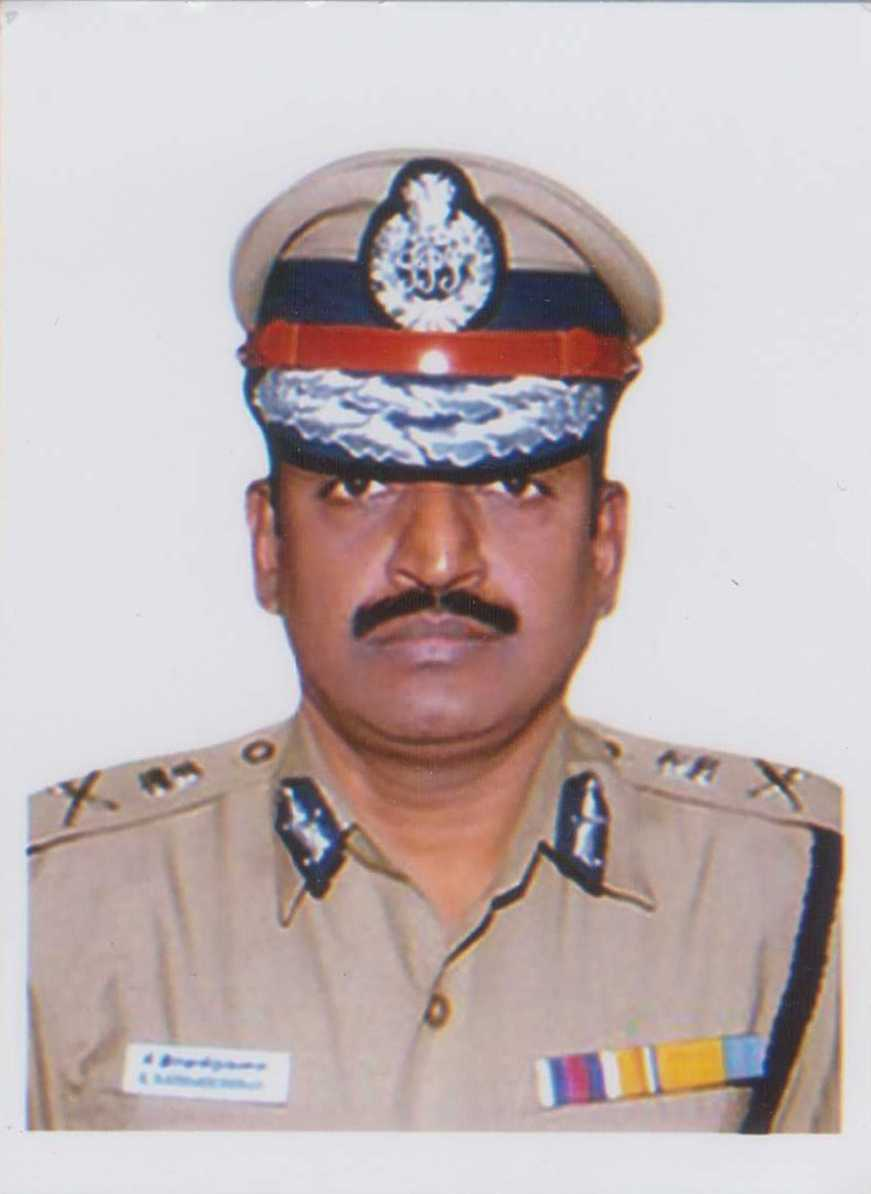
- Police career
- Department: Indian Police Service
- Rank: Director General of Police
- Awards: President's medal for "Meritorious Service", Chief Minister's medal for "Outstanding Service", Queen's Award for Innovation in Police Training and Development, 2002, Queen's Award for Innovation in Police Training and Development, 2004, Community Policing Award, 2009.

K. Radhakrishnan

Director General of Police - Civil Supplies CID, Tamil Nadu
- In office 16 February 2016 – 31 July 2017

ADGP - Civil Supplies, CID, Tamil Nadu
- In office June 2011 – February 2016

ADGP - Law and Order, Tamil Nadu
- In office May 2009 – May 2011

Commissioner of Police, Chennai City
- In office November 2008 – May 2009

ADGP-Civil Supplies, CID, Tamil Nadu
- In office September 2008 – November 2008

Inspector-General of Police, Law and Order, North Zone, Tamil Nadu
- In office 2006–2008

Inspector-General of Police, Vigilance & Anti-corruption, Chennai
- In office 2002–2006

Deputy Inspector-General of Police, Police Training College, Chennai
- In office 2001–2002

Commissioner of Police, Coimbatore City
- In office 1998–2001

Deputy Inspector-General of Police, Trichy
- In office 1997–1998

Superintendent of Police, Vellore
- In office 1995–1997

Superintendent of Police, Chengalpattu
- In office 1994–1995

Superintendent of Police, Dharmapuri
- In office 1993–1994

Superintendent of Police, Sivagangai
- In office 1991–1993

Superintendent of Police, Tuticorin
- In office 1990–1991

Superintendent of Police, Ramanathapuram
- In office 1988–1990

Assistant Superintendent of Police, Dindigul
- In office 1986–1988

Personal details
- Born: 21 July 1958 (age 68) Srivilliputhur, Tamil Nadu, India
- Education: National Police Academy; University of Madras; Madurai University

Dr. K. Radhakrishnan, IPS (born 21 July 1958) is an Indian Police Service Officer of the batch of 1983, belonging to the Tamil Nadu Cadre and former Director General of Police of the Civil Supplies, CID department of Tamil Nadu from which he retired in 2017. Dr. K. Radhakrishnan did his PhD from the Department of Criminology from the University of Madras for seminal research on 'Tactical and Strategic Police Response to Communal Violence: Coimbatore, a case study', in October 2009. He received the Queen's Award for Innovation in Police Training and Development in 2002 and 2004.

== Education ==
Growing up in the semi-urban town and municipality of Srivilliputhur, Radhakrishnan was the youngest child of a family of seven. He attended the Government Higher Secondary School in Ammapatti, Srivilliputhur. He majored in English for his undergraduate study in St. Johns College, Palayamkottai, Tirunelveli. Later pursued a Master of Science in Chemistry from Madurai University and graduated in 1979. He took up a brief stint in teaching in one of the first schools to be established in Panaikulam (the school is now run by the government under the name Bahurdeen Government Higher Secondary School) while preparing simultaneously for the All India Competitive Civil Services Examination. Later on in his police career, Radhakrishnan was awarded a Doctorate of Philosophy for seminal research on "Tactical and Strategic Police Response to Communal Violence: Coimbatore, a case study" by the University of Madras in October 2009.

== Police career ==
Radhakrishnan joined the Indian Police Service in the batch of 1983. He underwent Police Training as Assistant Superintendent of Police at the National Police Academy (NPA), Hyderabad from 1983 to 1984. He was later inducted into the para-military training at Indore, Tekhlapur and New Delhi. He also went through army training at Kargil & Leh (Indo-Pak border in Jammu & Kashmir) and Chushul & Sikkim (Indo-China border). Between the two years 1986-1988, he took up position as Assistant Superintendent of Police of the Dindigul District. During this tenure he led a raid into training centers of the Liberation Tigers of Tamil Eelam, LTTE and seized arms and ammunition worth Rs.20,00,000. Following this, he was promoted to the post of Superintendent of Police of Ramanathapuram district (1988-1990) during which he was involved in arranging accommodation of 1,00,000 Tamil refugees from Sri Lanka who entered the district after the de-induction of the Indian Peace Keeping Force (IPKF). In a dramatic midnight encounter with the LTTE on 18 February 1990, he led the mission that saved lives of Eelam People's Revolutionary Liberation Front (EPRLF) militants and their leader K. Pathmanabha, who were lodged in the Mandapam Refugee Camp. His further two year stints in the position of Superintendent of Police in the Districts of Tuticorin, Sivagangai, Dharmapuri, Chengalpattu and Vellore for a period of ten years (1988-1997) in six communally sensitive districts of Tamil Nadu yielded results in the maintenance of peace and prevention of communal and caste violence in the regions. During this period he was proven instrumental in the leading to the arrests of two of the assassins of the former Prime Minister Rajiv Gandhi and LTTE terrorists who escaped from prison in Chennai. In July 1997, Radhakrishnan was promoted to the function of the Deputy Inspector-General of Police in the Trichy Range, which comprised four districts, during which he successfully held against the Tamil Nadu Liberation Army, leading to the arrests of 50 TNLA members and its leader.

In 1998 Radhakrishnan assumed charge as the Commissioner of Police of Coimbatore City just after the Coimbatore Serial Blasts of 1998. In 2002, he was promoted to Inspector-General of Police in Vigilance & Anti-Corruption, Chennai and in 2006 moved to the department of Law & Order North Zone, Tamil Nadu. Against the background of the Mumbai blasts of 2008 when the threat extended to Chennai as well, Mr. Radhakrishnan was appointed as the Commissioner of Police, Chennai City. In September 2008 he was appointed the Additional Director General of Police Civil Supplies, CID. Currently he is working as the Director General of Police, Civil Supplies, CID.

== Coimbatore Blasts of 1998 ==
=== Background ===
Coimbatore City, popularly known as the "Manchester of South India" due to its booming textile industry, witnessed several debilitating communal riots from 1980, culminating in the serial blasts of 1998 that claimed more 50 lives and injured hundreds. Al Ummah, a militant, fundamentalist organisation that took birth in the immediate aftermath of Babri Masjid destruction at Ayodhya, murdered a Hindu Police Constable on 29 November 1997 at Coimbatore in reaction to which, the police constabulary immediately struck work. According to the various investigative reports that emerged post the attacks, Hindu militants of the region exploited the security vacuum by targeting Muslims and their properties; 18 Muslims (and 4 Hindus) lost their lives at Coimbatore. In an apparent retaliation, the Muslim fundamentalist organisation Al Ummah, within 2½ month engineered serial blasts on 14 February 1998 in the run-up to the Parliamentary Elections killing 63 (53 Hindus), maiming 245 and destroying properties worth several crores of rupees. The confusion and the communal instability of the region, shattered peace, trade, commerce, industry and people's morale. Fearing a Hindu backlash, the Army and several paramilitary forces moved into Coimbatore leading to a period of unrest and uncertainty.

=== Community Policing Strategies ===
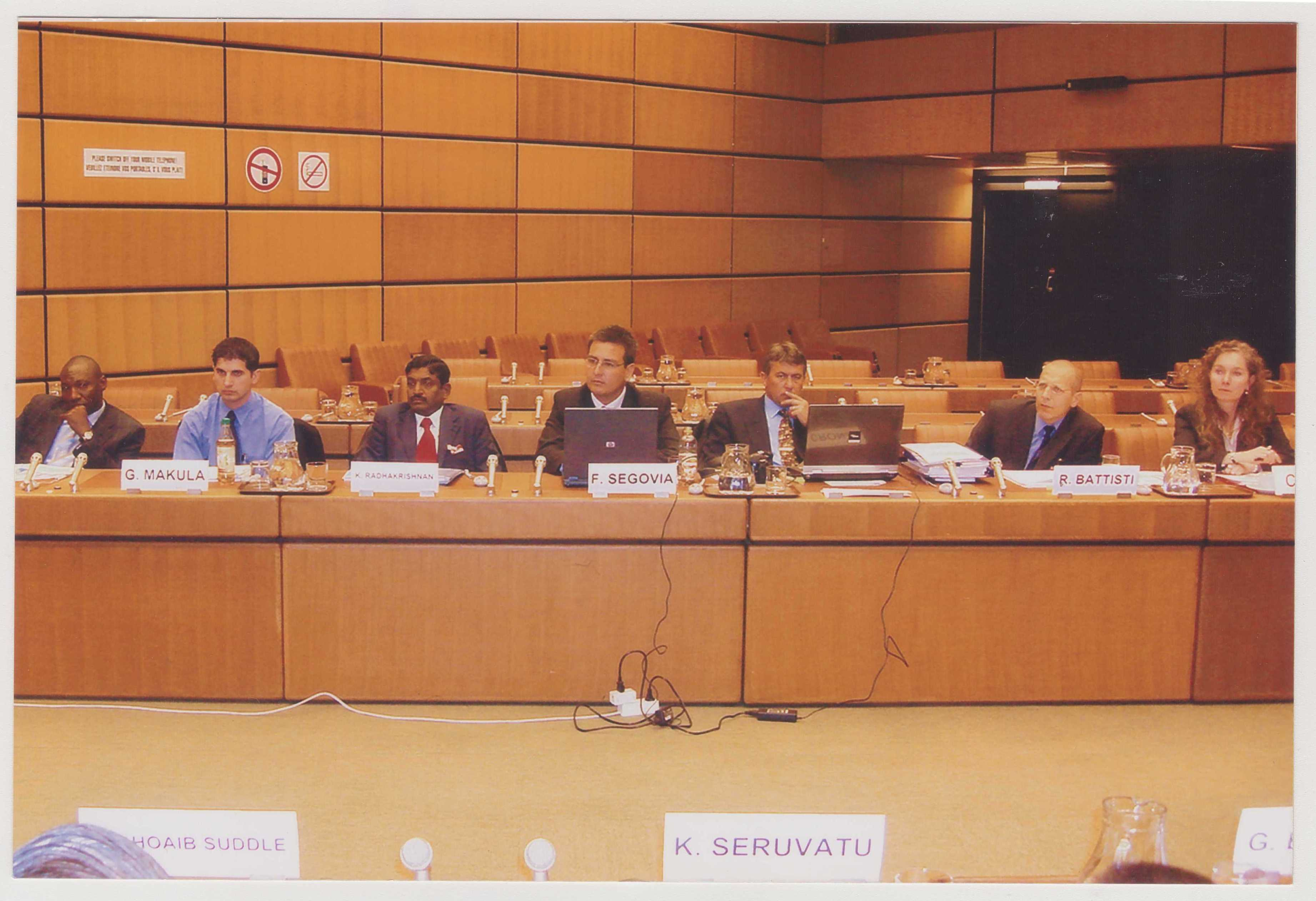
Dr. K. Radhakrishnan in a conference in Vienna, presenting his work on Community Policing

Stepping in as the Commissioner of Police of Coimbatore City in the immediate aftermath of the serial blasts, K. Radhakrishnan insulated the police force involved in the arrests from the intervention of political parties, by forming a 50-member arrest team, which worked only with the Special Investigation Team in the probe. 167 militants, including 5 suicide bombers and the accused of the November 1997 murders, who were involved in the series of events leading up to the 1998 blasts were arrested. Organising extensive searches that led to the seizure of 684 lethal weapons, 584 bombs, 20 firearms, one lakh detonators, cash, addresses of the benefactors of the accused, fundamentalist literature, incriminating documents and photographs, he and his team made sure that by video-graphing all the raids, there was no violation of code of conduct or human rights. Upon realising the importance of hard intelligence in dealing with communally active zones, K. Radhakrishnan innovated the proactive concept of community policing aimed for a police force's partnership with the civil society in maintaining a peaceful religious climate. The action plan aimed at involving the community in policing spheres, in resolving the Hindu-Muslim discord and in bringing about a life free of communal violence for the residents of Coimbatore. In April 1998, he established 78 Area Committees (ACs) with 4000 partners in 72 wards with the objective of using the community to resolve conflicts. AC meetings were conducted once in a fortnight in sensitive zones and once in a month in other areas under each local Inspector's supervision. This forum helped the police discuss current problems with the civilians and in exchange, provided them with valuable information on new, emerging communal dimensions. The pro-active focus was expanded with the formation of City Vigilance Committees (CVC) in mid-1998. CVCs were created in every police station limit with 5000 students and youths as members. Bestowed with identity cards, caps, batons and taught basic policing methods, these 200 to 250 CVC volunteers patrolled the streets every night along with the police. This augmented safety and security and brought down the incidence of violent property offences by 30 percent. Round the clock vigil was thus maintained by deploying CVC members and police personnel and this new method of involving the civil society in policing proved useful in removing communal biases and false allegations. Besides the student community, CVC volunteers were involved in frisking passengers, checking baggage at important junctions, railway stations and bus stands during turbulent times. CVCs visibly improved the visibility of policing in the documented 'sensitive' zones.

=== Honors and Recognitions ===
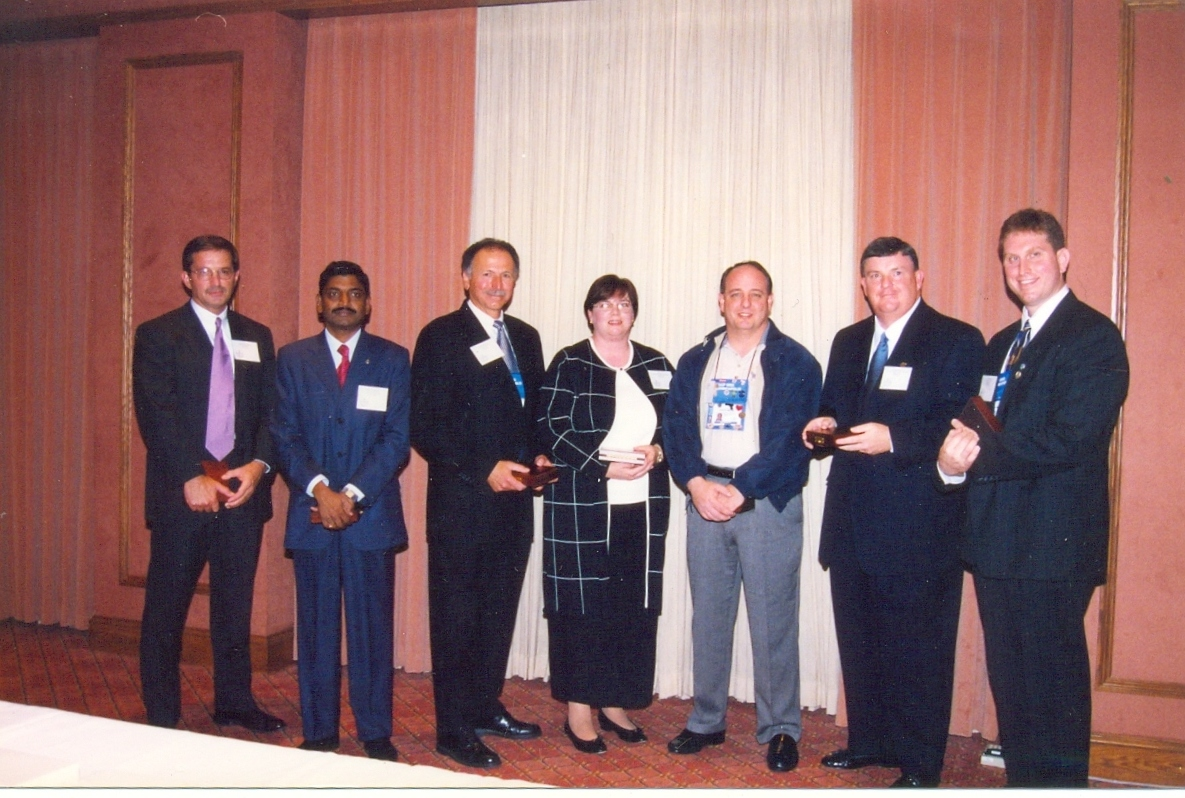
K. Radhakrishnan during the IACP conference.

The efficiency of community policing as a useful strategy in policing not just communally-sensitive zones but also other areas, was recognised by TNPA and the NPA with the setting up and expansion of community-police trainings under the project: "Communal (Religious) Relations Management Training for the Police through Community Engagement" across the state of Tamil Nadu. In January 2001 K. Radhakrishnan was invited to make a presentation in the UN Headquarters at Vienna on his work under the topic "Integration with diversity in Policing". His initiatives in Coimbatore won him the Community Policing Award 2003, from the International Association of Chiefs of Police (IACP), Alexandria, Virginia, United States, following which, he was honoured at the Annual Conference of IACP at Minneapolis, Minnesota, United States. K. Radhakrishnan's project was recognised by the Queen's Award for Innovation in Police Training and Development-2004, making him the only officer in all of Commonwealth Nations to have won the award consecutively.

== Women Police Empowerment ==
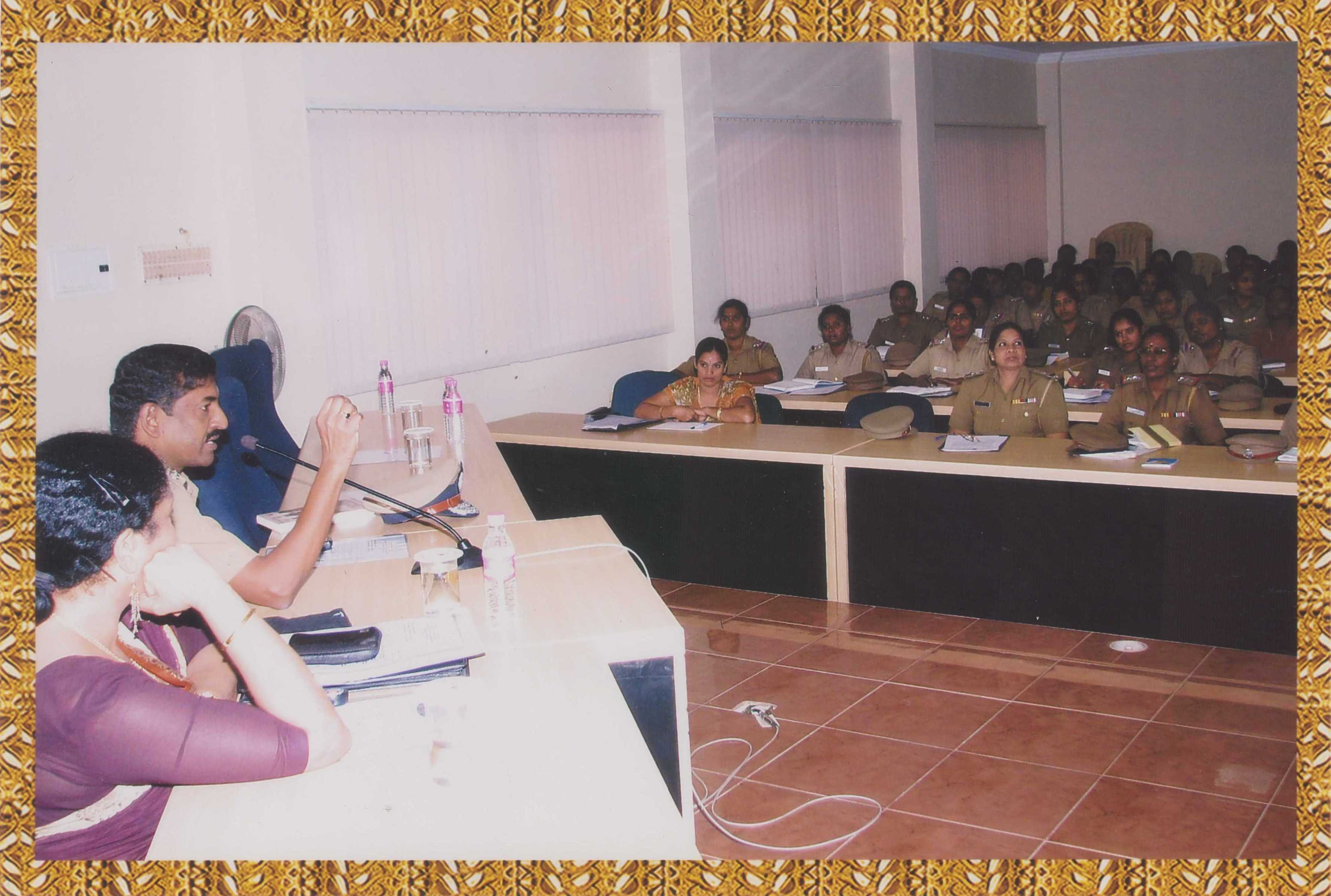
K. Radhakrishnan during one of the gender sensitisation trainings

A significant portion of K. Radhakrishnan's career has been dedicated to empowerment of the women police personnel of Tamil Nadu. Women Police, who were inducted into the Tamil Nadu Police force in 1973 were initially concerned with protection of accused women in police custody and in assisting investigating officers during interrogation and examination of women prisoners/witnesses. However, with the introduction of All Women Police Stations (AWPSs) from 1993, their numbers escalated and correspondingly, the significance of their roles increased too with their duties covering resolution of family disputes and handling of dowry and other domestic-abuse issues. In 2001 when the women police force was integrated into the regular police force, K. Radhakrishnan (then, the Deputy Inspector General of Police, Police Training College, Chennai) was tasked with gender-sensitization of 4200 women police personnel who were in service, through a 42-week long gender sensitization program held at the Police Training College. Upon receiving an excellent reception to the workshops, the Government of Tamil Nadu extended the program to cover the existing police force in its entirety which numbered to a lakh. The program proved to be a useful platform through which the various inadequacies of the women police personnel in handling family disputes and other domestic conflicts were thrown into light. Leveraging the experiences of this program, K. Radhakrishnan, upon consultation with experts in the field of mediation, negotiation, arbitration and counseling, kick-started the demonstrative project: "Web-based e-training programs in dispute resolution, interviewing and record keeping for officers in all-women police stations in Tamil Nadu: a Pilot Project". This project was his entry for the United Kingdom Home Office's award: Queen's Award for Innovation in Police Training and Development. K. Radhakrishnan's project, competing under the head "The use of new technologies to overcome barriers to deliver training and lifelong learning" amongst entries by officers belonging to 53 member nations of the Commonwealth, was the recipient of the prestigious award in 2002. Awarded with a competitive grant of 15,000 pounds, he successfully implemented the project as a program in Tamil Nadu. Several DVDs containing interactive modules on dispute resolution, interviewing and record-keeping were released to various police stations during implementation. The project's implementation allowed women officers, access to training materials from their station premises, which eliminated the need to transport large numbers of officers to the state-capital for the purpose of training. Select officers were trained in familiarization workshops that were held in Chennai and were presided over by K. Radhakrishnan and the Queen's Award project director Dr. Mangai Natarajan. Study materials and user-guides were posted on the project website, with access to chat-room and forum facilities for exchange of guidance and support between officials in handling dispute and abuse cases. Computers with keyboards were set up at each station in Tamil Nadu, along with adequate telephone lines and internet connections, making this a pioneering project in online-police training in India. In recognition of his efforts, the then Hon'ble Chief Minister of Tamil Nadu, Jayalalithaa felicitated him with a silver plaque on the occasion of Tamil Nadu Police Medal Parade, 2002 at Chennai. With the project's results garnering acclaim amongst the media and government intelligentsia, it was covered in police educational literature and various research journals. K. Radhakrishnan was invited to discuss the benefits and results of this experiment in conferences both in India and abroad.

== Civil Supplies Department ==
K. Radhakrishnan began his long foray into the Civil Supplies Department of Tamil Nadu in June 2001 after the Government introduced the free-rice scheme to all family card holders, a noble scheme to eradicate hunger from the midst of the people. This position, he holds until today as the Director General of Police. Constituted under the Essential Commodities Act 1955, the Tamil Nadu government pioneered setting up a dedicated Civil Supplies Crime Investigation Department of police to act against hoarders and black-marketeers. Immediately a year after K. Radhakrishnan assumed office in 2011, there were taken efforts under his leadership to significantly curb smuggling of essential commodities. These efforts were recognized at the Chief Ministers' conference on Internal Security in 2012 and at the conference of Ministers for Food and Consumers Affairs on Tackling Food Inflation in 2014 held at Delhi. The effectiveness of the Civil Supplies department post K. Radhakrishnan's ascension to the department's leadership was recognized by the Department of Consumer Affairs, Government of India in several correspondences to other state governments wherein it proposed the replication of Tamil Nadu's policing system to ensure zero tolerance towards black marketing, hoarding and profiteering in the trade and supply of essential commodities.

== Post-Retirement Appointments ==
In January 2022, The Government of Tamil Nadu appointed the Fifth Police Commission to go into the entire gamut of functioning of the Police Department and make it more responsive to the needs of the public and give a report with recommendations. Dr. K.Radhakrishnan was appointed as one of the members of the Commission that was headed by Hon’ble Justice Mr.CT Selvam, a retired Judge of the High Court of Madras. The Commission submitted its 1st Report on 18.03.2023 and its final Report on 03.01.2025 with 965 recommendations aimed at toning up the Police Administration. The report covered the following subjects among others: Recruitment, Training, Pay and Allowances, Manpower, Mobility and Communication, Transfers and Promotions, Procurement, Skill up-gradation, Women Police Empowerment, Management of Police Stations, Modernization of Police Force, Emerging Technologies and Role of Artificial Intelligence in Police, Corruption, Police Accountability, Police Leadership, Police Image, etc.

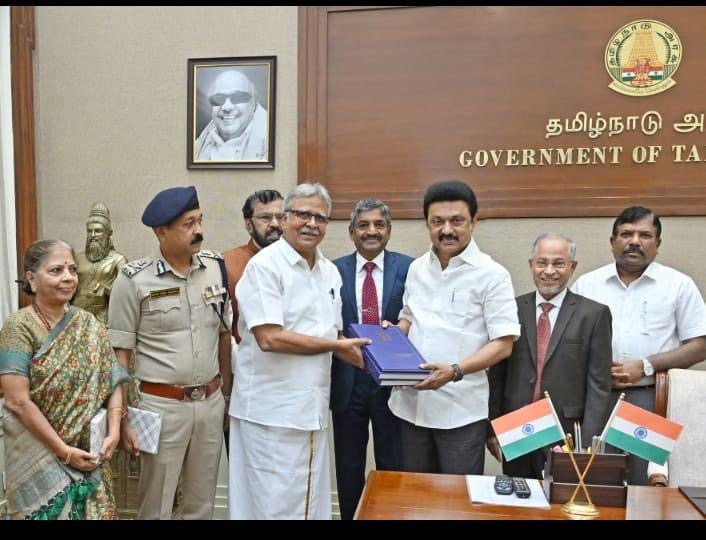
Dr.K.Radhakrishnan is part of the panel that submits the final report of the Fifth Police Commission to Chief Minister M.K.Stalin in Chennai on January 3rd, 2025

== Promotions ==
Indian Police Service
Insignia	Rank	Date
	Additional Director-General of Police – ADGP	September 2008
	Inspector-General – IG	2002
	Deputy Inspector-General – DIG	1997
	Superintendent of Police – SP	1988
	Assistant Superintendent of Police – ASP	1986

== Positions held ==
Police appointments
Director General of Police - Civil Supplies CID, Tamil Nadu
16 February 2016 – present
Additional Director General of Police (ADGP)-Civil Supplies, CID, Tamil Nadu
June 2011 - February 2016
Additional Director General of Police (ADGP) - Law and Order, Tamil Nadu
May 2009 – May 2011
Commissioner of Police, Chennai
November 2008 – May 2009
ADGP-Civil Supplies, CID, Tamil Nadu
September 2008- November 2008
Inspector-General of Police (IGP) -Law and Order, Tamil Nadu
2006- 2008
Inspector-General of Police (IGP) -Vigilance & Anti-Corruption Chennai
2002-2006
Deputy Inspector-General of Police (DIG) - Police Training College Chennai, Tamil Nadu
2001- 2002
Commissioner of Police - Coimbatore, Tamil Nadu
1998-2001
Deputy Inspector-General of Police (DIG), Trichy
1997-1998
Superintendent of Police, Vellore
1995-1997
Superintendent of Police, Chengalpattu
1994-1995
Superintendent of Police, Dharmapuri
1993-1994
Superintendent of Police, Sivagangai
1991-1993
Superintendent of Police, Tuticorin
1990-1991
Superintendent of Police, Ramanathapuram
1988-1990
Assistant Superintendent of Police (ASP) - Dindigul, Tamil Nadu
1986-1988

== Awards and honors ==
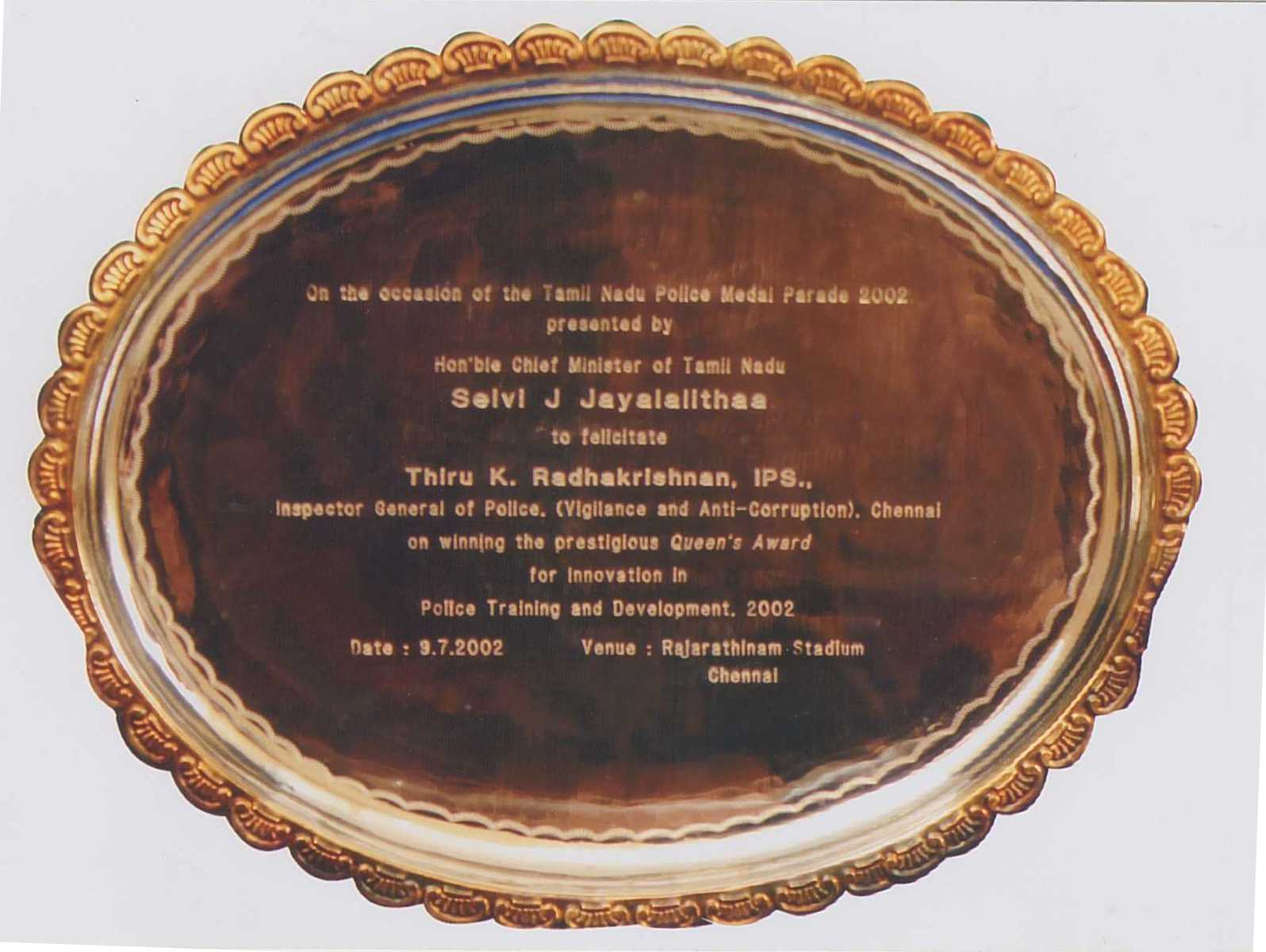
Tamil Nadu police medal parade

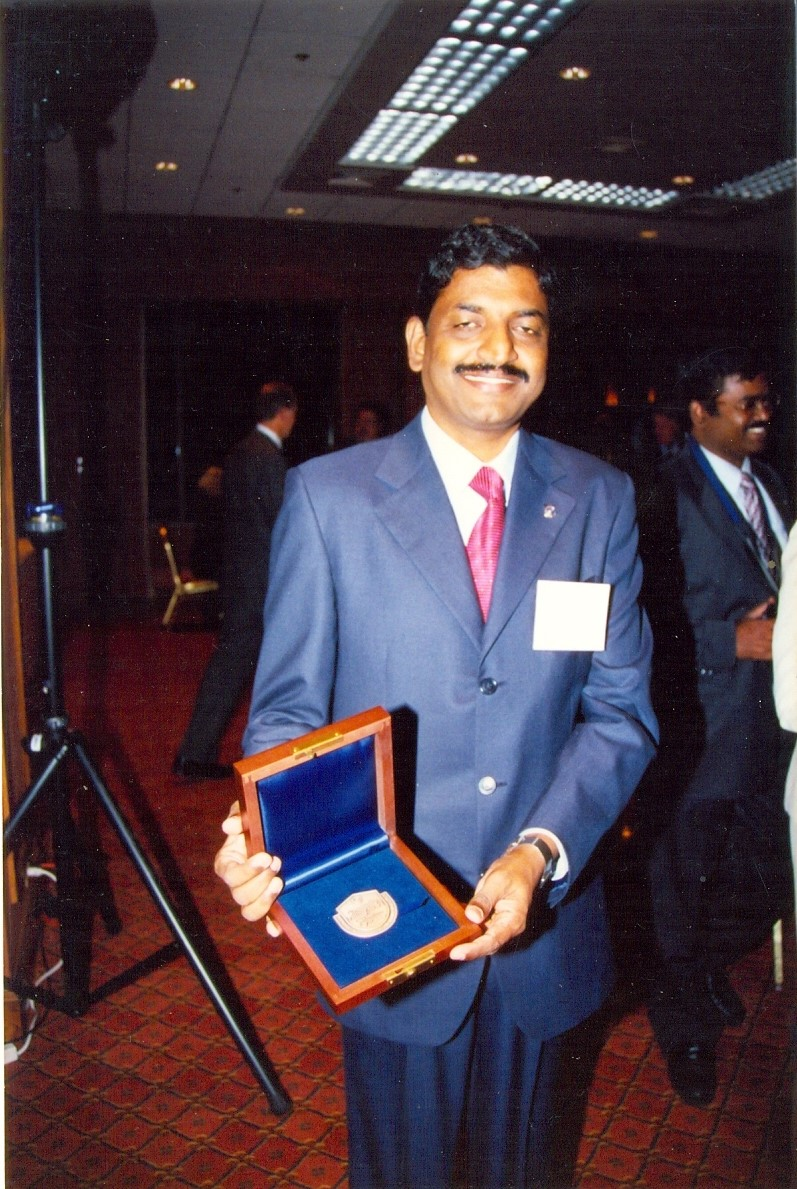
K. Radhakrishnan with his award for "Community Policing".

In the course of his duty as Superintendent of Police, Vellore District, Dr. K. Radhakrishnan was awarded the Gandhi Adigal Police Medal for eradication of illicit liquor menace in his region. Assuming role as the Commissioner of Police of Coimbatore City in the immediate aftermath of the Serial Blasts of 1998 and in partnership with civil society, Radhakrishnan employed the philosophy of 'Community Policing', which enlisted the civil society's participation to fight communalism. This resulted in him being conferred with the 'Community Policing Award' in 2002 by the International Association of Chiefs of Police (IACP), Alexandria, VA, United States. Later on he developed a model on 'Communal Relations Management' which won him the 'Queen's Award for Innovation in Police Training and Development' in 2004. During his stint as the Deputy Inspector General of Police in the Police Training College Chennai, Radhakrishnan worked on a project report that detailed into enhancing the roles of the women police officers, which won him recognition by the Queen's Award Panel once again. He was awarded the 'Queen's Award for Innovation in Police Training and Development' in 2002. This project was then successfully implemented in the Police Training College, Chennai.

He was awarded the President's Police Medal in 1999 for "Distinguished Service" during his stint as the Commissioner of Police in Coimbatore, for his efforts towards restoring peace and harmony in the city that was left dilapidated post the blasts.

== Personal life ==
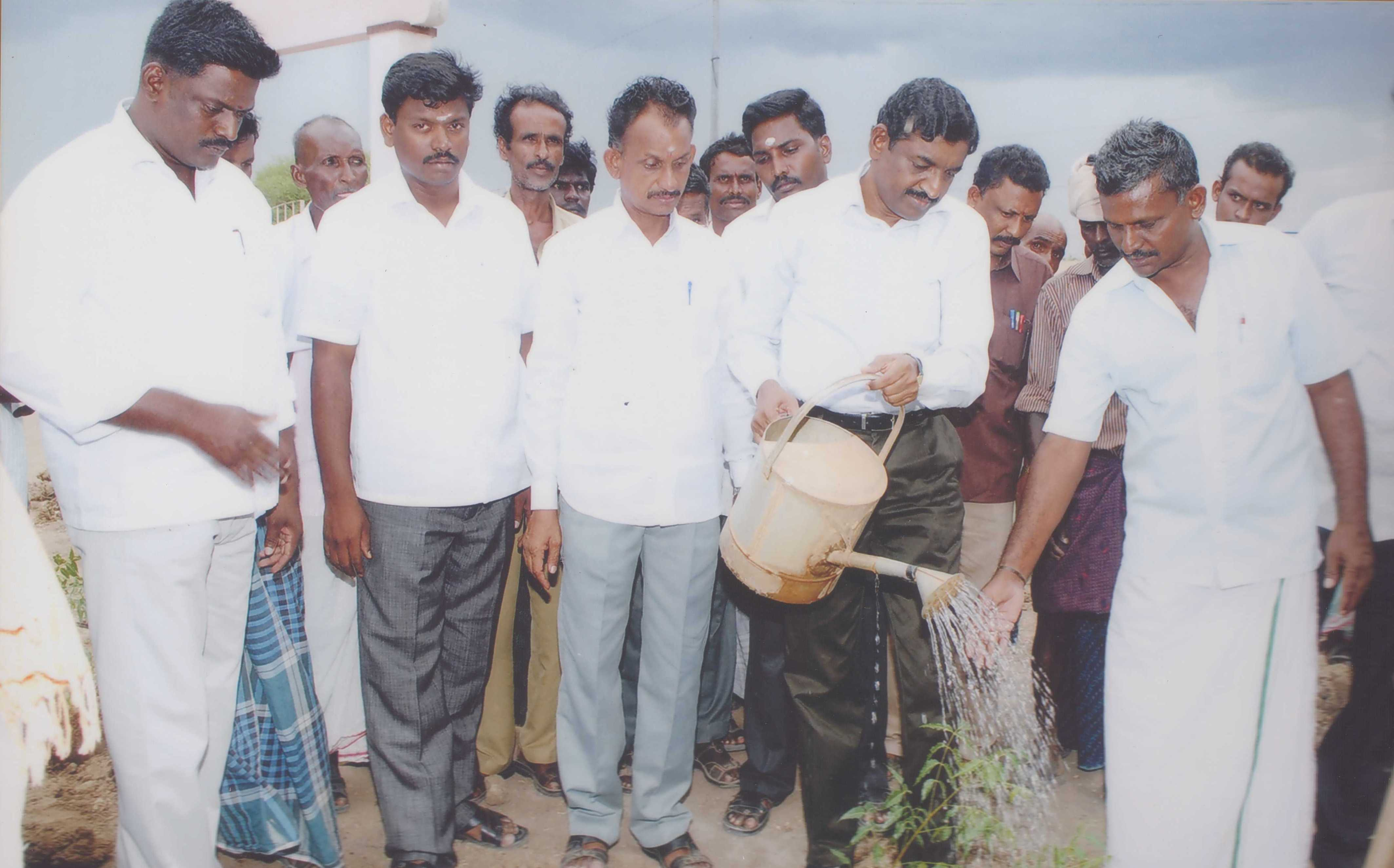
K. Radhakrishnan during the inauguration of his new Higher Secondary School in Srivilliputthur.

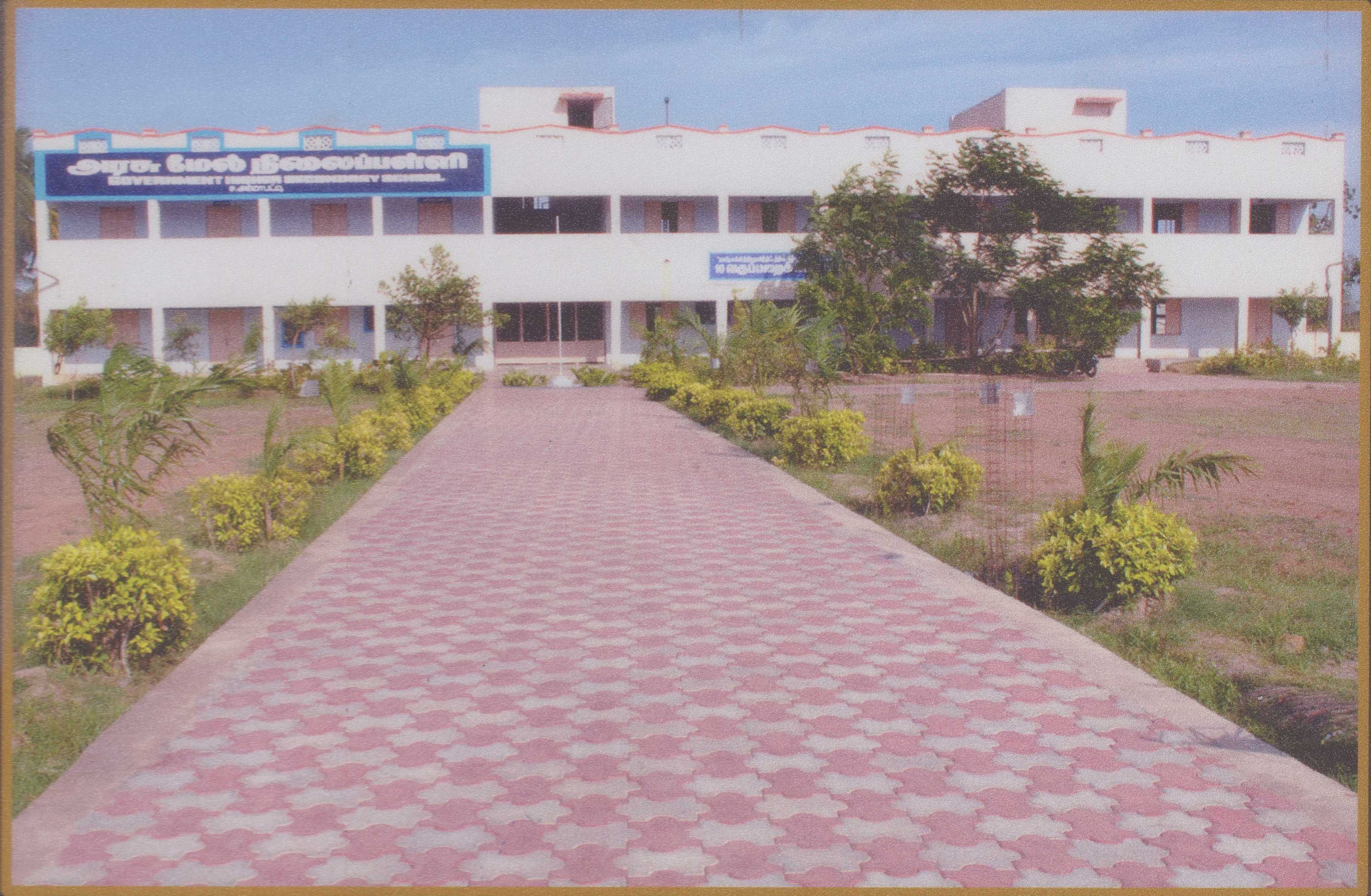
The new Higher Secondary School in Srivilliputthur that K. Radhakrishnan built in his hometown.

In his personal life, Radhakrishnan enjoys reading, Tamil literature, and academics. Motivated by challenges in his early years, he converted his primary school into a full-fledged Higher Secondary School that provides free education to the impoverished children in the locality. He acted as a resource person, delivering lectures for the National Police Academy, Tamil Nadu Police Training College, Madras University, Anna University, Annamalai University and Indian Bank Management Academy for Growth & Excellence. He also acts as a consultant for the Bureau of Police Research and Development, New Delhi on Community Policing.
