= Civil Supplies Department =

Type of Indian state ministry

Civil Supplies Departments are government departments in the centre and states of India which governs the supply of commodities in the nation and the respective states.

1. Civil Supplies Department of Tamil Nadu
2. Civil Supplies Department of Kerala
3. Andhra Pradesh State Civil Supplies Corporation Limited
