= Puthiya Thalaimurai =

Tamil magazine from Chennai, India

- Categories: General interest
- Frequency: Weekly
- Founder: P. Sathyanarayanan
- First issue: October 2009
- Company: Puthiya Thalaimurai
- Country: India
- Language: Tamil
- Website: Puthiya Thalaimurai

Puthiya Thalaimurai is a Tamil magazine published from Chennai, India by New Generation Media. The group also has an English website, The Federal, a digital platform disseminating news, analysis and commentary. It seeks to look at India from the perspective of the states.

== History and profile ==
Puthiya Thalaimurai was first published in October 2009. The magazine is published on a weekly basis. It mostly publishes articles about education and Tamil Nadu politics.

The magazine awards the best performers in the teaching profession in Tamil Nadu with annual Asiriyar Awards since 2015. The awards are given to teachers who have shown excellence in the categories such as scientific awareness, rural service, girls' education, tribal development, innovation, motivation, language skill development and creativity.

The English news website The Federal was launched as a state-focused website talking about the issues related to the federal structure of the government. Editions focused on Telangana and Karnataka were also launched as of April 2024.

== Controversies ==
=== Bomb attack on Puthiya Thalaimurai office ===
On 8 March 2015, several protesters attacked a video journalist and broke his equipment outside the Puthiya Thalaimurai office. The protests reportedly started after promos of a show about Mangalsutra was aired on 11 March 2015. The protesters claimed it hurt their religious sentiments. 10 members of the Hindu Munnani outfit were arrested in connection with the incident. Tamilisai Soundararajan the then BJP state president visited the protesters in jail and pledged them her support.

On 12 March 2015, at about 3:00 a.m., four men came on motorcycles and threw two crude bombs stuffed in tiffin boxes into the Puthiya Thalaimurai office. The event was captured on CCTV cameras. No one was said to be injured in the attack. Later the ex-youth president of the right-wing outfit Hindu Makkal Katchi and the current president of Hindu Ilaignar Sena, Pandian surrendered at the court of Madurai. Pandian has been named in a few cases together with an attack on a sub-inspector in Madurai.
