= Environmental Protection Training and Research Institute =

Indian research institute

Environmental Protection Training and Research Institute known as EPTRI is a research institute located in Hyderabad, India. The institute provides training, consultancy, applied research services and extends advocacy in the area of environment protection.

== See also ==
- Manu Needhi Consumer and Environmental Protection Centre
