= Kerala Civil Supplies & Consumer Affairs Department =

Field department of the Government of Kerala

- പൊതു വിതരണ, ഉപഭോക്തൃകാര്യ വകുപ്പ്, കേരള സർക്കാർ

Field department overview
- Jurisdiction: Government of Kerala
- Headquarters: Thiruvananthapuram, Kerala, India
- Minister responsible: Shri.Anoop Jacob, Minister for Food, Civil Supplies, Consumer Affairs and Legal Metrology
- Field department executive: Smt.Hima K IAS, Commissioner of Civil Supplies & Consumer Affairs
- Parent department: Department of Food, Civil Supplies & Consumer Affairs

Kerala Civil Supplies & Consumer Affairs Department is the field department of the Government of Kerala responsible for implementing the state's Public Distribution System (PDS), regulating the distribution of essential commodities, enforcing market discipline, and promoting consumer awareness and consumer protection. It functions under the Department of Food, Civil Supplies & Consumer Affairs of the Government Secretariat.

== History ==
The Public Distribution System in Kerala was introduced on 1 July 1965 to ensure the equitable distribution of food grains in a state with a chronic deficit in food production. The Civil Supplies Department subsequently became the principal agency responsible for administering the rationing system. During the 1960s and 1970s, Kerala's universal rationing system received recognition for its administrative performance.

To strengthen consumer protection, the Government of Kerala later established a Consumer Affairs wing in the Secretariat and a Consumer Affairs Cell within the Commissionerate of Civil Supplies.

== Organisation ==
The department is headed by the Commissioner of Civil Supplies & Consumer Affairs, who serves as the principal executive officer and advises the minister on matters relating to public distribution and consumer affairs. The Director of Civil Supplies is the administrative head responsible for exercising statutory powers under the Kerala Rationing Order, 1966, the Public Distribution System (Control) Order, 2001, and related control orders issued under the Essential Commodities Act, 1955.

The department functions through:

- Commissionerate of Civil Supplies
- District Supply Offices
- Taluk Supply Offices
- City Rationing Offices
- Consumer Affairs Cell
- Vigilance and Enforcement Wing

== Functions ==
The department's principal responsibilities include:

- Implementation of the Public Distribution System.
- Distribution of food grains and other essential commodities under the National Food Security Act, 2013.
- Issue, renewal and management of ration cards.
- Licensing and supervision of Authorised Ration Dealers.
- Enforcement against hoarding, black marketing and diversion of essential commodities.
- Monitoring market prices and availability of notified commodities.
- Consumer education and awareness programmes.
- Administration of statutory orders relating to rationing and essential commodities.

== Public Distribution System ==
The department administers one of India's largest state public distribution networks through more than 14,000 authorised ration shops across Kerala. It coordinates the procurement, allocation and distribution of food grains supplied by the Government of India and monitors their delivery to eligible beneficiaries under the National Food Security Act.

In recent years the department has introduced online ration card services, electronic point-of-sale devices in ration shops and other digital initiatives to improve transparency and service delivery.

== Consumer affairs ==
The Consumer Affairs Cell undertakes programmes to promote consumer awareness, disseminate information on consumer rights, coordinate observance of National Consumer Day and support implementation of the Consumer Protection Act, 2019.

== Legal framework ==
The department administers or implements provisions of:

- Essential Commodities Act, 1955
- National Food Security Act, 2013
- Consumer Protection Act, 2019
- Kerala Rationing Order, 1966
- Public Distribution System (Control) Order, 2001

== See also ==
- Department of Co-operation, Food and Consumer Protection (Tamil Nadu)
- Department of Food, Civil Supplies & Consumer Affairs
- Public Distribution System (India)
- National Food Security Act, 2013
- Government of Kerala
