= 1990 Madras riots =

Riots and civil disorder in Madras

During the 1990 Madras riots, violence broke out between Muslims and Hindus during a Hindu religious procession near a Mosque in September 1997 in Triplicane, Tamil Nadu. Three Muslims were reported to be killed in the violence. Unofficial reports place the death toll to five to six. Muslim owned stores were burned down and looted.

== Background ==
Triplicane is a neighbourhood in Madras(present day Chennai) where temples and mosques coexisted amicably and Hindu and Muslim residents have coexisted for many years. Triplicane has a sizable Muslim population. Tamil Nadu witnessed large-scale communal violence in Nagore, Dindugul, Ambur in the months preceding the violence.

=== Religious procession ===
On 2 September, a week before Ganesh Chaturthi, the Vinayaka Chathurthi Festival Committee organised a ritual parade of the Vinayaka idols through the streets of Triplicane before being immersed in the sea. The parade had been heavily publicized with posters placed conspicuously in and around Triplicane and around the city. The most prominent person in the posters was the leader of Hindu Munnani, Rama Gopalan. Rama Gopalan was the lead speaker at the rally.

A week before the parade, an organisation named Hindu Sangam pasted posters calling for the prime minister's declaration of a national holiday on the birthday of Muhammad to be repealed. The Hindu Munnani also resented this move by the government.

== Riots ==
four and four eight, chop the Muslim on sight

— Slogan from the procession,

On 2 September, the parade arrived at a busy intersection and came to a standstill in front of the Ice house mosque. Marwari youth were present in large numbers and reportedly funded the parade. Fire-crackers were exploded, Nadaswaram and drums were played with some playing the nadaswaram at high pitch. The processionists shouted anti-Muslim slogans. The Hindu Sangham distributed leaflets that denounced Muhammad during the parade. The Muslims protested the disruption of their prayers at prayer time in the mosque and gathered outside their mosque. Fire crackers were reportedly thrown into the mosque by the processionists. Newspapers reported that a slipper was thrown from inside the mosque at the procession. The Muslims and the processionists attacked each other. The police intervened and allowed the parade to the sea, and the situation was soon resolved.

A section of the processionists returned to the same area and the clashes between both the communities continued. The police opened fire without ample warning which killed a Muslim youngster. Violence against Muslim properties and houses were continued by youth who were specifically recruited for the violence from the slums close by. The next day, hired criminals entered inside a mosque and stabbed a Muslim. Most shops were shut and people rarely came out of their homes.

== Casualties and damages ==
Three Muslims were reported to the killed in the riots. Unofficial reports placed the number to five or six. Many large Muslim-owned stores were robbed and torched.

== Aftermath ==
In 2000, Rama Gopalan, the state president of the Hindu Munnani, again attempted to conduct the parade through the Ice House mosque rather than following the police-ordered diversion. He and his supporters were detained.
