= Department of Co-operation, Food and Consumer Protection (Tamil Nadu) =

Government Department of Tamil Nadu, India

Agency overview
- Jurisdiction: Tamil Nadu
- Headquarters: Chennai
- Ministers responsible: P. Venkataramanan, Minister for Food and Consumer Protection Department; V. Gandhiraj, Minister for Co-operation Department
- Agency executive: K. Gopal, IAS, Principal Secretary to Government
- Parent agency: Government of Tamil Nadu
- Website: Co-operation, Food and Consumer Protection Department

The Department of Co-operation, Food and Consumer Protection of state of Tamil Nadu is one of the departments of Government of Tamil Nadu.

== Co-operation ==
The objective of the department of co-operation is to facilitate agricultural production through co-operatives by providing loans, supplying agricultural inputs such as fertilizers and insecticides at subsidized prices and enable storage, distribution and marketing of farm produce. The department runs multiple co-operative federations and unions to enable its various functions including the Tamil Nadu Cooperative Marketing Federation (TANFED), Tamil Nadu Consumers Cooperative Federation (TNCCF) and Tamil Nadu Cooperative Union (TNCU). The department runs financial institutions including the Tamil Nadu State Apex Co-operative Bank for facilitation of financial and banking services.

== Food and consumer protection ==
The food and consumer protection department is responsible for ensuring adequate availability of essential commodities at standard quality and affordable price to the public. Public Distribution System functions under The Tamil Nadu Civil Supplies Corporation (TNCSC) of the department and is involved in the distribution of commodities through fair price ration shops across the state. Tamil Nadu Warehousing Corporation (TNWC), established in 1958, facilitates maintenance of warehousing facilities for food produce.

== See also ==
- Civil Supplies Department
- Government of Tamil Nadu
- Manu Needhi Consumer and Environmental Protection Centre
- Ministry of Consumer Affairs, Food and Public Distribution (India)
- Tamil Nadu Government's Departments
