= Tamil Nadu Civil Supplies Corporation =

Government organization in India

- Native name: தமிழ்நாடு நுகர்பொருள் வாணிபக் கழகம்
- Company type: Government of Tamil Nadu
- Industry: Food Grains, Commodity Distribution
- Founded: 1972
- Founder: M Karunanidhi
- Headquarters: Chennai, Tamil Nadu, India
- Area served: Tamil Nadu, India
- Key people: M.SUDHA DEVI, I.A.S Managing Director, Tamil Nadu Civil Supplies Corporation (Aug2017 to Present)
- Owner: Government of Tamil Nadu
- Parent: Department of Co-operation, Food and Consumer Protection (Tamil Nadu)

The Tamil Nadu Civil Supplies Corporation (Tamil: தமிழ்நாடு நுகர்பொருள் வாணிபக் கழகம் (வரையறுக்கப்பட்டது)) is governed by Government of Tamil Nadu was registered under the Companies Act, 1956. It is responsible for providing food grains, commodities for the people under Public Distribution System through Ration shops. It also provides kerosene at very low cost. Some of the commodities are Rice, Wheat, Sugar, Cooking Oil, Rava etc.,

== TNCSC objectives ==
- Procure the products
- Store the products by own or Tamil Nadu Warehousing Corporation Warehousing Godowns
- Supply the products by own or through Tamil Nadu Consumers Cooperative Federation Limited (TNCCF) Stores

== TNCSC operation ==
- Direct Purchase Centre (DPC): Paddy procurement from farmers
- Modern Rice Mills (MRM) (22 mills across Tamil Nadu) – Rice hulling are operating at these mills
- Corporation Retail Stores(CRS): Tamil Nadu Government Public Distribution System Stores (TN PDS Store) [Tamil Nadu Civil Supplies Corporation runs 1162 TN PDS Stores in Tamil Nadu as per Tamil Nadu Government Order]
- Fuel Retail Outlet [Petrol / Diesel Retail: operating 3 Indian Oil Corporation Petrol / Diesel Bunks each one at Mandarakuppam (Cuddalore District), Tirupathur (Vellore District) and Pattukkottai (Thanjavur District)] [LPG Retail Outlets: operating 5 outlets each one at Arani (Thiruvanamalai District), Thiruchi, Udagamandalam and Mandapam & Rameshwaram (Ramanathapuram District)]
- Kerosene Retail Outlet (KRO): operating 30 kerosene retail outlets across Tamil Nadu
- Amudham Departmental Stores (ADS) [operating 27 Amudham Departmental Stores (ADS) across Tamil Nadu; 22 in Chennai District and 5 in Cuddalore District]
- Warehousing Godown (WHG) [operating 17 own Warehousing Godowns]

== Ration card ==
Ration card is issued by Tamil Nadu Civil Supplies Corporation to family residing in Tamil Nadu. It consists of Head of family Photograph with all the family members name, age, sex, No. of LPG connections printed on the backside of the card with full residential address of family. The card is issued for every five years, each years are tabulated to every month to get the commodities from ration shop. It is used as important address proof for all government applications.
