= Andhra Pradesh State Civil Supplies Corporation Limited =

State government agency in Andhra Pradesh, India

Public Sector Undertaking overview
- Formed: 1974
- Type: Civil supplies
- Jurisdiction: Andhra Pradesh, India
- Headquarters: Kanuru, Vijayawada, Andhra Pradesh, India
- Employees: est. 500-1000
- Public Sector Undertaking executives: Kona Sasidhar, Chairman; A. Surya Kumari, Vice chairman & Managing director
- Parent department: Department of Civil Supplies, Government of Andhra Pradesh
- Website: www.apscscl.in

The Andhra Pradesh State Civil Supplies Corporation is a state government agency to promote, distribute and sale of food items and other commodities, ensure food quality control in Andhra Pradesh, India.

== History ==
The corporation was established in the year 1974, as a limited company under the Companies Act 1956. The Share capital of the company is fully contributed by the Government of Andhra Pradesh.

== Organisation ==
The company is headed by a chairman including 2-8 board of directors. The chairman is appointed by the Government of Andhra Pradesh. The organisation undertakes the public distribution system and market intervention as a measure for controlling prices and also minimum support price as per the orders issued by the Government of Andhra Pradesh.

The organisation is having 439 Mandal level stock points in the state for the storage of stocks.
