= 1993 bombing of RSS office in Chennai =

Coordinates: 13.007°N 0.203°E

Chennai RSS office bombing
- Location: Chennai, Tamil Nadu
- Date: 8 August 1993
- Deaths: 11
- Injuries: 7

1993 bombing of RSS office in Chennai refers to the bombing of a head office of the Rashtriya Swayamsevak Sangh in Chennai in Tamil Nadu on 8 August 1993.

== Trial and convictions ==
A special Central Bureau of Investigation (CBI) court tried eighteen of the accused under the now-defunct Terrorist and Disruptive Activities (Prevention) Act. In 2007, the court convicted eleven people, sentencing three to life imprisonment; however, four were acquitted for lack of evidence, among them S. A. Basha, the founder of Al Ummah. The judge stated, "There is no evidence what-so-ever to prove that all the accused here-in and the organisations were involved in the said conspiracy, particularly in the demolition of the RSS office", referring to organisations such as Al Ummah, the Jihad Committee, and the Islamic Peace Organisation.

In 2017, CBI announced a reward of Rs.10 lakh for information related to Mushtaq Ahmed, one of the main individuals accused in the bombing. Ahmed was later arrested in January 2018.
