= Hindu Makkal Katchi =

Hindu Makkal Katchi Indu Makkal Katchi (IMK)
- Abbreviation: HMK or IMK
- President: Arjun Sampath
- Founder: S. V. Sridhar
- Founded: 1993
- Split from: Hindu Munnani
- Headquarters: Coimbatore, Tamil Nadu, India
- Ideology: Hindutva
- Political position: Right-wing

Hindu Makkal Katchi (HMK or IMK; also referred to as Indu Makkal Katchi; lit. 'Hindu People's Party') is a right-wing Hindutva political party in the Indian state of Tamil Nadu.

Founded in 1993, it was formed by members of the Hindu Munnani, a Hindutva militant organisation, under the guidance of the Rashtriya Swayamsevak Sangh (RSS), a right-wing Hindutva paramilitary organisation. It acts as a front for its political activities in Tamil Nadu. Since its inception, the party has functioned in alignment with the objectives of the RSS and its affiliated organisations, collectively referred to as the Sangh Parivar.

== Formation ==
Hindu Munnani, the parent organisation of the HMK, was established in 1980 by Rama Gopalan, a member of the RSS, as a political wing of the RSS in Tamil Nadu. Since its formation, the Hindu Munnani has functioned as a platform for the RSS the Sangh Parivar.

The Hindu Munnani employed a Hindu communal identity as a means of political mobilisation. During the early 1990s, the state government, led by J. Jayalalithaa under the All India Anna Dravida Munnetra Kazhagam (AIADMK), exhibited inclinations towards Hindutva, in part, as a reaction to the perceived vote-bank politics of the Dravida Munnetra Kazhagam (DMK). in organizing Vinayaka Chathurthi processions in major cities of Tamil Nadu. The endorsement and encouragement of such activities strengthened the relationship between the state government and Gopalan, resulting in his political alignment with Jayalalithaa. This proximity to the ruling dispensation contributed to internal dissent within the Hindu Munnani, leading to a schism in 1993. A faction, led by S. V. Sridhar, seceded to establish a separate organisation named the Hindu Makkal Katchi. Both the Hindu Munnani and Hindu Makkal Katchi have frequently employed inflammatory and abusive language directed at the Muslim community. Their provocative discourse, which often included denunciations of Islam and the Prophet Muhammad, significantly heightened communal tensions in the region. These developments played a key role in catalysing the formation of the Muslim organisation Al Ummah, as a counter-response to the rise in Islamophobia.

The activities of the RSS, the Hindu Munnani and the HMK continued uninterrupted under Jayalalithaa. The Bhartiya Janata Party's (BJP) alliance with AIADMK led to further rise in Hindutva in the region. These parties have, at times, used religious festivals to consolidate their support bases, which has sometimes resulted in religious riots.

== Structure ==
Arjun Sampath is the president of the party. Arjun Sampath's son Omkar Balaji is the party's youth wing leader.

== History ==
Owing to a series of extremist activities, the party frequently found itself in conflict with the law. In 1997, its leader, Arjun Sampath, was arrested on charges of attempted murder of MLA C. T. Dhandapani and was jailed at the Vellore Central Prison.

In 2006, five party activists were arrested for damaging a statue of Periyar, an anti-caste and feminist activist, who organised the Self-Respect Movement and who is considered the architect of Dravidian politics.

In 2008 and 2009, several party members were detained by the police, in an effort to prevent them from staging Hindu nationalist demonstrations on the island of Kachchatheevu, which belongs to Sri Lanka.

In 2009, some Tamil fishermen were arrested by the Sri Lankan Navy. In response, HMK members and supporters started pressuring the Indian government to rescue them from Sri Lanka. When Union Home Minister P. Chidambaram visited Tamil Nadu, HMK supporters showed black flag as a form of protest. 19 supporters were thus arrested and removed from park area by the police.

The party has also repeatedly filed charges against famous women. It pressed charges against the movie stars Khushbu Sundar, Shriya Saran, and Mallika Sherawat, for "indecent dressing" and for supposedly "offending Hindu values." Party members have also harassed women visiting pubs and young couples out on Valentine's Day.

In November 2019, Hindu Makkal Katchi leader Arjun Sampath was detained after he draped a saffron shawl on a statue of Thiruvalluvar, in Pillayarpatti, Thanjavur, in a symbolic Hindu nationalist move.

In January 2018, a group threw molotov cocktails at the house of the HMK south zone organising president, named Balamurugan, before fleeing the scene. In September 2018, five individuals were arrested by the police, for supposedly plotting to murder HMK leader Sampath.

In February 2023, Manikandan, the south district deputy head of the HMK was killed by a gang in Madurai, Tamil Nadu. Police said that the accused escaped after committing the crime.

In May 2023, violence broke out between the members of the Hindu Makkal katchi and BJP members following a heated argument over the 100th episode of Prime Minister Narendra Modi's Mann Ki Baat. Members of the HMK and BJP attacked each other with iron rods and tore each other's clothes. Police confiscated weapons, wooden logs, and iron rods involved in the incident, arrested three individuals, and sent several others to the hospital.
