= Manu Needhi Consumer and Environmental Protection Centre =

Manu Needhi Consumer and Environmental Protection Centre is a non-profit organisation, registered under the Tamil Nadu Societies Registration Act, 1975. It was formed by then law students of Dr. Ambedkar Law College, Chennai, most of whom are now the practicing advocates in Madras High Court, Chennai.

== Executive members ==
There are seven executive members:

- A. Muniraja - president
- Akila Arunkumar- vice president
- S. Saravanan - general secretary
- P. Saravana Siva - joint secretary
- R. Senthil Kumar - treasurer
- M. Manikhandan - committee member
- Sindhuja Seenivasaga Perumal

== Consumer protection ==
Manu Needhi works to create awareness to the consumers about their rights by conducting periodical campaigns. Further, they provide free legal aid to the consumers to get their grievance redressed legally in consumer courts. They also file public interest litigation.

== Awareness campaigns ==
Personnel at the centre have organised awareness campaigns around issues that affect the public at large, including campaigns in remote villages and a mass voters' awareness rally.

== Articles and publications ==
The president and vice-president of the organization have been known to write articles related to consumer rights that have been published in newspapers and magazines of India, especially in Tamil Nadu.
