= 2013 Bangalore bombing =

Terrorist incident in India

- Location: Malleswaram, Bangalore, Karnataka, India
- Date: 17 April 2013 (GMT +5:30)
- Weapon: IED
- Deaths: None
- Injuries: 16
- Perpetrators: Syed Ali and Jahan Aamir

A bomb explosion known as the 2013 Bangalore bombing occurred on 17 April 2013 in Bangalore, India, at 10:30 (IST) near the Bharatiya Janata Party Karnataka New State Office Jagannath Bhawan, on Temple Street 11th Cross, Malleswaram.

At least 16 people were injured. The Ministry of Home Affairs (MHA) confirmed that the latest Bangalore blast was a terror attack. Syed Ali and Jahan Aamir were arrested by the Bangalore Police for the attack.

== Event description and timeline ==
(Timeline displayed in reverse chronological order) A motorcycle was parked in between two cars near the BJP Karnataka State Office Jagannath Bhawan. The blast ripped apart the motorcycle and gutted both cars. Windows of nearby houses and vehicles were also reported to have been shattered due to the shock-wave from the blast.

17 April 2013 at 3:00 pm – Security was stepped up in New Delhi in the wake of the Bangalore blast with special checking of inbound and outbound vehicles. Personnel were deployed across the national capital but police said there was no reason to panic. Vigilance was also stepped up at railway stations, airports, Metro stations, market places and other public places in the capital.

17 April 2013 – 2:45 pm – Eleven policemen were reportedly injured in the blast, sources said.

17 April 2013 – 2:30 pm – Union Home Minister Sushilkumar Shinde spoke on the Bangalore blast in Kolkata on Wednesday. He said he had already constituted a probe into the Bangalore blast.

17 April 2013 – 2:06 pm – An NSG team is set to leave for Bangalore.

17 April 2013 – 1:54 pm – Another blast was reported by the local media from Hebbal. Police, however, denied such reports.

17 April 2013 – 1:47 pm – NIA and sleuths were probing the blast site. Karnataka has been put on high alert.

17 April 2013 – 1:45 pm – Bangalore Police was alerted about possible disruptive activities a couple of days ago. On Tuesday, Bangalore hosted an IPL match and the security was expected to be high with elections around the corner.

17 April 2013 – 1:40 pm – BJP spokesperson Meenakshi Lekhi condemned the blast.

17 April 2013 – 1:38 pm – The Ind-Suzuki motorcycle in which the explosive (500 grams) was placed had a Tamil Nadu registration number and was parked there since yesterday, sources said. The explosion was carried out with a timer, it was learnt. The two-wheeler was a stolen one, reports said.

17 April 2013 – 1:36 pm – Senior BJP leader Venkaiah Naidu condemned the incident and hoped that the center and the government of Karnataka probed the incident in proper coordination. He said they would wait for the outcome of the probe.

17 April 2013 – 1:15 pm – Reports confirmed that IED was used to trigger the Malleshwaram blast in Bangalore on Wednesday morning. 1:10 pm – R Ashoka, Karnataka deputy chief minister and home minister said the BJP will not be deterred by such cowardly acts. He said it was clearly an act of terror.

17 April 2013 – 1:05 pm – A female victim admitted in the hospital said she fell down after hearing a massive explosion and seeing fire. "I don't remember anything after that," she said. Meanwhile, officials said none of the vehicles that were present at that Bangalore blast site had a LPG kit. Karnataka Police DGP Lalrokhuma Pachau said the motorcycle and a van were damaged the most in the blast.

17 April 2013 – 12:44 pm – Home Secretary RPN Singh appealed for peace and calm. Police said the nature of the injuries in the blast were not very serious and the injured were undergoing treatment at KC Hospital. Singh said the Karnataka Police will be given all possible help in probing the incident.

17 April 2013 – 12:33 pm – Police were suspecting whether the blast targeted at the BJP office. The entire area has been cordoned off. The toll of injured touches 16.

17 April 2013 – 12:23 pm – The injured in the blast included a CRPF jawan and an 18-year-old PU student who was on her way to the tutorial. They were being treated at KC Hospital in Malleshwaram. Two teenage girls were among the injured.

17 April 2013 – 12:13 pm – An NIA team was rushed to the blast spot. Although initially it was said that the NIA's assistance would not be required to probe the case. A forensic team had also reached the spot to probe the incident. The bomb squad was also expected to arrive at the spot.

17 April 2013 – 12:09 pm – BJP spokesperson Ashwatnarayana said they had come out in the street after hearing a huge blast. "We had first thought it to be a transformer blast," he said. "Thanks to good old trees on Bevinamarada Raste the damage is minimal," the BJP man told OneIndia News. If the blast near BJP's office in Banglore is a terror attack, it will certainly help the BJP politically on the eve of election. BJP leader Balbir Punj had said earlier that he hoped that it was not a terror attack.

17 April 2013 – 11:45 am – Commissioner of Police Raghavendra Auradkar said the explosion was caused by a motorcycle bomb. The police said the explosives were placed on the motorcycle. The police, however, said there was no need to seek NIA help in the probe at the moment.

17 April 2013 – 11:30 am – Karnataka Chief Minister Jagadish Shettar said it was too early to make any statement on whether it was a terror attack. He said the officials were investigating it thoroughly.

== Investigation ==
According to police chief of Karnataka, Lalrokhuma Pachau, the material that was used for explosion was ammonium nitrate which is easily available in the market and frequently used by terrorist groups The motorbike used for the purpose was reported to have been stolen from Hyderabad while the number plate bearing Tamil Nadu registration number TN22R3769 was also recovered from the spot.

A team from the National Investigation Agency has arrived from Delhi to investigate into the matter. A team of the National Security Guard has also left for Bangalore to aid the police. No group has claimed responsibility for the bombings.

On Friday, 21 April 2023, a special court in Bengaluru convicted two Tamil Nadu-based men, part of terror organisation, Al-Umma, for their role in an explosion outside a BJP office in the city in 2013.

== Victims ==
16 people, 8 policemen and 8 civilians, are reported to have been injured in the blast. All the victims were rushed to KC General Hospital. None of the victim suffered life-threatening injuries.

== See also ==
- 2010 Bangalore stadium bombing
