= Hindu Munnani =

Indian Hindutva militant organisation

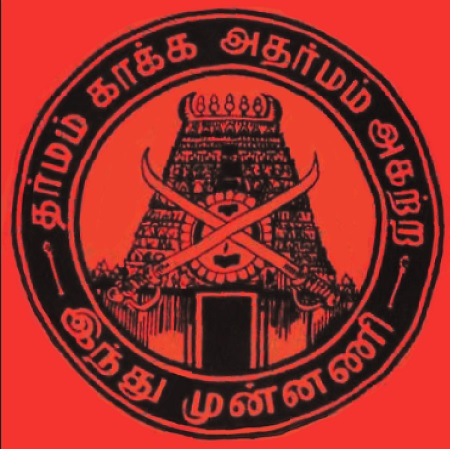
- Logo of the organisation.
- Founder: Ramagopalan
- Founded: c. 1980
- Country: India
- Ideology: Hindutva
- Status: Active
- Part of: Sangh Parivar
- Website: hindumunnani.org

Hindu Munnani is a right-wing Hindutva militant organisation based in the Indian state of Tamil Nadu. Hindu Munnani was set up by Rashtriya Swayamsevak Sangh (RSS), a right-wing Hindutva paramilitary organisation. The organisation was founded in 1980 by Ramagopalan, a member of RSS and since its formation served as the platform for RSS and its subsidiaries known as the Sangh Parivar in the region.

The organisation promoted a Hindu identity and used it as a political mobilisation strategy. The AIADMK government in the 1990s was in alliance with the Hindutva aligned Bharatiya Janata Party which enabled Hindu Munnani in organizing Vinayaka Chathurthi processions in major cities of Tamil Nadu. The state government's support of Rama Gopalan's activity made him a follower of Jayalalitha. Due to the proximity, a faction of the group broke away and found another group named Hindu Makkal Katchi in 1993. The militants of the Hindu Munnani used vituperative and abusive language against the Muslims. The provocative speeches against Islam and Muhammad polarized the social atmosphere of the region. Their anti-Muslim speeches and activities led to formation of radical muslim terrorist organisation Al Umma.

The activities of R.S.S., Hindu Munnani and Hindu Makkal Katchi continued uninterrupted under Jayalalitha. The BJP alliance with AIADMK led to further spread of RSS ideology in Tamil Nadu. These organisations used religious festivals to combine their strength and caused riots.

== Activities ==
The Hindu Munnani first gained public awareness in 1982 when it began to incite the Hindu population of Ramanathapuram district against the Meenakshipuram conversions by Ishaatul Islam Sabha of South India.

However, the most remarkable achievement of the Hindu Munnani was the organisation of Vinayaka Chathurthi processions in Tamil Nadu. On 16 May 2006, the Hindu Munnani organised the Silver Jubilee celebrations of the installation of the shivalinga in the Jalakanteswarar temple in Vellore.

The Vinayaga Chathurthi celebrations organised by the Hindu Munnani were often accompanied by sporadic incidents of communal violence. In 1993, there were bomb attacks made on the R.S.S. state headquarters at Chintadripet, Chennai. Islamic organisations were found guilty for the blasts and a crackdown was launched on extremist Islamic organisations.

During the visit of Bharatiya Janata Party (BJP) leader L. K. Advani and Indian Prime Minister Atal Bihari Vajpayee to Coimbatore in 1998, a series of thirteen blasts rocked the city, killing over fifty-eight people. The Coimbatore bombings were considered a response to the 1997 Coimbatore riots.

In 2007, there were clashes between the Hindu Munnani and the Dravida Munnetra Kazhagam (DMK) over the remarks made by BJP leader Vedanti on DMK President and Chief Minister Karunanidhi. DMK cadres attacked the Hindu Munnani state headquarters in Chennai on motorbikes.

In September 2017, six members of Hindu Munnani were arrested in connection with the murder of CPI member K. Kanagaraj in Virudhunagar district, Tamil Nadu.

In March 2020, Hindu Munnani attacked a mosque in Coimbatore during a communal tension.

== Attacks against Hindu Munnani ==
In 1981, Hindu Munnani leader, Thirukovilur Sundaram, was murdered at R. S. Puram in Coimbatore by Islamic fundamentalists.

S Vellaiappan, a senior leader of Hindu Munnani in Vellore, was murdered by a gang of 8 people when he was headed towards Ramakrishna Math on his motorbike in July 2013.

K. P. S. Suresh Kumar: He was the president of the Hindu Munnani for Thiruvallur East district. He was originally from Kanyakumari. He was murdered by people from Al Ummah, a banned Islamic terrorist organisation, in June 2014. Three members were detained by the police in August 2014.

Jeevaraj: He was Hindu Munnani's Tirunelveli town secretary. He was murdered by his wife due to alleged illicit, adulterous relationship with other girl in July 2014.

C Sasikumar: A member in Coimbatore. A gang of two members from Popular Front of India (PFI), a banned Muslim organization, chased him on motorcycles and attacked him with sickles. He suffered injuries and died in Coimbatore Medical College and Hospital (CMCH).

== See also ==
- P. Thanulinga Nadar
