= Al Ummah =

Islamic terrorist organisation

Al Ummah (English: The Nation) is an Islamic terrorist organisation mainly based in India, in the state of Tamil Nadu. It was banned by the Government of Tamil Nadu for perpetrating the 1998 Coimbatore bombings.

== History ==
On 8 August 1993, a bomb attack took place at a Rashtriya Swayamsevak Sangh (RSS) building in Chennai. The Central Bureau of Investigation (CBI) arrested S. A. Basha on 16 November 1993, in connection with the bombing. Following his arrest, communal riots broke out in Coimbatore, resulting in the registration of 21 criminal cases.

Subsequent police investigations reportedly led to the seizure of weapons and explosive materials, including gelatine sticks and approximately 44 kilograms of explosives.

Al Ummah was founded by Syed Ahmed Basha in Coimbatore, Tamil Nadu in 1993, . It came under the spotlight after the 1993 bomb blast near an RSS office in Chennai which caused the deaths of 11 people. In 1995, the organisation was involved with throwing home-made bombs at Mani Ratnam's house for portraying romance of a Hindu man with a Muslim woman in his film Bombay. Basha and others were arrested under Terrorist and Disruptive Activities (Prevention) Act but they were released in 1997. In 1998, Al Ummah was planning to assassinate Bharatiya Janata Party leader L. K. Advani during the election campaign in Coimbatore. Advani, however, eventually escaped due to a delay in his flight. The bomb blasts in 18 places, resulted in 58 deaths. In 2013, Al Ummah also was involved in the bomb blast in Bangalore.
