= List of pharmaceutical companies =

This listing is limited to those independent companies and subsidiaries notable enough to have their own articles in Wikipedia. Both going concerns and defunct firms are included, as well as firms that were part of the pharmaceutical industry at some time in their existence, provided they were engaged in the production of human (as opposed to veterinary) therapeutics. Included here are companies engaged not only in pharmaceutical development, but also supply chain management and device development, including compounding pharmacies.

Firms with no marketed products but which are working on pharmaceutical development as well as mature firms with a post-marketed portfolios have been included here.

Types of firms not included here include

- Retail pharmacies (pharmacy retailers)
- Intellectual property holding firms
- Firms specializing in the collection, fractionation and distribution of human blood
- Medical device manufacturers where the device is not related to pharmaceutical administration, including diagnostics only firms
- Ayurvedic, homeopathic, traditional Chinese medicinal, herbal supplement aka unani, and firms only involved in cannabis-product manufacturers
- Contract Research (CRO), Contract Manufacturing (CRM) and Contract Development and Manufacturing Organizations (CDMO)
- Active Pharmaceutical Ingredient (API) manufacturers which are not involved in drug development itself

Entry titles have been shortened in a number of cases, so that if the article title of a company is "XYZ Pharma", for instance, the entry will appear here as "XYZ"; likewise for "XYZ Biotech", "XYZ Therapeutics" and related.

Companies which existed as a joint venture for their entire existence are indicated by a super-script "JV", as in Perseid^{JV}.

== Alphabetical listing—active firms ==
=== #—A ===
- A. Nattermann (subsidiary of Sanofi; 1906– )
- AAH (1970s– )
- Abbott (1888– )^{public}
- AbbVie (2013– )^{public}
- Abiomed (subsidiary of J&J; 1981– )^{public}
- Abivax (2013– )^{public}
- Ablynx (subsidiary of Sanofi; 2001– )
- Acadia (1993– )^{public}
- Acceleron (2003– )^{public}
- ACG Group (1961– )
- ACI Limited (conglomerate which includes a pharmaceutical subsidiary; 1973– )^{public}
- Acme Laboratories (1954– )^{public}
- Acorda (1995– )^{public}
- ACT (2008– )^{private}
- Actelion (subsidiary of J&J; 1997– )
- Acura (1935– )^{public}
- Adcock Ingram (1890– )^{public}
- Advanced Accelerator Applications (2002– )
- Advanz (1963– )^{public}
- Agios (2008– )^{public}
- AIM ImmunoTech (1990– )^{public}
- Ajanta (1973– )^{public}
- Akbarieh (1890– )
- Alcon (2019– )^{public}
- Alembic (1907– )^{public}
- Alexion (subsidiary of AstraZeneca; 1992– )^{public}
- Algeta (1997– )^{private}
- ALK-Abelló (1923– )^{public}
- Alkaloid (conglomerate which includes a pharmaceutical subsidiary; 1936– )^{private}
- Alkem (1973– )^{public}
- Alkermes (1987– )^{public}
- Allergan (1948– )
- Almirall (1943– )
- Alnylam (2002– )^{public}
- Alphapharm (subsidiary of Mylan, 1982– )
- Altana (chemical company that once had a pharmaceuticals division; ????–2006)^{private}
- Alvogen (2009– )^{private}
- Alzheon (2013– )^{private}
- AMAG (1981– )^{public}
- Ameridose (2006– )
- Amgen (1980– )^{public}
- Amneal (2002– )^{public}
- Amphastar (2004– )^{public}
- Amrutanjan Healthcare (1893– )^{public}
- Angelini (1919– )^{private}
- Angiotech (1992– )^{public}
- Annexin (????– )^{private}
- Anthera (2004– )^{public}
- Antibiotice Iași (1955– )^{public}
- Apotex (1974– ; owned by SK Capital Partners)^{public}
- Apricus (1987– )^{public}
- Arbutus (2007– )^{public}
- Arena (1997– )^{public}
- Array (subsidiary of Pfizer; 1998– )^{public}
- Arrowhead (2004– )^{public}
- AryoGen (2009– )^{private}
- Aspen Pharmacare (a pharma holding company; 1850– )^{public}
- Assertio (1995– )^{public}
- Astellas (2005– )^{public}
- Astex (1999– )
- AstraZeneca (1999– )^{public}
- aTyr (2005– )^{public}
- Aurobindo (1986– )^{public}
- Australian Pharmaceutical Industries (subsidiary of Wesfarmers; 1910– )
- Avax (bef. 2006– )^{public}
- Avella (1996– )

=== B ===
- B. Braun (1839– )
- Barkat (2010– )
- Bausch & Lomb (subsidiary of Bausch Health; 1853– )
- Bausch Health (1959– )
- Bavarian Nordic (1994– )
- Baxalta (subsidiary of Takeda; 2015- )
- Baxter (1931– )
- Bayer (1863– )
- BCM (subsidiary of Fareva; 1991– )
- Beacon (2006– )
- Beam (2017– )
- Behestan Darou (2001– )
- Bengal Chemicals and Pharmaceuticals (1901– )
- Benitec (1997– )
- BeOne Medicines (2010– )
- Berlin Chemie (1890– )
- Besins Healthcare (1885– )
- Beximco (1976– )
- Bharat Biotech (1996– )
- Bial (1924– )
- Biocon (1978– )
- BioCryst (1986– )
- Bioderma (1977– )
- Bio Farma (1890– )
- Biogen (1978– )
- Bioinvent (1983– )
- BioLineRx (2003– )
- Biological E. Limited (1953- )
- BioMarin (1997– )
- Biomed-Lublin (1944- )
- bioMérieux (1963– )
- BiondVax (2003– )
- BioNTech (2008- )
- Biosplice (2008- )
- Bioverativ (subsidiary of Sanofi; 2016– )
- Biovista (2005– )
- Bluepharma (1990s– )
- Boehringer Ingelheim (1885– )
- Bosnalijek (1951– )
- Bracco (1927– )
- Bristol Myers Squibb (1887– )
- BTG Limited (subsidiary of Boston Scientific; 1991– )
- Buckley's (1919- ; acquired by Novartis)

=== C ===
- Cadila (1952– )
- Camurus (1991– )
- Canadian Plasma Resources (2012– )
- CanSinoBIO (2009– )
- Capsugel (1931– )
- Catalent (2007– )
- Catalyst (2002– )
- Cathay Drug (1952– )
- Cederroth (subsidiary of Orkla; 1895– )
- Cel-Sci (1983– )
- Celltrion (2002– )
- Cencora (2001– )
- Ceragenix (????– )
- Cerevel (subsidiary of Abbvie; 2018– )
- CFR (1922– ; acquired by Abbott)
- Cheplapharm Arzneimittel (1998– )
- Cheng Fong (Before 2016– )
- Chiesi (1935– )
- Chong Kun Dang (1941– )
- Chugai (subsidiary of Roche; 1943- )
- CinnaGen (1994– )
- Cipla (1935– )
- Civica Rx (2018– )
- Clovis Oncology (2009– )
- Coco (2013– )
- Combe (1949– )
- Compass Pathways (2016– )
- Compugen (1993– )
- Concord (2000– )
- Cobel Darou (2001– )
- Corcept (1998– )
- Crookes Healthcare (subsidiary of Reckitt Benckiser; 1918– )
- CSL (1916– )
- CSL Behring (subsidiary of CSL; 1904– )
- CSPC (1992- )
- CSPC Zhongrun (1989– )
- Curaxys (bef 2025- )
- CureVac (2000– )
- Cyclacel (1997– )
- Cynapsus (subsidiary of Sunovion; 1984- )
- Cytokinetics (1997– )
- CytRx (1985– )

=== D-E ===
- Daewoong (1945– )
- Daiichi Sankyo (2005– )
- Danco (2000– )
- Darou Pakhsh (1956– )
- Dawa (1994– )
- Debiopharm (1979– )
- Dechra (1997- )
- Definium Therapeutics (2019- )
- Delix (2019– )
- Dentsply Sirona (1899– )
- Dermapharm (1991– )
- Deurali-Janta (1988– )
- Diamyd Medical (bef 2026- )
- Diffusion (2001– )
- Dishman Carbogen Amcis (1983– )
- Divi's Laboratories (1990– )
- Douglas (1967– )
- Dr. Reddy's Laboratories (1984– )
- Editas Medicine (2013– )
- Eisai (1944– )
- Elder (1989– )
- Eli Lilly and Company (1876– )
- Emcure (1983– )
- Emergent (1998– )
- EMS (1950– )
- Endo (1997– )
- Endocyte (1996– )
- Epitopoietic Research Corporation (2006– )
- Esperion (2008– )
- Essential Drugs Company (1962- ; state owned)
- Esteve (1920– )
- Eurofarma (1972- )
- Excision BioTherapeutics (2015- )
- Exelgyn (1997- )
- EyePoint (before 2004– ; formerly pSivida)

=== F—G ===
- Fabre-Kramer (1992– )
- Fareva (1985– )
- Faron (2003– )
- Fermentek (1995– )
- Ferring (1950– )
- Filana (1998– )
- FLAVORx (1995– )
- Flexion (2007– )
- Fortress (2006– )
- Fortune Pharmacal (1954– )
- Fosun (1994- )
- Fresenius (1912– )
- Fulhold (2014– )
- G1 (2008- ;owned by Pharmacosmos)
- G.D. Searle (1888– ; subsidiary of Pfizer)
- Galapagos NV (1999– )
- Galderma (1981– )
- Galenika (1945– )
- Gedeon Richter (1901– )
- GenBioPro (bef 1999- )
- Genentech (1976– ; subsidiary of Roche)
- General (1984– )
- Genmab (1999– )
- Genset (1989– )
- Giaconda (2004– )
- Gilead (1987– )
- Glatt group (1954– )
- GlaxoSmithKline (1924– )
- GlaxoSmithKline Biologics (1945– )
- Glenmark (1977– )
- GlobeImmune (1995- )
- Granules India (1984– )
- Green Cross (1967– )
- Grifols (1940– )
- Grindeks (1946– )
- Grünenthal (1946– )
- GSK (2000– )
- GSK Pakistan (2001– )
- Guangzhou (1951– )
- GW (1998– ; subsidiary of Jazz Pharmaceuticals)

=== H—I ===
- HAL Allergy Group (1959– )
- Hanhong (2012– )
- Hanmi (1973– )
- Hansoh (1995– )
- Harbin (1988- )
- Harrow Health (2012– )
- Hebei Yuxing Bio-Engineering Co. Ltd (????– )
- Helixmith (1996– )^{public}
- Help Remedies (2008– )
- Helus (2019– )
- Herron (????– ; subsidiary of Perrigo)
- Hetero Drugs (1993– )
- Hikma (1978– )
- Hindustan Antibiotics (1954– )
- HIPRA (1971– )
- Hisamitsu (1847– )
- Hoechst AG (subsidiary of Sanofi; 1863– )
- Horizon (subsidiary of Amgen; 2005– )
- Hospira (2004– )
- Hovid (1980– )
- Hovione (1959– )
- Huadong Medicine (1993– )
- Hypera (2001– )
- IFM (2015– )
- Immuron (bef 2005– )
- Immutep (2001- )
- Incepta (1999– )
- Incyte (2002– )
- Innate (bef 2009– )
- iNova (Bef 2022- ; owned by Pacific Equity Partners)
- Intarcia (1995– )
- Intas (1984– )
- Intellia (2014– )
- Ionis (1989– )
- Ipca (1949– )
- Ipsen (1929– )
- ITH (2008– )

=== J—L ===
- Jaber Ebne Hayyan (1960– )
- Janssen (1953– ; acquired by Johnson & Johnson)
- Janssen Biotech (1979- ; Janssen subsidiary)
- Janssen Vaccines (1993 - ; Janssen subsidiary)
- Jazz (2003– )
- Jenapharm (1950- )
- Jiangsu Hengrui (1970- )
- Jilin Aodong Medicine (1993– )
- Johnson & Johnson (1886– )
- Jointown (1999- )
- Jones (1981– )
- Julphar (1980– )
- Kadmon (subsidiary of Sanofi; 2009– )
- Kalbe Farma (1966– )
- Kamada (1990– )
- Kangmei (????– )
- KannaLife (2010– )
- Kentam Products Limited (????– )
- Kerala State Drugs and Pharmaceuticals Limited (1974– )
- Kimia Farma (1971– )
- Kinetic Concepts (pharma activities: 2008– )
- King (subsidiary of Pfizer; 1993– )
- Kissei (1946– )
- Kite (2009– )
- Knight (1995– )
- Kunming (Before 2007– )
- Kyowa Kirin (1949– )
- Laboratoires Expanscience (1950– )
- Laboratoires Pierre Fabre (1951– )
- Laboratoires Servier (1954– )
- Laurus Labs (2005– )
- Lavipharm (1911– )
- Leadiant (1957– )
- Leo (1908– )
- Lexicon (1995– )
- LIFSE (1947– )
- Ligand (1987– )
- Lijun (Before 2005– )
- Liminal (1988– ; owned by Thomvest Asset Management)
- Lion (1918– )
- Locus (2015– )
- Loghman (1968– )
- Lundbeck (1915– )
- Lundbeck Seattle (2004– )
- Lupin Limited (1968– )

=== M ===
- Mallinckrodt (1867– )
- MannKind Corporation (1991– )
- Mankind (1991– )
- Mapp (2003– )
- Martin Dow (1995– )
- Massone (????- )
- McGuff (1979– )
- McKesson Europe (1835– )
- McNeil Consumer Healthcare (subsidiary of Kenvue; 1879– )
- Meda (subsidiary of Viatris; 1991– )
- Medac (1970– )
- Medivir (1988– )^{public}
- Medochemie (1976– )
- Meiji Seika (1916– )
- Melinta (2000– )
- Melior Discovery (2005– )
- Menarini (1886– )
- Mentholatum (subsidiary of Rohto; 1889– )
- Merck & Co. (1891– )
- Merck Group (1668– )
- Meridian Medical Technologies (subsidiary of Pfizer; 1968– )
- Merrimack (2000– )
- Merz (1908– )
- Microgen (2003– )
- MindMed (2019– )
- Mitsubishi Tanabe (2007– )
- Mochida (1945– )
- Moderna (2010– )
- Molecular Partners (2004– )
- Mundipharma (1952– )
- Mustang (2015– )
- Mydecine (2020- )
- Myrexis (1999– )
- Myriad Genetics (1991– )

=== N ===
- Nanjing Ange (2003– )
- Napp (1923– )
- Natco (1981– )
- NatiVita (2012– )
- NeilMed (1999– )
- Neimeth (1997– )
- Nektar (1990– )
- Neurolixis (2011– )
- Neuropathix (bef 2016– )
- New England Compounding Center (1998– )
- NicOx (1996– )
- Nippon Kayaku (1916– )
- Nippon Soda (1920– )
- North China (1953- )
- Northwest Biotherapeutics (1998– )
- Norwich Pharma Services (1887– )
- NovaBay (2000– )
- Novartis (1996– )
- Novartis Gene Therapies (2012– ; subsidiary of Novartis)
- Novavax (1987– )
- Novo (1923– )
- NovoBiotic (2003– )
- Noxxon (1997– )
- Nycomed (1874– ; subsidiary of Takeda)

=== O ===
- Ocean Biomedical (2019– )
- Octapharma (1983– )
- Olainfarm (1972– )
- Omega (1987– ; subsidiary of Perrigo)
- Oncolytics (1998– )
- Ono (1717– )
- Oramed (2006– )
- Orchid (1992– )
- Orexigen (2002– )
- Orexo (1995– )
- Organon & Co. (2020- )
- Orifarm (1994- )
- Orion (1965– )
- Orion (1917– )
- Ortho-McNeil (1993– )
- Otis Clapp (subsidiary of Medique; 1840–)
- Otsuka (1964– )
- Ovation (2000– )
- Oxford Biomedica (1995– )
- Oystershell NV (1979– )

=== P-Q ===
- PainCeptor (2004– )
- Panacea Biotec (1984– )
- Panaxia (2010- )
- PATH (1977– )
- Patheon (1974– )
- Perrigo (1887– )
- Pfizer (1849– )
- Pfizer UK (subsidiary of Pfizer; 1952– )
- Pharmaceutical Product Development (1985– )
- Pharma Nord (1981– )
- Pharmacosmos (1965– )
- Pharmaniaga (1994– )
- Pharmascience (1983– )
- Pharmavite (subsidiary of Otsuka; 1971– )
- Pharmstandard (2003– )
- Phoenix Pharmahandel (1994– )
- Phibro Animal Health (1946- )
- Photocure (1993– )
- Piramal Group (1984– )
- PKU Healthcare (1993– )
- Pluri (2001– )
- Portola (2003– )
- Prasco (2002– )
- Precision (2006– )
- Procter & Gamble (1837– )
- ProMetic Life Sciences (1994– )
- Promomed (2005– )
- ProQR (2012– )
- Protalix (1993– )
- Protein Sciences (subsidiary of Sanofi; before 2013– )
- Protek (1990– )
- Proteon (2001– )
- Puma (2010– )
- Quantum (2004– )
- Quark (1993– )

=== R ===
- R-Pharm (2001– )
- Ratiopharm (1974– )
- Reata (2002– ; subsidiary of Biogen)
- Reckitt (1999– )
- Regeneron (1988– )
- Regulus (2007– )
- Renata (1993– )
- Repligen (1981– )
- Retrotope (2006– )
- Roche (1896– )
- Rohto (1949– )
- Romat (1992– )
- RosePharma (2003– )
- Rowell (1929– )
- RPG (1993– )
- Rubicon Research (1999– )
- Ryukakusan (1871– )

=== S ===
- Saidal (1984– )
- Salix (1989– ; subsidiary of Bausch Health)
- Salubris (1998– )
- Samsung Biologics (2011– )
- Sangamo (1995– )
- Sankogan (1319– )
- Sanofi (2004– )
- Sanofi Pasteur (2004- ; subsidiary of Sanofi)
- Santen (1890– )
- Sarepta (1980– )
- Sato (1939– )
- Seagen (1997– )
- SEPPIC (1943– )
- Serum Institute of India (1966– )
- Servier (1954– )
- Sanitas (1922– )
- Shandong Taibang (bef 2021- ; subsidiary of China Biologic Products)
- Shanghai (1994- )
- Shantha Biotechnics (1993- ; subsidiary of Sanofi)
- Sheffield (1880– )
- Shenzhen Kangtai (1992- )
- Shionogi (1878– )
- Sido Muncul (1940– )
- SIGA (1995– )
- Sihuan (Before 2014- )
- Silence (1994- )
- Simcere (1995- )
- Sino (2000- )
- Sinopharm (1998- )
- Sinopharm Group (2003– )
- Sinovac (1999– )
- SK+F (1990– )
- Smith (1944– )
- Solopharm (2010– )
- Solvay (1863– )
- Somnogen Canada Inc (????– )
- Spark (2013– )
- Spectrum (before 2018– )
- Spotlight Innovation (pharmaceutical holding company; 2012– )
- Square (1958– )
- Stada Arzneimittel (1895– )
- Stallergenes Greer (2015– )
- SPC (1971– )
- Sphere Fluidics (2010– )
- Square (1958– )
- STADA Arzneimittel (1895– )
- Stiefel (subsidiary of GlaxoSmithKline; 1847– )
- Strides (1990– )
- Stryker (1941– )
- Sumitomo (2005– )
- Sun (1983– )
- Sunovion (1984– ; subsidiary of Sumitomo)
- Sutro (2003– )
- Swedish Orphan Biovitrum (2001– )
- Synthaverse S.A. (1944– )
- Synthon (1991– )

=== T ===
- Taisho (1912– )
- Takeda (1781– )
- Taro (1950– )
- Tasly (1994– )
- Teijin (1918– )
- Temmler (1917– )
- Terapia Ranbaxy (1921– )
- Teva (1901– )
- Teva Active Pharmaceutical Ingredients (division of Teva; 1935– )
- Teva Canada (1965– )
- Theramex (2018– )
- Theraplix (subsidiary of Sanofi; 1931– )
- Thornton & Ross (1922– )
- Tilray (2013– )
- TME (1997– )
- Tonix (2011– )
- Torque (1985- )
- Torrent (1959– )
- Transgene (1979– )
- Troikaa (1983– )
- TTK Group (1928– )
- Turing (2015– )

=== U—Z ===
- UCB (1928– )
- UMass Chan Medical School (1894- ; via MassBiologics unit)
- Unichem (1944– )
- Unilab (1945– )
- Unilever (1929– )
- USV (1961– )
- Valneva (2013- )
- Veloxis (1999– )
- Vernalis Research (subsidiary of Hitgen; 2018– )
- Vertex (1989– )
- Vianex (1971– )
- Viatris (2020– )
- ViiV Healthcare (2009– )^{joint venture}
- Vivimed Labs (1988– )
- Weifa (1940– )
- Wilson Therapeutics (2012– )
- Wockhardt (1960s– )
- Wörwag (1971– )
- Xiamen Innovax Biotech (before 2012- )
- Xiangxue (1986– )
- Yangtze River (1971- )
- Yuhan (1926– )
- Yunnan Baiyao Group (Before 2016– )
- Zambon (1906– )
- Zandu Realty (1910– )
- Zealand (1998– )
- Zentiva (1998– )
- Zeria (1955– )
- Zoetis (1952– )
- Zydus (1952– )
- Zymeworks (2003– )

== Alphabetical listing—defunct firms ==
=== #—A ===
- 3M (mid-1960s to 2006; multi-deal divestment from parent, 3M)
- Abraxis (2001–before 2016; acquired by Celgene)
- Actavis (1984–2015)
- Actelion (1997–2017)
- Advaxis (2006–2023; merged with Ayala)
- Aerie (2005–2022; acquired by Alcon)
- Akorn (1971–2023; went bankrupt)
- Alimera (2003–2024; acquired by ANI)
- Allen & Hanburys (1715–1958)
- Allergan Inc. (2013–2019; acquired by Actavis)
- Allozyne (2005–2014; acquired by MedImmune)
- Alza (1968–2001; acquired by J&J)
- Ambit (c.2010–2014)
- Amersham plc (1946–2003)
- Amylin (1987–2012)
- Anacor (2002–2016)
- Antibe (2010–2024; went bankrupt)
- Antikamnia (1890–1930; acquired by Block Drug Company)
- ApothéCure (1991–2013; killed by litigation)
- Aptalis (2011–2014; acquired by Forest Laboratories)
- Arab Pharmaceutical Manufacturing (1962–2007; acquired by Hikma)
- ARIAD (1991–2017; merged into Takeda)
- Astra (1913–1999; merged with Zeneca to form AstraZeneca)
- Aurora (1995–2001; acquired by Vertex)
- Ayrton (1965–2020; multiple company merger to form DAS Pharma)

=== B—D ===
- Barr (1970–2008; acquired by Teva)
- Baxalta (2015–2016)
- Beecham Group (1859–1989)
- Bickford's Australia (1840–1930; merged into Drug Houses of Astralia)
- Biolex (1997–2012; went bankrupt)
- Bionova (1996–abt 2012)
- Biotie Therapies (1998–2016)
- Biovail (1991–2010; merged into Valeant)
- Biovest (–after 2017)
- Block Drug (1907–2001)
- Boehringer Mannheim (1817–1997)
- Bradley (1985–2008)
- British Biotech (1986–2003)
- Buckley's (1919–2002)
- Calcutta Chemical Company (1916–????)
- Cambridge Antibody Technology (1989–2007)
- CancerVax (1998–2005)
- Cangene (1984–2014)
- CareFusion (2009–2015)
- Celgene (1986–2019; acquired by Bristol Myers Squibb)
- Celltech (1980–2004)
- Cephalon (1987–2011)
- Chemidex (1981–????)
- Chiron Corporation (1981–2006)
- Chiroscience (1991–1999)
- Covidien (2007–2015)
- Crucell (2000–2010)
- Cubist (1992–2015)
- Cutter (1897–1974)
- Cynapsus (1984–2016)
- Dabur (1884–2008)
- Dawakhana Shifaul Amraz (1894–2000)
- Distillers (1942–1963)
- Drug Houses of Australia (1936–2006)

=== E—L ===
- Élan (1969–2013)
- Empire (1959–1967; assets distributed among family of founder)
- Epix (20??–2009; closed due to insufficient funds to continue)
- Farmitalia (1935–1978; merged with Carlo Erba SpA)
- Faulding (1988–2021; voluntary intention to close)
- Fisons (1843–1995)
- Forest (1956–2014; acquired by Actavis)
- Galena (2006–2017; acquired by Sellas Life Sciences Group)
- Genetics Institute (1980–1996)
- Genzyme (1981–2022; integrated into Sanofi)
- G.F. Harvey Company (1880–1958; acquired by Bard)
- GPC Biotech (1997–2009)
- Green Cross (1950–1998; merged into Yoshitomi)
- Graceway (????–2011; went bankrupt)
- GTx (1997–2019; reverse merger to form Oncternal Therapeutics, Inc.)
- H. K. Mulford (late 1880s–1929; acquired by Sharp & Dohme)
- Hafslund Nycomed (1986–1996; demerged from parent Hafslund and merged with Amersham)
- Hospira (2004–2015)
- Human Genome Sciences (1992–2012)
- IL (????–2006; acquired by Pacgen)
- ImmunoGen (1981–2024)
- Immunomedics (1982–2020)
- Indian Drugs and Pharmaceuticals (1961–2021; dissolved by Government of Indian)
- Institute for OneWorld Health (2000–2011)
- Insys (1990–2019)
- Intercell (1998-2013; merged with Vivalis to form Valneva)
- ISTA (1992–2012; acquired by Bausch & Lomb)
- James Woolley, Sons and Co. (1833–1962)
- Jenapharm (1950–2001)
- Jennerex (2003–2014; acquired by SillaJen
- Jerini (1994–2009; acquired by Theracode)
- Juno (2013–2018; acquired by Celgene)
- Knoll (1886–1975)
- KV (1942–2009)
- Leiner Health Products (1973–2008)

=== M—P ===
- Marathon (bef 2015–aft 2017)
- Martek (1985–2011)
- Massone (company) (????- )
- Mayne (2005–2007)
- Maxygen (1997–2013)
- Medarex (1987–2009)
- Meda (1995–2016)
- MedImmune (1988–2019)
- Medivation (2004–2016; acquired by Pfizer)
- Meyer Brothers (1852–1981; acquired by Fox Meyer Health Corporation)
- Miles Laboratories (1884–1995; consolidated into Bayer AG)
- Movetis (2006–2010; acquired by Shire)
- Mylan (1961–2019; merged with Upjohn to form Viatris)
- Nederlandsche Cocaïnefabriek (1900–1962; acquired by Koninklijke Zwanenberg Organon)
- Nereus (1988–2012; acquired by Triphase Research and Development)
- Nuvelo (1992–2009; acquired by ARCA Biopharma)
- Onyx (1992–2013; acquired by Amgen)
- Opsona (2004–2019; liquidation after failed clinical trials)
- Ortho (1931–1993)
- OSI (1983–2010)
- Par (1978–2015)
- Parke-Davis (1866–1970)
- Perseid^{JV} (2009–2011)
- Pharmacia (1911–1995)
- Pharmacia & Upjohn (1995–2002)
- Plexxikon (2001–2011; acquired by the Daiichi Sankyo)
- Pliva (1921–2006; acquired by Barr)
- Poulenc Frères (1827–1928; merged with another firm to form Rhone-Poulenc)
- PowderJect (1993–2003; acquired by Chiron)
- Profound (1999–2008; acquired by Maxygen)
- Proteolix (2003–2009; acquired by Onyx)
- Purdue (1892–2019; bankrupt)

=== R—T ===
- Ranbaxy Laboratories (1961–2014; acquired by Daiichi Sankyo, then by Sun Pharma)
- Reliant (????–2007; acquired by GSK)
- Renovo (1998–2011)
- Repros (1987–2019; Allergan subsidiary from 2017; Allergan acquired by Abbvie in 2019)
- Rhône-Poulenc (1928–1999; merged with a Hoescht AG unit to form Aventis)
- Roussel Uclaf (1911–1997; acquired by Hoeschst AG)
- S. E. Massengill (1898–2011; acquired by Prestige Brands)
- Salix (1989–2015)
- Sanofi Pasteur (2004–2016)
- Santaris (2003–2023; acquired by Roche, 2014, and renamed Roche Innovation Center Copenhagen; unit closed 2023)
- Schering AG (1851–2006)
- Schering-Plough (1971–2009; merged with Merck & Co. to form new Merck & Co. firm)
- Scioderm (2013–2015; acquired by Amicus Therapeutics)
- Serono (1906–2006)
- Shire (1986–2019)
- Sigma Healthcare (1912–2010; pharma unit divested in 2010)
- Smith, Kline & French (1891–2000; merger with Glaxo Wellcome to form GSK)
- Starwin (1960–2020; among multiple firms merged to form DAS Pharma)
- Sterling (1901–1994; acquired by SmithKline Beecham)
- Sucampo (1996–2018)
- Sumitomo Chemical (pharmaceutical work from 1971 to 2005)
- Syntex (1944–1994; acquired by Roche)
- Tanox (1986–2007; acquired by Genentech)
- Telesta (1979–2016; acquired by ProMetic)
- Tibotec (1994–2002; merged into Janssen)
- Trubion (1999–2010; acquired by Emergent BioSolutions)

=== U—Z ===
- Upjohn (1886–1995)
- Union de Pharmacologie Scientifique Appliquée (1935–1994)
- Vectura (1997–2021)
- Vernalis Group (1991–2003; acquired by British Biotech)
- Vernalis plc (2003–2018; acquired by Ligand)
- Vincent Chemical Co. (1919-????; fate and end date unknown)
- ViroPharma (1994–2014; acquired by Shire)
- Warner Chilcott (1968–2013; acquired by Actavis)
- Warner-Lambert (1955–2000)
- William H. Rorer, Inc. (1910–1990; merged with Rhône-Poulenc to form Rhône-Poulenc Rorer)
- Wyeth (1860–2009)
- Zeneca (1993–1999)
- Zonite (1922–aft 1955)
- ZymoGenetics (1981–2019)

== See also ==
- List of largest biomedical companies by market capitalization
- List of largest biomedical companies by revenue
- List of pharmaceutical manufacturers in the UK
- Lists of investigational drugs
- List of psychedelic pharmaceutical companies
