= McGoff =

McGoff is a surname. Notable people with the surname include:

- John P. McGoff (1925–1998), American conservative newspaper publisher
- Ruairi McGoff (born 1985), Canadian rugby league player

== See also ==
- McGuff
