= Kim Sung-Hou =

American structural biologist

- Born: 1937 (age 88–89); Korea, Empire of Japan
- Education: Seoul National University (B.S., 1960) (M.S., 1962); University of Pittsburgh (Ph.D, 1966)
- Occupations: Structural biologist and biophysicist
- Awards: Fulbright Fellowship (1962) Guggenheim Fellowship (1985) Ernest O. Lawrence Award (1987) Princess Takamatsu Award (1989) Ho-am Prize (1994)

Korean name
- Hangul: 김성호
- Hanja: 金聖浩
- RR: Gim Seongho
- MR: Kim Sŏngho

Kim Sung-Hou (Korean: 김성호; born 1937) is a Korean-born American structural biologist and biophysicist. Kim reported the first 3D structure of tRNA with A. Rich in 1973. He also published many papers on the structures of protein molecules including human Ras, human cyclin dependent kinase 2 and small heat shock protein. He is a member of the U.S. National Academy of Sciences and a fellow of the American Academy of Arts and Sciences since 1994. He is currently a professor in the department of chemistry at the U.C. Berkeley and a faculty scientist at Lawrence Berkeley National Laboratory (LBL).

== Biography ==
Kim Sung-Hou was born in Korea (1937). He obtained his B.S. (1960) and M.S. (1962) in chemistry from Seoul National University, South Korea, and his PhD in 1966 from the University of Pittsburgh. From 1966 to 1970 he was a research associate at the Massachusetts Institute of Technology under Alexander Rich, and a senior research scientist there from 1970 to 1972, also with Rich.

From 1972 to 1978, he served as assistant and associate professor at the department of biochemistry, Duke University School of Medicine, and as professor at the department of chemistry, University of California, Berkeley, from 1978 to present.

== Controversy over structure of tRNA ==
There was some intense competition among several groups worldwide for solving the 3D structure of tRNA during the sixties and early seventies. The final round was between MIT's Rich group and Aaron Klug's group at Cambridge. Kim, while at MIT, first published the 4Å backbone structure in Science in 1973. The next year, Rich's group came up with the 3Å structure.

At a symposium held in June 1974, both Rich and Robertus from Klug's group presented their results with little detail. Afterwards Klug's group argued and complained to Francis Crick that Rich's group published a paper in Science within a month of the symposium influenced by what they had heard which differed in some details from Rich's earlier 3 Å structure. Two weeks later a Nature paper by Klug's group presented their 3 Å structure. Crick wrote to Rich concerning Klug's accusation. However, Rich denied any scientific misconduct.

The controversy arose from Klug's group not realizing that there were two tRNA models in the US: the MIT model (produced by Rich's team) and the Duke model (produced by Kim's team; Kim had moved to Duke University in 1972). There had been a breakdown of communication between the MIT and Duke groups in 1973-1974, during which period the models were developed independently. The Science paper in 1974 was based on the Duke model, which reconfirmed the correctness of the original backbone structure, and revealed an atomic structure that differed in a few details from the MIT model and, as it turned out, from the Cambridge model as well. The existence of the Duke model was later recognized and acknowledged by Crick. The controversy would have been resolved at the outset if it had been informed to Klug's group that the Science paper in 1974 was based specifically on the tRNA structural model of Kim's laboratory at Duke University, not on the MIT model.

== Plexxikon ==
In 2001, Kim co-founded Plexxikon with Professor Joseph Schlessinger of Yale University. Plexxikon uses a pioneering structural biology-based platform as a technique for drug discovery and development.
