= Plexxikon =

American drug discovery company

- Type: Subsidiary
- Industry: Biotechnology
- Founded: 2001
- Founder: Joseph Schlessinger
- Defunct: 2011; 15 years ago
- Fate: Acquired by the Daiichi Sankyo
- Headquarters: South San Francisco, California, United States.
- Website: www.plexxikon.com

Plexxikon is an American drug discovery company based in South San Francisco, California. It was co-founded in 2001 by Joseph Schlessinger of Yale University, and Sung-Hou Kim of the University of California, Berkeley.

It uses a proprietary structural biology-based platform called Scaffold-Based Drug Discovery to build a pipeline of products in multiple therapeutic areas. This discovery process integrates multiple technologies, including structural screening as one key component, that it hopes will give a significant competitive advantage over other approaches.

In April 2011, Plexxikon was acquired by the Japanese pharmaceutical company Daiichi Sankyo for $805 million and an additional $130 million in potential milestone payments.

Daiichi Sankyo announced the shutdown of Plexxikon in 2022.

== Drug pipeline ==
- Vemurafenib (Zelboraf) and pexidartinib (Turalio) are two FDA approved drugs developed by Plexxikon
- Plexxikon is collaborating with Wyeth Pharmaceuticals on several products for use in type II diabetes and other metabolic disorders. The most advanced of these agents is indeglitazar (PLX204), which is currently in Phase II clinical trials for type 2 diabetes.
- PLX7486 is a CSF1R antagonist and pan-TRK inhibitor in clinical trials for advanced solid tumors.

== See also ==
- NeilMed Pharmaceuticals
- Onyx Pharmaceuticals
