= Menotropin =

Pharmaceutical drug

Clinical data
- Trade names: Repronex
- MedlinePlus: a601002
- ATC code: G03GA02 (WHO)

Identifiers
- CAS Number: 61489-71-2
- ChemSpider: none
- UNII: 5Y9QQM372Q
- CompTox Dashboard (EPA): DTXSID50904983 DTXSID3040483, DTXSID50904983
- ECHA InfoCard: 100.119.926

Menotropin (also called human menopausal gonadotropin or hMG) is a hormonally active medication for the treatment of fertility disturbances. Frequently the plural is used as the medication is a mixture of gonadotropins. Menotropins are extracted from the urine of postmenopausal women.

== Description and usage ==
Urine of postmenopausal women reflects the hypergonadotropic state of menopause -levels of follicle stimulating hormone (FSH) and luteinizing hormone (LH) are high - and contain a mixture of these gonadotropins. Other protein substances may be present, including small amounts of human chorionic gonadotropin (hCG). In 1949 Piero Donini found a relatively simple method to extract gonadotropins from urine of postmenopausal women. Menotropins were successfully introduced into clinical use by Bruno Lunenfeld in 1961. While earlier menotropin medications contained FSH and LH at a 1:1 ratio, the recognition that it is FSH that is critical for follicle stimulation has led to development of newer preparations that contain a much higher FSH/LH ratio, Fertinex being an example.

Menotropin preparations are designed for use in selected women where they stimulate the ovaries to mature follicles, thus making them more fertile. They are administered by typically daily injection, intramuscularly or subcutaneously, for about ten days under close supervision to adjust dose and duration of therapy. They can also be used in hypogonadal men to stimulate sperm production.

Human urinary-derived menotropin preparations are exposed to the theoretical risk of infection from menopausal donors of urine. Nevertheless, the failure to irrefutably demonstrate infectivity following intracerebral inoculation with urine from transmissible spongiform encephalopathy (TSE)-infected hosts suggests that the risk associated with products derived from urine is merely theoretical.

Recombinant gonadotropins have to a large degree replaced hMG in fertility treatments. The recombinant process allows for the production of pure FSH or LH not "contaminated" by other proteins that may be present after urinary extraction. While some head-on studies seem not to suggest that "pure FSH" gives better results than hMG, others claim that recombinant FSH is more efficient and reduces costs. A Cochrane Collaboration analysis did not reveal major differences in clinical outcomes when comparing urinary versus recombinant FSH.

The Practice Committee of the American Society for Reproductive Medicine reported: "Compared with earlier crude animal extracts, modern highly purified urinary and recombinant gonadotropin products have clearly superior quality, specific activity, and performance. There are no confirmed differences in safety, purity, or clinical efficacy among the various available urinary or recombinant gonadotropin products."

== List of hMG preparations ==
A number of drug companies have and had marketed hMG preparations that include:

- Gynogen HP (Sanzyme (P) Limited)

Highly purified urinary FSH and LH in 1:1 ratio

- Humog (Bharat Serums And Vaccines Ltd)

highly purified urinary FSH and LH in 1:1 ratio

- Humegon (Organon)
- Menopur (Ferring Pharmaceuticals), 75 IU FSH and 75 IU LH activity
- Merional, Meriofert (IBSA Institut)
- Menogon
- Metrodin (Serono)

highly purified urinary FSH

- Repronex (Ferring Pharmaceuticals), 75 IU FSH and 75 IU LH
- Pergonal (Serono),

Pergonal was the major hMG prior to the arrival of recombinant gonadotropins containing 75 IU FSH and 75 IU LH.

- HMG Massone, 75 IU FSH and 75 IU LH

== See also ==
- Gonadotropin preparations
