= Nanjing Ange Pharmaceutical =

Chinese pharmaceutical company

Nanjing Ange Pharmaceutical Co. 南京安格医药化工有限公司
- Industry: Pharmaceuticals, Healthcare
- Founded: 2003
- Headquarters: Nanjing, Jiangsu Province, China,
- Products: Antineoplastic medicine, pharmaceutical intermediates
- Number of employees: 35 (2007)
- Website: www.angepharm.com/

Nanjing Ange Pharmaceutical Co., Ltd. (simplified Chinese: 南京安格医药化工有限公司; traditional Chinese: 南京安格醫藥化工有限公司; pinyin: Nánjīng āngé yīyào huàgōng yǒuxiàn gōngsī) is a pharmaceutical company in Nanjing, in the People's Republic of China, specializing in the development of "New Drugs" (the drugs that previously have not been marketed in China, i.e., New Chemical Entities for China's FDA) as well as the research, development, production and trade of chemical APIs and pharmaceutical intermediates.

== Company Profile ==
Ange was founded in 2003, and is now a leading company in the Chinese pharmaceutical industry. With almost every major university in Nanjing Ange has established cooperative relationships and laboratories, including China Pharmaceutical University, China's first independent school of pharmacy and one of the few institutes with complete pharmaceutical fields.

== Main Products ==
Ange's main products are Antineoplastic medicines, which include:

- Sunitinib
- Lapatinib
- Nilotinib
- Dasatinib
- Gefitinib
- Erlotinib
- Imatinib
- Canertinib

It also produces relative pharmaceutical intermediates.

== Recent Projects ==
In the past 2 years, Ange has been working with Abbott Laboratories Ltd. and Simcere Pharmaceutical Group, etc.
