= Cobel Darou =

Iranian pharmaceutical company

- Company type: Private
- Industry: Pharmaceutical
- Founded: August 20, 2001
- Headquarters: Tehran, Iran
- Key people: Nima Barardjanian
- Number of employees: 1000+ (2020)
- Website: https://cobelgroup.com/

Cobel Darou (Persian: کوبل دارو) headquartered in Tehran, Iran, is one of the biggest pharmaceutical companies in Iran. Cobel Darou engages in the research, registration, importing and marketing of pharmaceutical products for sale principally in the prescription market. Cobel Darou covers the most major therapeutic areas: cardiovascular, oncology, diabetes, central nervous system, internal medicine and vaccines.
