= McGuff =

McGuff is a surname. Notable people with the surname include:

- Kevin McGuff (born 1969), American women's basketball coach
- Joe McGuff (1926–2006), American journalist, author and newspaper editor

== See also ==
- McGuff Companies, an American company
- McGruff the Crime Dog, an anthropomorphic animated character
