= Benitec Biopharma =

Benitec Biopharma Limited
- Type: Public
- Traded as: Nasdaq: BNTC
- Industry: RNA interference
- Founded: 1997; 29 years ago
- Headquarters: Melbourne, Victoria, Australia
- Key people: Michael Graham (founding scientist & head of discovery)
- Products: Gene silencing; Gene expression; RNA interference (ddRNAi)
- Website: www.benitec.com

Benitec Biopharma Limited is an Australian biotechnology company founded in 1997. It is engaged in the development of gene-silencing therapies for the treatment of chronic and life-threatening diseases using DNA-directed RNA interference (ddRNAi) technology.

The CSIRO has researched RNAi extensively, developing the small hairpin RNA concept employed in ddRNAi. Benitec Biopharma has an exclusive license to this ddRNAi technology in human therapeutic uses and research.

== Research and development ==
Benitec Biopharma is researching ddRNAi in the following fields:

- Hepatitis B (under development with partner Biomics Biotechnologies))
- Oculopharyngeal muscular dystrophy (OPMD)
