= Troikaa Pharmaceuticals =

Indian Pharmaceutical company

Troikaa Pharmaceuticals Ltd.
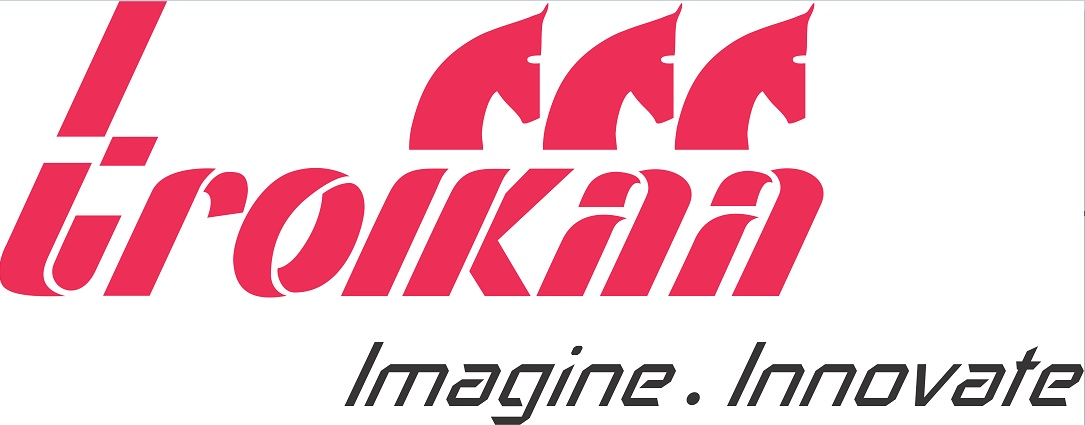
- Company type: Private
- Industry: Pharmaceuticals
- Founded: 1983
- Founder: Mr. Rajni V. Patel
- Headquarters: Ahmedabad, Gujarat, India
- Area served: Worldwide
- Key people: Dr. Ketan R. Patel (Chairman & managing director); Mr. Milan R. Patel (Joint Managing Director)
- Products: Pharmaceuticals, Branded and Generic drugs,
- Number of employees: 2300+ (2019)
- Website: www.troikaa.com

Troikaa Pharmaceuticals is an Indian multinational pharmaceutical company headquartered in Ahmedabad city of Gujarat, India. It is a public unlisted company and is classified as company limited by shares.

== History ==
Troikaa Pharmaceuticals limited was established in 1983 in Ahmedabad, Gujarat by Rajni V. Patel, one of the few pharmacy graduates, of the first batch of L. M. College of Pharmacy, Ahmedabad in 1950. Ketan Patel is the current Chairman & Managing Director of the company. According to article, he was named as "India’s pain killer" for inventing world's first painless diclofenac injection, which helps alleviate acute pain and inflammation. Milan R. Patel is Joint Managing Director of the company.

In May 2020, Troikaa received US Patent for one of its products 'Dynapar QPS'.

== Operations ==
Troikaa has three manufacturing facilities in Gujarat and Uttarakhand certified by ISO 9001:2000 and WHO GMP (The World Health Organization for following Good Manufacturing Practices). Company has six marketing divisions & strength of more than 2300 employees. Company has presence in more than 70 countries.

Troikaa secures its innovations related to Novel Drug Delivery systems through Patent co-operation treaty in more than 100 countries of the world.

== Litigation ==
In 2016, Troikaa Pharmaceuticals filed petition in Delhi High Court seeking license cancellation of Diclofenac Sodium Injection 75 mg/ml, manufactured by Themis Medicare Pvt Ltd and marketed by Novartis India Ltd. under the brand name Voveran 1ml.

Troikaa Pharmaceuticals claimed that the diclofenac sodium 75 mg/ml injection contained Transcutol-P which caused damage to the kidneys. In July 2018, India's Drug Regulator canceled the license granted to M/S Themis Medicare for the sale of Diclofenac injection 75 mg/ml containing Transcutol-P.

In 2012, Troikaa Pharmaceuticals suits a patent infringement in Ahmedabad district court against Ahmedabad-based Lincoln Pharmaceuticals and Delhi-based Akums Drug & Pharmaceuticals Ltd, saying the two companies had infringed upon its patented high concentration, low viscosity diclofenac injection. The case was continued by Gujarat High Court and ordered to Akums Drugs not to infringe as per the patent specification and dismissed Lincoln Pharma's appeal.

In 2008, Troikaa filed a suit for infringement of design against a company manufacturing D’ shaped tablets. The company had challenged that Troikaa's D-shaped tablet registration was invalid. The suit was transferred to the High Court of Gujarat and later in its first case under the Designs Act, the High Court decided in favor of the Troikaa.

== Awards & honors ==
- "The national award for R&D 2015" for "Dynapar QPS" by Ministry of Science and Technology (India) in Vigyan Bhavan, New Delhi.
- "India Pharma Innovation of the Year Award" 2018 by Shri Ananth Kumar, Union Minister of Chemicals and Fertilizers, Government of India
- Intellectual Property Excellence in India Award 2016
- IPA ACG Scitech Innovation Awards 2015
- In 2008, National Award for R & D efforts in the area of Physical & Biological Sciences, for developing Dynapar AQ.
