= Massone (company) =

- Industry: Pharmaceutical
- Headquarters: Buenos Aires, Argentina
- Products: Pharmaceutical products, fertility medicines

Massone S.A., also Instituto Massone S.A., is a pharmaceutical company based in Buenos Aires, Argentina.

== Products ==
Among others Massone produces hMG (human menopausal gonadotropins or menotropins). Menotropins are extracted from the urine of postmenopausal women and used in infertility therapy.
