= Spotlight Innovation =

American pharmaceutical holding company

Spotlight Innovation Inc.
- Type: Public
- Traded as: Inactive
- Industry: Health care
- Founded: 2006 (as American Exploration Corp.)
- Headquarters: Urbandale, Iowa, US
- Key people: John Krohn (CEO, President, COO)

Spotlight Innovation Inc. (OTCQB: STLT) [STATUS CLOSED] was an American pharmaceutical holding company. The company maintained two subsidiaries: Caretta Therapeutics, Inc. and Celtic Biotech Iowa, Inc. Spotlight Innovation Inc. is based in Urbandale, Iowa and was publicly traded on the OTCQB marketplace under the stock ticker symbol, STLT.

== History ==
Spotlight Innovation Inc. was founded in 2012 as Spotlight Innovation, LLC. It became its current iteration in December 2013 after a merger with American Exploration Corp. (AEXP), which had been founded in 2006. At the time of the merger, the new entity, Spotlight Innovation Inc., named Cristopher Grunewald the chief executive officer. The Financial Industry Regulatory Authority approved the name change and the merger on December 16, 2013. Spotlight Innovation began trading on the OTCQB marketplace as STLT in January 2014. In May 2017, Spotlight Innovation announced that Mr. Grunewald had resigned as CEO and that John Krohn, the company's President and Chief Operating Officer, had been appointed as the interim CEO.

In 2014, Spotlight Innovation founded Celtic Biotech Iowa, Inc., as a subsidiary and entered into a share exchange agreement with Celtic Biotech LTD (since rescinded), an Ireland-based pharmaceutical company developing products for the treatment of cancer and pain. According to the terms of the agreement, Celtic Biotech LTD became a subsidiary of Celtic Biotech Iowa, Inc. and was also granted access to Spotlight Innovation's commercialization and business development services. In April 2015, Celtic Biotech Iowa's first product, a formulation developed to facilitate topical delivery of drugs called EPISORB, was registered with the Food and Drug Administration and incorporated into the Pharmacy Benefit Managers database.; In Sept. 2018 the Directors of Celtic Biotech Ltd rescinded its share exchange agreement with Spotlight Innovation for just cause.

In March 2015, Spotlight entered into a purchase agreement with Memcine Pharmaceuticals, Inc., a Coralville, Iowa-based biotech company specializing in vaccine efficacy. Memcine Pharmaceuticals would officially become a Spotlight Innovation subsidiary in June 2015. In April 2015, Spotlight Innovation secured $2.5 million in financing from an unsecured convertible promissory note. In October 2016, Spotlight Innovation announced that it was discontinuing the Memcine Pharmaceuticals Immunoplex development program.

In August 2016 Spotlight Innovation entered into a sponsored research agreement with Florida State University to support the work of Professor Hengli Tang in the development of treatments for Zika virus infection.

In October 2016, Spotlight Innovation announced the formation of subsidiary Caretta Therapeutics, LLC. Caretta Therapeutics is based in Urbandale, Iowa. The subsidiary develops and markets over-the-counter (OTC) analgesic products formulated to provide relief from chronic pain associated with inflammation.

In October 2016, Spotlight Innovation obtained an exclusive license from Indiana University Research and Technology Corp to commercialize an orally available small molecule named STL-182 with potential therapeutic potential for the treatment of spinal muscular atrophy. Early preclinical testing of STL-182 was accomplished by Dr. Elliot Androphy of Indiana University School of Medicine and Professor Kevin Hodgetts of Brigham and Women's Hospital.

In November 2016, Celtic Biotech Ltd received approval from the French National Agency for the Safety of Medicines and Health Products to commence Part 2 of the Phase 1 dose escalation safety study Crotoxin in Patients with Advanced Cancer using an Intravenous Route of Administration.

In December 2016, Spotlight Innovation announced the formation of a Scientific Advisory Board. The board includes Professor Hengli Tang of Florida State University, Dr. Elliot Androphy of Indiana University School of Medicine and Professor Kevin Hodgetts of Brigham and Women's Hospital.

In June 2017, Spotlight Innovation entered into a sponsored research agreement with Brigham and Women's Hospital in support of research conducted by Professor Kevin Hodgetts, Ph.D., intended to develop drugs for the treatment of spinal muscular atrophy.

In August 2017, Spotlight Innovation announced that its subsidiary Caretta Therapeutics had developed its first commercially available over-the-counter analgesic product for the treatment of chronic pain but the product was never launched.

In August 2017, Spotlight Innovation entered into a sponsored research agreement with Indiana University in support of research conducted by Dr. Elliot Androphy intended to develop drugs for the treatment of spinal muscular atrophy.

== Subsidiaries ==
Spotlight Innovation seeks out partnerships and acquisition possibilities with companies developing medical technologies in fields like pharmaceuticals, devices and equipment, and diagnostic products. Currently, Spotlight Innovation has two subsidiary companies: Celtic Biotech Iowa, Inc. and Caretta Therapeutics, LLC.. Celtic Biotech Ltd is no longer associated with Spotlight Innovation or its subsidiary, Celtic Biotech Iowa.

=== Celtic Biotech Iowa, Inc. ===
Celtic Biotech Iowa's subsidiary, Celtic Biotech LTD, was founded in Dublin, Ireland in 2003 by brothers John Reid and Dr. Paul Reid (the latter of whom serves as the president of Celtic Biotech). Celtic Biotech made headlines in 2011 when they announced a clinical trial to test the effectiveness of Crotoxin, a protein found in South American rattlesnake venom, that could cause cell death in malignant cancer cells. Crotoxin was tested on patients in the George Pompidou University Hospital in Paris.

In 2014, Celtic Biotech LTD entered into a share exchange agreement with Spotlight Innovation's wholly owned subsidiary, Celtic Biotech Iowa, Inc. Celtic Biotech LTD also became a subsidiary of Celtic Biotech Iowa. Since then, Celtic Biotech Iowa has produced the commercial product, EPISORB, a topical gel formulated to deliver drugs transdermally. The company also licensed a cardiotoxin therapy for acute and chronic nephropathy in 2015. In January, 2015, Celtic Biotech Iowa was granted a patent by the U.S. Patent and Trademark Office entitled Crotoxin Administration for Cancer Treatment and Pain Relief. In July 2015, the company entered into a research agreement with Atlanta-based Emory University to study the viability of the cell-penetrating peptide Crotamine—a protein found in the venom of the South American rattlesnake, crotalus durissus terrificus—as a radiopharmaceutical for imaging lung cancer tumors with Positron Emission Tomography (PET). In Sept. 2018 the Directors of Celtic Biotech Ltd rescinded its share exchange agreement with Spotlight Innovation for just cause. Celtic Biotech Iowa, Inc. was later listed as inactive by the Iowa Secretary of State in September 2022.

=== Caretta Therapeutics, LLC ===
Spotlight Innovation's subsidiary Caretta Therapeutics was founded in 2016. The subsidiary entered into a licensing agreement with Dr. Paul Reid for rights to develop and commercialize analgesic products for the treatment of chronic pain utilizing active ingredient cobra venom. In August 2017, Caretta Therapeutics began the manufacture of its first product, Venodol roll-on, under the licensing agreement but sales were not undertaken.
