= Ryukakusan Co. =

Japanese pharmaceutical company

Coordinates: 35.6954532°N 139.7802246°E

Ryukakusan Co., Ltd.

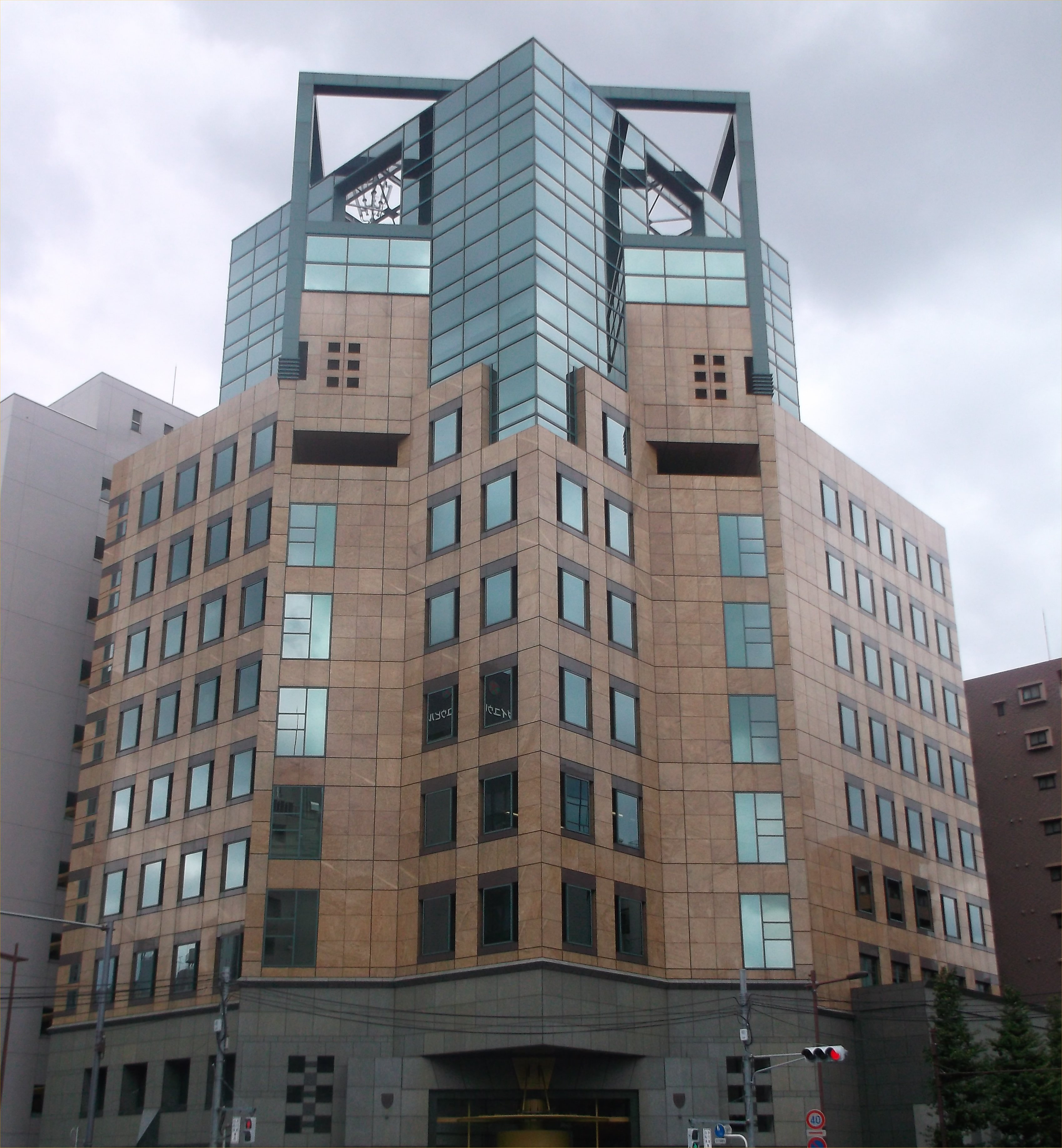
- Headquarters
- Native name: 株式会社 龍角散
- Company type: Public KK
- Industry: Pharmaceuticals
- Founded: 1871; 155 years ago
- Headquarters: Higashi-Kanda, Chiyoda, Tokyo101-0031, Japan
- Key people: Ryuta Fujii (President and CEO)
- Products: Ryukakusan and other throat products
- Website: Official website

Ryukakusan Co., Ltd. (株式会社 龍角散, Kabushiki-gaisha Ryukakusan) is a Tokyo-based Japanese pharmaceutical company that develops and markets prescription and over-the-counter drug (OTC) products, especially throat and swallowing products.

== History ==
In the early 18th century, "Ryukakusan" was a powdered Kampo cough medicine produced by the Fuji family, physicians to the Satake Clan of the Akita Domain. Literally "dragon antler powder", it was named after its ingredients: long gu ("dragon bone"), deer antler powder, and borneol. Shoteiji Fujii began selling it as medicine for the public in 1871. In 1894, his son Tokusaburo revised the formula, introducing the now-familiar herbal formulation in fine powder form.

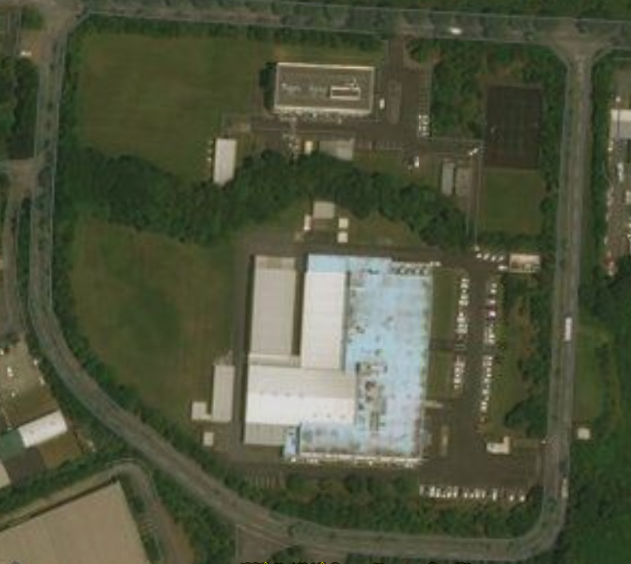
Chiba factory

In 1995, the company had a ¥4 billion debt. They recovered from this by selling the Iatron Laboratory to Mitsubishi in 2002.

Ryukakusan's products are popular in China and Taiwan. Tourists buy their products in bulk, to bring home, when they travel to Japan.

=== China ===
Ryukakusan exploded in popularity in China in 2015 after a post named it as a "miraculous drug" for relief from sore throat caused by air pollution. In 2016, a Chinese person was arrested in Japan for suspicion of illegally purchasing the drug for resale. In 2017, Taobao delisted a number of Japanese drugs, including Ryukakusan, for not having proper authorization. In 2019, a copycat product Ryu-no-san appeared in China.

== Products ==
- Ryukakusan (herbal powder, class III OTC in Japan)
- Ryukakusan Direct (herbal powder and herbal troche for direct oral use without water, class III OTC in Japan)
- Ryukakusan Throat Refreshers (herbal lozenge, regular food in Japan)
- Swallowing Aid Jelly (herbal jelly, regular food in Japan)
