= Cheng Fong Chemical =

Chinese active pharmaceutical ingredient company

Cheng Fong Chemical Co. Ltd is a Chinese active pharmaceutical ingredient (API) company that exports to the United States of America. In September 2016, the US FDA issued a warning letter "following a five-day inspection in April 2016 that found the company failed to appropriately maintain its facilities and investigate reports of foreign particles in finished batches." According to the FDA, Cheng Fong officials told investigators "that the rooms had never been cleaned."
