= PainCeptor Pharma =

PainCeptor Pharma Corp.
- Company type: Private
- Industry: Pharmaceutical
- Predecessor: Antalium and NeuroCeptor through merger
- Founded: 2004; 22 years ago
- Headquarters: Montreal, Quebec, Canada
- Key people: Louis Lamontagne (President, 2004- )
- Number of employees: 45 (2007)

PainCeptor Pharma is a private Canadian company focused on the development of drugs that act outside the central nervous system on nociceptors to treat pain. The company was established in 2004 through the merger of two academic spinout firms: Antalium from McGill University and NeuroCeptor from Queens University. At its inception, the company's primary operations were in Montreal and Kingston, and it established a partnership with the Danish company NeuroSearch as part of its birth.

== About PainCeptor ==
The company's strategic focus was on peripheral rather than central-acting therapeutics is an attempt to avoid the known side effects of existing central-acting agents. The primary molecular targets addressed by PainCeptor are members of the ASIC ion channel family and nerve growth factor (NGF) and NGF receptors. In 2006, the company secured funding from the Canadian Industrial Research Assistance Program. In 2007, the company raised C$24.4 million in venture capital funding in anticipation of starting first-in-man clinical trials that year; an initial round of funding had been secured in 2004 in the amount of C$23 million. As of 2007, the company conducted research out of the Steacie Institute for Molecular Sciences, a facility of Canada's National Research Council located in Ottawa, Quebec.

Although PainCeptor refers to itself as a biopharmaceutical company on its website, its two primary publicly reported drug discovery projects aim to deliver small molecule therapeutics. According to AdisInsight, a drug information platform published by Springer Nature, the small-molecule antagonists program discontinued in 2009; while development of a separate drug, PPC-5650 (an ASIC channel antagonist) had been discontinued by 2016.

== Intellectual property ==
According to one source, in 2006 the company was granted patent protection on antagonists of each of these receptor types. Inspection of the patent applications, though, shows that no patents were, in fact, granted. In regard to US2005282840A1 "Methods of modulating neurotrophin-mediated activity", the application status was revised to 'abandoned' in 2009; a second patent application, US2007123514A1, bearing the same title has also been noted to be 'abandoned' as of 2010. Likewise, in regard to US2008004282A1 "Compositions and methods for modulating gated ion channels", the application status was revised to 'abandoned' in 2010. Still another patent application was 'abandoned' in 2011, US2009082368A1 "Methods of Modulating Neurotrophin-mediated Activity". One patent was actually granted to the firm, US2007191418A1 "Compositions and methods for modulating gated ion channels", in 2007; this patent transferred ownership to Aros Pharma in 2010, who subsequently did not keep up payment of maintenance fees, resulting in the status changing to 'lapsed' in 2018.
