= Kangmei Pharmaceutical =

Pharmaceutical company based in Guangdong

Kangmei Pharmaceutical Co., Ltd
- Trade name: Kangmei Pharmaceutical
- Native name: 广东康美药业股份有限公司
- Company type: Public company
- Traded as: SSE: 600518
- Industry: Pharmaceutical
- Founded: 1997 in Puning, Jieyang, Guangdong
- Founder: Ma Xingtian
- Headquarters: Puning, Shenzhen, China
- Number of locations: 30 branches nationwide
- Area served: China
- Key people: Ma Xingtian (Founder, former actual controller)
- Products: Medication, ingredients for medication, health foods, medical equipment
- Brands: Ganmaoling Granule, Qingkailing Capsules
- Services: Property management
- Number of employees: 10,000

Kangmei Pharmaceutical Co., Ltd (Chinese: 广东康美药业股份有限公司; pinyin: Guǎngdōng Kāngměi Yàoyè Gǔfèn Yǒuxiàn Gōngsī; abbreviated 康美药业; Kāngměi Yàoyè) is a large pharmaceutical company based in Guangdong with headquarters in Puning and Shenzhen. Kangmei Pharmaceutical produces medication and medical equipment, with a focus on traditional Chinese medicine. It is traded on the Shanghai Stock Exchange and had a market capitalization of more than 47 billion RMB in 2019.

In 2019, Kangmei became embroiled in scandal when it disclosed that it had made false statements in past financial reports. The company and several of its employees were penalized by regulators, and the incident raised broader questions about financial regulation in China.

== Products and services ==
Kangmei Pharmaceutical manufactures and distributes medication, ingredients for medication, health foods, and medical equipment. Its main focus is on traditional Chinese medicine. Its products include American ginseng, angelica, clarithromycin, doxazosin mesylate, honeysuckle, notoginseng, paracetamol and pseudoephedrine hydrochloride, propiverine hydrochloride, radix codonopsis, and salvia.

The company also does property management.

Kangmei Pharmaceutica has a strong focus on the domestic market, with a presence in all provinces of China - more than 30 branches nationwide and over 10,000 employees.

The company's popular products include "Ganmaoling Granule", a traditional Chinese medicine for treating colds and flu, which has been in production for over 30 years. As well as dietary supplements "Qingkailing Capsules", designed to strengthen the immune system.

Another important direction of the company is the development of methods for treating various types of cancer. Kangmei has brought to the market several drugs for the treatment of lung cancer, breast cancer and other tumours.

== History ==
In 1997, entrepreneur Ma Xingtian founded Kangmei Pharmaceutical in Puning, Jieyang, Guangdong. The company began the process of demutualization in 2000, and it was listed on the Shanghai Stock Exchange (ticker 600518) in an initial public offering in March 2001. The company has undergone share-trading reform.

In 2019, Kangmei almost defaulted on bonds. Media sources reported that it was rescued by the Guangzhou city government.

== 2016–2019 financial scandal ==
In 2019 Kangmei became involved in a scandal relating to its financial reports. The Financial Times called the incident "one of China's biggest accounting scandals in recent memory", while the South China Morning Post said it was "one of China's largest financial frauds". According to the China Securities Regulatory Commission (CSRC), the company overstated its revenue by 29 billion RMB, overstated its profits by 4.1 billion RMB, and overstated its cash holdings by 88.7 billion RMB. The incident led to concerns about China's reputation among international investors as well as questions about the adequacy of the country's financial regulation.

In late 2018, Kangmei Pharmaceutical announced that it was under investigation for possible disclosure violations. The CSRC noticed that the company was earning unusually little interest on its reported cash holdings, and on 29 April 2019, the company announced that its 2017 annual report had overstated the company's cash holdings by 29.9 billion RMB. The company also revised its 2017 operating revenue to 8.9 billion RMB less than previously reported. Following the announcement, Kangmei's shares on the Shanghai Stock Exchange fell by 10%, and trading was halted as they reached the maximum daily price move.

The company initially said that the incorrect disclosure was due to an "accounting error". On 29 May 2019 it said that faked documents were involved; this announcement caused its stock price to fall by the maximum daily price move again (at this time the limit was 5%, as the company had been moved to risk-alert status by the exchange). By this point its shares had dropped by more than 60% since the accounting problems were first disclosed.

On 17 May 2019, the CSRC's preliminary investigation found that the 2017 financial report was materially false; the company was to be placed under Special Treatment (a formal warning that its stock could be delisted) on 21 May. On 16 August, the Securities Regulatory Commission completed its investigation, saying that Kangmei Pharmaceutical had committed "premeditated and malicious cheating of investors", and imposed administrative penalties on the company and 22 individuals as well as banning six parties from accessing the securities market. Earlier in the year, the company had been fined 600,000 RMB, and several employees were fined amounts ranging from 100,000 to 900,000 RMB. The penalties were described as "a slap-on-the-wrist fine" in the South China Morning Post, and Kangmei's share prices rose by 17.3% over the next week, hitting the maximum daily limit of 5% four times along the way.

At the time of the scandal, Kangmei Pharmaceutical was included in MSCI's emerging markets index. The incident drew attention to the risks foreign investors might face when investing in funds that track the index, especially given the increasing weighting of Chinese companies in the index. Following the incident, MSCI removed Kangmei Pharmaceutical from the index in June 2019.

Additional penalties and litigation followed. In July 2020, Kangmei's actual controller Ma Xingtian was detained by police in connection with the fraud; in November 2021 he was sentenced to 12 years in prison and fined ¥1.2 million. Also in July 2020, the CSRC temporarily banned GF Securities, which sponsored Kangmei's IPO, from sponsorship and bond underwriting due to its role in the scandal. On 16 April 2021, the government-affiliated China Securities Investor Service Center sued Kangmei Pharmaceutical for financial fraud in a class-action lawsuit on behalf of more than 50 investors. On 22 April 2021, Jiedong Rural Commercial Bank, one of Kangmei's creditors, sued the company for bankruptcy following huge losses in 2020. On 12 November 2021, Guangzhou Intermediate People's Court ordered Kangmei to compensate investors for losses of ¥2.459 billion., and five of the company's independent directors, Guo Chonghui (郭崇慧), Zhang Ping (张平), Jiang Zhenping (江镇平), Li Ding'an (李定安), and Zhang Hong (张弘) were ordered to assume 5–10% joint liability. The ruling caused a wave of resignations among independent directors at listed companies in China.
