= Kunming Pharmaceutical Corporation =

Chinese pharmaceutical company

Kunming Pharmaceutical Corp. is a company that is involved in the manufacture and sale of natural drugs, as well as the wholesale and retail of other drugs. It is the largest pharmaceutical enterprise in Yunnan.

As of December 31, 2007, the company had five major subsidiaries and associates. Headquartered in Kunming, Yunnan Province, China, the Company distributes its products in domestic market and to overseas markets.

== Products ==
The company offers its major products under three categories: Artemether series, consisting of artemether injections, capsules, and tablets for the treatment of subtertian malaria; Sanqi series, for the treatment of cardiovascular and cerebrovascular diseases, and Gastrodine series, for the treatment of headache and neuralgia.
