= Smith Drug Company =

American wholesale drug company

- Company type: Private
- Industry: Pharmaceuticals and pharmacy services
- Founded: 1944
- Headquarters: Spartanburg, South Carolina, U.S.
- Key people: Wade Lewis (President)
- Website: smithdrug.com

Smith Drug Company is a Spartanburg, South Carolina based drug wholesale company and a division of J M Smith Corporation. The company was founded in 1943 with annual revenue in excess of $2.5 Billion as of 2013.

The company specializes in wholesale pharmaceutical distribution, home medical equipment and other medical products. Although it services long-term care pharmacies and regional hospitals as well, the company has been serving independent pharmacies for over 75 years.

== History ==
In 1925, J.M. Smith Sr., R.Ph., founded Smith Drug Company as an independent pharmacy in Asheville, North Carolina. As the changing economy of the 1940s, rigors of contestant travel and shortages imposed by World War II began to take their toll, J.M. Smith began divesting his retail chain of drug stores and incorporated Smith Drug Company in 1943. The wholesale drug operation began in the attic of the original Smith Drug Store in Spartanburg, South Carolina and now manages three large distribution centers across the southeastern United States.

== Facilities ==
In addition to its national headquarters located in Spartanburg, South Carolina, Smith Drug Company maintains additional distribution centers and offices in Paragould, Arkansas; Valdosta, Georgia; Carey, Ohio; and Milton, Vermont.

== Key programs and services ==
- HealthWise Pharmacy - Advertising program.
- HME - Home Medical Equipment.

== Continuing education and trade show ==
Since 1996, Smith Drug Company's Continuing Education program has grown into a large attraction at the company's annual Trade Show, where it gives manufacturers, vendors and customers a place to meet.

== Other divisions ==
- RxMedic Systems
