= Romat =

Kazakhstani pharmaceutical company

- Type: Private
- Industry: Pharmaceutical industry
- Founded: 1992
- Headquarters: Pavlodar, Kazakhstan
- Key people: Turarbek Rakish
- Products: Pharmaceuticals and generic medication.
- Number of employees: more than 1200 (2010)
- Website: Romat

Romat (Russian: Ромат) was a pharmaceutical company and Kazakhstan's leading pharmaceutical brand.

"Romat" was a pharmaceutical holding, uniting 3 modern plants for the manufacture of bio-products and polymeric medical products.

The research and development department of "Romat" was working on tuberculous medicines and other products.

The company possessed a national distribution network with branches in 18 cities of Kazakhstan and in China and a retail network of 30 pharmacies in 5 cities of Kazakhstan. Current staff size exceeds 1200 people. The main activities of “Romat” are manufacturing and sale of medical products, personal hygiene products, children's nutrition and syringes.

The company was declared bankrupt in 2016.
