= CoCo Therapeutics =

UK-based biotechnology company

- Industry: Pharmaceutical industry
- Founded: United Kingdom (2013)
- Headquarters: United Kingdom
- Website: cocotherapeutics.com

CoCo Therapeutics is a United Kingdom-based biotechnology company formed in 2013 jointly by King's College London, the Wellcome Trust and Advent Venture Partners. The company will focus on development of therapeutics for Alzheimer's disease which target retinoic acid receptor alpha, specifically building on work originating in the Neuroscience Drug Discovery Unit of King's College, led by Jonathan Corcoran. This work was funded through the Wellcome Trust's Seeding Drug Discovery Initiative.
