= Hebei Yuxing Bio-Engineering Co. Ltd =

Chinese pharmaceutical company

Hebei Yuxing Bio-Engineering Co. Ltd is a Chinese active pharmaceutical ingredient (API) company that exports to the United States of America. Recently, the US FDA issued a warning letter due to "evidence that the company was keeping incomplete documentation and did not adequately investigate instances of microbial contamination."
