= Synthaverse =

Polish pharmaceutical company

SYNTHAVERSE S.A.
- Type: Spółka Akcyjna
- Traded as: WSE: BML
- Industry: Biotechnology, Pharmaceutical
- Founded: 1944
- Headquarters: Lublin, Poland
- Key people: Piotr Fic (interim CEO) Jarosław Błaszczak (Chairman of the Supervisory Board)
- Number of employees: 230 (2019)
- Website: https://synthaverse.com/pl/

Synthaverse S.A., formerly known as Biomed-Lublin Wytwórnia Surowic i Szczepionek (Biomed-Lublin Serum and Vaccine Production Plant) is a Polish pharmaceutical company operating since 1944. The company manufactures medicinal preparations (prescription drugs, medical devices and laboratory reagents used in biochemical and medical laboratories). The company's headquarters is in Lublin, (Poland).

== History ==
The history of the company go back to 1944, when the Laboratory for the Production of Vaccines against Typhus was opened at the National Institute of Hygiene in Lublin (later the Rudolf Weigl production facility of vaccine against typhus), and shortly after that, the Serum and Vaccines factory. Initially, vaccines against rabies, dysentery and typhoid, and Delbet's nonspecific stimulative vaccine, anti-diphtheritic and antitetanic sera. In 1951, both plants merged to form Lubelska Wytwórnia Surowic i Szczepionek. In the years 1951–1960, the company significantly developed, increased employment, expanded its production departments and expanded its product range.

In 1959, the company began producing the Polio vaccine against Heine-Medin disease and began producing a bacterial preparation called Lakcid. In 1960 it was renamed “Wytwórnia Surowic i Szczepionek w Lublinie” [the factory of serum and vaccines in Lublin]. The 60s of the twentieth century is the period of research and development on, inter alia, obtaining a polyvalent vaccine against influenza viruses "Picorna".

In 1976, the plant was reorganized: four production departments were established: the Faculty of Vaccines, Chemistry and Auxiliary Production, the Faculty of Virology, the Faculty of Serum and Laboratory Animals, the Faculty of Protein Fractions and Organopreparations. As a result of these activities, the company started introducing new technologies, modernizing devices and expanding the product range. At the end of the 1990s, the Biomed plant was privatized, which resulted in the establishment of a company called "Biomed" Wytwórnia Surowic i Szczepionek Sp. z o.o. in Lublin (“Biomed” Serum and Vaccine Production Plant PLC in Lublin). In connection with entering the stock exchange, it was transformed into a joint stock company in December 2010. The company was listed from July 2011 on the NewConnect market. On January 30, 2015, Biomed-Lublin made its debut on the main market of the Warsaw Stock Exchange.

Currently, the company deals with the production of medicinal preparations, medical devices and laboratory reagents (used in biochemical and medical laboratories).

In August 2020, Biomed-Lublin started the production of anti-SARS-CoV-2 immunoglobulin from the plasma of convalescents for the purposes of clinical trials. On September 23, the first stage of production of this preparation was completed.

In July 2023, Biomed-Lublin officially rebranded to Synthaverse S.A. to reflect its new strategic direction, which includes combining different scientific ideas and approaches to develop pharmaceutical technologies.

== Products ==
- BCG vaccine (contains the Brazilian substrain M. bovis BCG Moreau)
- Biotrombina
- Onko BCG
- Gastrotrombina
- Distreptaza
- Histaglobulina
- Gamma anty-D
- Gamma anty HBs
- Lakcid
