= Bluepharma =

Portuguese pharmaceutical company

Bluepharma logo

Bluepharma (full name Bluepharma — Indústria Farmacêutica, SA) is a pharmaceutical company of Portuguese ownership, which is located in Coimbra, Portugal. Bluepharma became FDA approved in 2009 for the development of solid pharmaceutical forms, and was the first Portuguese pharmaceutical company to export to the US market.

Paulo Barradas Rebelo is chairman of Bluepharma Group.

== History ==
Bluepharma's production plant was acquired from Bayer AG when, at the end of the 1990s, the German multinational company made a business decision to consolidate production at its headquarters in Germany. Bayer announced plans to sell the Coimbra manufacturing site by advertising in an international magazine. Paulo Barradas Rebelo, who had gained management and business skills and experience in logistics from a background as chief executive officer of a major wholesaler and distribution company to about 500 pharmacy units within a co-operative, read about the planned sale. He contacted Sérgio Simões, who worked in research locally as a professor at the University of Coimbra. The two men, with Isolina Mesquita who was plant manager for Bayer's Coimbra site, decided they would set up a new company, Bluepharma, with the aim of acquiring the Bayer plant and developing it as an integrated contract manufacturing business. The new company took the responsibility for all former Bayer employees, so the German work culture is still present in Bluepharma.

Its buildings occupy about 14,000 square meters (150,000 sq ft) at several levels on a land area of 18,700 square meters (201,000 sq ft). The buildings have had several improvements, the most significant being in 1989, when the site was still owned by Bayer, and in 1998. During the first half of the 2000s, the company built a laboratory between the two main buildings to do more research and development work.

== Business ==
Bluepharma develops its activity on the following areas:

- Contract-manufacturing
- Biopharmaceuticals
- R&D
- Commerce of generics in Portugal

Bluepharma has clients in Portugal, France, Germany and in the UK, among others. One of Bluepharma's main clients is Bayer, to which the Portuguese company produced around 3.5 million units in 2004. Other clients include pharmaceuticals brands and companies such as Teva, Ivax, Arrow, EG LABO (Stada), Bexal (Hexal), Mepha (Ratiopharm) and Ciclum (Grünenthal).

Most Bluepharma's employees have academic degrees, and many have post-graduate degrees (M.Sc. and PhDs) as well.

== Research & Development ==
In the R&D area, Bluepharma has research projects in the biotechnology field and is developing generic.
