= Cel-Sci Corporation =

- Type: Public
- Traded as: AMEX: CVM
- Industry: Biotechnology
- Founded: 1983
- Founder: Maximilian de Clara
- Headquarters: Vienna, Virginia, United States
- Key people: Geert Kersten, CEO
- Products: Multikine, LEAPS, HGP-30
- Revenue: US$559,000 (2020)
- Operating income: US$−20 million (2019)
- Net income: US$−22 million (2019)
- Website: https://cel-sci.com/

Cel-Sci Corporation (NYSE American: CVM), is a biotechnology company that tests drugs for the treatment of cancer, autoimmune and infectious diseases through the research and development of immunotherapy products.

Cel-Sci's main product is the drug Multikine, an immunotherapeutic agent designed to fight cancer by stimulating the body's immune system. Multikine is currently in Phase III of Clinical Trials with the Food and Drug Administration (FDA). Multikine has also been referred to as Leukocyte Interleukin Injection (LI). Multikine was in Phase II testing of patients with head and neck cancer in the early 2000s, in which it demonstrated tumor-reducing ability. In January 2007, the US cleared the Phase 3 trial and Multikine was designated as an orphan drug by the FDA for neoadjuvant therapy of patients with squamous cell carcinoma of the head and neck. A total of 928 patients were enrolled in the head and neck cancer drug trial at that time. Subsequently, in June 2021, the company announced that the study missed its primary endpoint.

== History ==
Cel-Sci Corporation was founded in 1983 in Germany by Maximilian de Clara of Switzerland, who was also the president of the company until his resignation in 2016. Geert Kersten, de Clara's stepson, has been the company's CEO since 1995. The company went public in the year of its founding. The investment firm that took the company public later folded.

The company's United States research and development operations were based in Baltimore, Maryland in the mid-1990s.

In May 1992, the U.S. Securities and Exchange Commission issued a cease and desist order against the company's then-President, Maximilian de Clara. This order stated that from August 1988 through June 1991, de Clara was 2–31 weeks late to file 16 forms documenting his sales of over $2.6 million of Cel-Sci stock.

CEO Geert Kersten confirmed that Cel-Sci paid an analyst from the brokerage firm of Honolulu Securities Inc. to write a research report on the company's stock, though the analyst claimed that being paid did not affect the conclusion that Cel-Sci's stock was undervalued.

In 1997, Cel-Sci bought a technology which enabled regulation of immune system responses that they had been licensing from the Dutch company Sittona.

=== Mysterious cash offer ===
The New York Times reported that in 1999, Cel-Sci received an unsolicited cash offer of $124 million from an unidentified person in Argentina.

=== Arbitration victory ===
In 2018, Cel-Sci won a 4.5-year-long arbitration suit filed in October 2013 against CRO InVentiv Health for breach of contract. The arbitrator awarded Cel-Sci $2.9 million in damages because the CRO failed to enroll the required number of patients over a period of 2 years, thus delaying the clinical development of Multikine. Later, the FDA lifted their clinical hold imposed on Cel-Sci in August 2017. This allowed the company to advance to Phase III of their head and neck cancer study.

=== 2020 trading halt ===
On February 26, 2020, Cel-Sci's stock dropped 42.4% before a trading halt was issued for news pending. The company then released a letter to shareholders concerning the Phase III trial.

=== Multikine stage 3 study results ===
On June 28, 2021, Cel-Sci announced that the study missed its primary endpoint as the higher risk subgroup did not achieve a 10% improvement in overall survival even though the lower risk subgroup did. Kersten declared that the company would apply for FDA approval of the drug despite the study's missed endpoint. Following the announcement, Cel-Sci's stock lost between 40-50% of its value in one day as trading was halted at least 3 times.

== Other products ==
Cel-Sci has also worked on LEAPS (Ligand Epitope Antigen Presentation System), a system of therapeutic vaccines for rheumatoid arthritis.

The company is also testing HGP-30 to determine if it is an effective treatment against the AIDS virus. In 1996, The Washington Post reported that the company was conducting its testing without the backing of the FDA because they couldn't agree on study details with said regulatory organization. Analysts were quoted as stating that this decision could cause the company delays in the event that it has to redo its research to meet FDA standards.
