= GlobeImmune =

GlobeImmune, Inc.
- Type: Public
- Traded as: Nasdaq: GBIM
- Industry: Biotechnology
- Founded: January 1, 1995; 31 years ago
- Headquarters: Louisville, Colorado, United States
- Number of employees: 22 (Dec 2014)
- Website: globeimmune.com

GlobeImmune, Inc. is a clinical-stage public biopharmaceutical company headquartered in Louisville, Colorado, that develops therapeutic vaccines to treat cancer and infectious diseases. As of August 2014, the company had no marketed products. GlobeImmune’s therapeutic vaccines are developed on the company’s Tarmogen immunotherapy platform. Tarmogens are made from genetically modified yeast that express one or more disease-associated antigens. Tarmogens activate T cells to specifically target and eliminate diseased cells with the same target antigen.

Tarmogen platform

The company has partnerships with Celgene (established in 2009) and the National Cancer Institute for the development of cancer vaccines. Their collaboration with Gilead for the development of therapeutic vaccines for the treatment of hepatitis B was terminated in November 2016 after the product they were developing failed a clinical trial the year before.

With respect to financing in the absence of revenue, the company raised US$17,500,000 through a Series E Preferred Stock offering in January 2010.

As of August 2015, GlobeImmune had two therapeutic vaccines in clinical trials, GI-6207 and GI-6301, for the treatment of various cancers. Completed trials have addressed two other candidates, GI-4000 (the company's lead oncology candidate as of 2010) and GI-5005. Despite there being three ongoing trials, in July 2015 the company announced it would eliminate "most of its workforce positions" shortly following the failure of a trial examining GI-4774.

In March 2017, GlobeImmune announced that it has entered into a definitive purchase agreement for the sale of shares of its common stock to NantCell, Inc.
