= Avella Specialty Pharmacy =

Pharmaceutical specialty company

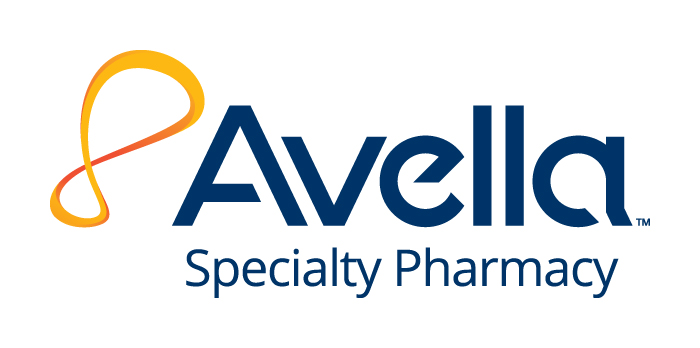
- Industry: Specialty pharmaceuticals
- Founded: 1996
- Founder: John Musil
- Headquarters: USA
- Key people: Rebecca Shanahan, CEO
- Website: www.avella.com

Avella Specialty Pharmacy, formerly known as The Apothecary Shops, is an American specialty pharmacy company. Avella is headquartered in Phoenix, Arizona, and has facilities in eight states. Dr. John D. Musil is the company's founder. Rebecca Shanahan is the CEO.

Avella supplies drug therapies in the medical fields of oncology, dermatology, fertility, urology, ophthalmology, gastroenterology, and rheumatology. It offers drugs that treat complex diseases such as cancer, oncology, HIV/AIDS, infertility, multiple sclerosis, Crohn's disease, and hepatitis. Avella also offers "specialty care coordinators" who provide counseling and assistance to customers. Avella technologies include a mobile application for medication refills and reminders, as well as a provider portal which gives physicians patient health data.

== History ==
John Musil, a practicing pharmacist, founded Avella Specialty Pharmacy (formerly The Apothecary Shops) in Scottsdale, Arizona in 1996. Avella has been on the Inc. 5000 list since 2007. By 2009, Avella had sixteen physical locations, a call center, and a national distribution facility.

In January 2014, Avella Specialty Pharmacy named Rebecca Shanahan as its new CEO. That same year, Avella became a registered Outsourcing Facility through the U.S. Food and Drug Administration. In March 2015, Avella was approved to register a .pharmacy domain name which identifies safe and legal pharmacies online. That same month, Avella partnered with Sentry Data Systems, a technology systems producer for hospitals and clinics, to extend coverage of entities participating in the 340B drug discount program. In 2015, Inc. named Avella to the Inc. 5000 list for the ninth time.
