= Hanhong Pharmaceutical Technology =

Chinese drug manufacturer

- Industry: Pharmacy, retail (drugs)
- Founded: 2012
- Headquarters: Wuhan, Hubei 430000
- Key people: Du Changgen (杜长根) (Owner)

Hanhong Pharmaceutical Technology Co. is a Chinese drug manufacturer. The company, its owner Du Changgen and some of its employees are indicted by the United States Justice Department for crimes relating to fentanyl, xylazine and methamphetamine production, distribution of synthetic opioids, and sales resulting from precursor chemicals. The indictments accuses Hanhong of exporting large quantities of fentanyl precursors and non-opioid additives like xylazine, to drug traffickers in Mexico (including to the Sinaloa Cartel) and the United States. Its owner Du Changgen is the head of the Du Transnational Criminal Organization, which is listed on the United States Attorney General’s Consolidated Priority Organization Target (CPOT) list, which according to the DEA is a list of the leaders of the most prolific drug trafficking and money laundering organizations, having the greatest impact on the United States illicit drug supply.

== History and structure ==
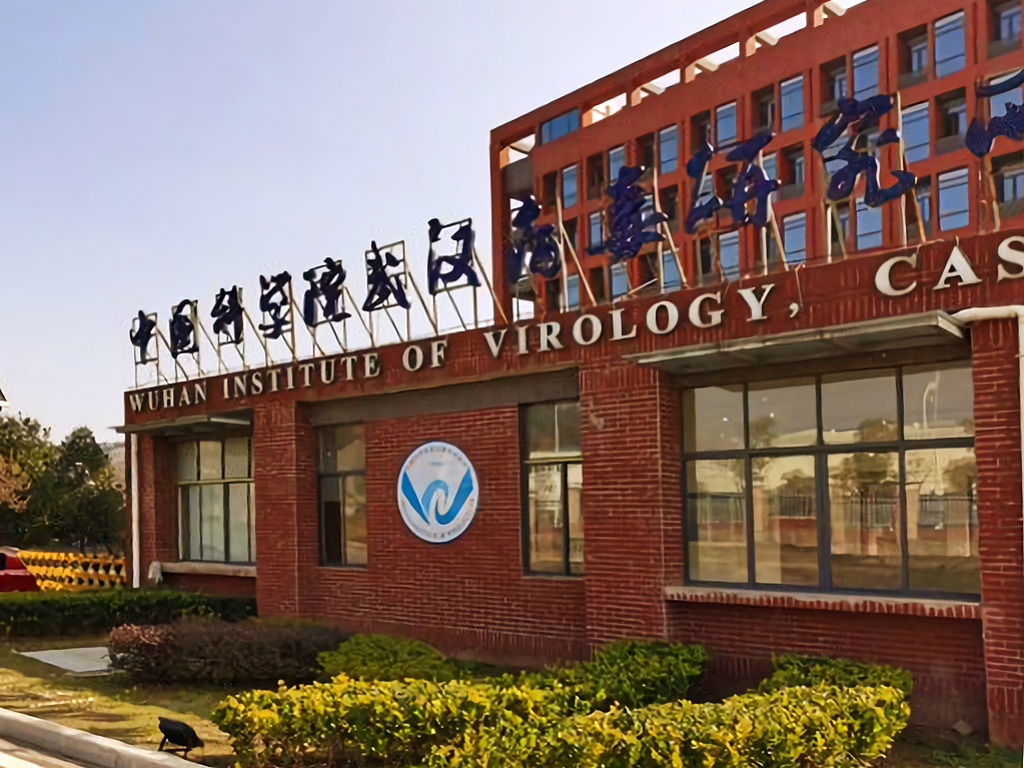
Hanhong claims association with the Wuhan Institute of Virology

Hanhong was founded in 2012. The company claims it has "long-term cooperation with Wuhan Institute of Virology and other universities". The company claims it has "two pilot production sites, mainly engaged in the production of bulk drugs, pharmaceutical intermediates, and customized special chemicals".

It was known as Hanhong Medicine Technology Hubei Co., Ltd. (翰弘醫藥科技湖北有限公司). However, it is unclear when the name was changed; sources say 2002 where others say 2006 It could also be that it was called this initially in 2012, and then the name changed in 2016.

As of 2023, Hanhong Pharmaceutical advertised "the sale of fentanyl precursors to Mexican customers". As of 2023, owner Du Changgen (杜长根) and sales representatives Gan Xuebi, Song Xueqin, and Yang Qi were sanctioned by the United States government. In October 2023, Hanhong Pharmaceutical Technology and its employees are indicted by the United States Justice Department for crimes relating to fentanyl, xylazine and methamphetamine production, distribution of synthetic opioids, and sales resulting from precursor chemicals.

According indictments unsealed in the District Court for the Southern District of Florida:

Hanhong Medicine Technology Company, a pharmaceutical company located in Wuhan, Hubei Province, China, was charged in a four-count indictment, along with Chinese nationals Changgen Du, 30, and Xuebi Gan, 28. According to the indictment, Hanhong has exported large quantities of fentanyl precursors and non-opioid additives, like xylazine, to the United States and Mexico, including to a drug trafficker in Pennsylvania and to a drug trafficker in the Sinaloa cartel for the manufacture of fentanyl in Mexico for eventual distribution in the United States. Xylazine is often mixed with fentanyl to increase the effects of the drug for users. Xylazine is a non-opioid drug approved for veterinary use for purposes of sedation, anesthesia, muscle relaxation, and pain relief in horses, cattle, and other animals. It is not approved for human use. Many opioid users are unaware they are taking xylazine. Overdose deaths involving xylazine have steadily increased year over year. Drug users who inject xylazine, or drug mixtures containing xylazine, often develop necrotic tissue resulting in disfiguring wounds or amputation.

The Du Transnational Criminal Organization is listed on the United States Attorney General’s Consolidated Priority Organization Target (CPOT) list. The CPOT list identifies the most significant transnational criminal organizations presenting a priority threat to the United States, including those international drug and money laundering organizations affecting the illicit drug supply of the United States. The CPOT list identifies those criminal organizations by the name(s) of their leaders. Du, as the criminal organization’s leader, is the director of Hanhong and allegedly negotiates sales with customers. Gan is an alleged sales representative. Du and Gan each operated a cryptocurrency wallet that accepted payment for Hanhong’s sales. The four-count indictment charges Hanhong, Du, and Gan with conspiracy to manufacture and distribute fentanyl; conspiracy to manufacture and distribute a fentanyl precursor with intent to unlawfully import it into the U.S.; manufacturing and distributing a fentanyl precursor with intent to unlawfully import it into the U.S.; and conspiracy to commit money laundering."
