= Nereus Pharmaceuticals =

American pharmaceutical company

- Type: Private
- Industry: Pharmaceuticals
- Founded: San Diego, California, United States (1988)
- Founder: Michael A. Palladino, Kobi M. Sethna, Stan Fleming, William Fenical
- Headquarters: San Diego, California, United States
- Key people: Michael A. Palladino Ph.D.(Scientific Co-founder, SVP and Chief Technology Officer) Kobi M. Sethna (President, CEO); Gary Shearman (Chairman of the Board); G.
- Number of employees: 36
- Website: www.nereuspharm.com

Nereus Pharmaceuticals was a pharmaceutical company focused on the development of natural products from marine microbial and other natural sources into small molecule human therapeutics. The major disease area addressed by Nereus is cancer. Nereus was purchased by Triphase Research and Development in 2012.

== Drug discovery ==
Until 2004, Nereus used methods licensed from the University of California, San Diego to retrieve and cultivate marine microorganisms, particularly bacteria in the Actinomycetia class and organisms belonging to Kingdom Fungi. Since 2004, the company has focused on commercializing identified bioactive natural products. As of mid-2007, two compounds were being examined in Phase I clinical trials: NPI-2358 and NPI-0052.

- Plinabulin (NPI-2358) is a halimide derivative, halimide itself having been isolated from a member of genus Aspergillus. This compound appears to selectively disrupt tumour vasculature through interaction with microtubules.
- NPI-1342 (Acanthoic Acid analog, NPI-1302a-3) is a plant derived orally active small molecule that targets the NF_kB transcript factor pathway. It is significantly active against cancer and inflammatory diseases and is being developed for clinical testing in multiple myeloma and glioblastoma.
- Salinosporamide A (NPI-0052) is a natural product of Salinispora tropica, a member of the bacterial family Micromonosporaceae that was first isolated in 2002 and taxonomically identified genetically in 2005. NPI-0052 acts as a proteasome inhibitor.
