= Weifa =

Norwegian pharmaceutical company

Weifa ASA
- Type: Allmennaksjeselskap
- Traded as: OSE: WEIFA
- Industry: Pharmaceutical
- Founded: 1940
- Headquarters: Oslo, Norway
- Revenue: 500mill NOK (2012)
- Number of employees: 99
- Website: www.weifa.no

Weifa is a Norwegian pharmaceutical company headquartered in Oslo with production facilities in Kragerø Municipality.

Weifa is one of the world’s largest producers of Metformin hydrochloride and a leading producer of alkaloid opiates. Production facilities follow GMP standards.

== History ==
Weifa was founded by pharmacist Olaf Weider in 1940.

== Therapeutic areas ==
Weifa focuses on three therapeutic areas:

1. Pain management
2. Diabetes management
3. Food supplements

== Products ==
- bra!: Evening primrose oil.
- Bronkyl: Expectorant effervescent tablet.
- Dexyl: Nasal spray.
- Fanalgin: Pain reliever and fever reducer with an addition of caffeine.
- Ferromax: Iron supplement.
- Fluormax: Fluorine supplements.
- Ibux: A brand name for ibuprofen.
- Ibux Gel: A gel version of Ibux.
- Nazamér: Salt water spray.
- Nazaren: Salt water nasal spray.
- Paracet: A brand name for paracetamol.
- Paracetduo: Similar to Paracet with the addition of caffeine for increased pain relief.
- Proxan: Brand name for naproxen.
- Pyrivir: Relieves symptoms of cold sores.
- Samin: Symptom relief in patients with Osteoarthritis.
- Tigerbalsam: Heat rub.
- Tussin: Cough medicine.
- Weifa-C Nypeekstrakt: Vitamin C from rose hip extract.
- Weifa C-vitamin brusetabletter: Vitamin C effervescent tablets.
- Weifa Kalsium: Calcium supplements.

== Active ingredients ==
- Codeine: Used in pain relievers and cough medicine.
- Metformin: Used in first-line treatment of diabetes mellitus type 2.
- Pholcodine: Used in cough medicine.

== Development ==
With a total of over 99 employees, Weifa is today generating an annual turnover of approximately €40 million (35% of the turnover is achieved internationally). Weifa bases its development on 3 criteria:

1. International expansion
2. Expertise in pharmaceuticals and fine chemicals
3. Partnership agreements

== Norway ==
Weifa has market leadership in pain management products for the Norwegian market, with a portfolio of branded products that includes established brand names such as the Ibux tablets, Paracet tablets and Paralgin Forte tablets. Branded products accounts for approximately 70% of net sales.

== Export ==
Weifa’s leading export markets are Germany and United Kingdom. Other export markets include the European Union, Eastern Europe, Africa, North America, South America and Asia.
