= LIFSE =

Pharmaceutical Industrial Laboratory, State Society
- Company type: State-owned
- Industry: Pharmaceuticals
- Founded: 1947
- Headquarters: Santa Fe Province, Argentina
- Key people: Mario Drisun (Chief Executive)
- Products: pharmacy
- Website: www.lif-santafe.com.ar

Laboratorio Industrial Farmacéutico Sociedad del Estado or LIFSE (English: Pharmaceutical Industrial Laboratory, State Society) is a state-owned enterprise that is producing and distributing pharmacy.

== History ==
By 1947, the Santa Fe Province starts with the proceedings for the installation of a medicine plant, to supply the Hospital Pharmacies, which became part of the Ministry of Health National Policies. It was called: Pharmaceutical Industrial Laboratory.

By 1987 The Honorable Legislature of the Province passed the 10.069 Law. This Law states the official creation of the Medicinal Drugs Producing Laboratory (MDPL).

By 1989 The MDPL starts its role as General Direction of Medicinal Drugs Production. It has its own staff, including a Functional Organic Structure and it takes part in the budget of the Ministry of Health as an independent program.

The 11.657 Law authorizes the Executive to transform the MDPL into a State Society.

By 2007 Tha last transformation of MDPL takes place during year 2007. It becomes again the Pharmaceutical Industrial Laboratory.

In April 2008, the Ministry of Health passes the 286 Resolution to create the National Program for the Public Production of Medicines, Vaccines and Medical Products. In this context LIF SE became the first Public Laboratory to provide the Nation with the beta lactam antibiotic Cefalexin Tablets 500 mg. This was carried through the REMEDIAR Program. Continuity in supplying the Nation with Cefalexin during year 2009 was established, as well as the incorporation of the anti diabetics Glibenclamide 5 mg and the Amoxicillin 500 mg.

The constant evolution in building-technological matters, as well as in staff training, makes LIF SE to be prepared to answer to the demands of the Provincial and National Ministry of Health.

Actual LIFSE management focuses on a policy to potentiate production and make itself a variant to solve the many difficulties that may arise on Public Provincial Health. A good example of this is that the province of Santa Fe is the only one in Argentina that will have a state trademark of its own on contraceptives and that will distribute them for free in Hospitals and to affiliated to provincial social security IAPOS.
