= Jaber Ebne Hayyan Pharmaceutical Company =

Iranian pharmaceutical company

- Type: Public company
- Industry: Medical equipment; Pharmaceutical
- Founded: 1960; 66 years ago
- Headquarters: 4th Km - Karaj Special Road, Tehran, Iran
- Products: Pharmaceutical drug Ampoule, Tablet (pharmacy), Capsule (pharmacy)
- Number of employees: 500-1000 (2012)
- Website: www.jaber-pharma.com

Jaber Ebne Hayyan Pharmaceutical Company (Persian: شرکت داروسازی جابر ابن حیان) engages in manufacture and sale of injection and oral antibiotics, ointments, inhalers, nasal sprays & pearls (soft gel capsules). The company was formerly known as Squibb Iran and changed its name in 1979. Jaber Ebne Hayyan Pharmaceutical Company was founded in 1960 and is based in Tehran, Iran. The company is public joint stock and member of Tehran Stock Exchange with the registered capital of 378,000,000,000 rials.

== Products ==
- Ampicillin 250 mg, 500 mg & 1 g vial
- Cefazolin 250 mg, 500 mg & 1 g vial
- Cefotaxime 500 mg & 1 g vial
- Ceftriaxone 500 mg, 1 g & 2 g vial
- Vancomycin 500 mg & 1 g vial
- Nystatin 100000 U vag tab
- Cefixime 200 mg & 400 mg tab
- Cefalexin 250 mg & 500 mg cap
- Ibuprofen 200 mg & 400 mg pearl
- Salbutamol 100 mcg/doseE HFA inhaler
- Fluticasone 125 & 250 mcg/dose HFA inhaler
- Cromolyn 2% 13 mL nasal spray
- Calcitonin 100 & 200 IU/dose nasal spray

== See also ==
- Iranian pharmaceutical industry
