= TME Pharma =

German biotechnology company

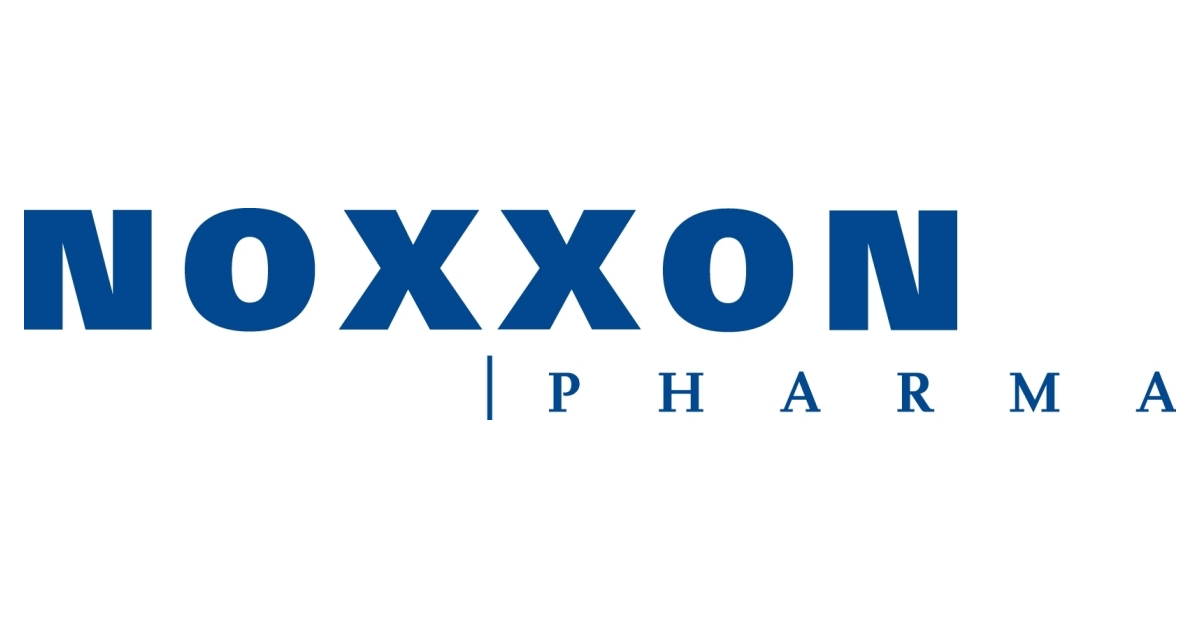
- Type: Aktiengesellschaft
- Traded as: Euronext Growth
- Founded: 1997
- Headquarters: Berlin, Germany,
- Key people: Aram Mangasarian, CEO; Maurizio PetitBon, Chairman of the supervisory board
- Number of employees: 10 (2017)
- Website: www.tmepharma.com

TME Pharma, formerly NOXXON Pharma, is a biotechnology company founded in 1997 in Berlin, Germany which specialises on cancer treatment by targeting the tumor microenvironment. TME Pharma N.V. is listed on Euronext Growth, Paris (ALTME)and is a member of the German Association of Research-Based Pharmaceutical Companies, Verband forschender Arzneimittelhersteller (vfa).

TME Pharma develops drugs using technology yielding L-RNA molecules, which are of mirror-image configuration compared to naturally occurring D-RNA molecules. The company calls these agents Spiegelmers, from Spiegel, the German word for "mirror."

The L-RNA are resistant to the natural RNA nuclease enzymes.

== Products ==
Some Spiegelmer candidates were in clinical trials.

A Spiegelmer (NOX-A12, olaptesed pegol) was under development as a combination therapy for a number of cancer indications. NOX-A12 targets CXCL12 (C-X-C Chemokine Ligand 12), a key chemokine protein. Favorable results were reported in October 2018 during the 4th CRI-CIMT-EATI-AACR International Cancer Immunotherapy Conference in New York, NY, USA.

A different Spiegelmer (NOX-E36, emapticap pegol) was tested for the treatment of progressive diabetic nephropathy. Favorable results were reported in June 2014 in a company press release. NOX-E36 targets MCP-1, also called CCL2.

A third Spiegelmer (NOX-H94, lexaptepid pegol) was in a clinical trial for the treatment of anemia of chronic disease.
