= NatiVita =

Pharmaceutical company

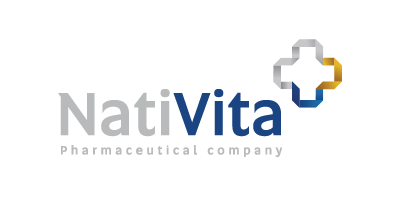
- Company type: Public
- Industry: Innovative medications research and developing
- Founded: 2012
- Website: www.nativita.com

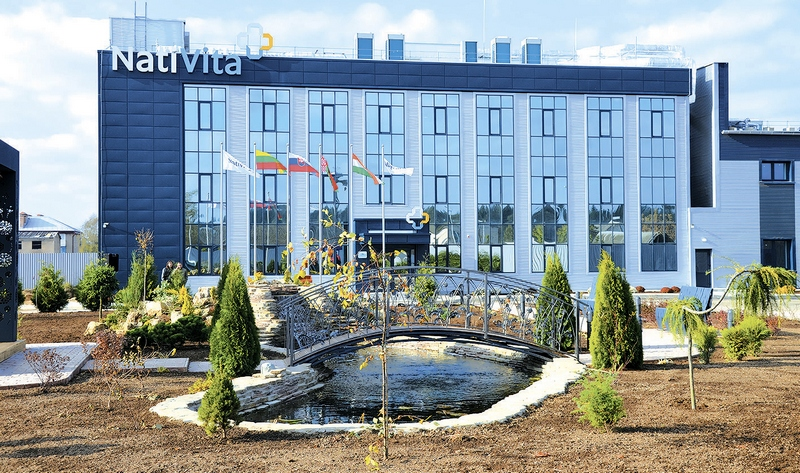

NatiVita is an international research and manufacturing pharmaceutical company, it is situated in Beshankovichy urban settlement, Vitebsk region, Belarus. NatiVita is the first company in Belarus, that started developing and producing biopharmaceutical medicines based on monoclonal antibodies using target cell therapy for specific genetic diseases such as Breast cancer, Lung cancer, Myeloma. The company was established in 2012 with support of AB ZiaValda (Lithuania), «UniPharma» (Slovakia), «NatcoPharma Ltd» (India)

== Pharmaceutical producing complex ==
Pharmaceutical producing complex NatiVita has a full cycle of medicine's production according to the European quality standard GMP

== Scientific-research centre ==
The International Scientific-research centre Nativita was opened in 2017.
