= Helixmith =

South Korean biotechnology company

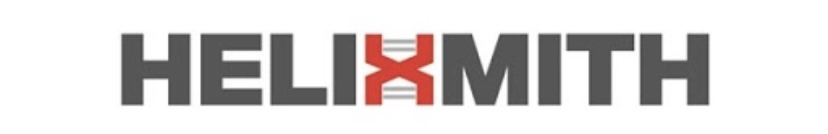
- Formerly: Byromedica Pacific Co. LTD. (1996–1999); ViroMed (1999–2019)
- Type: Public
- Industry: Biotechnology
- Founded: November 1996; 29 years ago
- Founder: Sunyoung KIM, D. Phil
- Headquarters: 21, Magokjungang 8-ro 7-gil, Gangseo-gu, Magok, Seoul, South Korea
- Key people: Sunyoung Kim (CEO), Seungshin Yu (CTO), Sinyoung Kim (COO)
- Number of employees: 121 (2019)
- Website: helixmith.com

Helixmith Co. LTD. is a biotechnology company located in Seoul, South Korea with US presence in San Diego. The company has an extensive gene therapy pipeline, including a non-viral plasmid DNA program for neuromuscular and ischemic disease, a CAR-T program targeting several different types of solid tumors, and an AAV vector program targeting neuromuscular diseases. Helixmith’s lead gene is Engensis (VM202), currently in phase III diabetic peripheral neuropathy (DPN) in the US. Engensis (VM202) is a plasmid DNA designed to simultaneously express two isoforms of hepatocyte growth factor (HGF), HGF 728 and HGF 723. In addition to DPN, Engensis is also being studied in diabetic foot ulcers (DFU), amyotrophic lateral sclerosis (ALS), coronary artery disease (CAD), claudication, and Charcot-Marie-Tooth disease (CMT).

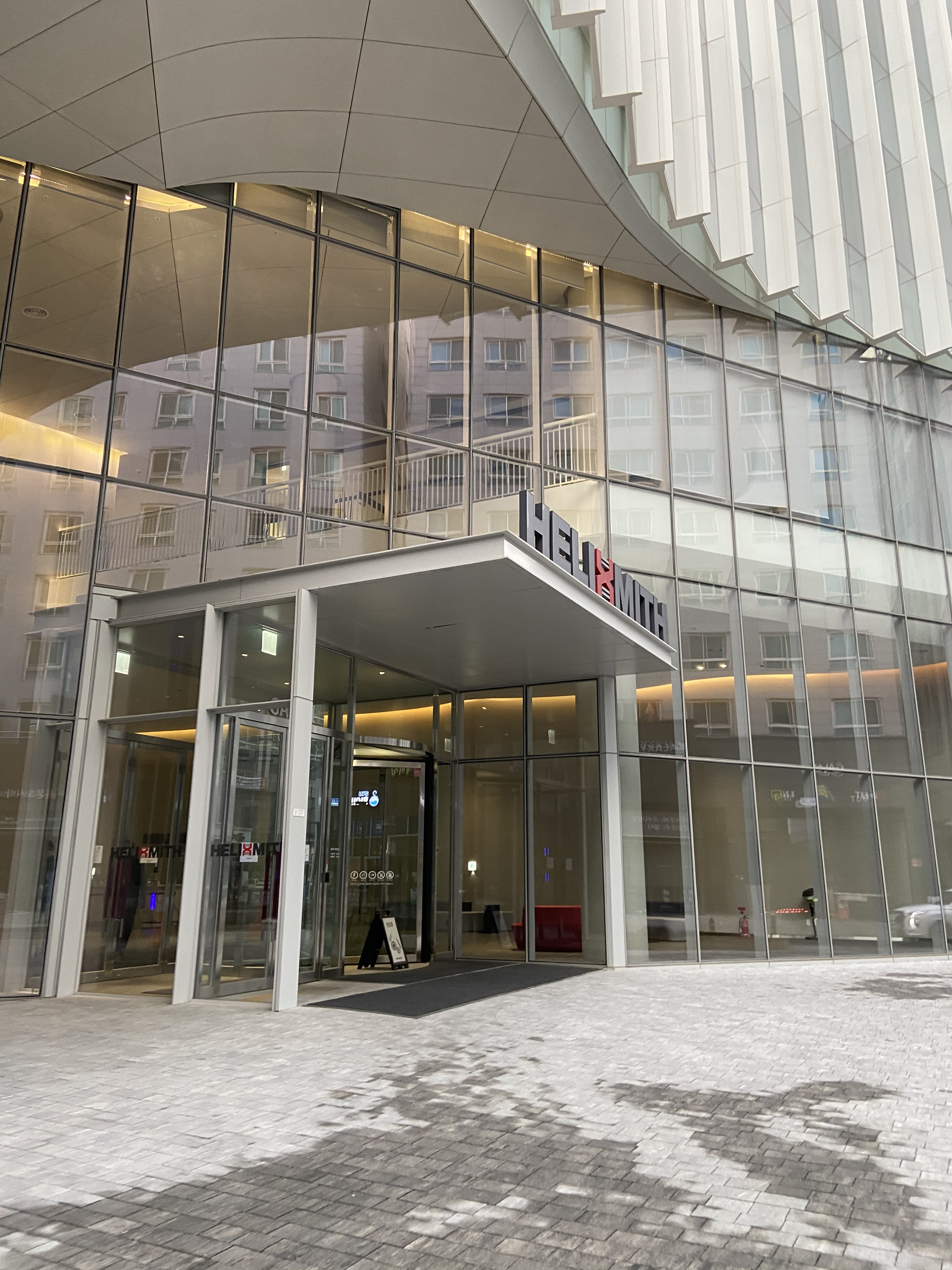
Helixmith headquarters located in Magok, Seoul

== History ==
Helixmith Co. LTD. (prev. ViroMed) was established in 1996 as the first on-campus startup at Seoul National University in 1996, and later renamed to ViroMed in 1999. The company has been listed on the Korean Securities Dealers Automated Quotations (KOSDAQ: 084990) since 2006. In April 2019, the company was renamed to Helixmith, and moved its headquarters from its previous research facility in Seoul National University to Magok, Seoul.

== Overview ==
Helixmith’s main business area is in gene therapy development. Helixmith’s lead gene therapy product is Engensis (VM202), a non-viral plasmid DNA that encodes the therapeutic gene called hepatocyte growth factor (HGF). Engensis is being developed for diabetic peripheral neuropathy (DPN, phase 3) in the US. The product is also being studied for diabetic foot ulcers (DFU, phase 3), amyotrophic lateral sclerosis (ALS, phase 2), coronary artery disease (CAD, phase 2), claudication (phase 2) and Charcot-Marie-Tooth disease (CMT, phase 1/2a).

Helixmith’s pipeline extends to CAR-T cell therapy and AAV gene therapy. In CAR-T cell therapy, the company aims at eradicating various solid tumors. The CAR-T program is in pre-clinical stage through a separate subsidiary called Cartexell. In AAV gene therapy, the company has a number of early stage products targeting neuromuscular diseases such as ALS and multiple sclerosis. Helixmith also has an antibody pipeline including VM507, an antibody that can detect and activate c-MET, receptor of hepatocyte growth factor (HGF).

Helixmith is also developing phytotherapeutics based on natural plant extracts with therapeutic potential. The company has unique experience in areas including natural medicine, health functional food and cosmetic products using botanical sources.

== Products ==
=== Engensis ===
Helixmith’s non-viral plasmid DNA product, Engensis, is designed to express recombinant HGF protein in nerve and Schwann cells to promote nerve system regeneration and induce the formation of microvascular blood vessels.

HGF has a short half-life (5 minutes or less) and is quickly removed from the body by the liver, creating an obstacle to effective treatment with previous injectable recombinant HGF protein products.

A single injection of Helixmith’s proprietary plasmid DNA product expresses the HGF gene at levels 30-40 times higher than conventional plasmid DNA and provides sustained gene expression in mouse models for 2 weeks, with peak protein expression at Day 7 and a gradual decrease over the next week To date, more than 500 patients have been treated with Engensis across ten clinical trials in six different diseases and conditions. Data from previous clinical studies suggest that Engensis is well tolerated and has the potential to provide durable analgesic and/or symptomatic relief in a variety of disease settings. Beyond potentially alleviating pain, Engensis is designed to target the underlying causes of neuropathy through its predicted angiogenic and neuroregenerative properties.

The US FDA recognized the potential for Engensis to meet the unmet need for this condition in 2018 by designating it as a Regenerative Medicine Advanced Therapy (RMAT), making it the first RMAT-designated gene therapy for a prevalent disease with over one million patients. This designation grants all the benefits afforded by the fast track and breakthrough designations, including priority review, to Engensis. Helixmith currently has multiple target indications under the Engensis pipeline: diabetic peripheral neuropathy (DPN, phase 3), diabetic foot ulcers (DFU, phase 3), amyotrophic lateral sclerosis (ALS, phase 2), coronary artery disease (CAD, phase 2), claudication (phase 2) and Charcot-Marie-Tooth disease (CMT, phase 1/2a).

The US FDA granted a RMAT (Regenerative Medicine Advanced Therapy) designation to VM202-DPN in 2018. This is the first RMAT designation for a drug product based in Korea, and the first and the only RMAT designation worldwide in pain area. Engensis has been attracting huge attention in painful DPN because of its big market size. The US FDA granted orphan drug and fast track designation for Engensis (VM202-ALS) in 2016. Engensis (VM202) is currently under development as a possible treatment for chronic DFU with the hope to potentially heal the ulcer by supplying sufficient blood through new blood vessel formation around occluded or narrowed blood vessels towards the lower extremities.

In 2024 Helixmith shared that Engensis VM202-DPN, intended to be used for diabetic peripheral neuropathy, had failed during its phase 3 clinical trail. They found that when the treatment was compared against the placebo group, the Engensis treatment did not prove to be superior.

=== VM507 ===
VM507, Helixmith’s leading antibody treatment, is an antibody that can detect and activate c-MET (HGF receptor). An antibody is an immune protein that binds to an antigen to inhibit its activity or stimulate neutralization or activation. Although it is a protein generated in the immune system originally, an antibody is available to be mass-produced, purified, and analyzed into monoclonal antibody, regarding specific antibodies with selectivity and specificity against specific antigens.

VM507 is an antibody that can detect and activate c-MET, receptor of hepatocyte growth factor (HGF). As a fully human antibody, it has the potential to be safe immunologically, transmissible via blood vessel injection or local injection to other various tissues and organs, and the longer half-life may contribute to improved efficacy.

The c-Met level is especially high in patients with chronic/acute renal disease. VM507 showed therapeutic efficacies such as inhibition of renal fibrosis and improvement of functional index by binding with c-MET receptor in the renal tissue when injected intravenously in the mouse model of renal disease.

=== Status of Clinical Trials ===
According to its website, the company is involved in the following clinical trials:

- VM202-DPN - Phase 3 clinical trial (US)
- VM202-DFU - Phase 3 clinical trial (US)
- VM202-Claudication - Phase 2 clinical trial (US)
- VM202-ALS, Lou Gehrig's Disease - Phase 2 clinical trial (US)
- VM202-CAD - Phase 2 clinical trial (Korea)
- VM202-CMT - Phase 1/2a clinical trial (Korea)
- VM507-Chronic Kidney Disease - Preclinical stage

=== Phytotherapeutics ===
Helixmith currently has two target indications under its phytotherapeutics pipeline: PG201 (Osteoarthritis), and HX204 (Inflammatory bowel disease). PG201 is a prescription drug for osteoarthritis and is the 7th botanical drug that has ever been approved by the MFDS (Ministry of Food and Drug Safety) in 2012. It is being sold under the brand name “LAYLA Tab” and has been generating a domestic annual revenue of 20 billion KRW since it has been licensed out to PMG Pharma.

PG201 showed significant improvement in various animal models of osteoarthritis and rheumatoid arthritis. In addition, it has been founded that it can prevent cartilage destruction by regulating the expression of cartilage degradation enzymes unlike conventional anti-inflammatory analgesic drugs such as NSAIDs. PG201 has proved its safety and efficacy on patients with osteoarthritis by conducting phase II and phase III clinical trials.

HX204 is currently under pre-clinical development and is expected to enter clinical phase in 2022.
