= DNA-directed RNA interference =

DNA-directed RNA interference (ddRNAi) is a gene-silencing technique that utilizes DNA constructs to activate a cell's endogenous RNA interference (RNAi) pathways. DNA constructs are designed to express self-complementary double-stranded RNAs, typically short-hairpin RNAs (shRNA), that bring about the silencing of a target gene or genes once processed. Any RNA, including endogenous messenger RNA (mRNAs) or viral RNAs, can be silenced by designing constructs to express double-stranded RNA complementary to the desired mRNA target.

This mechanism has been recently demonstrated to work therapeutically to silence disease-causing genes across a range of disease models, including viral diseases such as HIV, hepatitis B or hepatitis C, and diseases associated with altered expression of endogenous genes such as drug-resistant lung cancer, neuropathic pain, advanced cancer, and retinitis pigmentosa.

== ddRNAi mechanism ==
Unlike small interfering RNAs (siRNA) that turn over within a cell and silence genes transiently, DNA constructs are continually transcribed, replenishing the cellular supply of siRNAs. This allows for the long-term silencing of targeted genes, which has the potential for ongoing clinical benefit with reduced medical intervention.

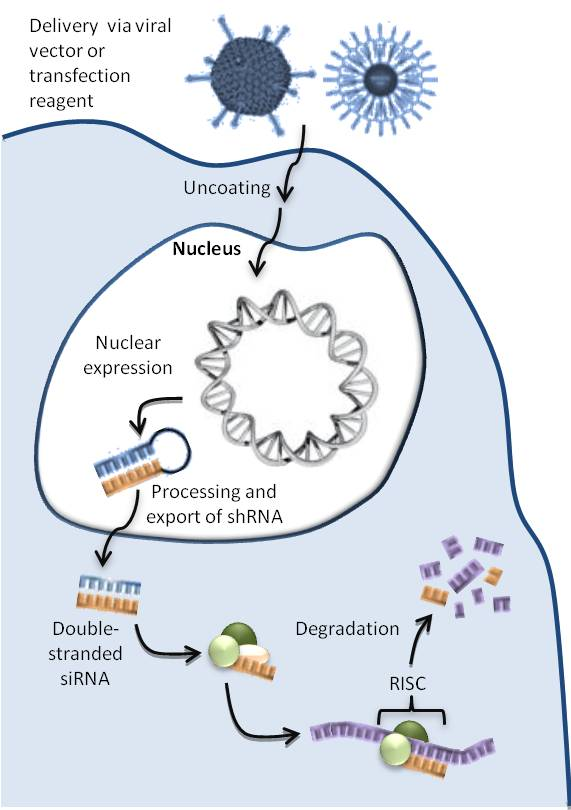
Figure 1: A ddRNAi construct encoding a shRNA is packaged into a delivery vector (or reagent) tailored to target specific cells. Inside the cell, the DNA is transported to the nucleus where transcription machinery continually manufactures the encoded RNAs. The shRNA molecules are then processed by endogenous systems before entering the RNAi pathway and silencing the desired genes.

== Organization of ddRNAi constructs ==
Figure 1 illustrates the most common type of ddRNAi DNA construct designed to express a shRNA. This figure consists of a promoter sequence driving the expression of sense and antisense sequences separated by a loop sequence, followed by a transcriptional terminator. The antisense sequence processed from the shRNA can bind to the target RNA and specify its degradation. shRNA constructs typically encode sense and antisense sequences of 20–30 nucleotides. Flexibility in construct design is possible; for example, the positions of sense and antisense sequences can be reversed, and other modifications and additions can alter intracellular shRNA processing. Moreover, a variety of promoter loop and terminator sequences can be used.

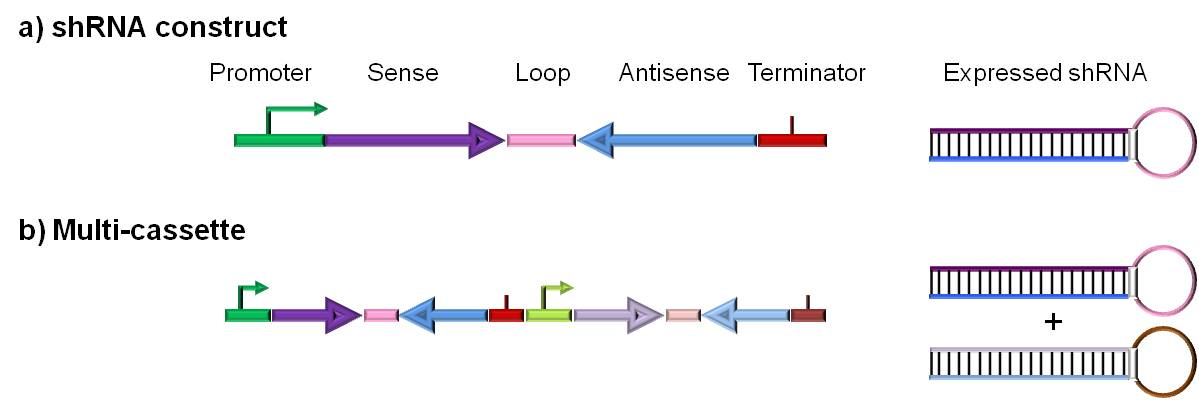
Figure 2: ddRNAi DNA constructs

A variant of this is the multi-cassette (Figure 2b). Designed to express two or more shRNAs, it can target multiple sequences for degradation simultaneously, which can be beneficial in circumstances such as when targeting viruses. Natural sequence variations can render a single shRNA-target site unrecognizable, preventing RNA degradation. Multi-cassette constructs that target multiple sites within the same viral RNA circumvent this issue.

== Delivery ==
Delivery of ddRNAi DNA constructs is a major challenge for RNAi-based therapy. There are a number of clinically-approved gene therapy vectors developed for therapeutic use. Two broad strategies to facilitate the delivery of DNA constructs to the desired cells are available: these use either viral vectors or one of several classes of transfection reagents.

In vivo delivery of ddRNAi constructs has been demonstrated using a range of vectors and reagents with different routes of administration (ROA). ddRNAi constructs have also been successfully delivered into host cells ex vivo, and then transplanted back into the host.

For example, in a phase I clinical trial at the City of Hope National Medical Center, California, four HIV-positive patients with non-Hodgkin's lymphoma were successfully treated with autologous hematopoietic progenitor cells pre-transduced ex vivo with ddRNAi constructs using lentiviral vectors. This construct was designed to express three therapeutic RNAs, one of which was a shRNA, thereby combating HIV replication in three different ways:

- shRNA, silencing the tat and rev genes of the HIV genome;
- CCR5 ribozyme, inhibiting viral cell entry;
- TAR decoy RNA, inhibiting initiation of viral transcription.

Ongoing expression of the shRNA has been confirmed in T cells, monocytes, and B cells more than one year after transplantation.

== Therapeutic applications ==
=== Neuropathic pain ===
Nervana is an investigational V construct that knocks down the expression of protein kinase C gamma (PKCγ) known to be associated with neuropathic pain and morphine tolerance.

Two conserved PKCγ sequences across all key model species and humans have been identified, and both single and double DNA cassettes are designed. In vitro, the expression of PKCγ was silenced by 80%. When similar ddRNAi constructs were delivered intrathecally using a lentiviral vector, pain relief in a neuropathic-rat model was demonstrated.

=== Drug-resistant non-small-cell lung cancer ===
The development of resistance to chemotherapies such as paclitaxel and cisplatin in non-small-cell lung cancer (NSCLC) is strongly associated with overexpression of beta III tubulin. Investigations by the Children's Cancer Institute Australia (University of New South Wales, Lowy Cancer Research Centre) demonstrated that beta III-tubulin knockdown by ddRNAi delayed tumor growth and increased chemosensitivity in mouse models.

Tributarna is a triple DNA cassette expressing three shRNA molecules each of which separately targets beta III tubulin and strongly inhibits its expression. Studies in an orthotopic-mouse model, where the construct is delivered by a modified polyethylenimine vector, jetPEI, that targets lung tissue are in progress.

=== Hepatitis B viral infection ===
The hepatitis B virus (HBV) genome encodes its own DNA polymerase for replication. Biomics Biotechnologies has evaluated around 5000 siRNA sequences of this gene for effective knockdown; five sequences were chosen for further investigation and were shown to have silencing activity when converted into shRNA expression cassettes. A multi-cassette construct, Hepbarna, is under preclinical development for delivery by an adeno-associated virus 8 (AAV-8) liver-targeting vector.

=== Oculopharyngeal muscular dystrophy ===
Classified as an orphan disease, there is currently no therapy for oculopharyngeal muscular dystrophy (OPMD), as it is caused by a mutation in the poly(A) binding protein nuclear 1 (PABPN1) gene. Silencing the mutant gene using ddRNAi offers a potential therapeutic approach.

=== HIV/AIDS ===
Besides the ex vivo approach discussed above, the Center for Infection and Immunity Amsterdam (CINIMA) of the University of Amsterdam, Netherlands, is extensively researching the therapeutic potential of multi-cassette DNA constructs for HIV.

== Concerns ==
As with all gene therapies, a number of safety and toxicity issues must be evaluated during the development of ddRNAi therapeutic techniques.

=== Oncogene activation by viral insertion ===
Some gene therapy vectors integrate into the host genome, thereby acting as insertional mutagens. This was a particular issue with early retroviral vectors, where insertions adjacent to oncogenes resulted in the development of lymphoid tumors.

Adeno-associated virus (AAV) vectors are considered low-risk for host-genome integration, as AAV infection has not been associated with the induction of cancers in humans despite widespread prevalence across the general population. Moreover, extensive clinical use of AAV vectors has provided no evidence of carcinogenicity. While lentiviral vectors do integrate into the genome, they do not appear to show a propensity to activate oncogene expression.

=== Immune response to gene therapy vectors ===
An immunological response to an adenoviral vector resulted in the death of a patient in an early human trial. Careful monitoring of potential toxicities in preclinical testing and analysis of any pre-existing antibodies to gene therapy vectors in patients minimizes such risks.

=== Innate immune response ===
siRNAs have been shown to activate immune responses through interaction with toll-like receptors (TLRs), leading to interferon responses. These TLRs reside on the cell's outer surface, so ddRNAi constructs, which are delivered directly into the intracellular space, are not expected to induce such a response.

=== Toxic effects due to over-expression of shRNAs ===
High-level expression of shRNAs has been shown to be toxic. Strategies to minimize levels of shRNA expression or promote precise processing of shRNAs can mitigate this issue.

=== Off-target effects ===
The unintended silencing of genes that share sequence homology with expressed shRNAs could theoretically occur. Careful selection of shRNA sequences and thorough preclinical testing of constructs can mitigate this risk.
