= Akbarieh =

Iranian pharmaceutical company

Akbarieh (Persian: اکبریه), headquarters in Tehran, Iran, is one of the oldest suppliers of pharmaceuticals and fine chemicals and importers to Iran. Established in 1890, the company is still operated by the Akbarieh family. Akbarieh customers are health professionals, and manufacturers of pharmaceuticals, food, cosmetic and feed industries.

Akbarieh provides API (Active Pharmaceutical Ingredient), animal health and nutrition products, cosmetic raw materials and finished goods, and food additives.

== History ==
Akbarieh Company was founded by Ali Akbar Akbarieh MD in 1890 in the city of Tabriz, Iran to supply pharmaceutical products and modern medicine to the local population. The Company moved from Tabriz to the capital, Tehran in 1944. The business currently provides pharmaceutical products, ingredients, raw materials, laboratory and hospital equipment to the Iranian market.

== Principal partners and suppliers ==
- DSM
- Hoffmann-La Roche
- Roche Diagnostics
- Bayer Schering Pharma
- Boehringer Ingelheim

== Affiliated companies ==
- Damavand Distribution Company. One of Akbarieh Company's distribution companies.

== See also ==
- Pharmaceutical industry in Iran
