= Flexion Therapeutics =

American biotechnology company

Flexion Therapeutics, Inc.
- Type: Public
- Traded as: Nasdaq: FLXN; Russell 2000 Component
- Industry: Pharmaceuticals
- Founded: 2007; 19 years ago
- Headquarters: Burlington, Massachusetts, U.S.
- Website: flexiontherapeutics.com

Flexion Therapeutics, Inc. is an American biopharmaceutical company based in Burlington, Massachusetts that is focused on the discovery, development and commercialization of novel, local therapies for the treatment of patients with musculoskeletal conditions, beginning with osteoarthritis (OA), the most common form of arthritis.

Flexion was founded around 2007 by two former Eli Lilly and Company executives, Michael Clayman and Neil Bodick, and it went public in 2014.

In November 2016 the FDA accepted Flexion's New Drug Application for FX006, an extended-release formulation of triamcinolone acetonide (a corticosteroid), branded "Zilretta". In October 2017 Zilretta was approved by the FDA as the first and only extended-release intra-articular therapy for patients confronting osteoarthritis-related knee pain.

In December 2017, Flexion acquired an investigational gene therapy product candidate for the treatment of osteoarthritis (OA), known as FX201. In late 2019, the company initiated a Phase 1 clinical trial evaluating safety and tolerability of FX201 in 15-24 patients. Flexion believes FX201 holds the potential to provide extended relief from OA knee pain for at least six to 12 months and modify the disease.

In September 2019, Flexion announced the development of FX301, a locally administered NaV1.7 inhibitor product candidate, known as funapide, formulated for extended release in a thermosensitive hydrogel. The initial development of FX301 is intended to support administration as a peripheral nerve block for control of post-operative pain. Flexion believes FX301 has the potential to provide effective pain relief while preserving motor function and anticipates initiating clinical trials in 2021.
