= HIPRA =

Spanish pharmaceutical company

Laboratorios Hipra S.A.
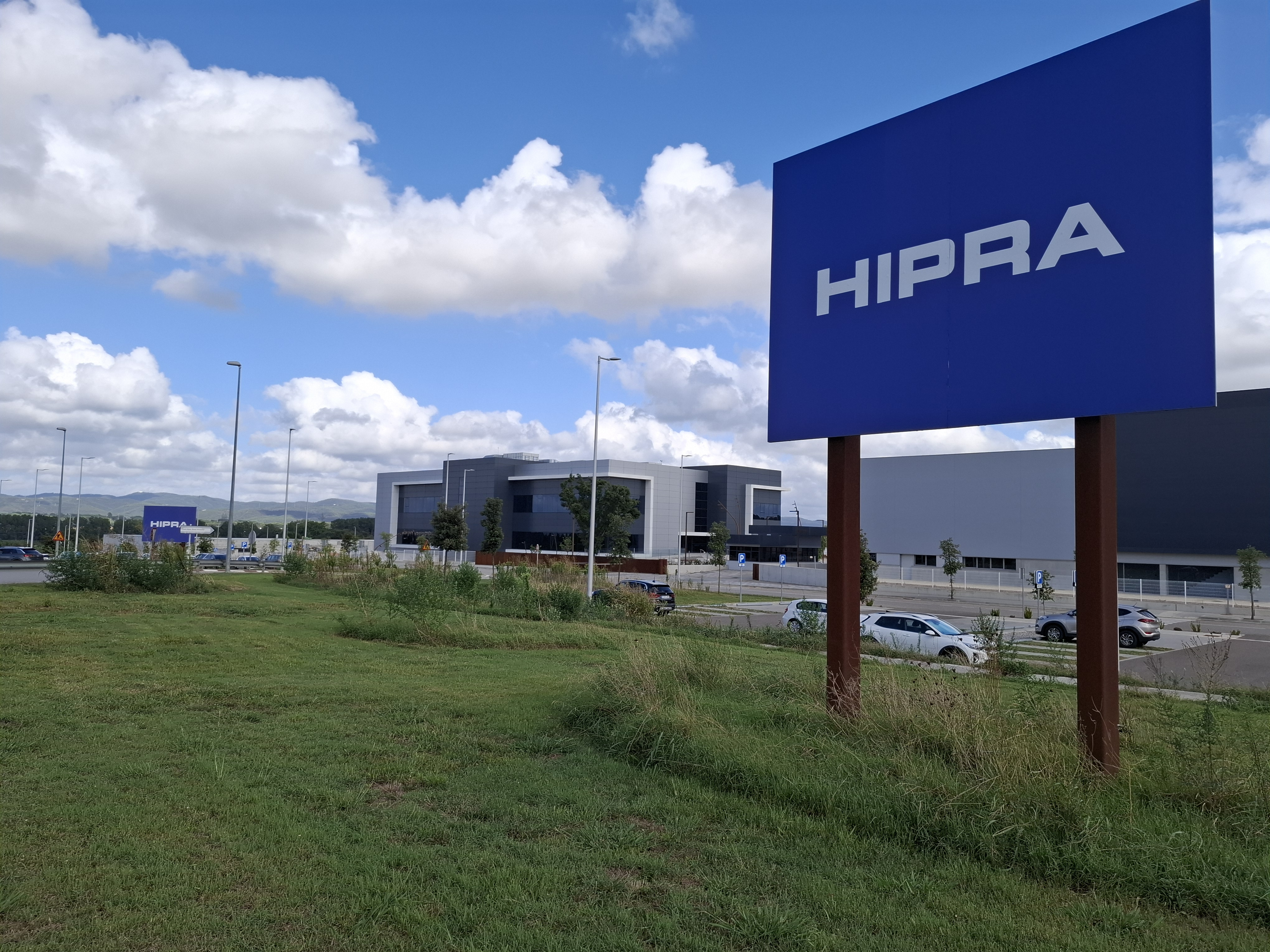
- Research and development facility from HIPRA in Aiguaviva.
- Type: Private
- Industry: Pharmaceuticals
- Founded: 1971; 55 years ago
- Founder: Joan Nogareda Gifre
- Headquarters: Amer, Spain
- Key people: David Nogareda Estivill (chairman)
- Revenue: ▲€516 million (2025)
- Net income: ▲€53.9 million (2025)
- Number of employees: ▲2,800 (2025)
- Website: hipra.com

HIPRA, formally Laboratorios Hipra S.A., is a biotech pharmaceutical company headquartered in Amer, Catalonia, Spain. Founded in 1971, it focuses on the development, manufacturing, and commercialization of biological products for animal and human health.

HIPRA has an international presence in 40 countries with its own subsidiaries, 3 research and development centres and 6 production sites located in Europe and America. It also maintains open distribution channels with more than 100 countries.

The company operates three main business divisions. The animal health division, its core historical business, maintains a portfolio of over 100 vaccines with 25 more in development. The human health unit, started in 2020, focuses on COVID-19 vaccines and digestive health products. The biotech services division was introduced in 2025 and operates as a contract development and manufacturing organization (CDMO).

== History ==
HIPRA was founded in 1954 as a small veterinary laboratory in Madrid. The name is an acronym derived from the surnames of its creators, Hidalgo and Prado. In 1971, chemist and pharmacist Joan Nogareda Gifre acquired the company and refounded it two years later in Amer, Girona, maintaining the original name.

During the 80s, the company continued to grow, reaching a €10 million turnover and a team of 80 employees in 1991. That same year, founder Joan Nogareda Gifre transferred leadership of the company to his children: David Nogareda Estivill, who serves as president, Maria del Mar Nogareda Estivill, as executive vice president, and Arnau Nogareda Estivill, who joined the company's board of directors.

In the late 90s, Hipra started its international expansion by opening its first subsidiary in Uruguay in 1997. This trend continued through the 2000s, eventually reaching the current 40 subsidiaries, 3 research centres, and 6 manufacturing sites. In 2009 the company stopped manufacturing antibiotics to focus on vaccines. By 2012 the company had increased the revenue to €144 million and had approximately 800 employees.

In the wake of the coronavirus pandemic, HIPRA created its human health division in 2020 and began developing a vaccine against COVID-19. The vaccine developed by HIPRA is an adjuvanted recombinant protein vaccine based on a receptor-binding domain (RBD) fusion heterodimer containing the alpha and beta variants of SARS-CoV-2. This vaccine was named Bimervax, and it was approved by the European Medicines Agency in March 30, 2023. The Catalan Government awarded HIPRA the Creu de Sant Jordi in June 2022 for "its involvement in the research of a new vaccine against the disease caused by the SARS-CoV-2 virus" and for its "commitment to the country's public health". In 2021, the human health division also acquired GoodGut, a biotechnological startup dedicated to the research and development of diagnostic tests for digestive diseases.

In 2025, the company surpassed €500 million in revenue, with a net profit of €53.9 million, and employing more than 2,800 people. That same year, HIPRA started operating its contract development and manufacturing organization, the third division of the company.

== Animal health ==
HIPRA has developed more than 100 vaccines for different animal species, both production and companion animals, against a wide variety of biological targets. In addition to its Amer plant, the company has another plant in Brazil, in the Porto Alegre conurbation. It also has a university research centre in the United States.

HIPRA's animal health products include vaccines, vaccination devices, integrated traceability services and diagnostic kits.
