= Somnogen Canada Inc =

Canadian pharmaceutical company

Somnogen is a Canadian multinational pharmaceutical corporation with its global headquarters located in Toronto, Canada. Somnogen produces and develop a wide range of prescription and over-the-counter medications in the field of sleep medicine. Somnogen has a portfolio of products for major areas within the field of sleep/wake therapeutic segment including insomnia and excessive daytime sleepiness.

Somogen was founded by Seithikurippu Ratnas Pandi-Perumal, who was an Indian-born Canadian citizen. Somnogen initially launched its operation in India with a set of prescription and over-the-counter portfolio sleep medications. Currently the company doesn't have a factory of its own, but contract manufactures its products with othercompanies.

== Product portfolio ==
Achoosom tablets (Diphenhydramine HCl 10 mg)

Benzax 0.25/0.5 mg tablets (Alprazolam 0.25 mg and 0.5 mg)

Benzax-F tablets (Alprazolam 0.25 mg + Fluoxetine 20 mg)

Depresom-ID tablets (Imipramine HCl 25 mg + Diazepam 5 mg)

Doxesom tablets (Doxepin HCl 3 mg)

Hydrozet-10 tablets (Cetirizine HCl 10 mg)

Loresta tablets (Lorazepam 1 mg and 2 mg)

Somnotril 0.5 tablets (Clonazepam 0.5 mg)

Somnolex tablets (Clonazepam 0.5 mg + Ecitalopram 10 mg)

Tophan capsules (Tryptophan 50 mg)

Xanfeine tablets (Caffeine 100 mg)

Zoltar 5/10 tablets (Zolpidem tartrate 5 mg and 10 mg)
