= Simcere Pharmaceutical =

Chinese pharmaceutical company

Simcere Pharmaceutical Group
- Type: Listed, SEHK: 2096
- Industry: Pharmaceuticals
- Headquarters: Nanjing, Jiangsu, China
- Website: www.simcere.com

Simcere Pharmaceutical Group or Simcere Pharmaceutical (Chinese: 先声药业, SEHK: 2096) is a manufacturer and supplier of branded generic pharmaceuticals in the Chinese market. Its focus is to introduce generic and pharmaceutical products for the treatment of diseases with high incidence and/or mortality rate. The company has introduced a generic anti-stroke medication under the brand name, Bicun, and an anti-cancer medication under the brand name, Endu. Its products include antibiotics, anti-stroke medications, anti-inflammatory drugs, anti-cancer medications and other medicines. In addition, it has obtained approvals from the China State Food and Drug Administration (SFDA) to manufacture and sell over 210 other products.

== Acquisitions ==
In November 2007, the company acquired Master Luck Corporation Limited, which holds 85.7% of Nanjing Tung Chit Pharmaceutical Co., Ltd.

== Products ==
The Company manufactures and sells 39 pharmaceuticals marketed under various brands. Of these products, 33 are prescription pharmaceuticals and six are over-the-counter (OTC) pharmaceuticals. In addition, it is also the distributor of Yingtaiqing-branded generic diclofenac sodium sustained-release capsules, the Faneng-branded generic alfacalcidol soft capsules and the Yineng-branded generic lentinan injection, all of which are prescription pharmaceuticals manufactured by independent third parties.

== Endu ==
Recombinant human endostatin is a genetically engineered protein that interferes with the growth of blood vessels to a tumor, thereby starving and preventing the growth of tumor cells. Endu is a modified version of endostatin. Endu has been engineered to contain an additional nine-amino acid sequence to enhance protein purification, solubility and stability and has been shown to improve the function of endostatin. In June 2007, the company acquired an additional 10% equity interest in Yantai Medgenn. The company is conducting Phase IV clinical trials for Endu in approximately 150 hospitals in China.

== Bicun ==
Bicun is Simcere Pharmaceutical's prescription edaravone injection pharmaceutical for the treatment of strokes. Edaravone is a synthetic-free radical scavenger and has been proved to be effective. Edaravone protects the brain by eliminating excessive free radicals, which are highly reactive molecules occurring in the human body as a result of stroke, an excessive number of which could result in cell damage.

== Zailin ==
Zailin is the brand name for the company's line of generic prescription amoxicillin antibiotics, which includes capsules, dispersible tablets, granules and injection. During the year ended December 31, 2007, revenues of Zailin accounted for 21% of the company's product revenues.

== Yingtaiqing ==
Yingtaiqing is the brand name for Simcere Pharmaceutical's generic diclofenac sodium in sustained-release capsules and gelatin dosage format, which is an anti-inflammatory pain reliever and analgesic drug used to treat rheumatoid arthritis and osteoarthritis. Yingtaiqing sustained-release capsules are prescription pharmaceuticals and are manufactured by a third-party manufacturer, the China Pharmaceutical University Pharmaceutical Company (China Pharmaceutical), and the company has entered into a distribution agreement with China Pharmaceutical to distribute and sell Yingtaiqing sustained-release capsules in China. In 2007, sales of Yingtaiqing accounted for 10.3% of the company's product revenues.

== Other Branded Generics ==
- Biqi is the brand name for its generic OTC anti-diarrhea pharmaceutical. The Company obtained approval to manufacture and sell Biqi in November 1999.
- Zaiqi is the brand name for the company's azithromycin granules antibiotics for the treatment of infections.
- Zaike is the brand name for its cefaclor in dry suspension antibiotics for the treatment of infections.
- Simcere Kechuanning is the brand name for Simcere Pharmaceutical's OTC herbal medicine used for the treatment of coughs. It comes in oral liquid and tablet formulations.
- Zaikang is the brand name for its OTC compound zinc gluconate and ibuprofen granules for the treatment of cold symptoms, such as fever, nasal congestion, running nose and sneezing.
- Faneng is the brand name for the company's alfacalcidol soft capsules for the treatment of osteoporosis.

== See also ==
- Pharmaceutical industry of China
