= NeilMed =

American pharmaceutical company

NeilMed Pharmaceuticals Inc
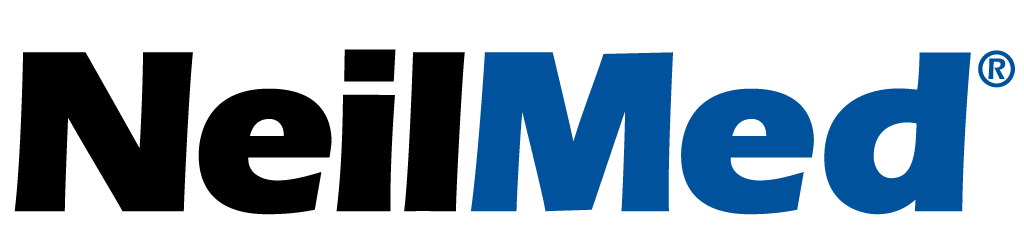
- Type: Private
- Industry: Pharmaceuticals, medical devices
- Founder: Ketan C. Mehta M.D. and Nina Mehta
- Headquarters: Santa Rosa, California
- Area served: Globally
- Number of employees: 500+ (worldwide)
- Website: neilmed.com

NeilMed Pharmaceuticals Inc. is an American pharmaceutical, medical devices' manufacturer & supplier company based in Santa Rosa, California. It manufactures and supplies nasal saline over-the-counter products, including the patented Sinus Rinse Kit, a nasal irrigation system.

== History ==
NeilMed Pharmaceuticals was founded by Ketan C. Mehta, a pulmonary and critical-care physician, and Nina Mehta in the year 2000. It started as a side project in 1999 to build a device that could be used to effectively and naturally rinse the sinuses for sinusitis sufferers known as NeilMed Sinus Rinse. In early 2005, the company developed the NasaFlo Neti Pot for nasal irrigation. The products were initially sold regionally and later expanded services nationwide in the U.S. and then to several countries in Europe, North and South America, Asia and Oceania.

In May 2018 founders Ketan Mehta and Nina Mehta established the NeilMed Endowed Support Fund in the Department of Otolaryngology at the Wayne State University School of Medicine in Detroit.

In November 2021, the company expanded its production facility in Sonoma County. It has additional facilities in Southern California, New Jersey, Japan, Canada, etc.

== Operations ==
NeilMed Pharmaceuticals has offices in 10 countries, and distributes to more than 25 countries. It focuses on nasal care, ear care, first aid and baby care. It provides Neti Pot kits, Sinus Rinse squeeze bottles with proprietary sodium sinus rinse formulations, nasal moisturizers, gels and saline sprays, ear wax removal kits, wound and piercing aftercare cleansing sprays and other devices and accessories.

== Research ==
NeilMed Pharmaceuticals has participated in several clinical research and studies including examining the role of surfactants in recalcitrant chronic rhinosinusitis (CRS), determining the incidence of bacterial cross-contamination using the pulsating nasal irrigation device, investigating the effectiveness of microwave disinfection for reducing both nasal irrigation bottle and irrigation fluid contamination risk after endoscopic sinus surgery (ESS) and determining the sinus penetration potential of commercially available irrigation systems in maximally operated sinus cavities.

== Public activities ==
In 2012, NeilMed Pharmaceuticals collaborated with University of North Carolina Hospitals to send 100,000 units of Sinus Rinse and Neti Pots to the armed forces serving in Afghanistan.
