= McGuff Companies =

American health care company

McGuff Company, Inc.
- Type: Private
- Industry: Health Care
- Founded: 1979
- Founder: Ronald M. McGuff
- Headquarters: Santa Ana, California, United States,
- Area served: North America
- Number of employees: 110 (2024)
- Website: www.McGuff.com

The McGuff Companies consist of three entities: a wholesale distributor of medical supplies, a pharmaceutical manufacturing facility which produces sterile injectables for national and international distribution, and a 503B outsourcing facility (in development). The McGuff Companies have been featured in the International Journal of Pharmaceutical Compounding (IJPC).

== Corporate structure ==
=== McGuff Company, Inc. (MCI) ===
The McGuff Company, Inc. is a medical products wholesale distributor of pharmaceutical and medical products, and oral nutritional supplements. Founded in 1972 and incorporated in 1984, the company initially provided a full range of disposable medical office products and specialized in parenterals ranging from vaccines to vitamin B_{12}.

=== McGuff Pharmaceuticals, Inc. (MPI) ===
Incorporated in 2002, McGuff Pharmaceuticals, Inc. is an FDA reviewed cGMP manufacturer of sterile injectable drugs. MPI maintains offices in the United States and Canada and develops drugs for clinical trials.

=== McGuff Outsourcing Solutions (MOS) ===
McGuff Outsourcing Solutions (MOS) inherits more than 20 years of compounding experience from its predecessor, McGuff Compounding Pharmacy Services (MCPS). MCPS provides physicians and patients with over 1,000 unique sterile and non-sterile products.

According to the company, McGuff Outsourcing Solutions operates as a 503B outsourcing facility.

== Qualifications ==
Qualifications of McGuff Pharmaceuticals

1. Clinical Trial: University of California, Los Angeles (UCLA); University of California, Irvine (UCI); Long Beach Memorial Medical Center and others
2. Certificates: American National Standard; ISO 9001:2000 Quality Systems-Model for Quality Assurance
3. Inspections: California State Board of Pharmacy, the U.S. Food and Drug Administration (FDA)
