= Pharmaceutical industry in Gujarat =

The Pharmaceutical industry in Gujarat ranks number one in India with a 33% share in drug manufacturing and a 28% share in drug exports. The state has 130 USFDA certified drug manufacturing facilities. Ahmedabad and Vadodara are considered as pharmaceutical hubs as there are many big and small pharma companies established in these cities.

Gujarat is one of the major states in India and has a significant presence in the pharmaceutical industry. The state is home to several large pharmaceutical companies: Sun Pharmaceuticals ,Cadila Pharmaceuticals, Torrent Pharmaceuticals, Alembic Pharmaceuticals, Intas Pharmaceuticals, Zydus Lifesciences, Amneal Pharmaceuticals, USV Pharmaceuticals, Baxter Healthcare and Outsuka Pharma more.

== Overview ==
Gujarat has become a hub for the pharmaceutical industry, with several established companies such as Torrent Pharmaceuticals, Zydus Lifesciences, Cadila Pharmaceuticals, Alembic Pharmaceuticals, Sun Pharma, Claris, Intas Pharmaceuticals, and Dishman Pharmaceuticals having operations in the state. Gujarat currently has around 5000 drug manufacturing units and contributes 42 percent of India's pharmaceutical turnover and 22 percent of its exports as of 2008. Over 52,000 individuals are employed in Gujarat's pharmaceutical sector, which has experienced a Compound Annual Growth Rate (CAGR) of 54 percent in capital investments over the last three years.

Gujarat's pharmaceutical industry holds a significant position in India, accounting for 40 percent of the country's total pharmaceutical production and 17 percent of its exports. The industry is valued at US$5.5 Billion.

== History ==
- 1907: Alembic Pharmaceuticals, one of the oldest pharmaceutical companies in India, was established in Vadodara, Gujarat. This was just six years after India's first domestic pharmaceutical unit, Bengal Chemical and Pharmaceutical Works, was set up in Calcutta.

During the 1940s and 50s, companies like The Gujarat Pharmaceutical and Chemical Works, Sarabhai Chemicals, Atul Products Ltd, Allied and Cadila Laboratories were established.

- 1947: The Drugs Laboratory in Vadodara was established, followed by LM College of Pharmacy.
- 1989: The B.V. Patel Education Trust, Ahmedabad and Gujarat Branch of Indian Pharmaceutical Association (IPA) established the B.V. Patel Pharmaceutical Education and Research Development (PERD) Centre in Ahmedabad.

Over the years, the pharmaceutical industry in Gujarat has grown significantly. The invested capital to labor ratio has risen significantly and the employment rate has almost doubled between 1979 and 1980 and 1997–98. There are currently around 3,500 drug manufacturing units in Gujarat, which employ over 52,000 individuals.

- 2000: The Government of Gujarat declared the state a "pharma hub" and initiated several measures to promote the growth of the industry.
- 2003: Torrent Pharmaceuticals, one of the leading pharmaceutical companies in Gujarat, received US FDA approval for its manufacturing facilities.
- 2005: Alembic Pharmaceuticals, another major pharmaceutical company in Gujarat, received US FDA approval for its manufacturing facilities.
- 2008: The Gujarat Government announced a new pharmaceutical policy to attract more investment in the sector.
- 2017: The Government of Gujarat signs 249 MoUs with pharmaceuticals cos attracting investments worth Rs. 150 billion at Vibrant Gujarat Summit.
- 2020: India's first Medical devices manufacturing park announced in Rajkot.
- 2022: The Government of Gujarat announced bulk drug park in Jambusar, Bharuch.
- Government announces new Biotechnology Policy in Gujarat.

== Cluster and SEZs ==

Location	Ahmedabad	Vadodara	Ankleshwar	
Occupants	Company name / Plant Location; Torrent Pharmaceuticals Ltd. / Bhat, Ahmedabad; Zydus Cadila Healthcare Ltd. / Sarkhej, Ahmedabad; Intas Pharmaceuticals Ltd. / Matoda, Ahmedabad; Cadila Healthcare Ltd. / Dholka, Ahmedabad; Aurobindo Pharma Ltd. / Changodar, Ahmedabad; Biocon Ltd. / Kadi, Ahmedabad; Claris Lifesciences Ltd. / Naroda, Ahmedabad; Dishman Pharmaceuticals and Chemicals Ltd. / Naroda, Ahmedabad; Nirma Limited (Nirlife Division) / Vatva, Ahmedabad; Sun Pharma Advanced Research Company Ltd. (SPARC) / Thaltej, Ahmedabad; Cadila Pharmaceuticals Ltd. / Santej, Ahmedabad; Eris Lifesciences Ltd. / Santej, Ahmedabad; Gujarat Themis Biosyn Ltd. / Vatva, Ahmedabad; Indoco Remedies Ltd. / Moraiya, Ahmedabad; Lincoln Pharmaceuticals Ltd. / Narol, Ahmedabad; Parenteral Drugs (India) Ltd. / Vatva, Ahmedabad; Saurav Chemicals Ltd. / Changodar, Ahmedabad; Sterling Biotech Ltd. / Bavla, Ahmedabad; Unichem Laboratories Ltd. / Naroda, Ahmedabad; Alembic Pharmaceuticals Ltd. / Panelav, Vadodara (near Ahmedabad); Elico Healthcare Services Ltd. / Sarkhej, Ahmedabad; Exemed Pharmaceuticals Pvt. Ltd. / Kadi, Ahmedabad; Flamingo Pharmaceuticals Ltd. / Naroda, Ahmedabad; Gufic Biosciences Ltd. / Changodar, Ahmedabad; Novartis India Ltd. / Changodar, Ahmedabad; Sarthak Biosciences Pvt. Ltd. / Changodar, Ahmedabad; Shilpa Medicare Ltd. / Dholka, Ahmedabad; Troikaa Pharmaceuticals Ltd. / Dehgam, Ahmedabad; Zim Laboratories Ltd. / Changodar, Ahmedabad	Company name / Plant Location; Sun Pharmaceutical Industries Ltd. / Halol, Vadodara; Alembic Pharmaceuticals Ltd. / Panelav, Vadodara; Cadila Healthcare Ltd. / Dholka, Vadodara; Merck Ltd. / Savli, Vadodara; Sterling Biotech Ltd. / Padra, Vadodara; Novartis India Ltd. / Savli, Vadodara; Pfizer Ltd. / Makarpura, Vadodara; Thermax Ltd. / Savli, Vadodara; Astec Lifesciences Ltd. / Padra, Vadodara; Gujarat Fluorochemicals Ltd. / Savli, Vadodara; Sanofi India Ltd. / Savli, Vadodara; Jubilant Life Sciences Ltd. / Savli, Vadodara; Sandoz Pvt. Ltd. / Savli, Vadodara; Torrent Pharmaceuticals Ltd. / Indrad, Vadodara; IPCA Laboratories Ltd. / Piparia, Vadodara; Alembic Pharma Ltd. / Karakhadi, Vadodara; Dr. Reddy's Laboratories Ltd. / Makarpura, Vadodara; Sun Pharma Advanced Research Company Ltd. / Vadodara, Vadodara; Aleor Dermaceuticals Ltd. / Panelav, Vadodara; J.B. Chemicals and Pharmaceuticals Ltd. / Karakhadi, Vadodara; Alembic Limited / Vadodara, Vadodara; Chemo Pharma Laboratories Limited / Savli, Vadodara; Zydus Cadila Healthcare Limited / Jarod, Vadodara; Alkem Laboratories Limited / Panelav, Vadodara; Genus Pharmaceuticals / Padra, Vadodara; Intas Pharmaceuticals Limited / Kadi, Vadodara; Indoco Remedies Limited / Savli, Vadodara; Sava Healthcare Limited / Savli, Vadodara; Bestochem Formulations India Limited / Vadodara, Vadodara; Shilpa Medicare Limited / Padra, Vadodara	Company name / Plant Location; Zydus Cadila Healthcare Ltd. / Ankleshwar, GIDC Industrial Estate; Glenmark Pharmaceuticals Ltd. / Ankleshwar, GIDC Industrial Estate; Sun Pharmaceutical Industries Ltd. / Ankleshwar, GIDC Industrial Estate; Torrent Pharmaceuticals Ltd. / Ankleshwar, GIDC Industrial Estate; Wockhardt Ltd. / Ankleshwar, GIDC Industrial Estate; Aurobindo Pharma Ltd. / Ankleshwar, GIDC Industrial Estate; Cadila Healthcare Ltd. / Ankleshwar, GIDC Industrial Estate; Jubilant Life Sciences Ltd. / Ankleshwar, GIDC Industrial Estate; Macleods Pharmaceuticals Ltd. / Ankleshwar, GIDC Industrial Estate; Nectar Lifesciences Ltd. / Ankleshwar, GIDC Industrial Estate; Unimark Remedies Ltd. / Ankleshwar, GIDC Industrial Estate; Resonance Laboratories Pvt. Ltd. / Ankleshwar, GIDC Industrial Estate; Eris Lifesciences Pvt. Ltd. / Ankleshwar, GIDC Industrial Estate; Indoco Remedies Ltd. / Ankleshwar, GIDC Industrial Estate; Medley Pharmaceuticals Ltd. / Ankleshwar, GIDC Industrial Estate; Meghmani Organics Ltd. / Ankleshwar, GIDC Industrial Estate; Cachet Pharmaceuticals Pvt. Ltd. / Ankleshwar, GIDC Industrial Estate; S Kant Healthcare Ltd. / Ankleshwar, GIDC Industrial Estate; Nutraplus India Ltd. / Ankleshwar, GIDC Industrial Estate; Corel Pharma Chem. / Ankleshwar, GIDC Industrial Estate; Stadmed Pvt. Ltd. / Ankleshwar, GIDC Industrial Estate; Kemwell Biopharma Pvt. Ltd. / Ankleshwar, GIDC Industrial Estate	Cluster / Companies; Bharuch / Torrent Pharmaceuticals Ltd., Lupin Ltd., Wockhardt Ltd., Zydus Cadila Healthcare Ltd., Glenmark Pharmaceuticals Ltd.; Vapi / Cipla Ltd., Aarti Drugs Ltd., IPCA Laboratories Ltd., Glenmark Pharmaceuticals Ltd., Macleods Pharmaceuticals Ltd.; Valsad / Unichem Laboratories Ltd., Cadila Pharmaceuticals Ltd., Sun Pharmaceutical Industries Ltd., Glenmark Pharmaceuticals Ltd., Zydus Cadila Healthcare Ltd., Torrent Pharmaceuticals Ltd.
Types	Finished Dosages, Contract manufacturing	Finished Dosages, Biogenerics	APIs, Formulations, Vaccines	APIs, Finished Dosages
Exports	High	High	Medium	Medium
Market/ Resource/ Infrastructure-based	Market and Infrastructure-based	Market and Infrastructure-based	Resource-based	Resource-based

== Largest companies ==
=== By market capitalization ===
Top 6 public pharmaceutical companies in Gujarat by market capitalization as of April 2023.

Rank	Company	Location	Market capitalization (April 2023)	Ref(s)
1	Torrent Pharmaceuticals	Ahmedabad	₹534 billion (US$6.3 billion)	
2	Zydus Lifesciences	Ahmedabad	₹499 billion (US$5.9 billion)	
3	Lupin	Ahmedabad	₹299.67 billion (US$3.5 billion)	
4	Alembic Pharmaceuticals	Vadodara	₹108 billion (US$1.3 billion)	
5	Eris Lifesciences	Ahmedabad	₹100 billion (US$1.2 billion)	
6	Dishman Carbogen Amcis	Ahmedabad	₹80 billion (US$950 million)	

Top private pharmaceutical companies in India by reported valuation in 2022.

Rank	Company	Location	Valuation (2022)
1	Intas Pharmaceuticals	Ahmedabad	₹593 billion (US$7.0 billion)
2	Cadila Pharmaceuticals	Ahmedabad	₹70 billion (US$830 million)

=== By sales and marketing operations within India ===
Multinational Pharmaceutical Companies ranked as per active presence of sales, marketing and business in India are as follows:

1. Pfizer
2. GlaxoSmithKline
3. Sanofi Aventis
4. Merck
5. Johnson and Johnson
6. Amgen
7. Novartis
8. Roche
1. Bristol-Myers Squibb
2. Eli Lilly and Company
3. Abbott
4. Takeda Pharmaceutical Company
5. Boehringer Ingelheim
6. Astellas

== Research and Development ==
The pharmaceutical sector in Gujarat has a significant focus on research and development (R&D), which has contributed to the growth of the industry in the state. The state government has been actively promoting R&D in the pharmaceutical sector and has established a number of initiatives to support this.

Gujarat FDCA (Food and Drugs Control Administration) Innovation and Research Cell, which was established to promote R&D in the pharmaceutical industry. The cell provides support for R&D activities and facilitates collaborations between the industry and academia.

In addition, the state government has established the Gujarat Biotechnology Research Centre (GBRC) to promote biotechnology research in the state. The centre provides infrastructure and technical support to research institutions and companies in the biotechnology sector.

The Gujarat government has also established several science and technology parks in the state, including the Gujarat Science City in Ahmedabad and the Gujarat Biotech Park in Vadodara. These parks provide infrastructure and support services to companies engaged in R&D activities in various sectors, including pharmaceuticals.

Many of the leading pharmaceutical companies in Gujarat have their own R&D facilities and are actively engaged in the development of new products and technologies. For example, Zydus Lifesciences and Intas Pharmaceuticals one of the largest pharmaceutical companies in Gujarat, has a state-of-the-art R&D facility in Ahmedabad. Similarly, Torrent Pharmaceuticals has a dedicated R&D centre in Gandhinagar.

In addition to the initiatives and facilities mentioned earlier, the Gujarat government has also established the National Institute of Pharmaceutical Education and Research to promote R&D in the pharmaceutical sector. The centre provides infrastructure and technical support to pharmaceutical companies and research institutions in the state. It also facilitates collaborations between the industry and academia, and encourages the commercialization of R&D outcomes.

The state government has also established a number of policies and incentives to promote R&D in the pharmaceutical sector. For example, the Gujarat Industrial Policy 2020 provides various incentives to companies engaged in R&D activities, including subsidies for the development of new products, tax exemptions on R&D expenditure, and funding for collaborations with academic institutions.

Gujarat government has taken the initiative to provide training in areas such as R&D, manufacturing, quality control, and regulatory affairs, and aims to develop a skilled workforce for the industry.

the government initiatives, policies, and incentives have created an environment that promotes R&D in the pharmaceutical sector in Gujarat. This has led to the development of innovative products and technologies, which has helped to establish Gujarat as a hub for the pharmaceutical industry in India.

== Exports ==
Gujarat is one of the leading states in India in terms of pharmaceutical exports. The state has a well-established pharmaceutical industry with a strong focus on quality and innovation, which has helped it to become a major exporter of pharmaceutical products. According to the data from the Ministry of Commerce and Industry, Government of India, Gujarat was the second-largest exporter of pharmaceuticals in India during the fiscal year 2020–21, accounting for around 20% of the country's total pharmaceutical exports.

Pharmaceutical exports from Gujarat, India have increased by 11% in fiscal year 2018–19, according to data provided by the Gujarat State Board of Indian Drug Manufacturers’ Association (IDMA). Gujarat accounts for a minimum of 28% of India's pharma exports, with exports totalling $5.36bn in 2018–19, up from $4.83bn the previous year. The Indian pharma industry has bounced back with an estimated export value of $19.15bn in 2018–19, an increase of 10.85% over the previous year. The sector's strong performance is partly attributed to the strengthening of the dollar against the rupee.

Gujarat's pharmaceutical exports consist of various types of products, including formulations, bulk drugs, intermediates, and drug formulations. The major markets for Gujarat's pharmaceutical exports are the United States, European Union, Africa, and the Middle East.

Year 2021–2022
Sr. No.	Districts	Commodities	Value of Export (in US$ Million)
1	Bharuch	Drugs And Pharmaceuticals	406.06
1	Bharuch	Total export of District	4695.14
2	Ahmedabad	Drugs And Pharmaceuticals	1218.54
2	Ahmedabad	Total export of District	4439.12
3	Vadodara	Drugs And Pharmaceuticals	320.65
3	Vadodara	Total export of District	3710.32
4	Valsad	Drugs And Pharmaceuticals	140.26
4	Valsad	Total export of District	1970.23

The Gujarat government has also taken several initiatives to promote pharmaceutical exports from the state. These initiatives include the establishment of pharma parks and special economic zones, providing financial incentives and subsidies for exporters, and the organization of trade fairs and exhibitions to showcase the products of the state's pharmaceutical industry.

== See also ==
- Pharmaceutical industry in India
- Economy of Gujarat
