= Pharmaceutical industry in India =

The pharmaceutical industry in India was valued at an estimated US$50 billion in FY 2023-24 and is estimated to reach $130 billion by 2030. India is often described as the “pharmacy of the world,” supplying around one-fifth of global demand for generic medicines and exporting pharmaceuticals to over 200 countries in 2023–24, with approximately 70% of exports destined for highly regulated markets such as North America and Europe. In the United States, Indian pharmaceutical companies supply nearly half of all generic prescriptions by volume. India is also the largest vaccine manufacturer globally by volume, accounting for over 60% of the world’s vaccine production.

According to Economic Survey 2023, the turnover in the domestic pharmaceutical market was estimated to be $41 billion. India's pharmaceutical exports revenue was $25.3 billion in fiscal year 2022–23, according to the data released by Pharmexcil. India ranked third globally in terms of dollar value of drugs and medicines exports.

Major pharmaceutical hubs in India are, broadly anticlockwise from the northwest: Baddi, Paonta Sahib, Sikkim, Kolkata, Visakhapatnam, Hyderabad, Bangalore, Mysore, Chennai, Pondicherry, Goa, Mumbai, Navi Mumbai, Pune, Aurangabad, Indore, Pithampur, Ahmedabad, Vadodara, Ankleshwar, and Vapi.

== Overview ==
As of 2023, the Indian pharmaceutical industry is the world's 13th largest by value and third largest in the world by volume. The industry produces over 60,000 generic drugs in different 60 therapeutic categories. India's revenue from pharmaceutical exports was $25.3 billion in the 2022-2023 financial year. In terms of the global market, India currently holds an accountable share and is known as the pharmacy of the world. The country is the largest global supplier of generic medicine. India produces more than 50% the world's vaccines. It supplies 40% of the US's demand for generic drugs. India gained its foothold on the global scene with its innovatively-engineered generic drugs and active pharmaceutical ingredients (API), The country accounts for around 30% (by volume) and about 10% (value) in the US$70–80 billion US generics market. Growth in other fields notwithstanding, generics are still a large part of the picture. The Indian pharmaceutical industry supplies over 50 per cent of the global demand for various vaccines, 40 per cent of generic demand in the US and 25 per cent of all medicine in the UK. India is the largest contributor in UNESC with over 50-60% share.

As of 2023, there are about 670 USFDA-approved manufacturing facilities in India, the highest for any country outside the US.

== Industry sector development ==
=== Government intervention ===
The Indian government established the Department of Biotechnology in 1986 under the Ministry of Science and Technology. Since then, there have been a number of dispensations offered by both the central government and various states to encourage the growth of the industry. India's science minister launched a program that provides tax incentives and grants for biotech start-ups and firms seeking to expand and establishes the Biotechnology Parks Society of India to support ten biotech parks by 2010. Previously limited to rodents, animal testing was expanded to include large animals as part of the minister's initiative. States have started to vie with one another for biotech business, and they are offering such goodies as exemption from VAT and other fees, financial assistance with patents and subsidies on everything ranging from investment to land to utilities.

The Government started to encourage the growth of drug manufacturing by Indian companies in the early 1960s, and with the Patents Act in 1970. The government has addressed the problem of educated but unqualified candidates in its Draft National Biotech Development Strategy. This plan included a proposal to create a National Task Force that will work with the biotech industry to revise the curriculum for undergraduate and graduate study in life sciences and biotechnology. The government's strategy also stated intentions to increase the number of PhD Fellowships awarded by the Department of Biotechnology to 200 per year. These human resources will be further leveraged with a "Bio-Edu-Grid" that will knit together the resources of the academic and scientific industrial communities, much as they are in the US.

The biotechnology sector faces some major challenges in its quest for growth. Chief among them is a lack of funding, particularly for firms that are just starting out. The most likely sources of funds are government grants and venture capital, which is a relatively young industry in India. Government grants are difficult to secure, and due to the expensive and uncertain nature of biotech research, venture capitalists are reluctant to invest in firms that have not yet developed a commercially viable product.

=== Incentives for R&D, product development and high-value production ===
Government of India has launched a Production Linked Incentive (PLI) Scheme for Pharmaceuticals with provision for disbursal of US$2 billion or ₹15,000 crore government incentives, which will run from 2020–21 to 2028–29, to reduce import dependence, benefit domestic manufacturers, boost product diversification and innovation for development of complex and high-tech products especially in in vitro diagnostic devices and emerging technologies especially in cell based or gene therapy, employment generation and production of wide range of lower cost affordable medicines for consumers with the aim to achieve incremental sales of US$4 billion or INR 29,400 crore and incremental exports of US$2.7 billion or INR 19,600 crore between 2022–23 to 2027–28.

=== Manufacture of API supplies in India ===
To eliminate the dependence on China after the 2017 China–India border standoff to foster an Atmanirbhar Bharat, in July 2021 India's Council of Scientific and Industrial Research (CSIR) initiated a Make in India program in collaboration with the coal and petroleum industries of India to end-to-end manufacture 56 prioritised active pharmaceutical ingredient (API) for the essential medicines. In 2016–17, China was the largest supplier of API to India with 66% share by volume of API raw material supplies to India worth US$2.4 billion or INR 18,000 crore, followed by US$1.6 billion API imported from Germany, the US, Italy and Singapore are other major suppliers to India.

=== Foreign investment ===
Per India's Consolidated FDI Policy, 2020 (the "FDI Policy"), foreign direct investment ("FDI") in the pharmaceutical sector in greenfield (new) projects is permitted up to 100% without the approval of the Department of Pharmaceuticals (the "DoP"). In brownfield (existing) projects, FDI exceeding 74% requires the investor to seek prior approval from the DoP in compliance with the prescribed conditions under the FDI Policy.

Separately, FDI up to 100% is permitted for the manufacturing of medical devices for both greenfield and brownfield projects without the approval of the DoP.

An FDI approval from the DoP can be obtained within a period of ten to twelve weeks from the date of the application, depending on the completeness of the documentation submitted by the investor in support of the application, failing which, this timeline could vary.

=== Relation between pharma and biotech ===
India's biopharmaceutical industry clocked a 17% growth with revenues of Rs. 137 billion ($1.8 billion) in the 2009-10 financial year over the previous fiscal. Bio-pharma was the biggest contributor generating 60 percent of the industry's growth at Rs. 8,829 crore, followed by bio-services at Rs. 2,639 crore and bio-agri at Rs. 1,936 crore. Indian companies carved a niche in both the Indian and world markets with their expertise in reverse-engineering new processes for manufacturing drugs at low costs which became the advantage for industry.

Unlike in other countries, the difference between biotechnology and pharmaceuticals remains fairly defined in India, with biotech a much smaller part of the economy. India accounted for 2% of the $41 billion global biotech market and in 2003 was ranked 3rd in the Asia-Pacific region and 13th in the world in number of biotech. In 2004–5, the Indian biotech industry saw its revenues grow 37% to $1.1 billion. The Indian biotech market is dominated by biopharmaceuticals; 76% of 2004–5 revenues came from biopharmaceuticals, which saw 30% growth last year. Of the revenues from biopharmaceuticals, vaccines led the way, comprising 47% of sales. Biologics and large-molecule drugs tend to be more expensive than small-molecule drugs, and India hopes to sweep the market in bio-generics and contract manufacturing as drugs go off patent and Indian companies upgrade their manufacturing capabilities.

Most companies in the biotech sector are extremely small, with only two firms breaking 100 million dollars in revenues. At last count there were 265 firms registered in India, over 92% of which were incorporated in the last five years. The newness of the companies explains the industry's high consolidation in both physical and financial terms. Almost 30% of all biotech are in or around Bangalore, and the top ten companies capture 47% of the market. The top five companies were homegrown; Indian firms account for 72% of the bio-pharma sector and 52% of the industry as a whole.[4,46] The Association of Biotechnology-Led Enterprises (ABLE) is aiming to grow the industry to $5 billion in revenues generated by 1 million employees by 2009, and data from the Confederation of Indian Industry (CII) seem to suggest that it is possible.

=== Comparison with the United States ===
The Indian biotech sector parallels that of the US in many ways. Both are filled with small start-ups while the majority of the market is controlled by a few powerful companies. Both are dependent upon government grants and venture capitalists for funding because neither will be commercially viable for years. Pharmaceutical companies in both countries see growth potential in biotechnology and have either invested in existing start-ups or ventured into the field themselves.

== Research and product development ==
=== Product development ===
Indian companies are also starting to adapt their product development processes to the new environment. For years, firms have made their ways into the global market by researching generic competitors to patented drugs and following up with litigation to challenge the patent. This approach remains untouched by the new patent regime and looks to increase in the future. However, those that can afford it have set their sights on an even higher goal: new molecule discovery. Although the initial investment is huge, companies are lured by the promise of hefty profit margins and thus a legitimate competitor in the global industry. Local firms have slowly been investing more money into their R&D programs or have formed alliances to tap into these opportunities. To push for further R&D the government is planning to introduce a Research Linked Incentive (RLI) Scheme on the lines of Production Linked Incentive Scheme to encourage development of new medical products.

=== Patents ===
In 1970, Indira Gandhi enacted legislation which barred medical products from being patented in the country. In 1994, 162 countries including India signed the Trade-Related Aspects of Intellectual Property Rights (TRIPS) agreement, which stipulated that patents had to be given to all inventions including medicines. India and other developing countries were provided an extra ten years to comply fully with the conditions mandated by TRIPS. India succeeded in including a crucial clause to the agreement in the form of the right to grant compulsory licenses (CLs) to others to manufacture drugs in cases where the government felt that the patent holder was not serving the public health interest. This right was used in 2012, when Natco was granted a CL to produce Nexavar, a cancer drug. In 2005, a provision was added to the new legislation as section 3(d) which stipulated that a medicine could not be patented if it did not result in "the enhancement of the known efficacy of that substance".

A significant change in intellectual property protection in India was 1 January 2005 enactment of an amendment to India's patent law that reinstated product patents for the first time since 1972. The legislation took effect on the deadline set by the WTO's Trade-Related Aspects of Intellectual Property Rights (TRIPS) agreement, which mandated patent protection on both products and processes for a period of 20 years. Under this new law, India will be forced to recognise not only new patents but also any patents filed after 1 January 1995.

In December 2005, the TRIPS pact was amended to incorporate specific safeguards to ensure that the public health concerns of affordability and accessibility for a large section of people in developing countries was not compromised. These amendments came into force only in January 2017, however, after two-thirds of the member countries ratified them. In the domestic market, this new patent legislation has resulted in fairly clear segmentation. The multinationals narrowed their focus onto high-end patents who make up only 12% of the market, taking advantage of their newly bestowed patent protection. Meanwhile, Indian firms have chosen to take their existing product portfolios and target semi-urban and rural populations.

== Types of companies ==
The Indian pharmaceutical industry has 5 important segments; contract research and manufacturing services (CRAMS), active pharmaceutical ingredients (APIs), formulations, biologics and biosimilars, and vaccines. Various types of companies are within these segments.

=== Formulations ===
India is considered globally as a high-quality generic medicines manufacturer. Most of India's largest pharmaceutical companies manufacture and export generic medicines, and are among the largest generic medicine companies globally. These companies include Sun Pharma, which is India's largest and the world's fourth largest specialty generics pharmaceutical company. Cipla, another large Indian pharmaceutical company, is noted for its pioneering role in manufacturing and exporting low-cost generic HIV/AIDS drugs to developing countries. As of 2021, Lupin is the third largest pharmaceutical company in India by prescriptions.

=== Active pharmaceutical ingredients (APIs) ===
As of 2021, India's APIs market is worth $11.8 billion and is forecasted to grow at a compound annual growth rate of 12.24% until 2027. Several Indian companies manufacture APIs. One of India's largest pharmaceutical companies, Divi's Laboratories, is the world's largest manufacturer of more than 10 generic APIs. Laurus Labs supplies APIs to 9 out of the 10 largest generic pharmaceutical companies, and is a leading producer of APIs for antiretroviral, cardiovascular and oncology drugs. Piramal Pharma, a company that is part of the Piramal Group, develops and manufactures peptide APIs.

=== Contract research and manufacturing services (CRAMS) ===
India has a rapidly growing CRAMS sector. Several Indian companies offer CRAMS services, which also includes contract development and manufacturing (CDMO) services. Most of India's CRAMS companies and contract manufacturing organizations (CMO) operate in the small molecules segment. Laurus labs offers biologics and fermentation CDMO services. Divi's Laboratories's CDMO client's include 6 of the top 10 largest multinational pharmaceutical companies. Syngene, a subsidiary of Biocon, offers CRAMS small molecules APIs and biologics. Piramal Pharma, through its investment in Yapan Bio offers CDMO services for biologics which include vaccines, gene therapies, and monoclonal antibodies. Suven Pharmaceuticals offers services across the entire CDMO value chain with both intermediates & API related CDMO services. The company is also among the top five CDMO companies in India who supply high quality intermediaries to innovator companies.

=== Biologics and biosimilars ===
As of 2021, India controls only 8% of the world's biopharmaceutical market. India's domestic biosimilars market is projected to be valued at US$35 billion by 2030. Biocon is India's largest and fully-integrated biopharmaceutical company. In 2021, Biocon Biologics, a subsidiary of Biocon, received USFDA approval for Semglee, which is the first interchangeable biosimilar insulin glargine. Another subsidiary of Biocon, Biocon Sdn Bhd, built Asia's largest integrated insulin manufacturing and R&D facility in Malaysia, with a $300 million investment. Sun Pharma has stated that it intends to look at opportunities in the third wave of bio-pharmaceuticals that are going off patent in 2026–27. Intas Pharmaceuticals is a large company in the global biosimilar monoclonal antibodies market.

=== Vaccines ===
As of 2021, India is the world's largest manufacturing region for vaccines. In 2021, the World Health Organization (WHO) stated that India has more than a 40% of the global market share in vaccines. Serum Institute of India (SII) is the world's largest vaccine manufacturer by volume. SII manufactured Covishield, the Oxford-AstraZeneca COVID-19 vaccine, which is the most administered COVID-19 vaccine in India. SII and MassBiologics, part of the University of Massachusetts Chan Medical School, developed Rabishield, a first of its kind rabies human monoclonal antibody. Bharat Biotech, in collobartion with the Indian Council of Medical Research (ICMR) - National Institute of Virology (NIV), developed Covaxin, India's first COVID-19 vaccine. Bharat Biotech is also one of the first companies to develop vaccines for the Zika and Chikungunya viruses. Zydus Lifesciences developed the world's first human DNA COVID-19 vaccine and India's second indigenous COVID-19 Vaccine.

=== Largest companies ===
==== By market capitalization ====
Top 10 public pharmaceutical companies in India by market capitalization as of May 2024.

Rank	Company	Market capitalization (May 2024)
1	Sun Pharma	₹366,456 crore (US$39 billion)
2	Cipla	₹113,515 crore (US$12 billion)
3	Dr. Reddy's Laboratories	₹103,161 crore (US$11 billion)
4	Divi's Laboratories	₹100,366 crore (US$11 billion)
5	Zydus Lifesciences	₹97,958 crore (US$10 billion)
6	Torrent Pharmaceuticals	₹89,704 crore (US$9.6 billion)
7	Mankind Pharma	₹87,939 crore (US$9.4 billion)
8	Lupin	₹74,670 crore (US$8.0 billion)
9	Aurobindo Pharma	₹67,837 crore (US$7.2 billion)
10	Alkem Laboratories	₹62,472 crore (US$6.7 billion)

Top 5 private pharmaceutical companies in India by reported valuation in 2023.

Rank	Company	Valuation (2023)
1	Serum Institute of India	₹192,300 crore (US$21 billion)
2	Intas Pharmaceuticals	₹61,900 crore (US$6.6 billion)
3	Macleods Pharmaceuticals	₹41,700 crore (US$4.5 billion)
4	Hetero Labs	₹24,100 crore (US$2.6 billion)
5	Aristo Pharma	₹23,000 crore (US$2.5 billion)

==== By sales and marketing operations within India ====
Multinational Pharmaceutical Companies ranked as per active presence of sales, marketing and business in India are as follows:

1. Pfizer
2. GSK
3. Sanofi
4. Merck
5. Johnson & Johnson
6. Amgen
7. Novartis
8. Roche
1. Bristol-Myers Squibb
2. Eli Lilly and Company
3. Abbott
4. Takeda Pharmaceutical Company
5. Boehringer Ingelheim
6. Astellas

== Exports ==
Exports of pharmaceuticals products from India increased from US$6.23 billion in 2006–07 to US$8.7 billion in 2008-09 a combined annual growth rate of 21.25%.

India exported $11.7 billion worth of pharmaceuticals in 2014. Pharmaceutical export from India stood at US$17.27 billion in 2017–18, and is expected to grow by 30 per cent to reach US$20 billion by 2020.And India Share in This 40% The 10 countries below imported 56.5% of that total:

Rank	Country	Value (US$ millions)	Share
1	United States	$3800	32.9%
2	South Africa	$461.1	3.9%
3	Russia	$447.9	3.8%
4	United Kingdom	$444.9	3.8%
5	Nigeria	$385.4	3.3%
6	Kenya	$233.9	2%
7	Tanzania	$225.2	1.9%
8	Brazil	$212.7	1.8%
9	Australia	$182.1	1.6%
10	Germany	$178.8	1.5%

== Criticism ==
A March 2025 investigation by Vidya Krishnan and Arshu John in Himal Southasian examined weaknesses in India's pharmaceutical regulatory system, documenting cases of spurious medicines, gaps in enforcement and loopholes that can undermine drug safety.

=== Scandals ===
In 2022, toxic cough syrups made by two companies in India were linked to the deaths of 70 children in The Gambia and 19 in Uzbekistan. According to the World Health Organization (WHO), the products had excess levels of diethylene glycol.

On 5 October 2022, the World Health Organization issued a medical product alert that was linked to acute kidney injuries, and the deaths of 69 children in the Republic of the Gambia. The four substances that were issued the medical product alert were: Promethazine Oral Solution, Kofexmalin Baby Cough Syrup, Makoff Baby Cough syrup, and Magrip N Cold Syrup. These medications were produced by Maiden Pharmaceuticals Limited, in India. The medical alert was issued as the World Health Organization claimed that after sampling batches and conducting laboratory analysis its investigators had found that these products had "unacceptable levels of diethylene glycol." The WHO also claimed that while these products were only found in the Gambia, they may have been exported to other countries through informal markets.

=== Patents ===
It has been pointed out that the pharma industry is not scrutinized enough when it comes to withdrawing patent challenges. An example of this lies in the case of the patent application filed by Gilead Sciences for the Hepatitis C medicine sofosbuvir.

For context, Sofosbuvir (brand name: Sovaldi) was listed at $1,000 per pill in the United States. Patients group desired that this medication be off a patent, to ensure more affordable distribution of the drug. Because India's patent laws allow a third party to dispute a pending patent, in 2014, it was claimed that Natco initially filed a "pre-grant opposition" with the patent authority. However, a month after signing a voluntary licensing agreement with Gilead, Natco withdrew the patent challenge.

In 2015, Gilead Sciences's patent was rejected by the Indian Patent Authority on the basis that there were little changes to the formulation of the drug. This decision was then appealed by Gilead Sciences, and subsequently the Indian Patent Office in New Delhi approved the drug. After receiving exclusivity with the patent, Gilead Sciences stated that the patent would not stop the availability of the drug, mentioning that they had a voluntary licensing program with generic manufacturers in India to distribute the drug.

It has been argued that Mylan (an influential pharmaceutical company which was Natco's client) exerted pressure on Natco and 'brokered' a deal, though the term 'brokered' has been refuted by Mylan.

=== Quality ===
- Between 2015 and 2017, there were 31 FDA warning letters to Indian pharmaceutical companies citing serious Data Integrity issues, including data deletion, manipulation or fabrication of test results.
- According to Outsourcing Pharma in 2012, 75% of counterfeit drugs supplied world over had some origins in India, followed by 7% from Egypt and 6% from China. The Central Drug Standards Control Organisation (CDSCO), the drug regulatory authority of India conducted a nationwide survey in 2009 and announced that of "24,000 samples [that] were collected from all over India and tested. It was found that only 11 samples or 0.046% were spurious." In 2017 a similar survey found 3.16% of the medicines sampled were substandard and 0.0245% were fake.

== See also ==
- Generic medicine in India
- Ayurveda
- Healthcare in India
- Medical tourism in India
- Opium and Alkaloid Works
- Contract Research Organization
- Genome Valley
- Pharmaceutical industry in Gujarat
- Uniform Code of Pharmaceutical Marketing Practices 2024
