= Formulation (disambiguation) =

Formulation may refer to:

- Clinical formulation
- Formulations (general discussion about formulations, its manipulations, principles and computations)
- Pharmaceutical formulation:
  - Galenic formulation
- Pesticide formulation
- Mathematical formulation
