= Torrent Group =

Indian multinational conglomerate

- Type: Corporate group
- Industry: Conglomerate
- Founded: 1959; 67 years ago
- Founder: Uttambhai Nathalal Mehta
- Headquarters: Ahmedabad, Gujarat, India
- Area served: Worldwide
- Key people: Samir Mehta (Chairman); Sudhir Mehta (Chairman emeritus)
- Subsidiaries: Torrent Pharmaceuticals; Torrent Power; Torrent Gas; Torrent Electricals; Gujarat Titans

Torrent Group is an Indian multinational conglomerate, based in Ahmedabad, India. It was founded by Uttambhai Nathalal Mehta, and now run by his sons, Sudhir and Samir Mehta. The core businesses of the group are gas, pharmaceuticals and power. As of September 2024, it has market capitalization of $25 billion.

== Subsidiaries ==
The various companies under the Torrent banner are:

- Torrent Cables - cable manufacturing company based in Ahmedabad.
- Torrent Pharmaceuticals – One of the largest pharmaceutical companies of India. It has four manufacturing plants: (a) Chhatral, Gujarat (b) Baddi, Himachal Pradesh (c) Gangtok, Sikkim and (d) Dahej, Gujarat. It has a research centre at Bhat, near Ahmedabad in Gujarat.
- Torrent Power – Responsible for generation, transmission and distribution of power to the cities of Ahmedabad and Surat in Gujarat. The company has taken up distribution of electricity in Bhiwandi, Maharashtra and Agra and Kanpur in Uttar Pradesh. Torrent Cables, which was formed by taking over from ailing Mahindra Electricals, was merged with Torrent Power in 2015. It manufactures up to 132KV XLPE cables.
- Torrent Gas – Torrent Gas is engaged in city gas distribution business in 16 geographical areas spread across 32 districts in 7 states and 1 union territory in India.
- Gujarat Titans – Indian Premier League team. In 2025, Torrent Group acquired a 67% stake in Gujarat Titans for ₹5,000 crore.

=== Torrent Power ===
Torrent Power Limited
- Type: Public
- Traded as: BSE: 532779; NSE: TORNTPOWR
- ISIN: INE813H01021
- Industry: Energy
- Founded: 1996; 30 years ago
- Headquarters: Ahmedabad, Gujarat, India
- Key people: Sudhir Mehta; Samir Mehta
- Products: Sale and distribution, electricity generation and distribution, wind power, energy and power trading
- Revenue: ▲₹34,425 crore (US$3.6 billion) (FY 2025)
- Operating income: ▲₹5,810 crore (US$600 million) (FY 2025)
- Net income: ▲₹3,059 crore (US$320 million) (FY 2025)
- Number of employees: 8,000 (2024)
- Parent: Torrent Group
- Website: www.torrentpower.com

Torrent Power is an Indian energy and power company, having interests in power generation, transmission, distribution and the manufacturing and supply of power cables. The company distributes power to over 38.5 lakh customers annually in its distribution areas of Ahmedabad, Gandhinagar, Surat, Dahej SEZ and Dholera Special Investment Region in Gujarat; Dadra and Nagar Haveli and Daman and Diu UT; Bhiwandi, Shil, Mumbra and Kalwa areas of Mumbai Metropolitan Region in Maharashtra and Agra in Uttar Pradesh; The T&D losses in license areas of the company is amongst the lowest in the country.

==== Operations ====
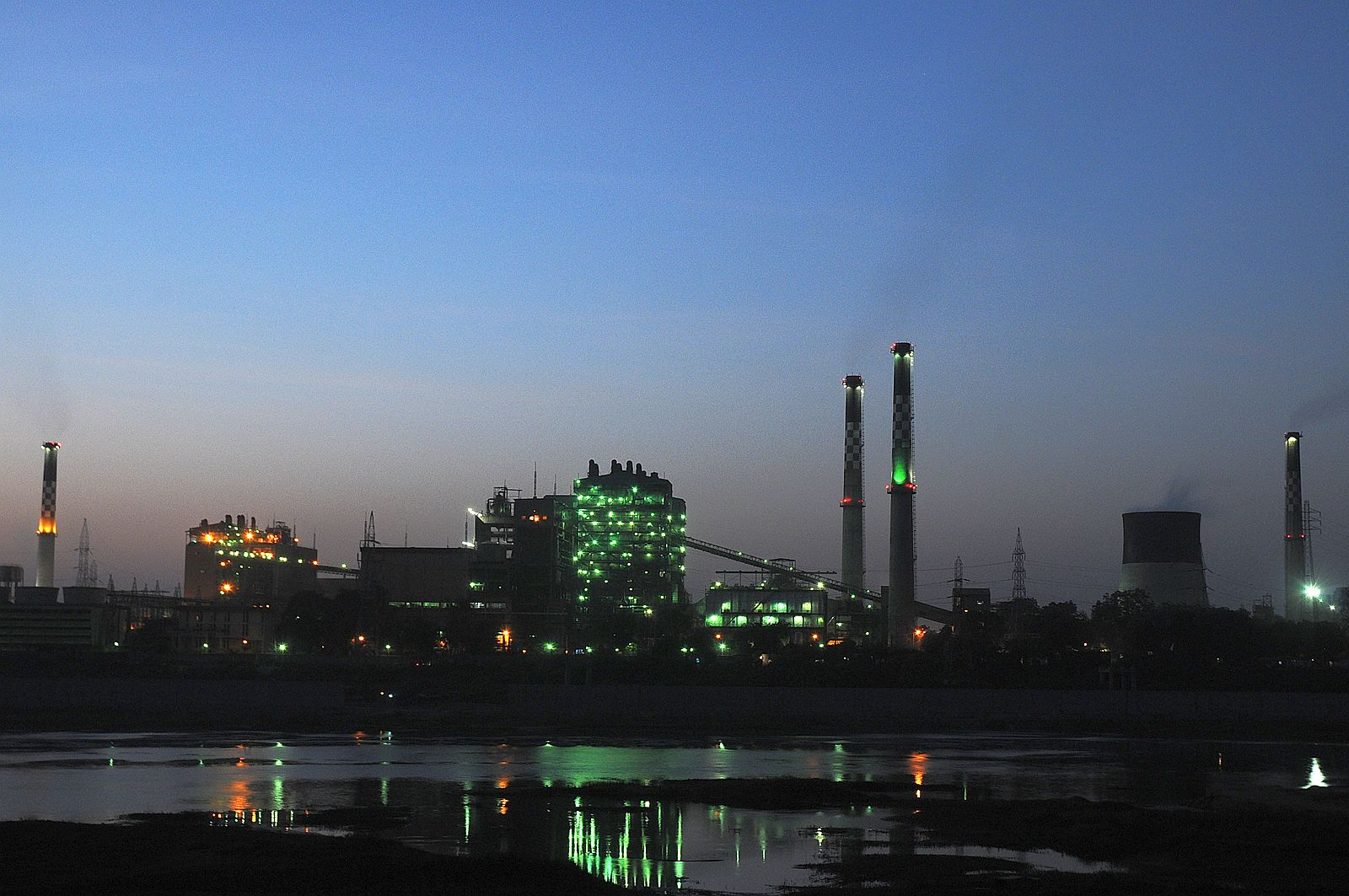
Torrent Power thermal power station at Sabarmati, Ahmedabad. It is one of the oldest thermal plants in India (1934)

Torrent Power has an aggregate generating capacity of 5,039 MW with a unique mix of coal based, gas based, and renewable power plants comprising:

- 1530 MW (4 Single Shaft Units of 382.5 MW each) SUGEN gas based mega combined cycle power plant in Akhakhol village near Surat - largest private sector gas based power plant in India.
- 1200 MW (3 Single Shaft Units of 400 MW each) DGEN gas based mega combined cycle power plant in Dahej SEZ.
- 362 MW (1 unit of 120 MW and 2 units of 121 MW each) coal based Sabarmati Thermal Power Station at Sabarmati, Ahmedabad
- 1947 MW Renewable plants (Wind - 921 MW and Solar - 1026 MW) spread across Jamnagar, Charanka, Akhakhol near Surat, Kutch, Rajkot, Bhavnagar in Gujarat; Gulbarga & Raichur in Karnataka and Osmanabad in Maharashtra.

Torrent Power operates 400 kV double circuit transmission lines implemented by it, for evacuating power generated at SUGEN and DGEN plant to various off-take centres.

- SUGEN to Ahmedabad Distribution Area - 400 KV Double Circuit Line to PGCIL's Pirana Substation in Ahmedabad implemented through Torrent Power Grid Limited, a Joint venture with PGCIL in which Torrent has 74% stake.
- SUGEN to Surat Distribution Area and to GETCO - 3 x 220 KV dedicated transmission lines to cater to power requirements of Surat distribution area and 220 KV line to Kim substation of GETCO.
- DGEN to PGCIL's Navsari sub-station - 400 kV Double Circuit line
- Other transmission networks include 220/132 kV transmission system in Ahmedabad distribution area.

The company distributes power to over 3.85 million customers annually in its distribution areas of Ahmedabad, Gandhinagar, Surat, Dahej SEZ and Dholera SIR in Gujarat; Dadra and Nagar Haveli and Daman and Diu UT; Bhiwandi, Shil, Mumbra and Kalwa areas of Mumbai Metropolitan Region in Maharashtra; and Agra in Uttar Pradesh. The T&D losses in license areas of the company is amongst the lowest in the country. The T&D losses in Gujarat at 6.54% is amongst the lowest in the country. Torrent Power has managed reduction in AT&C losses in Bhiwandi from 58% at the time of takeover to 14.90% in FY 2018–19, and from 58.77% at the time of takeover to 16.11% in FY 2018-19 in Agra.

=== Torrent Cables ===
The Cables Unit manufactures Power & Control Cables and is one of the market leaders in HT Power Cable segment with a manufacturing capability of up to 132 kV XLPE Cables.

== History ==
Torrent Group took over and successfully turned around an ailing power cable company Mahendra Electricals, renaming it as 'Torrent Cables Ltd.' (now merged with Torrent Power w.e.f. 1 April 2014). The high points of Torrent's foray into power however were the acquisitions of two of India's oldest utilities – The Surat Electricity Company Ltd and The Ahmedabad Electricity Company Ltd. In 1997, the company completed its acquisition of the Ahmedabad Electricity Company by purchasing the entire 28.89% stake held by the Gujarat government. This acquisition formed what was then known as Torrent Power AEC Limited. Similarly, Torrent Power SEC Limited was formed after acquiring the Surat Electricity Company in the same deal. Torrent turned them into first-rate power utilities, in terms of operational efficiencies and reliability of power supply.

In 2005, Torrent Group floated the company Torrent Power Generation to further expand into the power business. In 2006, the three power-related companies of Torrent Group, Torrent Power AEC Ltd, Torrent Power SEC Ltd, and Torrent Power Generation Ltd were merged to form Torrent Power.

Torrent Power created history by entering into the country's first distribution franchisee agreement with Maharashtra State Electricity Distribution Company Limited for Bhiwandi Circle in December 2006. In 2009 it was awarded the distribution franchise for Agra in Uttar Pradesh. During FY 19 the Company was awarded a distribution license for Dholera Special Investment Region (in Gujarat) and distribution franchise for Shil, Mumbra & Kalwa (SMK) area in Mumbai Metropolitan Region of Maharashtra.
