= Alembic (disambiguation) =

An alembic is an alchemical still.

Alembic may also refer to:

- Alembic (computer graphics), a computer graphics file format
- Alembic (database tool), a database migrations tool written by the author of SQLAlchemy
- Alembic (magazine), a British poetry magazine
- Alembic, Michigan
- Alembic Inc, an American manufacturer of high-end electric basses, guitars and preamps
- Alembic Group, an Indian conglomerate
  - Alembic Pharmaceuticals, a subsidiary
