= Agglomeration =

Agglomeration may refer to:

- Urban agglomeration, in standard English
- Megalopolis, in Chinese English, as defined in China's Standard for basic terminology of urban planning (GB/T 50280—98)
  - Megalopolises in China also known as "city clusters"
- Economies of agglomeration, an economic principle regarding geographic concentration of industries
- A subcategory of Flocculation
- Oil agglomeration
- Agglomeration, a term used by philosopher Bernard Williams

== See also ==
- pages mentioning "Agglomeration"
- Agglomerate
- pages mentioning "Agglomerate" (without stemming)
- pages mentioning "Agglom*"
- Conglomerate (disambiguation)
