= Laurus Labs =

Indian pharmaceutical company

Laurus Labs Limited
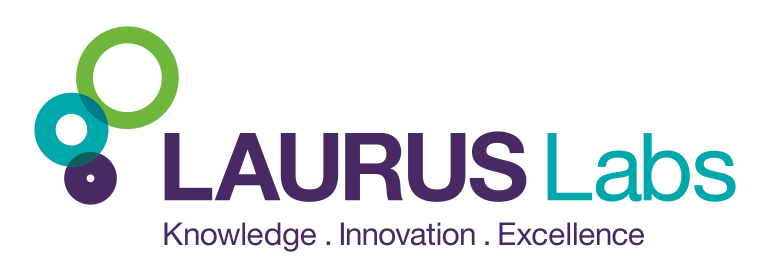

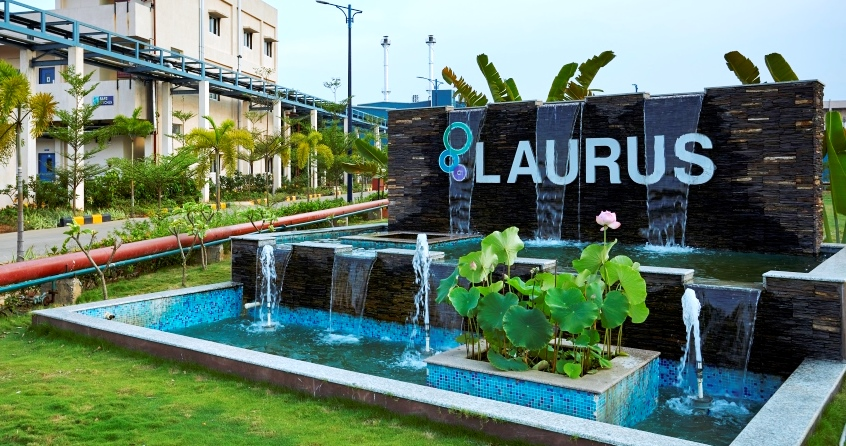
- Laurus Labs manufacturing facility in Visakhapatnam
- Company type: Public
- Traded as: NSE: LAURUSLABS; BSE: 540222
- Industry: Pharmaceuticals
- Founded: 2005; 21 years ago
- Founder: Satyanarayana Chava
- Headquarters: Hyderabad, Telangana, India
- Number of locations: 6
- Area served: Global
- Key people: Satyanarayana Chava (CEO); Vantaram Venkata Ravi Kumar (CFO)
- Products: Formulations; Active pharmaceutical ingredients Speciality Chemicals, Agro Chemicals
- Services: Custom synthesis Contract development and manufacturing organization Fermentation
- Revenue: ▲₹6,040 crore (US$630 million) (FY23)
- Net income: ▼₹796 crore (US$83 million) (FY23)
- Number of employees: 5,700 (2022)
- Subsidiaries: Laurus Synthesis
- Website: www.lauruslabs.com

Laurus Labs is an Indian multinational pharmaceutical and biotechnology company headquartered in Hyderabad. Its focus areas include active pharmaceutical ingredients (APIs), generic formulations, custom synthesis (CDMO), biotechnology, veterinary APIs and agrochemicals. The company was founded in 2005 by Satyanarayana Chava.

Laurus Labs has its eight manufacturing plants located at Visakhapatnam, Hyderabad and Bangalore. The manufacturing units have received one or more approvals from USFDA, WHO, NIP Hungary, KFDA, MHRA, TGA, and PMDA. The company operates through its subsidiaries in Europe and United States and also offers its services in contract research, clinical research and analytical research through its R&D centers. The R&D centres are based in Hyderabad, Visakhapatnam and United States.

== Business divisions ==
The company has 4 business divisions, which are generic formulation (FDF), generic APIs, contract development and manufacturing (CDMO)-Synthesis, biotechnology and speciality chemicals.

=== Generic formulation (FDF) ===
In March 2020, Laurus Labs received US Food and Drug Administration approval to market hydroxychloroquine tablets. The company announced that it would supply hydroxychloroquine for clinical trials of preventive treatment of COVID-19.

=== Generic APIs ===
Laurus Labs claims to be the "world's largest third party API supplier for anti-retrovirals" and has one of the largest HiPotent API capacities in India The company also makes Dolutegravir/lamivudine/tenofovir, a medication for HIV/AIDS, and hydroxychloroquine tablets, which are used to treat certain types of malaria.

The company also manufactures oncology and cardiovascular APIs. Laurus Labs supplies (APIs) to nine of the 10 largest generic pharma companies in the world.

=== CDMO-Synthesis ===
Laurus Synthesis is the company's CDMO subsidiary. The US, European Union and Japan are the three most important markets for Laurus Synthesis.

=== Laurus Bio ===
Laurus Bio is the company's biotechnology subsidiary. Laurus Labs entered the biotechnology sector in 2020, by acquiring the Indian biotech company, Richcore. Post the acquisition, Richcore was renamed to Laurus Bio Pvt Ltd, and became a subsidiary of Laurus Labs. As of 2022, Laurus Bio has put into operation a 180 kilolitre fermentation capacity in food proteins.
