= Intas Pharmaceuticals =

Indian multinational pharmaceutical company

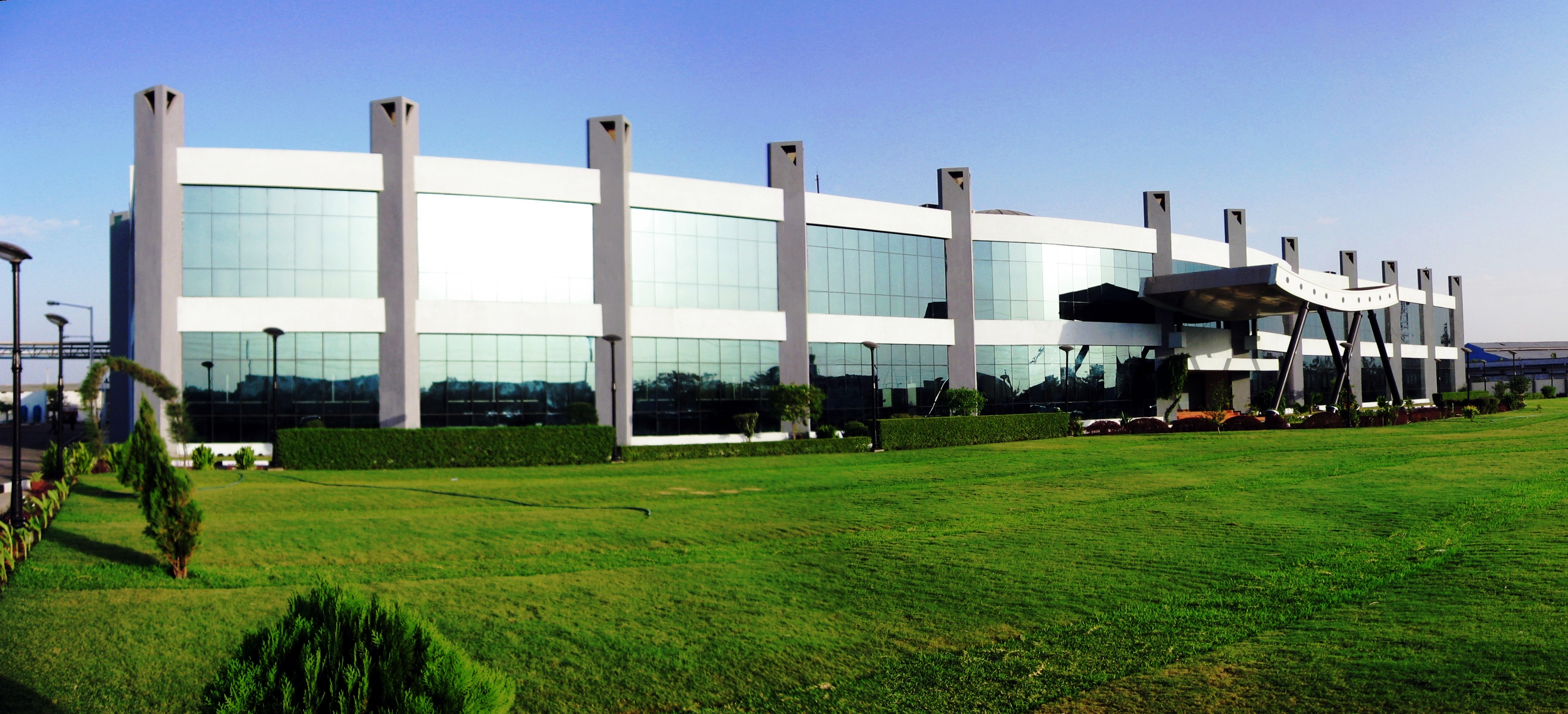
- Headquarters of Intas Biopharmaceuticals (IBPL)
- Type: Private
- Industry: Pharmaceuticals; Biopharmaceuticals
- Founded: 1976; 50 years ago
- Founder: Hasmukh Chudgar
- Headquarters: Ahmedabad, Gujarat, India
- Area served: Worldwide
- Key people: Binish Chudgar (Chairman and MD); Nimish Chudgar (Vice Chairman and MD); Urmish Chudgar (MD)
- Products: Pharmaceutical drugs, generic drugs, antiviral drugs, over-the-counter drugs, vaccines,
- Revenue: ▲₹28,200 crore (US$3.0 billion) (FY26)
- Number of employees: 25,000+ (2026)
- Subsidiaries: Accord Healthcare
- Website: www.intaspharma.com

Intas Pharmaceuticals Limited is an Indian multinational pharmaceutical company headquartered in Ahmedabad. It is a producer of generic therapeutic drugs and engaged in contract clinical research and manufacturing. It has 22 manufacturing plants, 17 in India and the rest in Greece, United Kingdom and Mexico. In the financial year 2019, 69% of the company's revenue came from international markets while 31% came from India. Its market presence is in more than 100+ countries.

== History ==
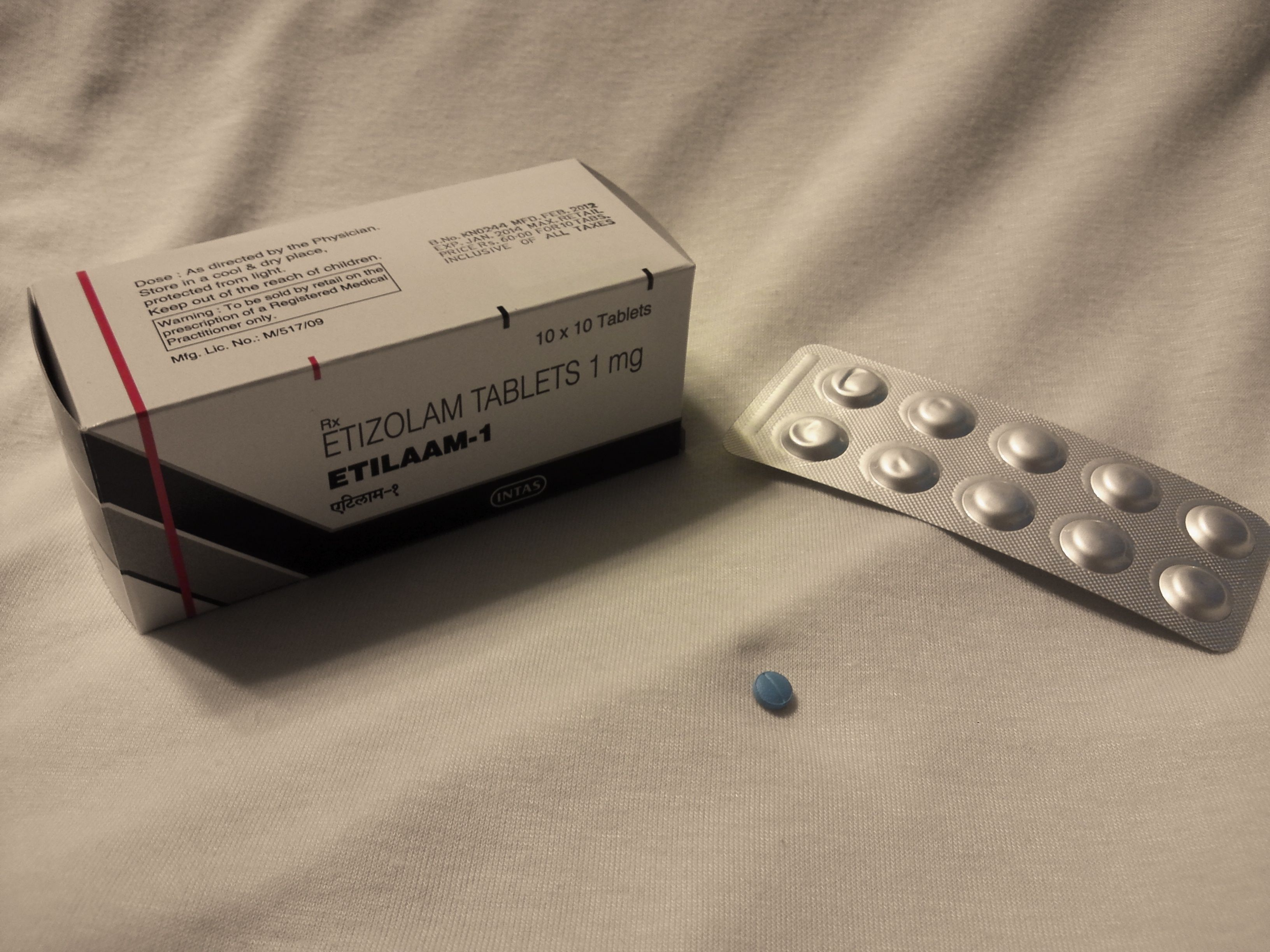
Etizolam tablets manufactured by Intas.

The company was founded by a Jain pharmacist Hasmukh Chudgar in 1977 and was incorporated in 1985.

In 2013, ChrysCapital acquired 16.14% stake in the company, and in 2015, ChrysCapital subsequently sold 10.13% to Singapore-based Temasek Holdings and in 2017, it further diluted 3.01% stake to Capital International. Though, by May 2020, ChrysCapital bought back Capital International's stake. Currently, the Chudgar family, owns 83.85% stake in the company, with 10.13% being held by Temasek Holdings, and 6.02% by ChrysCapital.

As of March 2021, the company is operating 19 manufacturing facilities globally - 13 in India, 5 in the UK, and 1 in Mexico. The company has set up a new manufacturing facility in PHARMEZ (Bavla, near Ahmedabad) with capacity to manufacture and export more than 1 billion solid dosages and 5 million injectables.

== Divisions ==
=== Biologics Unit (formerly, Intas Biopharmaceuticals) ===
In 2000, an independent biotechnology division of Intas Pharmaceuticals was incorporated as Intas Biopharmaceuticals by Urmish Chudgar, a hematologist. Later in 2012–13, the subsidiary was merged with the parent company Intas Pharmaceuticals Limited. This division is involved in development and manufacturing of biosimilar products based on recombinant DNA and monoclonal antibodies.

The company underwent an EU GMP (Good Manufacturing Practice) audit in December 2006 to seek approval for a clinical trial of its biosimilar Filgrastim in Europe and was certified as EU GMP-compliant in April 2007, becoming the first company in India to receive such certification. In 2015, the company launched its first biosimilar product, Filgrastim in Europe, to treat patients with advanced HIV infection and immune system disorders such as neutropenia.

Apart from EU GMP certification, the company has approvals from MCC South Africa, Gulf Cooperation Council (GCC), Syria, Yemen, Belarus and several other national health authorities for its manufacturing facility and products.

== Subsidiaries ==
=== Accord Healthcare ===
London-headquartered Accord Healthcare is a fully owned subsidiary of Intas Pharmaceuticals, which deals with large-scale generic pharmaceuticals across Europe and North America markets. It also manages an American R&D unit which is located at Research Triangle Park, Durham. As of 2018, the company has approval for 89 Abbreviated New Drug Applications and is selling 255 dosing presentations.

== Acquisitions ==
=== Teva Pharmaceuticals (UK & Ireland) ===
In 2016, Intas acquired the assets of Teva Pharmaceuticals in the UK and Ireland for US$764 million.

=== Actavis (UK & Ireland) ===
In 2017, the company's Accord Healthcare announced acquisition of Actavis UK Ltd. and Actavis Ireland Ltd from Teva Pharmaceutical Industries, for an enterprise value of £603 million. The deal included a portfolio of generic medicines and a manufacturing plant in Barnstaple.

=== Sanofi's Fawdon Plant ===
In 2018, Intas' subsidiary Accord Healthcare reopened Sanofi's Fawdon plant in the UK for manufacturing generic effervescent medicines. The plant was acquired in 2015 after Sanofi closed the facility. This is the fifth manufacturing location for Accord in the country after Harrow, Barnstaple, Haverhill, and Didcot.

== Controversies ==
In December 2020, Intas Pharmaceuticals, along with Mankind Pharma, received show-cause notices for selling an anti-diabetic medicine without obtaining mandatory price approval from the National Pharmaceutical Pricing Authority.

In December 2022, a U.S. FDA inspection found that Intas's manufacturing plant in Sanand, India, was intentionally falsifying laboratory data and destroying critical quality-control records. Inspectors documented a truckload of shredded test records and multiple instances of manipulated results, raising concerns about the reliability of the potency and purity of drugs released from the facility.

In 2023, testing conducted on behalf of the American military by the independent laboratory Valisure found that generic tacrolimus produced by Intas did not perform as an equivalent substitute for the brand-name version, adding to concerns about quality control at the company. Another study in 2015 had concluded that tacrolimus produced by Accord did not work as intended, yet it remained on the market.

== See also ==
- Pharmaceutical industry in India
- Torrent Pharmaceuticals
- Zydus Lifesciences
- Cadila Pharmaceuticals
- Alembic Pharmaceuticals
