= Ipca Laboratories =

Indian multinational pharmaceutical company

Ipca Laboratories Limited
- Type: Public
- Traded as: BSE: 524494; NSE: IPCALAB
- Industry: Pharmaceutical
- Founded: 19 October 1949; 76 years ago as The Indian Pharmaceutical Combine Association Limited
- Founder: K.B. Mehla; Dr. N.S. Tibrawala
- Headquarters: Mumbai, Maharashtra, India
- Area served: Worldwide
- Key people: Premchand Godha (Executive chairman); Pranay Godha (MD & CEO); Ajit Kumar Jain (MD & CFO); Prashant Godha (Executive director)
- Products: Pharmaceutical drugs, generic drugs, active pharmaceutical ingredients, over-the-counter drugs
- Services: Contract development and manufacturing
- Revenue: ▲₹9,646 crore (US$1.0 billion) (FY2026)
- Net income: ▲₹1,141 crore (US$120 million) (FY2026)
- Number of employees: 18,667 (2026)
- Subsidiaries: Unichem Laboratories (52.67%); Onyx Scientific (UK); Pisgah Laboratories (US); Bayshore Pharmaceuticals (US); Trophic Wellness (52.4%)
- Website: www.ipca.com
- Footnotes; Financials as of 31 March 2026.

Ipca Laboratories Limited is an Indian multinational pharmaceutical company headquartered in Mumbai. The company manufactures and markets more than 350 finished-dosage formulations and around 80 active pharmaceutical ingredients (APIs), covering therapeutic areas that include pain management, rheumatology, antimalarials, cardiovascular medicine, dermatology and anti-diabetics, and has an emerging biosimilars business. Its products are sold in over 100 countries, and it is one of India's larger API exporters, supplying more than 70 countries.

Ipca is one of the largest global suppliers of the antimalarials hydroxychloroquine and chloroquine, as well as of APIs such as atenolol, chlorthalidone, losartan and metoprolol. Since 2023, it has held a majority stake in Unichem Laboratories. The company is listed on the BSE and the National Stock Exchange of India, and reported consolidated revenue of ₹9,646 crore (US$1.0 billion) in the financial year ended 31 March 2026.

== History ==
=== Formation and early years ===
The company was incorporated in Mumbai on 19 October 1949 as The Indian Pharmaceutical Combine Association Limited by a group of businessmen and medical professionals, and adopted its present name, Ipca Laboratories, in 1964. It commissioned a pharmaceutical manufacturing facility in Mumbai in 1969 and began marketing formulations in the domestic market in 1976.

=== Godha and Bachchan ownership ===
In 1975, control of the then loss-making company was acquired by a group that included chartered accountant Premchand Godha, film actor Amitabh Bachchan, Ajitabh Bachchan, Jaya Bachchan and M. R. Chandurkar. Godha, who had handled the Bachchan family's finances, joined the board in October 1975 and became managing director in 1983, when the company's turnover was about ₹54 lakh. Ipca commissioned its first API plant at Ratlam, Madhya Pradesh, in 1984 and became a public limited company in 1993.

In 1997, the Bachchan family agreed to sell its 36% holding in Ipca to the company's four whole-time directors, and had exited the company by 1999. The Godha family has led the company since; as of 2026, Premchand Godha serves as executive chairman, with his sons Pranay Godha and Prashant Godha on the board alongside managing director and CFO Ajit Kumar Jain. In 2004, Forbes selected Ipca for the second consecutive year as one of the 200 'Best under a billion' companies in Asia.

=== Expansion and acquisitions ===
Ipca acquired Onyx Scientific, a contract development and manufacturing organisation based in Sunderland, United Kingdom, in 2011. In 2013, it agreed to buy a 50% stake in Avik Pharmaceutical, a Vapi-based maker of steroid and hormone APIs. In 2015, it launched an open offer to raise its holding in Krebs Biochemicals & Industries, an Andhra Pradesh-based API manufacturer that became an associate company. In January 2018, Ipca acquired Pisgah Laboratories, a North Carolina-based API contract manufacturer, for US$9.65 million through its US and UK subsidiaries. The company has also built up a stake in the listed drugmaker Lyka Labs, which reached 40.98% in April 2024 following the conversion of warrants.

Ipca's largest acquisition came in 2023, when it agreed to buy a 33.38% promoter stake in Unichem Laboratories, completing the purchase in August 2023 for ₹945 crore (US$98 million), and acquired a further 19.29% through a mandatory open offer for ₹597.5 crore (US$62 million), taking its holding to 52.67%. The Competition Commission of India approved the acquisition subject to voluntary modifications offered by the company. The transaction made Unichem's subsidiaries in the United States, United Kingdom, Ireland, South Africa, Brazil and China part of the Ipca group. In 2024, the group consolidated its United States generics business by transferring the operations of Bayshore Pharmaceuticals, Ipca's wholly owned US subsidiary, to Unichem Pharmaceuticals (USA).

=== United States regulatory issues ===
Following a 2014 inspection of its Ratlam API plant, the US Food and Drug Administration (FDA) raised concerns about data integrity in the company's laboratory records, and Ipca voluntarily suspended API shipments to the United States. The FDA placed the Ratlam plant under an import alert in January 2015, and extended import alerts to the company's formulation plants at Pithampur (SEZ Indore) and Piparia (Silvassa) in March 2015. In January 2016, the agency issued a warning letter covering all three plants, citing systematic manipulation and deletion of failed test results.

During the COVID-19 pandemic in March 2020, the FDA temporarily exempted Ipca's hydroxychloroquine and chloroquine products from the import alert to secure supplies of the drugs, which were then under investigation as potential COVID-19 treatments; the exemptions were withdrawn later that year. In April 2020, the Government of India placed orders for about 100 million hydroxychloroquine tablets with Ipca and Zydus Cadila, among the country's largest manufacturers of the drug.

The import alerts were lifted in 2023 after fresh FDA inspections; the Ratlam plant's June 2023 inspection was classified "voluntary action indicated" in October 2023. After an absence of roughly nine years, the company resumed selling its formulations in the United States, which are distributed through its step-down subsidiary Unichem Pharmaceuticals (USA).

== Operations ==
=== Formulations ===
Ipca manufactures over 350 formulations across dosage forms including tablets, capsules, oral liquids, dry powders and injectables. In India, the company sells branded generics through a field force of more than 6,000 sales and marketing staff, reaching some 200,000 physicians, and its therapeutic strengths include pain management, rheumatology, antimalarials and cardiovascular treatments. Pain management has historically contributed over half of the company's domestic revenue, led by the aceclofenac brand Zerodol, which had annual sales of around ₹500 crore (US$52 million) by 2020. Several of the company's brands rank among the 300 largest pharmaceutical brands in India.

=== Active pharmaceutical ingredients ===
The company produces around 80 APIs, which account for roughly a quarter of its turnover and are exported to more than 70 countries. Ipca describes itself as one of the world's largest suppliers of several APIs, including the antihypertensives atenolol, losartan, metoprolol and propranolol, the diuretics chlorthalidone and furosemide, chloroquine phosphate and hydroxychloroquine sulphate. The API business is backward-integrated with the company's formulations manufacturing.

=== Biologics and biosimilars ===
Ipca entered the biosimilar field in 2014 through an alliance with the US biotechnology firm Oncobiologics (later Outlook Therapeutics) to develop and commercialise monoclonal antibody biosimilars for oncology and immunology, initially for the Indian and regional markets. The company subsequently developed biologics manufacturing at Pithampur, Madhya Pradesh, supported by biosimilar research and development in Mumbai. In September 2025, Ipca signed a technology-transfer agreement with the US-based BioSimilar Sciences to develop and commercially manufacture next-generation cancer and anti-inflammatory monoclonal antibody biosimilars at a facility in Aguadilla, Puerto Rico. In June 2026, it signed a global licensing agreement with Bhami's Research Laboratory for a high-concentration subcutaneous biologics delivery platform for use with monoclonal antibodies in oncology and inflammatory diseases.

=== Manufacturing and research ===
Ipca operates 16 manufacturing units in India, located across Madhya Pradesh, Gujarat, Maharashtra, Uttarakhand, Sikkim and Dadra and Nagar Haveli, along with overseas manufacturing at Onyx Scientific in the United Kingdom and Pisgah Laboratories in the United States. During 2025–26, the company closed older facilities at Tarapur, Maharashtra, and Ankleshwar, Gujarat, as part of a consolidation of its manufacturing footprint. Its research and development centres are located at Mumbai, Ratlam, Athal (Silvassa) and Ranu (Vadodara). The company's facilities and products hold approvals from regulators and agencies including the UK Medicines and Healthcare products Regulatory Agency, the European Directorate for the Quality of Medicines and the World Health Organization.

=== Subsidiaries and associates ===
Besides Unichem Laboratories, the group's subsidiaries include Onyx Scientific (UK), Pisgah Laboratories (US), Bayshore Pharmaceuticals (US), Trophic Wellness, and marketing and distribution companies in the United States, United Kingdom, Nigeria, Australia, New Zealand and Mexico. Avik Pharmaceutical is a 50:50 joint venture, while associates include Lyka Labs and Krebs Biochemicals & Industries.

== Finances ==
For the financial year ended 31 March 2026, Ipca reported consolidated revenue from operations of ₹9,646 crore (US$1.0 billion) and a net profit attributable to shareholders of ₹1,141 crore (US$120 million), with slightly more than half of revenue earned outside India. The company had 18,667 permanent employees as of 31 March 2026, and a market capitalisation of approximately ₹28,000 crore (US$2.9 billion) as of July 2026.

== Sustainability initiatives ==
Between 2019 and 2023, Ipca invested about ₹170 crore (US$18 million) in captive renewable energy projects totalling 36.57 MW – largely solar, along with a 2 MW wind project – across Maharashtra, Gujarat, Madhya Pradesh and Silvassa, which replace roughly 26% of the company's power consumption. The company has also begun replacing coal-fired boilers with biomass briquette and pellet fuel, including cultivation of napier grass as feedstock at Wardha, Maharashtra.

In February 2025, Ipca announced a 700-acre manufacturing campus at Wardha, described as Maharashtra's first fully "green" pharmaceutical plant, powered by a 15 MW solar plant and agricultural-waste pellet boilers with no coal usage; its first unit is intended to manufacture chloroquine formulations.

The company publishes an annual Business Responsibility and Sustainability Report under SEBI requirements. In 2024–25, it spent ₹20.03 crore (US$2.1 million) on corporate social responsibility programmes, implemented partly through the Ipca Foundation, in areas including education and skill development, healthcare, heritage conservation and environmental protection.
