= Samprada Singh =

Indian businessman (1925–2019)

- Born: 1925; Jehanabad, Bihar, India
- Died: 27 July 2019 (aged 94); Mumbai, India
- Education: Patna University (B.Com.)
- Occupations: Founder and chairman of Alkem Laboratories
- Children: NK Singh
- Website: alkemlabs.com

Samprada Singh (1925 – 27 July 2019) was an Indian businessman, who was the founder and chairman of Alkem Laboratories, which develops, manufactures and markets pharmaceutical formulations and nutraceuticals in India. It has operations in Europe, Africa, the Asia Pacific, South America, the United States and India.

In 2017, Samprada Singh had an estimated net worth of $3.3 billion. He died on 27 July 2019.

== Early life and business career ==
Samprada Singh was born in a Bhumihar family in Okri village, Jehanabad, Bihar. He graduated from Patna University with Bachelors in Commerce. In 1953 he started a small chemist shop in Patna near PMCH, Patna. Further expanding to medicine distribution business under the banner name of "Magadh Pharma". He founded Alkem Laboratories Ltd along with his younger brother Basudeo Narayan Singh, in 1973 and served as its chairman and his brother is the current executive chairman of Alkem.

Samprada Singh had three children, Naval Kishore Singh (Founder of Galfa LaboratoriesLimited), Satish Singh, Valmiki Singh and younger brother Basudev Narayan Singh (37th richest person in the country according to Forbes India with7.1Billion$Dollar which is approximately 70,000 Crore) had three children Dhananjay Singh who married to Madhurima Singh, Mrityunjay Singh who married Seema Singh(famous for grand wedding of her Daughter Meghna Singh)and a daughter Archana Singh(Also Promoter of ALKEM GROUP)who is married to Ajay Sharma (Founder & Chairman of Maxblis Group of Companies(Including 15 Different Company AIMS Group Biggest Commercial Proeject Spectrum Mall (Sector 75 was develop in more than 150 acre by this Group)15 acre NCR one of the bissggest mall )valued approx 50,000-100000 crore Country's Top consumer product, Construction, Developers, Housing Company )Alkem and Maxblis family Jointly market value is above 2 lakh crore Including all member and Company.

Ajay Sharma's elder brother is Dr Jitendra Kumar who is married to Dr Kavita Singh (Bhagini of Samparda Singh adopted as daughter) and his younger brother is Sunil Kumar Kaushik is a Politician representing Patliputra Loksabha and co-founder of Ramaiya Resources Private Limited Group (Developer & Builder, Construction and agro-Business)

Today Alkem Group acquire more than 20 companies.And Group is working more than 50 countries with Approx 5 percent of Indian pharmaceutical market capture and 3 rd largest pharmaceutical company of India .Alkem Family is also in several businesses like diamond, jewellery, food and many other business. Both brother Samprada Singh and Basudeo Narayan Singh Ranked top 31 Richest man of India in 2020-21 according to Forbes and both Ranked Richest Richest Bihari also .

== Honors and awards ==
- In 2009, Pharmaceutical Leadership Summit & Awards founded by Satya Brahma awarded Samprada Singh with a Lifetime Achievement Award for building Alkem as a top Indian Pharma Company.
- In 2017, Samprada Singh received the Ernst and Young 'Entrepreneur of the Year in Healthcare and Life Sciences'.
- In 2017, Samprada Singh was ranked as the 43rd richest man in India by Forbes India rich list.

2020-2021 Samprada Singh and his Cousin Brother Singh family Ranked 31 Richest family of India

- In 2018, Samprada Singh was the richest Bihari in India.
