= Galenic =

Galenic may refer to:

- Galen (129 CE – c. 200/c. 216 CE), ancient Greek physician
- Galenic formulation, the principles of preparing and compounding medicines in order to optimize their absorption, named after Galen
