= Dishman Carbogen Amcis =

Indian pharmaceutical company

Dishman Carbogen Amcis Limited
- Company type: Public
- Traded as: NSE: DCAL; BSE: 540701
- Industry: Pharmaceuticals
- Founded: 1983
- Headquarters: Ahmedabad, Gujarat, India
- Key people: Janmejay R. Vyas (Chairman); Arpit J. Vyas (Global Managing Director); Harshil R. Dalal (Global Chief Financial Officer); Himani Dhotre (Resigned)
- Products: Contract Research & Development, Contract Manufacturing New Molecules, HiPo Cat IV+, Contrast Media, Fine Chemicals, Vitamin D & Analogues, Formulation Development Fill & Finish, Softgels & HiPo Cat IV+ Parenteral.
- Revenue: ▲₹2,440 crore (US$250 million) (FY23)
- Net income: ▼₹−29 crore (US$−3.0 million) (FY23)
- Website: www.imdcal.com

Dishman Carbogen Amcis Ltd is an Indian multinational pharmaceutical company specialized in the manufacture of active ingredients and contract development and manufacturing. Dishman employs over 1,000 people worldwide and is listed on the Bombay Stock Exchange (BSE) and National Stock Exchange of India (NSE).

== History ==
The Dishman Group was founded in 1983 by Janmejay R. Vyas, Managing Director of the Dishman Group. Since the beginning, the focus of the Dishman Group has been on research and development of various in-house technologies for the manufacture of quaternary ammonium compounds (quats) and active pharmaceutical ingredients. The first facility of the Dishman Group was built in 1987 in Naroda; in 1996 the company initiated its expansion at Bavla where it is currently headquartered. Through several acquisitions, the Dishman Group became a global company with multiple manufacturing facilities in India, Europe and China serving pharmaceutical and biopharmaceutical companies.

== Company structure ==
The Dishman Carbogen Amcis Group operates in two segments: contract research services and marketable molecules such as bulk drugs, intermediates, quaternary ammonium compounds (quats), specialty chemicals and phase transfer catalysts. Dishman operates in four business units:

- Dishman Specialty Chemicals, which manufactures phase transfer catalysts, intermediates, fine chemicals, and products for the pharmaceutical, cosmetic and related industries.
- Dishman Vitamins and Chemicals, which manufactures vitamin D2, vitamin D3, vitamin D analogs, cholesterol and lanolin related products for pharmaceutical, cosmetic and related markets.
- Dishman Disinfectants, which manufactures antiseptic and disinfectant formulations.
- Dishman Custom Services, which includes Dishman contract research services and the subsidiary Carbogen Amcis. This business unit focuses on process research and development, API supply to support clinical trials, commercial manufacture of APIs. including cytotoxic and cytostatic drugs.

== Locations ==
- Bavla and Naroda (Ahmedabad), India: Dishman Carbogen Amcis Ltd. The Naroda and Bavla sites are operational since 1989 and 1996, respectively. These sites manufacture phase transfer catalysts, pharmaceutical intermediates, active pharmaceutical ingredients and fine chemicals.
- Shanghai, China: Dishman Carbogen Amcis (Shanghai) Co., Ltd. The site manufactures intermediates and active pharmaceutical ingredients, including highly potent drugs.
- Veenendaal, The Netherlands: CARBOGEN AMCIS B.V manufactures of Vitamin D2, Vitamin D3, Vitamin D analogues, cholesterol and lanolin related products. The site was acquired from Solvay in 2007.
- Bubendorf, Switzerland: CARBOGEN AMCIS AG. Founded in 1987 and acquired by Dishman in 2006. The site supports the development and manufacture of active pharmaceutical ingredients, highly potents drugs and complex intermediate for clinical trials and commercial purposes.
- Aarau and Hunzenschwil Switzerland: CARBOGEN AMCIS AG. These sites operate since 1994 and 2000 and were acquired by Dishman in 2006. The Aarau and Hunzenschwill sites support the development and manufacture of active pharmaceutical ingredients and complex intermediate for clinical trials and commercial purposes.
- Vionnaz Switzerland: The facility was acquired by CARBOGEN AMCIS in 2014 and is designed to develop and manufac-ture highly potent APIs including the capability to produce highly potent warheads and linkers for antibody drug conjugates (ADCs).
- Riom, France: CARBOGEN AMCIS SAS. Founded in 1998 and acquired by Dishman in 2012. The Riom site is focused on the development and production of sterile parenteral drugs for clinical trials.
- Manchester, UK: CARBOGEN AMCIS Ltd. Operating since 1983 and acquired by Dishman in 2005. The site focuses on non–GMP manufacture of complex intermediate for the pharmaceutical industry.
