= Dahej Port =

Port in India

Coordinates: 21°42′N 72°32′E

Dahej is a cargo port situated on the South-west coast of Gujarat, India in Bharuch district. There is 17.5 million tonnes per year capacity LNG terminal operated by Petronet in Dahej.

== Port Information ==
=== General ===
The Port of Dahej is located in the Gulf of Cambay, at the junction of Guljaria and Ban Creek. It is a natural deep water port accommodating vessels of draft up to 25m. It is about 45 kilometers from Bharuch, which is now being connected to the Port of Dahej by a broad-gauge rail siding with an initial capacity of 25-30 rakes a day. The nearest airports are at Ahmedabad, Surat and Baroda.

A deep draft multi cargo berthing facility is being proposed with a 3.5 km waterfront, to develop the port according to the directions of the Gujarat Maritime Board. In addition to this there are four other port facilities at Dahej, owned by Petronet LNG Limited (including a bulk terminal sub-concessioned to Adani), GCPTCL, ONGC OPAL, Birla Copper, Torrent Pharmaceuticals and Reliance Industries.

=== Chart ===
- Indian Naval Hydrograph - 2082
- Dahej Harbour & Admiralty Chart :- 51

=== Communication ===
- VHF Channel 16, 11, 12, 14 for working & marine band
- Call sign: DHIL JETTY OR CONTROLL
- FREE PRATIQUE: normally issued by customs boarding officer
- BSNL is providing the landline and broadband services in the area, recently WiMAX service has also been launched in the PCPIR region.

=== Meteorological data ===
- Highest Astronomical Tide (HAT): 10.800 m
- Highest High-Water Spring (HHWS): +10.200 m
- Mean High Water Spring (MHWS): 8.800 m
- Mean High Water Neap (MHWN): 7.10 m
- Mean Sea Level (MSL):- +5.100 m
- Mean Low Water Spring (MLWS): +0.900 m
- Mean Low Water Neap (MLWN): +1.800 m
- Lowest Low Water Spring (LLWS): +0.700 m
- Lowest Astronomical Tide (LAT): -1.000 m

=== Anchorage ===
Vessels calling at the port can anchor at a distance of 5.5 km from the Gujarat Maritime Board Old Port and about 6.5 km from Jageshwar IPCL Jetty. The draft available is up to 25m. During high tide, the water levels rise by up to 10 - 11m.

=== Pilotage ===
Pilots are not required; however, the services of a local guide are provided on request.

=== Restrictions ===
As the port is a direct berthing port, there is a restriction with respect to LOA, beam or draft based on the size of berth. While capacity is being augmented, the current berthing restrictions for LOA/beam/draft are 270m/38m/17m respectively.

=== Port estate ===
Dahej Port has captive jetties and a private port used by DHIL, Petronet LNG, GCPTCL, IPCL.

=== Cargo handling ===
The Petronet LNG jetty is a dedicated deep-water facility for import of LNG. One berth is already operating, and another is under construction. Another bulk handling facility is available to the north of this facility for unloading various bulk cargoes at the rate of 30,000 tons per day. Two such berths are available for berthing. A dedicated liquid handling facility owned by GCPTCL (Gujarat Chemical Port Terminal Company Limited), which handles liquid cargoes with unloading / loading rates up to 25000 tonnes per day. A captive facility for handling Copper Ore and Sulphuric Acid is being owned and operated by Birla Copper for handling its own cargoes. The immediate hinterland is currently undergoing phase development with the Dahej, a Special Economic Zone being developed over an area of 30,000 hectares. While the current four-lane connecting highway is being expanded to a six-lane highway, the rail corridor is also being developed to a broad-gauge line with individual sidings being offered to the major prospect users in the area.

=== Commodities ===
Import: Coal, Chemicals, LNG, Rock Phosphate, Urea(proposed), Container(proposed)
Export: POL, Chemicals
Other facilities: crew change, store supplies, repairs, fresh water, bunkers
