= Chirayu Amin =

Indian cricket administrator and businessman

- Education: Maharaja Sayajirao University of Baroda (B.A.); Seton Hall University (MBA)
- Occupations: Chairman & managing director of Alembic Pharmaceuticals Ltd and president of the Baroda Cricket Association.
- Spouse: Malika Amin
- Children: 3

Chirayu Amin is an Indian billionaire businessman and cricket administrator. He is the chairman and managing director of Alembic Pharmaceuticals Ltd., and Alembic Group. He was the chairman of the Indian Premier League and vice president of the Board of Control for Cricket in India. He was also the chairman of the Federation of Indian Chambers of Commerce. He also was the president of the Baroda Cricket Association. As of May 2021, Amin has a net worth of US$1.8 billion according to Forbes.

In January 2021, he was awarded a lifetime achievement award by the Federation of Gujarat Industries (FGI).

== Personal life ==
Chirayu Amin was born into Leva Patel family in Vadodara, Gujarat, which was involved in industries like textiles and pharmaceuticals, Chirayu Amin was raised with a foundation of business acumen. His father, Ramanbhai Amin, was a key figure in the pharmaceutical industry, having founded Alembic Pharmaceuticals in 1907, one of India's oldest pharmaceutical companies. His wife, Malika Chirayu Amin, was named among the India's richest woman in 2020 by Kotak Wealth Hurun.
