= Elder Pharmaceuticals =

Indian pharmaceutical company

- Company type: Public
- Industry: Pharmaceuticals, Drugs & healthcare
- Founded: 1989; 37 years ago
- Founder: Jagdish Saxena
- Defunct: 2022
- Fate: Bankrupted
- Headquarters: Mumbai, Maharashtra, India
- Products: Medicines and Vaccines
- Revenue: ₹ 16,743 million (2013)
- Operating income: ₹ 823 million (2013)
- Net income: ₹ 937 million (2013)
- Total assets: ₹ 24,924 million (2013)
- Total equity: ₹ 7,691 million (2013)
- Number of employees: 4300
- Subsidiaries: NeutraHealth, Elvista
- Website: https://elderpharma.com/

Elder Pharmaceuticals Ltd was a pharmaceutical company headquartered in Mumbai, Maharashtra. Its main activities included the manufacturing and marketing of prescription pharmaceutical brands, surgical and medical devices. It had 6 manufacturing plants in India & 1 in Nepal. It manufactured various dosage forms like tablets, capsules, syrups, injectables, topical creams and ointments.

== History ==
In 1989, Jagdish Saxena formed Elder Pharmaceuticals in Mumbai when he lost his job due to the shut down of the pharma division of a company for which he was working. The first manufacturing plant was set up in 1989 at Nerul. It was listed on Bombay Stock Exchange and National Stock Exchange in 2000.

In 2010, the company acquired the UK-based supplements company NeutraHealth for £12.2 million.

On 13 December 2013, Torrent Pharmaceuticals signed a definitive deal to acquire Elder Pharmaceuticals' branded domestic formulations business in India and Nepal for ₹2,000 crore. Even after the sale, Elder Pharmaceuticals faced a debt crisis. In 2016, the company was delisted from the stock exchanges on account of non-compliances.

In October 2013, founder Jagdish Saxena died. In October 2017, the MD Alok Saxena died at the age of 52. The promoter group was later led by Jagdish Saxena's second son Anuj Saxena, a former TV actor, and daughter Shalini Saxena Kumar, an entrepreneur.

In 2017, the company went into liquidation.

In 2025, a Mumbai court fined the company Rs 18,300,000 for failure to honour a cheque.
