= Formulation =

Putting together of components

Formulation is a term used in various senses in various applications, both the material and the abstract or formal. Its fundamental meaning is the putting together of components in appropriate relationships or structures, according to a formula. Etymologically formula is the diminutive of the Latin forma, meaning shape. In that sense a formulation is created according to the standard for the product.

== Abstract applications ==
Disciplines in which one might use the word formulation in the abstract sense include logic, mathematics, linguistics, legal theory, and computer science. For details, see the related articles.

== Material applications ==
In more material senses the concept of formulation appears in the physical sciences, such as physics, chemistry, and biology. It also is ubiquitous in industry, engineering and medicine, especially pharmaceutics.

== Pharmacy ==
In pharmacy, a formulation is a mixture or a structure such as a capsule, tablet, or an emulsion, prepared according to a specific procedure (called a "formula"). Formulations are a very important aspect of creating medicines, since they are essential to ensuring that the active part of the drug is delivered to the correct part of the body, in the right concentration, and at the right rate (not too fast and not too slowly). A good example is a drug delivery system that exploits supersaturation. They also need to have an acceptable taste (in the case of pills, tablets or syrups), last long enough in storage still to be safe and effective when used, and be sufficiently stable both physically and chemically to be transported from where they are manufactured to the eventual consumer. Competently designed formulations for particular applications are safer, more effective, and more economical than any of their components used singly.

== Other examples of product formulations ==
Formulations are commercially produced for drugs, cosmetics, coatings, dyes, alloys, cleaning agents, foods, lubricants, fuels, fertilisers, pesticides and many others.

== Components ==
Components (also called ingredients), when mixed according to a formula, create a formulation.

Some components impart specific properties to the formulation when it is put into use. For example, certain components (polymers) are used in paint formulations to achieve deforming or levelling properties. Some components of a formulation may only be active in particular applications.

A formulation may be created for any of the following purposes:

- to achieve effects that cannot be obtained from its components when these are used singly
- to achieve a higher degree of effectiveness
- to improve handling properties and often safety for the user

== See also ==
- Ingredient
- Pesticide formulation
- Galenic formulation
