= Tribhuvandas Kalyandas Gajjar =

Indian chemist, educator and industrialist

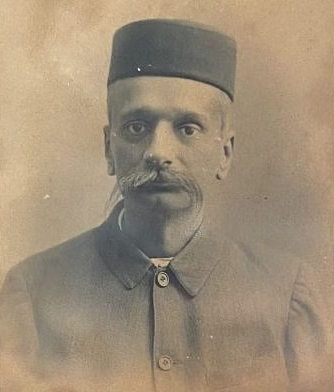
- Born: 3 August 1863; Surat, Bombay Presidency, British India
- Died: 16 July 1920 (aged 56); Bombay, British India
- Education: Elphinstone College, Bombay
- Scientific career
- Fields: Chemistry
- Workplaces: Kala Bhavan; Wilson College

Tribhuvandas Kalyandas Gajjar, also known as T. K. Gajjar, (1863–1920) was an industrial chemist, educator and industrialist from India. He was a pioneer and proponent of modern industrial chemical industry in western region of British India. He introduced German synthetic dyes to the Indian textile industry, initiated large-scale alcohol production, and advanced technical education. He taught at Kala Bhavan in Baroda (now Vadodara in Gujarat) and later at Wilson College, Bombay (now Mumbai). He was a founder of chemistry laboratories and co-founder of Alembic Chemical Works.

== Early life and education ==
Tribhuvandas Gajjar was born on 3 August 1863 in Surat (now in Gujarat) into the Vaishya Suthar caste, traditionally associated with carpentry. His father, Kalyandas, (1829–1915) was a prominent civil engineer and businessman, owning timber shops in Surat and Ahmedabad. His father had written books on traditional architecture. Fulkorben was his mother. Gajjar displayed early mechanical aptitude, experimenting with broken laboratory equipment and mastering carpentry skills in his father's workshop. he had interest in several subjects including science and maths.

After excelling in his matriculation in 1879, Gajjar joined Elphinstone College, Bombay, earning a B.Sc. in chemistry in 1882, standing first in his class. In 1884, he completed an MA in chemistry. He had briefly studied medicine at Grant Medical College as well as law with his friend. He lived in Karachi for some time.

== Career ==
Gajjar wanted to start a polytechnic in Surat with help of Tapidas Sheth who had agreed to fund but the project failed due to death of Tapidas.

He joined Baroda College as professor of chemistry in 1886. He started a printing and dyeing laboratory in Baroda. He published a Gujarati quarterly Rang Rahasya about dyeing. Recognizing the need for practical education in science, he proposed a polytechnic institute, leading to the establishment of Kala Bhavan in 1890 under the support of Maharaja Sayajirao Gaekwad III. As principal, Gajjar introduced courses in civil and mechanical engineering, textile chemistry, and dyeing. He emphasised the education in native languages and founded the Vernacular Academy to promote the cause. Collaborating with Yashwant B. Athlye, he planned a scientific and educational books in Gujarati and Marathi, supported by a grant of Rs. 50,000 from Maharaja Sayajirao Gaekwad III. This effort resulted in the publication of two-book series: Sayaji Gnanmanjusha and Sayaji Laghu Gnanmanjusha; overseen by Gajjar. He also conceived a multilingual thesaurus but was never completed. When his idea to convert Kala Bhavan in an industrial university did not succeed and due to frustration with bureaucracy, he resigned from Kala Bhavan, and moved to Bombay in 1896.

He played a critical role in revolutionizing the Indian textile industry. At a time when traditional vegetable dyes were losing global markets to coal-tar-based synthetic dyes, Gajjar partnered with German manufacturers to establish training programs in India. He collaborated with industrialist J. N. Tata to integrate dyeing technology into Indian mills, setting up laboratories and training schools in Surat, Delhi, Ahmedabad, Kanpur, Amritsar and other cities. His efforts helped Indian mills adopt advanced dyeing techniques, saving the industry from stagnation and providing employment to thousands of workers.

After moving to Bombay, he joined Wilson College as a professor of chemistry and also started a laboratory. He revised the curricula of the University of Bombay to include industrial applications of chemistry. His private initiative, the Techno-Chemical Laboratory in Girgaum, founded in 1900, trained students in starting their own factories, leading to the establishment of several industries. His laboratory allowed to award MA in chemistry in 1907 by the University of Bombay.

The statue of queen Victoria which Gajjar helped to clean

He developed techniques to clean pearls and to refine chemicals in his laboratory. The pearl cleaning technique brought him wealth but also legal issues. He also developed and patented a medicine during the Spanish flu. He had also devised Iodine Terchloride treatment of plague. When nationalist Damodar Chapekar tarred Queen Victoria’s marble statue in Bombay in October 1896, he help it clean it when all other attempts failed. He was awarded ₹2000 as a prize in 1897 for help. His ₹5000 fees for the service were paid by Adamjee Peerbhoy, Sheriff of Bombay, when the government and the municipality could not.

His student Anant Shridhar Kotibhaskar founded a laboratory in Parel, Bombay and was funded by Gajjar in sum of ₹50,000. In 1903, he started a small factory called Parel Laboratories in Bombay. Later another spirit factory was started in Baroda in 1905 and a lac factory in Nadiad which was operational till 1907. In 1907, he co-founded Alembic Chemical Works in Baroda with Kotibhaskar and his another student Bhailal Dajibhai Amin joined them later. The company initially focused on the production of rectified spirit, pharmaceutical products, and chemical reagents. The company's distillation facilities were further expanded during World War I, supplying alcohol and essential chemicals.

He died on 16 July 1920 in Bombay.

== Personal life ==
Gajjar had a son. He was a friend with several writers and poets such as Govardhanram Tripathi, Kant and Balwantray Thakore. Govardhanram Tripathi had died in his bunglow at Bombay.

== Publication ==
- Gajjar, T. K. (1 April 1902). "The Iodine Terchloride Treatment of Plague". The Indian Medical Gazette. 37 (4): 134. PMC 5156203. PMID 29003668.

== See also ==
- Prafulla Chandra Ray
