= Kala Bhavan, Vadodara =

Kala Bhavan
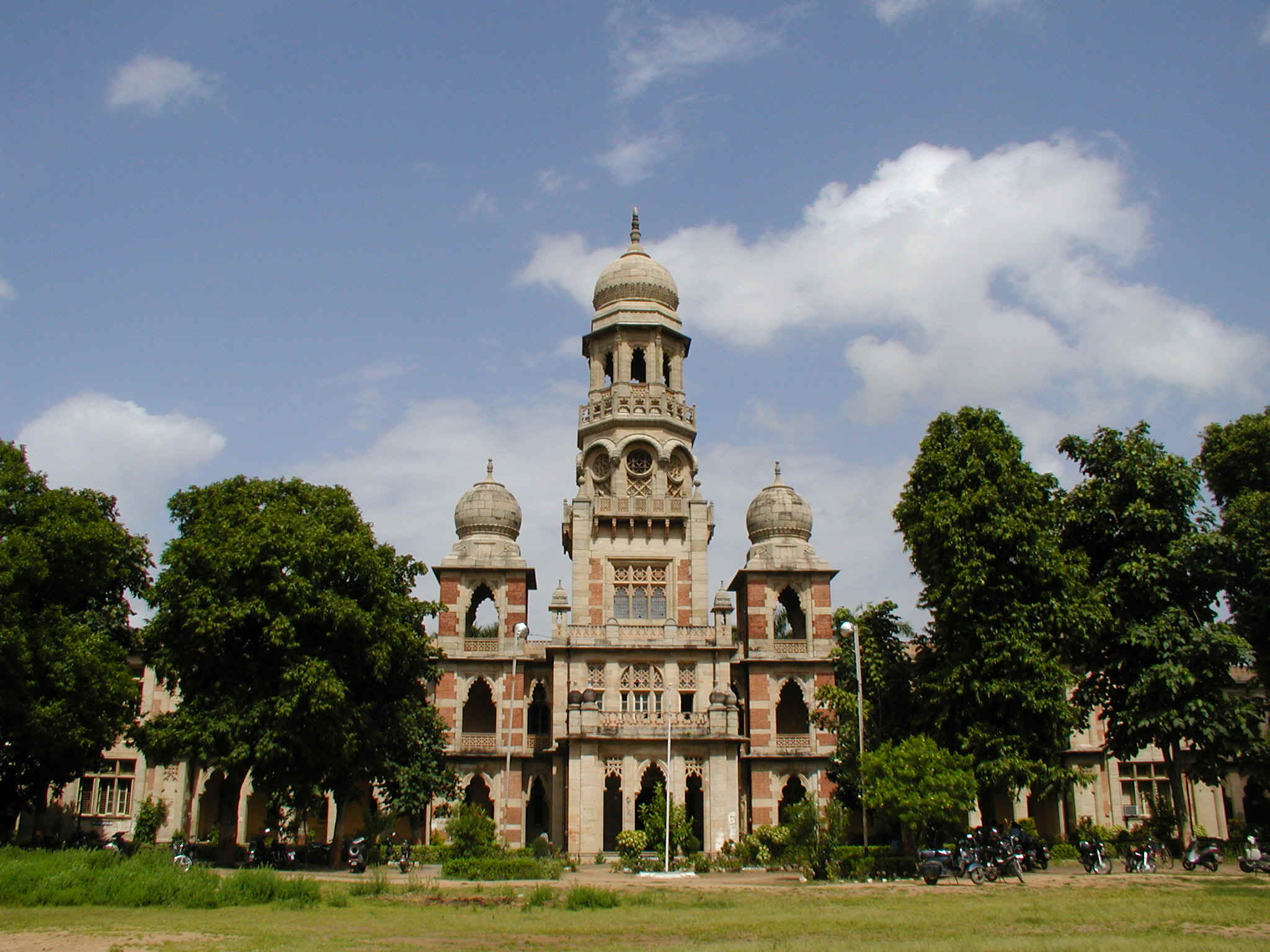
- Building of Kala Bhavan
- Interactive map of the Kala Bhavan area

General information
- Architectural style: Indo-Saracenic architecture
- Location: Vadodara, Gujarat, India
- Coordinates: 22.29787906°N 73.1969069°E
- Completed: 1890
- Client: Baroda State

Design and construction
- Architect: A. H. Coyle

Kala Bhavan (lit. 'House of Arts') or Senapati Bhavan also known as Faculty of Technology and Engineering is a historical building and a technical institute in Vadodara, Gujarat, India. It was established by Sayajirao Gaekwad III in June 1890.

== History ==
The idea of establishing Kala Bhavan was first mooted in 1886 by Tribhuvandas Kalyandas Gajjar, a professor of chemistry, during a prize distribution ceremony held at Baroda College. On 25 March 1890 Sayajirao Gaekwad III, the Maharaja of Baroda State, issued the executive order to start Kala Bhavan. It was operated from Senapati Bhavan in its early days until the building was ready for use. The construction of the building was completed in 1890. Initially, the building was used as the temporary residence of the royal family during the construction work of the Lakshmi Vilas Palace. Later, the building became known as Sainik Bhavan.

== Architecture ==
The building was built in neo-classical or Indo-Saracenic architecture style with gothic fillings. The shape of the building resembles the English letter E. Central wing along with linear wing are double storeyed while the corner wings are single storeyed. Semi-circular arches, Pedimental windows with murals and pilasters are the classical elements of the buildings.
