= Efavirenz/lamivudine/tenofovir =

Medication for the treatment of HIV/AIDS

Combination of
- Efavirenz: Non-nucleoside reverse transcriptase inhibitor
- Lamivudine: Nucleoside reverse transcriptase inhibitor
- Tenofovir disoproxil: Nucleoside reverse transcriptase inhibitor

Clinical data
- Trade names: Symfi, Symfi Lo
- Other names: EFV/3TC/TDF
- AHFS/Drugs.com: Professional Drug Facts
- MedlinePlus: a618028
- License data: US DailyMed: Efavirenz_Lamivudine_Tenofovir disoproxil
- Pregnancy category: Contraindicated
- Routes of administration: By mouth
- ATC code: J05AR11 (WHO)

Legal status
- Legal status: US: ℞-only; In general: ℞ (Prescription only)

Identifiers
- KEGG: D11392

Efavirenz/lamivudine/tenofovir (EFV/3TC/TDF), sold under the brand name Symfi among others, is a fixed-dose combination antiretroviral medication for the treatment of HIV/AIDS. It combines efavirenz, lamivudine, and tenofovir disoproxil. As of 2019, it is listed by the World Health Organization as an alternative first line option to dolutegravir/lamivudine/tenofovir. It is taken by mouth.

Side effects can include joint pain, sleepiness, headaches, depression, trouble sleeping, and itchiness. Severe side effects may include depression, psychosis, or osteonecrosis. In those with a history of epilepsy, it may increase the frequency of seizures. Greater care should also be taken in those with kidney problems. Its use during pregnancy appears to be unsafe.

It is on the World Health Organization's List of Essential Medicines. The combination received tentative approval in the United States in 2014, and was granted approval in February 2018. Its availability and importance is supported by Medecins Sans Frontieres. It is available as a generic medication.
