= Sabarmati Thermal Power Station =

Power plant in Ahmedabad, India

Sabarmati Thermal Power Station or Torrent Sabarmati Thermal Power Station is a coal-fired power plant. It is located in Ahmedabad, Gujarat. The power plant is owned by Torrent Power.

== Capacity ==
The first power plant at this site became operational in 1934 with installed capacity of 37.5 MW (2×3.75 MW and 4×7.5 MW). In the place of original power plant, new power plant came up with installed capacity of 422 MW (1×60 MW, 1×120 MW and 2×121 MW).

Unit Number	Installed Capacity (MW)	Date of Commissioning	Status
C	60	1997	Decommissioned
D	120	1978	Running
E	121	1984	Running
F	121	1988	Running
