= Alembic Group =

Indian conglomerate

- Traded as: BSE: 506235; NSE: ALEMBICLTD
- Industry: Conglomerate
- Founded: 1907; 119 years ago
- Founder: Prof. T. K. Gajjar; Prof. A. S. Kotibhasker; B. D. Amin
- Headquarters: Vadodara, Gujarat, India
- Area served: Worldwide
- Key people: Chirayu Amin (Chairman); Malika C. Amin (MD); Udit Amin (Director)
- Products: Pharmaceuticals; Real estate; Glassware; Engineering Services; Chemicals
- Revenue: ▲₹ 1524.06 million (2015-2016)
- Net income: ▲₹ 246.7 million (2015-2016)
- Number of employees: 319,000
- Subsidiaries: Alembic Pharmaceuticals; Alembic Real Estate; Shreno Ltd(Alembic Glassware); Uday Education Trust
- Website: www.alembiclimited.com

Alembic Group is an Indian conglomerate headquartered in Vadodara. It was founded in 1907 and was initially known as Alembic Chemical Works Company Ltd. The company was founded by T. K. Gajjar, A. S. Kotibhaskar and B. D. Amin. It is one of the oldest industrial houses in India and has a diversified portfolio of business. Their major businesses include, pharmaceuticals, healthcare, engineering, chemicals and glassware production. In 2014–2015, the market cap of Alembic Group was ₹9,578 crore while its turnover was ₹2,200 crore.

== History ==
Alembic Group initially began with primary focus on production of tinctures, alcohol, vitamins, penicillin, and eventually active pharmaceutical ingredients (API) thus majorly having a brief focus on the pharmaceutical business. However, in 2010, the group demerged its pharmaceutical business, thereby making it to be separate entity called Alembic Pharmaceuticals Ltd.

== Subsidiaries ==
This section lists the various businesses under Alembic Group.

=== Pharmaceutical ===
The Alembic Pharmaceuticals Ltd. is a public listed company belonging to the Alembic Group. It is involved in manufacture of pharmaceutical substances, pharmaceutical products and intermediates.

=== Real estate ===
Alchemy Real Estate is the real estate arm of Alembic Group and is involved in developing residential townships, industrial plants, schools, commercial offices and hospitals majorly in the state of Gujarat. In November 2014, Alchemy Real Estate launched its first project in the city of Bengaluru – Karnataka.

=== Glassware ===
Shreno Ltd. formerly known as Alembic Glass Industries Ltd. is a business of Alembic Group dedicated to glassware manufacturing. Shreno Ltd. is involved in manufacture of table glassware under its brand name Yera Glassware.

=== Philanthropy ===
==== Schools ====
The Alembic Group through its Uday Education Trust has established Alembic Group of Schools. The group has five schools which aid in providing affordable and high quality education to children based in Vadodara and Bangaluru. The Schools established are enlisted below.

- D. R. Amin Memorial School, Vadodara
- Utkarsh Vidyalaya, Vadodara
- Tejas Vidyalaya, Vadodara
- Alembic Vidyalaya, Vadodara

==== Hospitals ====
Alembic Group has established Bhailal Amin General Hospital (BAGH), a tertiary care multi-specialty hospital in Vadodara. BAGH is the only hospital approved by the state and the central government of India to conduct cardiac treatment, surgery, kidney transplants/surgery and cadaver transplants.
