= Oil agglomeration =

Oil agglomeration is one of the special processes of mineral processing. It is based on differences in surface properties of desired and undesired minerals i.e., carbonaceous coal particles and gangue minerals. It is used for dressing, dehydration of finely dispersed naturally hydrophobic minerals – most often coal, in the first tests – for sulphide ores, in addition, adhesion minerals processing of gold and diamonds. The product of oil agglomeration of coal is carbonaceous agglomerate or granulate.

There are many factors which affect the oil agglomeration process such as coal ranks, moisture content, pulp density or solid concentration, oil dosage or oil concentration, particle size distribution, oil types, agglomeration time, conditioning time, concentration of salts, pH, vessel type, impeller design, number of baffles placed etc., which can be categorized into process variables and design variables.

== Literature ==
- Application of coal agglomeration for clean-up of hydrocarbon contaminated soil/ Ignasiak I., Carson D., Pawlak W // Int. Conf. Sci., Tocyo., Jct. 23-27, 1989: Proc. Vol. 2. - San Jose Calif 1989. - p. 1019-1022.
- Ding Y., Erten M. Selective flocculation versus oil agglomeration in removing sulfur from ultra fine coal// Proc. and Util. Hing Sulfur Coals III: 3rd Int. Conf. Ames. Iowa, Nov. 14-16, 1989.- Amsterdam . - 1990.- р. 255-264.
- Shrauti S.M., Arnold D. W. Recovery of waste fine coal by oil agglomeration // Fuel, 1995, 74, № 3, р. 454-465.
- Tovas D. Wheelock ea. The role of air in oil agglomeration of coal at a moderate shear rate// Fuel, 1994, v. 73, № 7. р. 1103-1107.
- Vega V.G. ea. Selective agglomeration of hing rank coals with vegetable oils // 8 th Int. Conf. on coal Science. Oviedo. Spain, 10–12 September 1995. p. 296-297.
- Some factors affecting spherical oil agglomeration performance of coal fines // International Journal of Mineral Processing. Volume 65, Issues 3–4, July 2002, Pages 177–190
- Білецький В. С., Сергеев П. В., Папушин Ю. Л. — Теорія і практика селективної масляної агрегації вугілля — Донецьк: Грань. — 1996. — 264 с.
- Сергєєв П. В., Білецький В. С. Селективна флокуляція вугільних шламів органічними реагентами. (монографія). — Донецьк: Східний видавничий дім, Донецьке відділення НТШ, «Редакція гірничої енциклопедії», 2010. — 240 с.
- Елишевич А. Т. Некоторые особенности процесса структурирования углемасляных конгломератов, полученных при обезвоживании гидросмеси МГТС// ХТТ. — 1983. — № 2, с. 115–119.
- Масляная грануляция как эффективный метод подготовки угля к гидротранспорту / А. Т. Елишевич, Н. Д. Оглоблин, В. С. Белецкий; Донец. политехн. ин-т. – Донецк, 1982. – 9 с. – Деп. в ЦНИЭИуголь 1982, № 2515.
- Масляна агломерація : (обзор) / В. С. Белецкий, П. В. Сергеев, В. Н. Самылин [и др.]; Донец. политехн. ин-т – Донецк, 1988. – 37 с. – Деп. в УкрНИИНТИ 19.10.88, № 2658.
