= Functional sourcing =

Contracted agreement to conduct individual job roles

Functional sourcing is the contracted agreement to conduct specific individual job roles by an organization for another organization. The notion of functional sourcing has existed in several industries for years but was first introduced into the clinical research industry by clinical research organizations (CROs).

== Concept ==
The concept of functional sourcing is to utilize a vendor to provide resources to perform the actual clinical research functions required as opposed to outsourcing the entire study. Under this model, the functions are performed by a CRO on sponsor systems by following sponsor processes. The sponsor retains control of the systems, data, standard operating procedures (SOPs), and project related oversight to the extent they desire and agree. The CRO provides the human resources, incurs the costs related to the team's employment, and is responsible for line management of the team.

This model benefits both the sponsor and the CRO. Because all the work is conducted by CRO resources on sponsors' systems following sponsors' SOPs, the sponsor benefits by maintaining control of service delivery without the burden of resource management and utilization. There is no risk of a sponsor not having access to the data. By utilizing sponsor systems, the sponsor controls access to the data.

The CRO benefits because the CRO has the opportunity to become a strategic partner with the sponsor and can, in turn, participate in the planning and forecasting process for sponsor resource needs. This is attractive to CROs because it is often difficult for CROs to otherwise manage fluctuating resource needs as various projects arise. Being involved at a higher level to understand sponsor needs helps the CRO manage resources. By the same token, this forecasting and planning methodology is something that the sponsor wants to outsource to the CRO.

== Sub-models ==
For all intents and purposes, functional sourcing is really made up of a subset of outsourcing models:

- Insourcing and employee transfer and re-engagement
- Outsourcing
- Low-cost centers
- Hybrid solutions

=== Insourcing, remote insourcing, employee transfer and re-engagement ===
Under the insourcing model, employees are on-boarded by the CRO, placed at sponsor or remote locations, and directed by the sponsor at their sites. Insourced resources are valuable in meeting research goals during periods of peak demand. This model allows sponsors to extend their current team without increasing their headcount. The task of the CRO is to then resource employees to the sponsor who can blend in with the culture of the sponsor company and provide the services that the sponsor needs in conjunction with the existing team. This prevents the sponsors from needing to bring on a dedicated staff when they do not have the long term need. Remote insourcing is similar to insourcing, except employees are placed at a remote location.

Under the employee transfer and re-engagement model, the sponsor transfers some of their existing employees to the CRO. The CRO in turn hires the resources as company employees and then dedicates them back to the sponsor. This allows the sponsor to offload the management of the employees and reduces their headcount but at the same time allows them to have the same individuals performing their services thus maintaining continuity across the project. The sponsor does not have to manage the resources over time but is still able to have the work completed by people they know and trust.

=== Outsourcing ===
Outsourcing is where a sponsor turns over a task or service to a CRO. The service is performed on the sponsor's systems from a remote CRO office. This is one of the most common Functional Sourcing models.

One reason that functional sourcing is becoming a more widely used outsourcing model is the strides that technology has made in the last two decades regarding remote access. Today there are several ways in which remote access can be achieved. One method is to put in a dedicated hard line that connects the CROs machines to the sponsor's systems. Another way is for the sponsor to provide the CRO with a secure VPN connection that is made by connecting the firewall of the CRO to the firewall of the sponsor. Another commonly used method is where the sponsor treats the CRO like a remote employee by providing them their VPN software or a company issued laptop.

The benefits of all these methods for the sponsor are that all activities (including security) are driven by the sponsor. This allows the sponsor to grant and revoke access as they see fit.

=== Low cost centers ===
One might think that functional sourcing is a US-based phenomenon and is not used frequently in other parts of the world due in part to physical distance as well as differences in culture, currency, and language. This, however, is untrue. The concept of low cost centers for Functional Sourcing is significant because it allows CROs to provide resources to sponsors around the clock. The idea is that resources can be located in different global locations but can still follow the same set of sponsor SOPs and can connect to the same sponsor network using the aforementioned techniques. The most considerable benefit to the sponsor is that functions can be resourced to regions of the world where the labor costs are significantly lower than the US. The cost savings to the sponsor in many cases may be as high as 60 percent of US costs. The benefit to the sponsor is obvious but this concept also benefits the CRO as it gives the CRO more versatility and allows the CRO to be more competitive.

=== Hybrid solution ===
Hybrid solutions include any situation where many outsourcing models are used in diverse and cross functional ways. Functional sourcing is an example of a hybrid solution. One of the benefits of hybrid solutions is that the models can be adjusted to meet the needs of the client. Multiple models can be used for different projects under the same sponsor.

For example, many US based companies that employ a Functionally Sourced outsourcing model are also implementing a low cost center model. As mentioned above, this allows US based CROs to augment their existing staff and maximize their resource availability. The sponsor, in turn, benefits from working with the senior management of onshore local partner while, again, taking advantage of lower costs and increased availability of the global resources.

=== Consulting and atypical projects ===
This category is left for projects that do not fit into one of the previous categories. One of the advantages to functional sourcing is that it can be used broadly across the clinical research industry. Functional sourcing can be used for large projects as a way to alleviate resource management for the sponsor. It can also be used for global projects as a way to maximize availability and reduce costs. Additionally, it can be used by small companies who want to retain control of their data but lack the full-time resources. Finally, functional sourcing provides flexibility to the sponsor when they are in need of a flexible solution.

== Trends ==
As mentioned above, the clinical trial industry has seen growth in functional sourcing over the last few years. This growth is tied to the continued adoption of functional sourcing in the industry. Having experienced success and gained significant confidence in the functional sourcing model, sponsors have decided to expand the use of this model to different areas.

In April 2009, Pharmaceutical Executive published the following regarding a major Pharmaceuticals company's use of functional sourcing: "… signals a profound shift in outsourcing practices. More and more drug companies—including Merck and Pfizer—are moving from "transactional" (capacity- and project-based) outsourcing to "functional" (competency- and portfolio-based) partnerships."
