= Dolutegravir/lamivudine/tenofovir =

Combination drug for HIV

Combination of
- Dolutegravir: Integrase strand transfer inhibitor
- Lamivudine: Nucleoside reverse transcriptase inhibitor
- Tenofovir disoproxil: Nucleoside reverse transcriptase inhibitor

Clinical data
- Other names: Tenofovir/lamivudine/dolutegravir (TLD)
- Routes of administration: By mouth
- ATC code: J05AR27 (WHO)

Legal status
- Legal status: US: ℞-only

Dolutegravir/lamivudine/tenofovir (DTG/3TC/TDF) is a fixed-dose combination antiretroviral medication used to treat HIV/AIDS. It is a combination of dolutegravir, lamivudine, and tenofovir disoproxil. As of 2019, it is listed by the World Health Organization (WHO) as the first line treatment for adults, with tenofovir/lamivudine/efavirenz as an alternative. It is taken by mouth.

Side effects may include trouble sleeping, weight gain, and rash. While there are concerns that use during pregnancy results in a 0.2% increased risk of neural tube defects in the baby, this does not rule out its use. Use remains recommended after the first trimester. Use is not recommended in those with kidney problems. The combination is a type of antiretroviral therapy.

It is on the World Health Organization's List of Essential Medicines. In some countries it is available as a generic medication. It was approved for medical use in the United States in May 2026.

== Medical uses ==
As of 2019, it is listed by the World Health Organization (WHO) as the first-line treatment for adults with HIV/AIDS, with tenofovir/lamivudine/efavirenz as an alternative. It may be used in people with both HIV and tuberculosis, however if the person is on rifampicin a larger dose of dolutegravir is needed.

== Side effects ==
Side effects may include trouble sleeping and weight gain. While there are concerns that use during pregnancy results in a 0.2% increased risk of neural tube defects in the baby, this does not rule out its use. Use remains recommended after the first trimester. It should not be used with dofetilide.

== Society and culture ==
=== Economics ===
In the developing world it costs about US$75 per year. It is considered more cost effective than tenofovir/lamivudine/efavirenz as of 2019.
