= Uniform Code of Pharmaceutical Marketing Practices 2024 =

Guidelines for Pharmaceutical Marketing Practices in India

The Uniform Code of Pharmaceutical Marketing Practices 2024 (UCPMP 2024) is a set of ethical guidelines issued by India's Department of Pharmaceuticals (DoP) to govern the marketing and promotion of pharmaceutical products to healthcare professionals and consumers in the country. It aims to ensure transparency, accuracy, and integrity in pharmaceutical advertising while preventing misleading claims, unethical inducements, and conflicts of interest. The code outlines standards for interactions with healthcare professionals, restrictions on promotional gifts, ethical advertising practices, and responsible patient education. Similar regulatory frameworks exist globally, including the PhRMA Code in the United States and the EFPIA Code of Practice in the European Union.

== History ==
The UCPMP is an extension of the Uniform Code for Pharmaceuticals Marketing Practices 2015 (UCPMP 2015), which took effect on 1 January 2015. Although there were long-standing expectations that the 2015 Code would be legally enforced, it remained a voluntary guideline for pharmaceutical companies to follow in their marketing practices.

In March 2024, DoP released the Uniform Code of Pharmaceutical Marketing Practices 2024.

In September 2024, the code was expanded to include medical device manufacturing companies.

== Standardized guidelines ==
- Drug Promotion: All promotional activities must align with approved drug indications, ensuring the information provided is factual and free from misleading claims.
- Promotional Materials: Using healthcare professionals' names in promotional materials is prohibited, and ethical marketing practices are mandated to maintain integrity in communications.
- Medical Representatives: These professionals are entrusted with upholding high ethical standards. Companies are held accountable for the conduct of their representatives, ensuring a trustworthy environment in the industry.
- Brand Reminders: Educational materials related to brand reminders can be provided, with a value limit of ₹1,000. Additionally, the distribution of free samples is permissible, provided it complies with strict conditions.
- Continuing Medical Education (CME): CME events should be conducted with full-transparency. These events, if held within India, should be publicly disclosed.
- Studies & Research: Conducting studies and research is allowed, provided regulatory approval and formal consultancy agreements are in place.
- Gifts & Hospitality: Offering personal benefits to healthcare professionals is strictly prohibited. However, travel expenses may be covered for official events related to educational purposes only.

== Enforcement and compliance ==
The Ethics Committee for Pharma Manufacturing Practices (ECPMP) is responsible for handling violations of the UCPMP, with penalties ranging from suspension to corrective actions. Appeals can be made to an Apex Committee under the DoP, which has the authority to uphold, modify, or overturn decisions. Also, the May 2024 circular issued by the DoP, confirmed that the self-declaration form applies to the 2024–25 fiscal year, effectively granting these guidelines a quasi-statutory status.
