= Alkem Laboratories =

Indian pharmaceutical private company

Alkem Laboratories Limited
- Type: Public
- Traded as: BSE: 539523; NSE: ALKEM
- Industry: Pharmaceuticals
- Founded: 1973; 53 years ago
- Founder: Samprada Singh
- Headquarters: Mumbai, Maharashtra, India
- Key people: Basudeo N. Singh (Chairman); Vikas Gupta (CEO); Sandeep Singh (MD)
- Products: Pharmaceuticals; Generic drugs; Over-the-counter drugs; Vaccines; Diagnostics; Contact lenses; animal health
- Revenue: ▲₹12,964 crore (US$1.3 billion) (2025)
- Operating income: ▲₹2,512 crore (US$260 million) (2025)
- Net income: ▲₹2,165 crore (US$220 million) (2025)
- Total assets: ▲₹17,691 crore (US$1.8 billion) (2025)
- Total equity: ▲₹12,433 crore (US$1.3 billion) (2025)
- Number of employees: 24,000 (2026)
- Subsidiaries: Pharmacor Limited, Connect2clinic, Alkem Foundation
- Website: www.alkemlabs.com
- Footnotes; Financials as of 31 March 2025.

Alkem Laboratories Limited is an Indian multinational pharmaceutical company headquartered in Mumbai. Specialising in generics and speciality pharmaceuticals, Alkem manufactures and markets pharmaceutical generics, formulations and nutraceuticals across India and global markets.

== History ==
Samprada Singh was the founder and chairman emeritus of the company; he had a B.Com degree from Patna University. His brother, Basudeo Narayan Singh, was also the co-founder of the company.

Alkem set up its research and development facility for ANDA development at Taloja in 2003. In 2006 anti-infective drug Taxim of Alkem became the first anti-infective drug in the Indian pharmaceutical industry to cross 1,000 million in terms of domestic sales in India. In 2014 Clavam another drug from Alkem crossed 2,000 million mark in terms of domestic sales in India.

In 2007 the company filed its first ANDA for drug Amlodipine which was approved in 2009. Alkem has developed a portfolio of 705 branded generic drugs, with 13 of the brands featured among the top 300 brands in India for the fiscal year 2015 and a portfolio of 705 brands in India in the six months ended 30 September 2015. Alkem have 21 manufacturing facilities, 19 in India and 2 in US. 5 of the facilities are US FDA, TGA, UK MHRA approved.

Samprada Singh (1925–2019) died on 27 July 2019 at the age of 94 after a brief illness in Mumbai. In 2018, he was the 46th richest person in India.

== Acquisitions ==
Alkem has 21 manufacturing facilities: 19 in India and 2 in the US. These 2 facilities in the US were acquired in 2012 and 2013 respectively. In 2014, Alkem acquired the "Clindac-A" brand in India from Galderma S.A. In 2015, Alkem acquired a formulation manufacturing facility in the US.
