= Alembic Pharmaceuticals =

Indian multinational pharmaceutical company private company

- Type: Public
- Traded as: BSE: 533573; NSE: APLLTD
- Industry: Pharmaceuticals
- Founded: 1907
- Headquarters: Vadodara, Gujarat, India
- Area served: Worldwide
- Key people: Chirayu Amin (Chairman & CEO); Pranav Amin (managing director); Shaunak Amin (managing director)
- Products: Pharmaceuticals, branded and generic drugs
- Revenue: ₹6,672 crore (2025)
- Net income: ₹583.42 crore (2025)
- Number of employees: 16,571 (2025)
- Parent: Nirayu Limited
- Website: www.alembicpharmaceuticals.com

Alembic Pharmaceuticals is an Indian multinational pharmaceutical company headquartered in Vadodara, Gujarat. The company manufactures and markets pharmaceutical products, including active pharmaceutical ingredients (APIs) and formulations, and has a presence in the macrolide anti-infective drug segment.

Alembic Pharmaceuticals produces formulations for therapeutic areas such as cardiology, dermatology, diabetes, ophthalmology, and infectious diseases for domestic and international markets. It operates manufacturing facilities in Gujarat (Panelav and Karakhadi), Sikkim, and Pithampur as well as research and development centres in India and the United States.

== History ==
Alembic Chemical Works Company Ltd. was established in 1907 in Vadodara, Gujarat, initially producing tinctures and alcohol. It later diversified into cough syrups, vitamins, tonics, and sulphur drugs. In the 1960s, the company began producing penicillin, with its plant inaugurated in 1961 by then Prime Minister Lal Bahadur Shastri. Bulk production of vitamin B_{12} and erythromycin started in 1971. In 1999, the company changed its name from Alembic Chemical Works Company Ltd. to Alembic Ltd.

In 2007, Alembic Ltd. acquired the non-oncology formulation business of Dabur Pharma Ltd for ₹159 crore.

In 2010, Alembic Pharmaceuticals was formed after a demerger from Alembic Ltd. The demerger was carried out through the allotment of 133,515,914 equity shares of ₹2 each to Alembic Ltd. shareholders, reducing Alembic Ltd.’s stake to 29.18%. Shares of Alembic Pharmaceuticals were listed on the Bombay Stock Exchange and National Stock Exchange on 20 September 2011, following the demerger.

In 2014, Alembic Pharmaceuticals formed a joint venture with Adwiya Mami SARL to enter Algeria. In 2017, the company acquired Orit Laboratories LLC. USA. In 2019, it entered the Chinese market through a joint venture.

In 2022, Alembic Pharmaceuticals acquired 100% stake in Aleor Dermaceuticals Ltd. and merged it with the company. In 2025, the U.S. subsidiary of Alembic Pharmaceuticals acquired Utility Therapeutics Ltd, which produces the urinary tract infection drug Pivya (pivmecillinam 185 mg), for US$12 million.

== Regulatory approvals ==
Between 2024 and 2025, Alembic Pharmaceuticals obtained multiple final and tentative approvals from the United States Food and Drug Administration (US FDA) for generic medicines. In December 2024, the company received tentative approval for Olopatadine Hydrochloride Ophthalmic Solution 0.7%, a generic version of Pataday Once Daily Relief. This was followed by final approval for Rivaroxaban tablets in strengths of 2.5 mg, 10 mg, 15 mg, and 20 mg, therapeutically equivalent to Xarelto in May 2025, and for Amlodipine and Atorvastatin tablets in multiple strengths, equivalent to Caduet. In June 2025, Alembic Pharmaceuticals received final approval for Doxorubicin Hydrochloride Liposome Injection (20 mg/10 mL and 50 mg/25 mL), a generic version of Doxil, indicated for certain cancers. In August 2025, it obtained final approval for Tretinoin Cream USP 0.025%, equivalent to Retin-A, for the treatment of acne vulgaris. During this period, the company's cumulative Abbreviated New Drug Application (ANDA) approvals from the US FDA increased from 219 to 223, including both final and tentative approvals. These products were added to the company's portfolio in therapeutic segments such as oncology, cardiovascular diseases, dermatology, and ophthalmology.

== Products and services ==
Alembic Pharmaceuticals manufactures and sells pharmaceutical products and active pharmaceutical ingredients (APIs). Its operations include international and domestic formulations, with the latter comprising branded and generic drugs.

=== Therapies ===
Alembic Pharmaceuticals has operations in therapy areas, including dermatology, cardiology, gastroenterology, ophthalmology, oncology, orthopedics, anti-infectives, anti-diabetics, gynecology, and treatments for cold and cough. Alembic Pharmaceuticals’s API plants are cGMP-compliant and have received approvals from various international regulatory agencies. The company operates two research and development (R&D) centers and reported an investment of ₹530 crore in R&D as of 31 March 2025.

=== Animal Health Division ===
Alembic Pharmaceuticals established its Animal Health Division in 1986. The division develops pharmaceutical products for livestock, poultry, and companion animals. Among its formulations are Sharkoferrol, an oral hematinic, Moxel Inj, a preparation of amoxicillin and cloxacillin, and injectable cephalosporins such as Xceft Inj (ceftiofur sodium) and Mceft Inj (ceftizoxime sodium). In 2024, the division entered into a strategic agreement with Amlan International to distribute mineral-based feed additives for poultry health in India.

== See also ==
- List of pharmaceutical companies
- Pharmaceutical industry in India
- Torrent Pharmaceuticals
- Zydus Lifesciences
- Cadila Pharmaceuticals
- Intas Pharmaceuticals
