= Galenic formulation =

Preparation of drugs for absorptive optimization

Galenic formulation deals with the principles of preparing and compounding medicines in order to optimize their absorption. Galenic formulation is named after Claudius Galen, a 2nd Century AD Greek physician, who codified the preparation of drugs using multiple ingredients. Today, galenic formulation is part of pharmaceutical formulation. The pharmaceutical formulation of a medicine affects the pharmacokinetics, pharmacodynamics and safety profile of a drug.

== See also ==
- Formulations
- Pharmaceutical formulation
- ADME
- Pharmacology
- Medicinal chemistry
- Pesticide formulation
