= Unichem Laboratories =

Indian pharmaceutical business

- Type: Public
- Traded as: BSE: 506690; NSE: UNICHEMLAB
- Industry: Pharmaceutical & healthcare
- Founded: 1944, Mumbai
- Headquarters: Mumbai, Maharashtra, India
- Area served: Worldwide
- Key people: Pabitrakumar Kalipada Bhattacharya (MD)
- Number of employees: 3,100+
- Subsidiaries: Unichem Pharmaceuticals (USA) INC; Niche Generics Limited; Unichem Laboratories Limited, Ireland; Unichem FarmaceuticaDo Brasil Ltda, Brazil; Unichem SA (Pty) Limited, South Africa
- Website: www.unichemlabs.com

Unichem Laboratories is an Indian pharmaceutical company, headquartered in Mumbai. It manufactures and markets pharmaceutical formulations across the globe, including the regulated markets of the US and Europe.

== History ==
Unichem Laboratories was founded in 1944 by Padma Bhushan Amrut V Mody, a pioneer in the Indian pharmaceuticals business.

The initial public offering of Unichem Laboratories Limited was in 1963, after its registration in 1962, and the company was consequently listed on BSE Limited and NSE Limited.

Unichem Laboratories Limited is currently active in finished formulations, APIs, contract manufacturing, custom synthesis, etc. Their R & D site at Goa has expertise in product development, process chemistry and developing complex APIs for global market.

In September 2023, Ipca Laboratories acquired 19% stake of Unichem Laboratories.

== Operations ==
Unichem's Formulations manufacturing facilities are located at Goa, Ghaziabad (Uttar Pradesh) and Baddi (Himachal Pradesh). Active Pharmaceutical Ingredient (API) manufacturing facilities are located at Roha (Maharashtra), Pithampur (Madhya Pradesh) and Kolhapur (Maharashtra). Goa, Ghaziabad, Roha, Pithampur and Kolhapur sites are USFDA approved and all the plants are approved from other major health authorities.

The Company's facilities have been approved by various International health authorities such as USFDA, UK MHRA, ANVISA (Brazil), COFEPRIS (Mexico), PMDA (Japan), TGA (Australia), SAPHRA (South Africa) and MFDS(Korea), EDQM (European Directorate for the Quality of Medicines), TPD (Canada).

== Research and Development ==
The Company has set up a Research & Development (R & D) Centre at Goa. The R & D Centre concentrates on developing NDDS for generic APIs and NCEs, reverse engineering the API processes, drug discovery and bio catalysis. The Company has strategic alliances with global players for CRAMS and other projects. The Company has a functional Biotech R&D Centre and a Pilot Plant at Goa. Bio-similar R&D is based on recombinant DNA platform. Microbial fermentation and protein purification are its strengths. The cell culture facility in the Biotech R&D is capable of handling mammalian cell lines for screening novel biological and chemical entities.

The Company has made more than 500 product registrations across the world. It has more than 70 US ANDA filings, 45 approved ANDAs and more than 60 European submissions. The Company holds 75 US DMF, 26 Certificate of suitability to European Pharmacopeia (CEP) issued by the European Directorate for the Quality of Medicines and Healthcare (EDQM) and several DMFs across the world.
