= Conglomerate =

Conglomerate or conglomeration may refer to:

- Conglomerate (company)
- Conglomerate (geology)
- Conglomerate (mathematics)

In popular culture:

- The Conglomerate (American group), a production crew and musical group founded by Busta Rhymes
  - Conglomerate (record label), a hip hop label founded by Busta Rhymes
- The Conglomerate (Australian group), a jazz quartet

== See also ==
- Agglomerate
- Conglomerate Ridge, in the Ellsworth Mountains, Antarctica
- ConGlomeration (convention)
