= Torrent Pharmaceuticals =

Indian multinational pharmaceutical company

Torrent Pharmaceuticals Limited
- Formerly: Trinity Laboratories (1959–1971)
- Type: Public
- Traded as: BSE: 500420; NSE: TORNTPHARM
- ISIN: INE685A01028
- Industry: Pharmaceuticals
- Founded: 1959; 67 years ago
- Founder: U. N. Mehta
- Headquarters: Ahmedabad, Gujarat, India
- Area served: Worldwide
- Key people: Sudhir Mehta (Chairman Emeritus); Samir Mehta (Chairman); Aman Mehta (Managing director)
- Products: Pharmaceuticals; Generic drugs; Over-the-counter drugs; Vaccines; Diagnostics; Contact lenses; Animal health
- Revenue: ▲₹11,516 crore (US$1.2 billion) (2025)
- Operating income: ▲₹3,721 crore (US$390 million) (2025)
- Net income: ▲₹1,911 crore (US$200 million) (2025)
- Total assets: ▼₹14,990 crore (US$1.6 billion) (2025)
- Total equity: ▲₹7,591 crore (US$790 million) (2025)
- Number of employees: 12,881 (2020)
- Parent: Torrent Group
- Website: www.torrentpharma.com
- Footnotes; Financials as of 31 March 2025.

Torrent Pharmaceuticals Ltd, d/b/a Torrent Pharma, is an Indian multinational pharmaceutical company, part of the Torrent Group and headquartered in Ahmedabad. It was promoted by U. N. Mehta, initially as Trinity Laboratories Ltd, and was later renamed Torrent Pharmaceuticals Ltd.

Torrent Pharmaceuticals operates in more than 40 countries with over 2,000 product registrations globally. Torrent Pharma is active in the therapeutic areas of cardiovascular, central nervous system, gastro-intestinal, diabetology, anti-infective and pain management segments. It also has a presence in therapeutic segments of nephrology, oncology, gynecology, respiratory and pediatrics.

== History ==
Torrent Pharmaceuticals was established in 1959 by U. N. Mehta as Trinity Laboratories. It was renamed Torrent Pharmaceuticals in 1971.

In 1997, Torrent Pharma and Sanofi established a 50:50 joint venture called Sanofi Torrent for selling Torrent Pharma's products. Torrent exited the joint venture by selling its stake to Sanofi in 2002.

In 2005, Torrent Pharmaceuticals acquired Heumann Pharma Generics GmbH, a Pfizer company based in Germany.

In 2013, Torrent Pharma acquired the India formulations business of Elder Pharmaceuticals for ₹2,004 crore (US$341.99 million).

In 2017, Torrent Pharma acquired the domestic business of Unichem Laboratories for ₹3,600 crore (US$552.81 million).

In 2022, the company acquired skincare manufacturer Curatio Healthcare for ₹2,000 crore (US$254.44 million).

== Recalls ==
In 2018, Torrent Pharmaceuticals recalled tablets containing valsartan and losartan due to the detection of N-nitrosodimethylamine (NDMA) and N-nitrosodiethylamine (NDEA) respectively which are probable human carcinogens.

In September 2019, the FDA issued notice of a sixth product recall of losartan by Torrent Pharmaceuticals when certain batches of losartan contained the contaminant, N-methylnitrosobutyric acid (NMBA), above acceptable daily intake levels determined by the FDA.

== See also ==
- Pharmaceutical industry in India
