= Contract manufacturing organization =

Pharmaceutical manufacturing outsourcing organization

A contract manufacturing organization (CMO), more recently referred to (and more commonly used now) as a contract development and manufacturing organization (CDMO) to avoid the acronym confusion of Chief Medical Officer or Clinical Monitoring Organization in the pharma industry, is a company that serves other companies in the pharmaceutical industry on a contract basis to provide comprehensive services from drug development through drug manufacturing. This allows major pharmaceutical companies to outsource those aspects of the business, which can help with scalability or can allow the major company to focus on drug discovery and drug marketing instead.

Services offered by CDMOs include, but are not limited to:

- pre-formulation,
- formulation development,
- stability studies,
- method development,
- pre-clinical and Phase I clinical trial materials,
- late-stage clinical trial materials,
- formal stability,
- scale-up,
- registration batches and commercial production.

CDMOs are contract manufacturers, yet they provide development as a standard part of their services.

Their customers are not only expecting competitive pricing, but also regulatory compliance, flexibility on the production capability and on-time delivery. Overall it is required that CMO complies with good manufacturing practice from their client and regulatory bodies such as the Food and Drug Administration.

== Overview ==
The pharmaceutical market uses outsourcing services from providers in the form of contract research organizations (CROs) who work on very early-stage drug development on very small scale providing medicinal chemistry services. These are now often called CDROs as they provide some small scale development work. CDMOs work on the scale-up and later stages of drug development often preparing materials ranging from hundreds of grams to multi-kilo amounts. As the drug moves through the various clinical stages, the volumes tend to grow as well. Commercial scale amounts could range to metric tons. Over the years, the concept of a comprehensive single-source provider from drug development (a one-stop shop) through commercial manufacture of drug substance and drug product has been tried to varying success.

CDMOs are a response to the competitive international nature of the pharmaceutical market as well as the increasing demand for outsourced services. The best-positioned service providers focus on a specific technology or dosage form and promote end-to-end continuity and efficiency for their outsourcing clients. With lower-cost international manufacturers capturing an increasing percentage of the contract manufacturing market, specialization may be an effective hedge against loss of market share.

== History ==
Before the 2008 financial crisis, 75% of the candidate that outsourced services were small and mid-sized biotechnology and pharmaceutical companies. Following the 2008 financial crisis, the CMO industry started to be funded by private equity as a result of a substantial growth and a more qualified management. The one-stop CDMO concept could be the direction the industry is heading by offering the whole spectrum of development services (e.g. development, production and analysis).

The acquisitions that have been finalized in 2017 in CMO and CDMO industry brought some of these companies to a level that allows them to compete with global bio/pharma companies. The value of the mergers and acquisitions in 2017 was likely to exceed $20 billion, below are some examples of these M&A:

Another aspect of these acquisitions is coming from CMO that are acquiring manufacturing site from bio/pharma companies. In 2017, Pfizer established a manufacturing site in Liscate, Italy, which was followed that same year by AstraZeneca in Reims, France. Novartis Sandoz acquired a site in Boucherville, Canada in 2018, as well as Glaxo Smith Kline, which began manufacturing out of South Carolina in the United States. Samsung Biologics built three manufacturing plants with a capacity of more than 360,000 liters, making it the world's largest contract-based manufacturer in the biopharmaceutical sector at a single site as of 2018.

The industry has experienced an increase in private equity investment and this has led to the consolidation of choices in the CDMO industry as many larger CDMOs have been formed. Many of those are active at aiming to be larger scale suppliers in the CDMO environment but the number of attractive acquisitions are limited. One could argue that this has had both positive and negative effects on the industry. Larger pharma companies like the idea of a larger CDMO while smaller pharma companies tend to see it more difficult to get the kind of service they expect.

== Advantages ==
The bio/pharma companies used to build and staff dedicated manufacturing capacities for drugs in development only to see them canceled if the product failed in Phase III of clinical research; working with a CDMO limits that financial risk. Using a CDMO also allows drug and biologic manufacturers to get advantage of specific expertise and capability. Some CDMOs are specialized in manufacturing of specialty products or formulations which some pharmaceutical companies may not have the capability to produce in-house. In these situations, contracting with a CDMO may be a faster and less costly solution than developing new manufacturing capabilities.

Accelerated development timelines

In addition to reducing cost and providing specialized expertise, CDMOs can also shorten the time needed to bring drug candidates to regulatory submission. A 2025 report by PharmaSource described a small-molecule program managed by the CDMO BioDuro that advanced to Investigational New Drug (IND) submission in approximately 11 months, compared to the multi-year timelines often seen in traditional development. The acceleration was attributed to parallel workstreams in active pharmaceutical ingredient (API) synthesis and drug-product formulation, a unified quality system, and dedicated project management support that streamlined communication between teams.

== Disadvantages ==
The pharmaceutical client using the services of a CDMO does not have direct control of the project in regard to scheduling, cost, quality, or accountability yet should be heavily invested to work closely with the CDMO partner to ensure success. Data security can be an issue when considering a CDMO, as intellectual property and other proprietary data are exchanged between client and service provider.

One of the major risk remains in the lack of control over the CDMO's compliance for the client, for example when an FDA warning letter is issued, a resulting interruption of production may result in major delay or interruption of shipping thus it is critical to properly vet the selected CDMO. The rise of the CDMO industry led to an increase of inspectors from various divisions of the Food and Drug Administration (e.g.: Center for Biologics Evaluation and Research or Center for Drug Evaluation and Research).

== See also ==
- Contract packager
- Functional sourcing
- Outsourcing
