= Pharmaceutical formulation =

Process for producing a final medicinal product

Pharmaceutical formulation, in pharmaceutics, is the process in which the active drug or Active Pharmaceutical Ingredient (API) is combined with different chemical substances to produce a final medicinal product. The word formulation is often used in a way that includes dosage form.

== Stages and timeline ==
Formulation studies include developing a preparation of the drug which is both stable and acceptable to the patients. For orally administered drugs, this usually implies incorporating the drug in a tablet or a capsule. It is important to make the distinction that a tablet contains a variety of other potentially inert substances apart from the drug itself, and studies have to be carried out to ensure that the encapsulated drug is compatible with these other substances in a way that does not cause harm, whether direct or indirect.

Preformulation involves the characterization of a drug's physical, chemical, and mechanical properties in order to choose what other ingredients (excipients) should be used in the preparation. In dealing with protein pre-formulation, the important aspect is to understand the solution behavior of a given protein under a variety of stress conditions such as freeze/thaw, temperature, shear stress among others to identify mechanisms of degradation and therefore its mitigation.

Formulation studies then consider such factors as particle size, polymorphism, pH, and solubility, as all of these can influence bioavailability and hence the activity of a drug. The drug must be combined with inactive ingredients by a method that ensures that the quantity of drug present is consistent in each dosage unit e.g. each tablet. The dosage should have a uniform appearance, with an acceptable taste, tablet hardness, and capsule disintegration.

It is unlikely that formulation studies will be complete by the time clinical trials start. This means that simple preparations are developed initially for use in phase I clinical trials. These typically consist of hand-filled capsules containing a small amount of the drug and a diluent. Proof of the long-term stability of these formulations is not required, as they will be used (tested) in a matter of days. Consideration has to be given to what is known as "drug loading" - the ratio of the active drug to the total contents of the dose. A low drug load may cause homogeneity problems. A high drug load may pose flow problems or require large capsules if the compound has a low bulk density.

By the time phase III clinical trials are reached, the formulation of the drug should have been developed to be close to the preparation that will ultimately be used in the market. A knowledge of stability is essential by this stage, and conditions must have been developed to ensure that the drug is stable in the preparation. If the drug proves unstable, it will invalidate the results from clinical trials since it would be impossible to know what the administered dose actually was. Stability studies are carried out to test whether temperature, humidity, oxidation, or photolysis (ultraviolet light or visible light) have any effect, and the preparation is analysed to see if any degradation products have been formed.

=== Container closure ===
Formulated drugs are stored in container closure systems for extended periods of time. These include blisters, bottles, vials, ampules, syringes, and cartridges. The containers can be made from a variety of materials including glass, plastic, and metal. The drug may be stored as a solid, liquid, or gas.

It's important to check whether there are any undesired interactions between the preparation and the container. For instance, if a plastic container is used, tests are carried out to see whether any of the ingredients become adsorbed on to the plastic, and whether any plasticizer, lubricants, pigments, or stabilizers leach out of the plastic into the preparation. Even the adhesives for the container label need to be tested, to ensure they do not leach through the plastic container into the preparation.

== Formulation types ==
The drug form varies by its way to be administered into the body called route of administration including oral, sublingual, transdermal and inhalation delivery It can be delivered as capsules, tablets, granules, pills etc.

== Enteral formulations ==
Oral drugs are commonly taken as tablets or capsules.

The drug (active substance) itself needs to be soluble in aqueous solution at a controlled rate. Such factors as particle size and crystal form can significantly affect dissolution. Fast dissolution is not always ideal. For example, slow dissolution rates can prolong the duration of action or avoid initial high plasma levels. Treatment of active ingredient by special ways such as spherical crystallization can have some advantages for drug formulation.

=== Tablet ===
A tablet is usually a compressed preparation that contains:

- 5-10% of the drug (active substance);
- 80% of fillers, disintegrants, lubricants, glidants, and binders; and
- 10% of compounds which ensure easy disintegration, disaggregation, and dissolution of the tablet in the stomach or the intestine.

The dissolution time can be modified for a rapid effect or for sustained release.

Special coatings can make the tablet resistant to the stomach acids such that it only disintegrates in the duodenum, jejunum and colon as a result of enzyme action or alkaline pH.

Pills can be coated with sugar, varnish, or wax to disguise the taste. Pharmaceutical ingredients such as APIs can also be coated with a ResonantAcoustic mixer for controlled release and taste-masking.

=== Capsule ===
A capsule is a gelatinous envelope enclosing the active substance. Capsules can be designed to remain intact for some hours after ingestion in order to delay absorption. They may also contain a mixture of slow and fast release particles to produce rapid and sustained absorption in the same dose.

=== Sustained release ===
There are several methods by which tablets and capsules can be modified in order to allow for sustained release of the active compound as it passes through the digestive tract. One of the most common methods is to embed the active ingredient in an insoluble porous matrix, such that the dissolving drug must make its way out of the matrix before it can be absorbed. In other sustained release formulations the matrix swells to form a gel through which the drug exits.

Another method by which sustained release is achieved is through an osmotic controlled-release oral delivery system, where the active compound is encased in a water-permeable membrane with a laser drilled hole at one end. As water passes through the membrane the drug is pushed out through the hole and into the digestive tract where it can be absorbed.

== Parenteral formulations ==
These are also called injectable formulations and are used with intravenous, subcutaneous, intramuscular, and intra-articular administration. The drug is stored in liquid or if unstable, lyophilized form.

Many parenteral formulations are unstable at higher temperatures and require storage at refrigerated or sometimes frozen conditions. The logistics process of delivering these drugs to the patient is called the cold chain. The cold chain can interfere with delivery of drugs, especially vaccines, to communities where electricity is unpredictable or nonexistent. NGOs like the Gates Foundation are actively working to find solutions. These may include lyophilized formulations which are easier to stabilize at room temperature.

Most protein formulations are parenteral due to the fragile nature of the molecule which would be destroyed by enteric administration. Proteins have tertiary and quaternary structures that can be degraded or aggregated at room temperature. This can impact the safety and efficacy of the medicine.

=== Liquid ===
Liquid drugs are stored in vials, IV bags, ampoules, cartridges, and prefilled syringes.

As with solid formulations, liquid formulations combine the drug product with a variety of compounds to ensure a stable active medication following storage. These include solubilizers, stabilizers, buffers, tonicity modifiers, bulking agents, viscosity enhancers/reducers, surfactants, chelating agents, and adjuvants and also lipid-based carriers.

If concentrated by evaporation, the drug may be diluted before administration. For IV administration, the drug may be transferred from a vial to an IV bag and mixed with other materials.

For some populations, notably children, where liquid formulation is required but there is no licensed liquid formulation, a modification of an existing solid formulation to create a liquid formulation is sometimes undertaken. There are risks associated with this.

=== Lyophilized ===
Lyophilized drugs are stored in vials, cartridges, dual chamber syringes, and prefilled mixing systems.

Lyophilization, or freeze drying, is a process that removes water from a liquid drug creating a solid powder, or cake. The lyophilized product is stable for extended periods of time and could allow storage at higher temperatures. In protein formulations, stabilizers are added to replace the water and preserve the structure of the molecule.

Before administration, a lyophilized drug is reconstituted as a liquid before being administered. This is done by combining a liquid diluent with the freeze-dried powder, mixing, then injecting. Reconstitution usually requires a reconstitution and delivery system to ensure that the drug is correctly mixed and administered.

== Topical formulations ==
=== Cutaneous ===
Options for topical formulation include:

- Cream – Emulsion of oil and water in approximately equal proportions. Penetrates stratum corneum outer layers of skin well.
- Ointment – Combines oil (80%) and water (20%). Effective barrier against moisture loss.
- Gel – Liquefies upon contact with the skin.
- Paste – Combines three agents – oil, water, and powder; an ointment in which a powder is suspended.
- Powder – A finely subdivided solid substance.

== See also ==
- Pesticide formulation
- Drug development
  - Drug delivery
  - Drug design
  - Drug discovery
- Galenic formulation
