= L-165041 =

Chemical compound

Clinical data
- Pregnancy category: N/A

Legal status
- Legal status: Investigational

Identifiers
- IUPAC name: [4-[3-(4-Acetyl-3-hydroxy-2-propylphenoxy)propoxy]phenoxy]acetic acid
- CAS Number: 79558-09-1
- PubChem CID: 6603901
- IUPHAR/BPS: 2691
- DrugBank: DB08078
- ChemSpider: 5036209
- UNII: 7RV682Z3FQ
- CompTox Dashboard (EPA): DTXSID6040745

Chemical and physical data
- Formula: C_{22}H_{26}O_{7}
- Molar mass: 402.443 g·mol^{−1}
- 3D model (JSmol): Interactive image
- SMILES: CCCc1c(ccc(c1O)C(=O)C)OCCCOc2ccc(cc2)OCC(=O)O
- InChI: InChI=1S/C22H26O7/c1-3-5-19-20(11-10-18(15(2)23)22(19)26)28-13-4-12-27-16-6-8-17(9-7-16)29-14-21(24)25/h6-11,26H,3-5,12-14H2,1-2H3,(H,24,25); Key:HBBVCKCCQCQCTJ-UHFFFAOYSA-N

L-165041 is a phenyloxyacetate PPARδ receptor agonist. It is less potent and PPARδ selective than GW 501516.

== See also ==
- GW 501516
- GFT505
- MBX-8025
- GW0742
- Peroxisome proliferator-activated receptor
