= Sodelglitazar =

Chemical compound

Clinical data
- Pregnancy category: N/A
- ATC code: None

Legal status
- Legal status: Investigational

Identifiers
- IUPAC name: [4-[[[2-[2-Fluoro-4-(trifluoromethyl)phenyl]-4-methyl-1,3-thiazol-5-yl]methyl]sulfanyl]-2-methylphenoxy]-2-methylpropanoic acid
- CAS Number: 447406-78-2
- PubChem CID: 9805950
- ChemSpider: 7981710
- UNII: 6G973E04VI
- KEGG: D06647
- ChEMBL: ChEMBL2104984
- CompTox Dashboard (EPA): DTXSID90196289

Chemical and physical data
- Formula: C_{23}H_{21}F_{4}NO_{3}S_{2}
- Molar mass: 499.54 g·mol^{−1}
- 3D model (JSmol): Interactive image
- SMILES: CC1=C(C=CC(=C1)SCC2=C(N=C(S2)C3=C(C=C(C=C3)C(F)(F)F)F)C)OC(C)(C)C(=O)O
- InChI: InChI=1S/C23H21F4NO3S2/c1-12-9-15(6-8-18(12)31-22(3,4)21(29)30)32-11-19-13(2)28-20(33-19)16-7-5-14(10-17(16)24)23(25,26)27/h5-10H,11H2,1-4H3,(H,29,30); Key:ZUGQWAYOWCBWGM-UHFFFAOYSA-N

Sodelglitazar, formerly known as GW 677954, is a thiazole PPARδ receptor agonist developed by GlaxoSmithKline. While it is primarily active at the PPARδ receptor, it is considered a pan agonist with activity at PPARα and PPARγ receptors.

== Safety ==
Phase 2 studies were terminated prior to completion due to safety findings in rodent studies.

== See also ==
- Elafibranor
- GW0742
- GW501516
- MBX-8025
- Peroxisome proliferator-activated receptor
