= Ramanbhai =

Ramanbhai is a given name. People with the given name include:

- Ramanbhai Patel
- Ramanbhai Solanki
- Ramanbhai Dhulabhai Patel
- Ramanbhai Neelkanth
- Ramanbhai Patel (cricketer)
- Dilipbhai Ramanbhai Parikh
- Pankaj Ramanbhai Patel
- Jayantbhai Ramanbhai Patel
