= Estianeptine =

Clinical data
- Other names: (S)-Tianeptine; S-Tianeptine; TNX-4300; TNX4300
- Routes of administration: Oral
- Drug class: Peroxisome proliferator-activated receptor (PPAR) agonist; PPARβ/δ and PPARγ agonist

Identifiers
- IUPAC name: 7-[[(11S)-3-chloro-6-methyl-5,5-dioxo-11H-benzo[c][2,1]benzothiazepin-11-yl]amino]heptanoic acid
- PubChem CID: 11704779
- ChemSpider: 9879502
- ChEBI: CHEBI:190006
- ChEMBL: ChEMBL4793305

Chemical and physical data
- Formula: C_{21}H_{25}ClN_{2}O_{4}S
- Molar mass: 436.95 g·mol^{−1}
- 3D model (JSmol): Interactive image
- SMILES: CN1C2=CC=CC=C2[C@@H](C3=C(S1(=O)=O)C=C(C=C3)Cl)NCCCCCCC(=O)O
- InChI: InChI=1S/C21H25ClN2O4S/c1-24-18-9-6-5-8-16(18)21(23-13-7-3-2-4-10-20(25)26)17-12-11-15(22)14-19(17)29(24,27)28/h5-6,8-9,11-12,14,21,23H,2-4,7,10,13H2,1H3,(H,25,26)/t21-/m0/s1; Key:JICJBGPOMZQUBB-NRFANRHFSA-N

Estianeptine, also known as (S)-tianeptine and by its developmental code name TNX-4300, is a peroxisome proliferator-activated receptor (PPAR) agonist and atypical tricyclic antidepressant (TCA) which is under development for the treatment of Alzheimer's disease, bipolar disorders, major depressive disorder, and Parkinson's disease. It is taken orally.

== Pharmacology ==
Estianeptine is the (S)- enantiomer of the atypical tricyclic antidepressant (TCA) and weak opioid tianeptine. It acts as a selective PPARβ/δ and PPARγ agonist. The drug has been found to promote neuroplasticity in vitro, which is thought to be mediated by its PPAR agonism. In addition, it has been found to improve cognition and memory in rodents. In contrast to tianeptine and (R)-tianeptine, estianeptine shows no activity as a μ-opioid receptor (MOR) agonist. Moreover, unlike estianeptine, (R)-tianeptine has no activity as a PPAR agonist. It has been proposed that estianeptine, via its PPAR agonism, is responsible for the antidepressant effects of tianeptine, rather than tianeptine's weak MOR agonism that manifests at high doses being responsible. Tianeptine's PPAR agonism may also be responsible for the drug's anti-inflammatory effects.

== History ==
Estianeptine was first described in the scientific literature by 1997. It is being developed by Tonix Pharmaceuticals. As of August 2023, the drug is in the preclinical research stage of development for all indications. Tianeptine's PPAR agonism was first described in 2022.

== See also ==
- Tianeptine
- List of investigational antidepressants
- Tianeptine/naloxone
- Tianeptinaline
