= PPAR agonist =

Drug used for the treatment of symptoms of metabolic syndrome

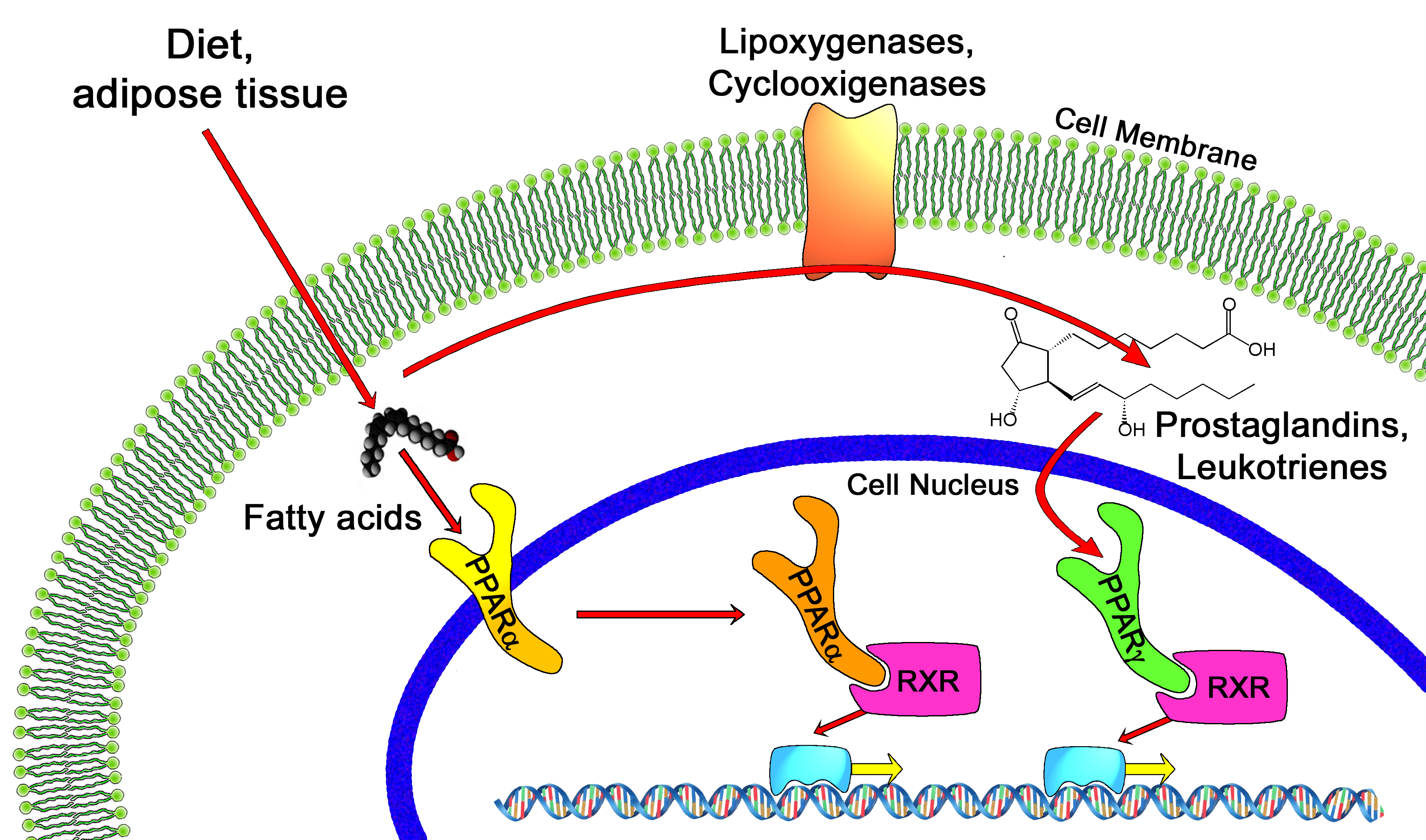
PPAR-alpha and -gamma pathways

PPAR agonists are drugs which act upon the peroxisome proliferator-activated receptor. They are used for the treatment of symptoms of the metabolic syndrome, mainly for lowering triglycerides and blood sugar.

== Classification ==
PPAR-alpha and PPAR-gamma are the molecular targets of a number of marketed drugs. The main classes of PPAR agonists are:

=== PPAR-alpha agonists ===
An endogenous compound, 7(S)-Hydroxydocosahexaenoic Acid (7(S)-HDHA), which is a docosanoid derivative of the omega-3 fatty acid DHA was isolated as an endogenous high affinity ligand for PPAR-alpha in the rat and mouse brain. The 7(S) enantiomer bound with micromolar affity to PPAR alpha with 10 fold higher affinity compared to the (R) enantiomer and could trigger dendritic activation. PPARα (alpha) is the main target of fibrate drugs, a class of amphipathic carboxylic acids (clofibrate, gemfibrozil, ciprofibrate, bezafibrate, pemafibrate and fenofibrate). They were originally indicated for dyslipidemia of cholesterol and more recently for disorders characterized by high triglycerides.

=== PPAR-gamma agonists ===
PPARγ (gamma) is the main target of the drug class of thiazolidinediones (TZDs), used in diabetes mellitus and other diseases that feature insulin resistance. It is also mildly activated by certain NSAIDs (such as ibuprofen) and indoles, as well as from a number of natural compounds. Known inhibitors include the experimental agent GW-9662.

They are also used in treating hyperlipidaemia in atherosclerosis. Here they act by increasing the expression of ABCA1, which transports extra-hepatic cholesterol into HDL. Increased uptake and excretion from the liver therefore follows.

Animal studies have shown their possible role in amelioration of pulmonary inflammation, especially in asthma.

=== PPAR-delta agonists ===
PPARδ (delta) is the main target of a research chemical named GW501516. It has been shown that agonism of PPARδ changes the body's fuel preference from glucose to lipids. In August 2024, seladelpar became the first PPARδ agonist to be approved for clinical use.

=== Dual and pan PPAR agonists ===
A fourth class of dual PPAR agonists, so-called glitazars, which bind to both the α and γ PPAR isoforms, are currently under active investigation for treatment of a larger subset of the symptoms of the metabolic syndrome. These include the experimental compounds aleglitazar, muraglitazar, oxeglitazar, naveglitazar and tesaglitazar. In June 2013, saroglitazar was the first glitazar to be approved for clinical use, followed by chiglitazar in October 2021.

The dual PPARα/δ agonist elafibranor was approved for clinical use in June 2024. In addition, there is continuing research and development of new γ/δ PPAR agonists for additional therapeutic indications, as well as "pan" agonists acting on all three isoforms.

The anti-hypertension drug telmisartan is known to have PPAR γ/δ dual partial agonist activity in vivo. It also activates PPAR-α in vitro.

== Research ==
A relatively recent avenue of drug research in treating depression and drug addiction is through PPARα and PPARγ activation. Both TLR4-mediated and NF-κB-mediated signalling pathways have been implicated in the development of addiction to several drugs such as opioids and cocaine, and therefore are appealing targets for pharmacotherapy. Despite a breadth of preclinical research showing potential in animal models in the treatment of drug addictions including alcohol, nicotine, cocaine, opioids and methamphetamine, the human evidence is limited with the amount of trials looking at using PPAR agonists for humans still being low; and so far (as of 2020) not being particularly promising. There are several suggested hypotheses for the poor translation from animal to human research evidence such as the potency and selectivity of PPAR ligands, sex-related variability, and species differences in the distribution and signaling of PPAR.
