= GW501516 =

Abandoned metabolic and cardiovascular drug

Clinical data
- Other names: GW-501,516, GW1516, GSK-516, cardarine, endurobol
- Pregnancy category: N/A
- Routes of administration: By mouth
- ATC code: none

Legal status
- Legal status: AU: Scheduled as illegal from June 2018; UK: Unscheduled; US: Unscheduled

Identifiers
- IUPAC name: {2-methyl-4-[({4-methyl-2-[4-(trifluoromethyl)phenyl]-1,3-thiazol-5-yl}methyl)sulfanyl]-2-methylphenoxy}acetic acid
- CAS Number: 317318-70-0
- PubChem CID: 9803963
- IUPHAR/BPS: 2687
- ChemSpider: 7979723
- UNII: 7I2HA1NU22
- ChEBI: CHEBI:73726
- ChEMBL: ChEMBL38943
- CompTox Dashboard (EPA): DTXSID3041037

Chemical and physical data
- Formula: C_{21}H_{18}F_{3}NO_{3}S_{2}
- Molar mass: 453.49 g·mol^{−1}
- 3D model (JSmol): Interactive image
- SMILES: O=C(COc1ccc(SCc2c(C)nc(c3ccc(C(F)(F)F)cc3)s2)cc1C)O
- InChI: InChI=1S/C21H18F3NO3S2/c1-12-9-16(7-8-17(12)28-10-19(26)27)29-11-18-13(2)25-20(30-18)14-3-5-15(6-4-14)21(22,23)24/h3-9H,10-11H2,1-2H3,(H,26,27); Key:YDBLKRPLXZNVNB-UHFFFAOYSA-N

GW501516 (also known as GW-501,516, GW1516, GSK-516, cardarine, and amongst performance enhancing drug communities as endurobol) is a PPARδ receptor agonist that was invented in a collaboration between Ligand Pharmaceuticals and GlaxoSmithKline in the 1990s. It entered into clinical development as a drug candidate for metabolic and cardiovascular diseases, but was abandoned in 2007 because animal testing showed that the drug caused cancer to develop rapidly in several organs.

In 2007, research was published showing that high doses of GW501516 given to mice dramatically improved their physical performance; the work was widely discussed in popular media, and led to a black market for the drug candidate and to its abuse by athletes as a doping agent. The World Anti-Doping Agency (WADA) developed a test for GW501516 and other related chemicals and added them to the prohibited list in 2009; it has issued additional warnings to athletes that GW501516 is not safe.

== History ==
GW501516 was initially discovered during a research collaboration between GSK and Ligand Pharmaceuticals that began in 1992. The discovery of the compound was published in a 2001 issue of PNAS. Oliver et al. reported that they used "combinatorial chemistry and structure-based drug design" to develop it. One of the authors was the son of Leo Sternbach who discovered benzodiazepines in the 1960s.

R & D Focus Drug News reported that GSK began phase I trials of the compound for the treatment of hyperlipidemia in 2000 followed by phase I/II in 2002. In 2003, Ligand Pharmaceuticals earned a $1 million payment as a result of GSK continuing phase I development.

By 2007, GW501516 had completed two phase II clinical studies and other studies relating to obesity, diabetes, dyslipidemia, and cardiovascular disease, but GSK abandoned further development of the drug in 2007 for reasons which were not disclosed at the time. It later emerged that the drug was discontinued because animal testing showed that the drug caused cancer to develop rapidly in several organs, at dosages of 3 mg/kg/day in both mice and rats.

Ronald M. Evans's laboratory purchased a sample of GW501516 and gave mice a much higher dose than had been used in GSK's experiments; they found that the compound dramatically increased the physical performance of the mice. The work was published in 2007 in Cell and was widely reported in the popular press including The New York Times and The Wall Street Journal.

Another human study (comparing cardarine with the PPARα agonist GW590735 and placebo) was published in 2021.

== Performance-enhancing drug ==
Concerns were raised prior to the 2008 Beijing Olympics that GW501516 could be used by athletes as a performance-enhancing drug that was not currently controlled by regulations or detected by standard tests. One of the main researchers from the study on enhanced endurance consequently developed a urine test to detect the drug, and made it available to the International Olympic Committee. The World Anti-Doping Agency (WADA) developed a test for GW501516 and other related PPARδ modulators, and added such drugs to the prohibited list in 2009.

GW501516 has been promoted on bodybuilding and athletics websites and by 2011 had already been available for some time on the black market. In 2011, it was reported to cost $1,000 for 10 g. In 2012, WADA recategorised GW501516 from a gene doping compound to a "hormone and metabolic modulator".

In 2013, WADA took the rare step of warning potential users of the compound of the possible health risks, stating that "clinical approval has not, and will not be given for this substance"; the New Scientist attributed the warning to the risks of the drug causing cancer.

A number of athletes have tested positive for GW501516. At the Vuelta Ciclista a Costa Rica in December 2012, four Costa Rican riders tested positive for GW501516. Three of them received two-year suspensions, while the fourth received 12 years as it was his second doping violation. In April 2013, Russian cyclist Valery Kaykov was suspended by cycling's governing body UCI after having tested positive for GW501516. Kaykov's team RusVelo dismissed him immediately and in May 2013, Venezuelan Miguel Ubeto was provisionally suspended by the Lampre team. In February 2014, Russian race walker Elena Lashmanova tested positive for GW501516. In April 2019, American heavyweight boxer Jarrell Miller tested positive for GW501516 which caused his challenge for Anthony Joshua's World Heavyweight titles to be cancelled. In December 2020, Miller was suspended for 2 years for repeated violations. In July 2022, the 2012 800 m Olympic silver medalist from Botswana, Nijel Amos tested positive for GW501516 and was provisionally suspended just days before the 2022 World Athletics Championships. Suriname's Issam Asinga, who set the under-20 world track record in the men's 100 meters, was informed on Aug. 9, 2023 by the Athletics Integrity Unit that his July 18 drug test the prior month detected trace amounts of GW501516. Asinga has alleged in a suit filed in the Southern District of New York that Gatorade provided him with Gatorade Recovery Gummies at their awards ceremony one week earlier in Los Angeles tainted with GW501516.

== Mechanism of action ==
GW501516 is a selective agonist of the PPARδ receptor. It displays high affinity (K_{i} = 1 nM) and potency (EC_{50} = 1 nM) for PPARδ with greater than 1,000-fold selectivity over PPARα and PPARγ.

In rats, binding of GW501516 to PPARδ recruits the coactivator PGC-1α. The PPARδ/coactivator complex in turn upregulates the expression of proteins involved in energy expenditure. Furthermore, in rats treated with GW501516, increased fatty acid metabolism in skeletal muscle and protection against diet-induced obesity and type II diabetes was observed. In obese rhesus monkeys, GW501516 increased high-density lipoprotein (HDL) and lowered very-low-density lipoprotein (VLDL).

Activation of PPARδ is also believed to be the mechanism responsible for cancer induction. A 2018 study found that GW501516 enhanced the growth of colitis-associated colorectal cancer in mice by increasing inflammation and the expression of GLUT1 and SLC1A5.

== See also ==
- Acadesine
- GFT505
- GW0742
- Irisin
- Peroxisome proliferator-activated receptor
- Sodelglitazar
- SR9009
