= Muraglitazar =

Chemical compound

Clinical data
- Other names: 2-[(4-Methoxyphenoxy)carbonyl-[[4-[2-(5-methyl-2-phenyl-1,3-oxazol-4-yl)ethoxy]phenyl]methyl]amino]acetic acid
- ATC code: None

Legal status
- Legal status: Development terminated

Identifiers
- IUPAC name: N-[(4-Methoxyphenoxy)carbonyl]-N-{4-[2-(5-methyl-2-phenyl-1,3-oxazol-4-yl)ethoxy]benzyl}glycine
- CAS Number: 331741-94-7
- PubChem CID: 206044
- ChemSpider: 178524
- UNII: W1MKM70WQI
- KEGG: D05091
- ChEMBL: ChEMBL557580
- CompTox Dashboard (EPA): DTXSID9057719

Chemical and physical data
- Formula: C_{29}H_{28}N_{2}O_{7}
- Molar mass: 516.550 g·mol^{−1}
- 3D model (JSmol): Interactive image
- SMILES: CC1=C(N=C(O1)C2=CC=CC=C2)CCOC3=CC=C(C=C3)CN(CC(=O)O)C(=O)OC4=CC=C(C=C4)OC
- InChI: InChI=1S/C29H28N2O7/c1-20-26(30-28(37-20)22-6-4-3-5-7-22)16-17-36-24-10-8-21(9-11-24)18-31(19-27(32)33)29(34)38-25-14-12-23(35-2)13-15-25/h3-15H,16-19H2,1-2H3,(H,32,33); Key:IRLWJILLXJGJTD-UHFFFAOYSA-N

Muraglitazar (proposed tradename Pargluva) is a dual peroxisome proliferator-activated receptor agonist with affinity to PPARα and PPARγ.

The drug had completed phase III clinical trials, however in May 2006 Bristol-Myers Squibb announced that it had discontinued further development.

Data on muraglitazar is relatively sparse due to the brief introduction and subsequent abandonment of this agent. One double-blind randomized clinical trial comparing muraglitazar and pioglitazone found that the effects of the former were favourable in terms of HDL-C increase, decrease in total cholesterol, apolipoprotein B, triglycerides and a greater reduction in HbA_{1c} (p <0.0001 for all comparisons). However, the muraglitazar group had a higher all-cause mortality, greater incidence of edema and heart failure and more weight gain compared to the pioglitazone group. A meta-analysis of the phase II and III clinical trials of muraglitazar revealed that it was associated with a greater incidence of myocardial infarction, stroke, transient ischemic attacks and congestive heart failure (CHF) when compared to placebo or pioglitazone.
