= Indian Institute of Management Udaipur =

Institution of business management in Udaipur, Rajasthan

- Type: Public business school
- Established: 2011; 15 years ago
- Accreditation: AACSB
- Affiliations: Indian Institutes of Management
- Chairman: Pankaj Patel
- Director: Ashok Banerjee
- Location: Udaipur, Rajasthan, India; 24.500216°N 73.663637°E
- Campus: 300 acres (1.2 km^{2}) proposed; Urban
- Website: www.iimu.ac.in

The Indian Institute of Management Udaipur (IIM Udaipur) is a business school, located in Udaipur, Rajasthan, India. As one of India's premier Indian Institutes of Management, the school has been accorded the status of an Institute of National Importance by the Ministry of Human Resources, Government of India. The school was established as an autonomous body in 2011 and offers a two-year full-time MBA program, one-year full-time postgraduate MBA programs (MBA-GSCM and MBA-DEM), a Doctor of Business Administration program and other management development programs. It is one of the seven Indian Institutes of Management set up by the central government during the Eleventh Five-Year Plan.

The institute has been ranked as one of the top 15 management institutes by the Ministry of Human Resources Development released NIRF rankings in the past three years. The institute is one of nine institutes accredited by AACSB in India. IIMU is also ranked among the top 5 B-schools in India for research based on the methodology used by UT Dallas which tracks publications in 24 leading business journals. The institute is the youngest B-school in the world to be featured in the QS MIM 2020 and FT MIM 2019 rankings. IIM Udaipur and IIM Bangalore only 2 IIMs to be in prestigious Global Rankings consecutively since 2019 • IIM Udaipur continued to be the youngest B-School in Asia in the Global FT MIM Ranking 2022.

== History ==
IIM Udaipur was inaugurated on 30 July 2011 by C. P. Joshi, Minister of Road Transport and Highways. The institute was one of the seven IIMs established by the Indian government. The institute offered its postgraduate program (PGP) to 57 students in its first year, and its postgraduate executive program (PGPX) at a temporary campus located at the Polymer Science Building of the Mohanlal Sukhadia University (MLSU), Udaipur.

Pankaj Patel, the chairman and managing director of Zydus Cadila, was appointed the chairman of the Board of Governors of the institute in January 2016. Patel took over from C. K. Birla, Chairman of Hindustan Motors. Prof. Janat Shah, an IIT Bombay and IIM Ahmedabad alumnus, who was working with IIM Bangalore at that time as a full-time faculty was appointed as the institute's director at its inception.

IIM Udaipur became operational from 2011 in a temporary campus located at Polymer Science Building, Mohanlal Sukhadia University (MLSU), Udaipur, Rajasthan. Construction is completed at the 300-acre land in the Balicha area of Udaipur, Rajasthan, which has been allocated by the Government of Rajasthan for the institute's new Campus. Then honourable Union Minister for HRD, Smriti Irani inaugurated the campus in 2016.

The institute started functioning from the new campus post completion of the first phase in April 2016.

== Campus ==
=== Architecture ===
The campus of IIM Udaipur has been conceptualised and designed by noted architect BV Doshi who is the recipient of the prestigious Pritzker Architecture Prize. He has also designed the campus at IIM Ahmedabad and IIM Bangalore . The IIM Udaipur campus has been constructed on a region surrounding two hillocks, with the student hostels and faculty housing on each with the academic block connecting the two in the valley. The Academic block has lakes being built on both sides and has multiple courtyards which are inspired by the many chowks in Udaipur City. The campus plan for IIM Udaipur has been awarded 5-star rating by GRIHA in 2018.

=== Hostels ===
The hostels consist of clusters of low rise courtyard houses, which have been constructed taking into account the hot climate of the region. Currently single-accommodation facility is provided for students of both the years and those from other courses. All the hostels are centered around the Mess and are connected to a shared open space and a large open-air amphitheatre which is being constructed

=== Faculty and Staff residential facilities ===
Residences for the permanent faculty consist of a series of low-rise single-storey and duplex structures built around private courts and larger shared gardens whereas visiting faculty and staff have been provided with modular apartments.

== Organisation and administration ==
=== Governance ===
Janat Shah, a fellow from IIM Ahmedabad and the former mentor of IIM Bangalore, is the director at IIM Udaipur.

Pankaj Patel, the chairman managing director of Zydus Cadila is the chairman of the Board of Governors of the institute. Some of the other notable board members include Cricket commentator Harsha Bhogle; Shiv Shivkumar, Group Executive President of Corporate Strategy & Business Development, Aditya Birla Management Corporation Pvt. Ltd; Ms Mythily Ramesh, co-founder and CEO, NextWealth; Mr Nirmal Jain, Chairman of the Board & Founder, IIFL Holdings Limited; Mr Pranay Chulet, Founder & CEO, Quikr; Mr Satyanarayan B. Dangayach, Former Managing Director, Sintex Industries Limited; Mr Suresh Naik Ramavath, Ms Vidya Shah, Senior Executive Vice President, Edelweiss Financial Services Limited.

== Academics ==
Since 2018, IIM Udaipur offers MBA degrees, the second IIM in the country to do so, following IIM Bangalore. The courses offered are, the regular two-year full-time residential program (MBA) and two one-year full-time residential MBA programs (MBA-GSCM and MBA-DEM). The institute also offers a doctoral-level PhD program, which usually has a duration of 4.5 to 5 years. IIM Udaipur's courses are accredited by AACSB.

=== Admissions ===
The admissions to the flagship two-year MBA Program is done through the Common Admissions Test (CAT) followed by another level of screening process consisting of written tests and interviews. The interviews approximately take place during the month of February and March every year. The admissions for the one year MBA programs are done through Graduate Management Admissions Test (GMAT) or GRE and interviews for the shortlisted candidates. The admissions process for the one year MBA programs takes place from September to February every year.

=== Student Exchange Programs ===
The institution has links with nine institutes across the world including EDHEC Business School, ESEG School of Management, KEDGE Business School, Ecole de Management Normandie in France; FAU Erlangen-Nurnberg, HHL Leipzig, EBS Oestrich-Winkel, WHU - Otto Beisheim School of Management in Germany and Purdue University in United States. Students who go to HHL Leipzig -Germany, EBS Oestrich-Winkel-Germany and WHU - Otto Beisheim School of Management can apply for DAAD for the scholarship. Students of the two-year MBA program go on their exchange program during the 5th term of the course. The students of the GSCM MBA program have an option to spend one semester at Purdue University, USA.

=== Ranking ===
University rankings

Business – international
- QS (MBA) (2023): 151-200
- Financial Times (MBA) (2022): 81

Business/Management – India
- NIRF (2023): 16

IIMU was ranked 16 in India by the National Institutional Ranking Framework (NIRF) management school ranking in 2023. It was ranked 8 in India by Outlook Magazine in 2020. It is ranked 72nd (4th in India) in the Financial Times Global Ranking for Management, and is the youngest Indian B-School to be featured in the global rankings. It also features amongst the 6 Institutes based out of India to feature in QS Global Ranking for Management. Its MBA program is now in the 101+ category among the global 129 programmes from 28 countries. The institute is ranked 11th in India by MBA universe 2022 B school ranking.

=== Publications ===
In December 2019, the Institute launched the first edition of the biannual 'Business Review' magazine.

Since 2017, the institute in collaboration with Futurescope releases its annual 'Responsible Business Ranking' report.

== Student life ==
The IIM Udaipur Community is known to be a highly student-driven community. There are many student-run clubs and societies at IIM Udaipur. All the major events held on the campus are managed by the students themselves. The Council of Student Affairs (CSA) is an elected body which acts as the apex body of the student community

=== Student campus organisations ===
The clubs are divided into professional clubs and social clubs, while committees like the Placement Committee and the Media and Industry Interaction Cell (MiiC) handle external relations. Professional clubs include the consulting club 'Consult-U', the HR club 'dHRuva', the finance club 'Finomina', the marketing club 'MarClan', the economics club 'PiE', the Entrepreneurship club 'Saksham', the SCM and operations club 'Skein' and the Analytics and IT Club 'Technalytics'. Social clubs include Code Red, the photography club 'IRIS', the literary club 'Potpourri', the social responsibility club 'Prayatna', the Toastmasters chapter 'Silvertongues', the dance club 'FootworX', the music society 'Octaves', the art community 'CreArT', the Bikers and Trekkers Club 'B.A.T' and the 'Public Policy Group' for policy enthusiasts.

=== Events ===
==== Solaris ====
Solaris is the annual Management festival of the institute. It is a two-day festival consisting of summits from multiple areas of Management like Finance, Economics, Operations and Analytics. The Leadership Summit is the flagship event of Solaris. Lieutenant General Satish Dua, PVSM, UYSM, SM, VSM; Piyush Pandey, Co-Executive Chairman, Ogilvy and Mather and Subir Gokarn, Deputy Governor, RBI and Executive Director, IMF are some of the notable luminaries who have spoken at Solaris.

The theme for the 5th edition of Solaris held in October 2019 was 'Success with Synergy'.

==== Audacity ====
Audacity is the annual cultural festival of IIM Udaipur. It is a two-day event which comprises multiple fun events, competitions and shows by celebrities. The theme for sixth edition i.e. Audacity 2020 was 'Escape Reality'. Guru Randhawa and Rahul Subramanian were the notable celebrities who performed in Audacity 2020.

==== Utkrisht ====
Utkrisht is the annual Sports festival of the Institute which is organised in January. Utkrisht '19 was the second year of the festival and saw the participation of multiple colleges for the plethora of sports events organised on the campus. The third edition of the annual marathon 'Udaipur Runs' was also organised with the theme 'Run with the Jawans'.

==== Netratva - The leadership talk series ====
The Institute regularly organises guest lectures by notable leaders from the business world under the Netratva series. Harish Bhat, Brand Custodian, Tata Group; Suresh Narayanan, CMD, Nestle India are some of the notable speakers who have delivered their talks as a part of this series.

==== Other events and summits ====
Apart from the above events, IIM Udaipur organises multiple other events and summits throughout the year like Udaipur Litfest, 'Analytica', the Analytics summit; 'Spandan', the annual HR Summit and 'Prarambh', the B-plan competition event.

=== Notable faculty ===
- Elizabeth Rose
