= Tesaglitazar =

Chemical compound

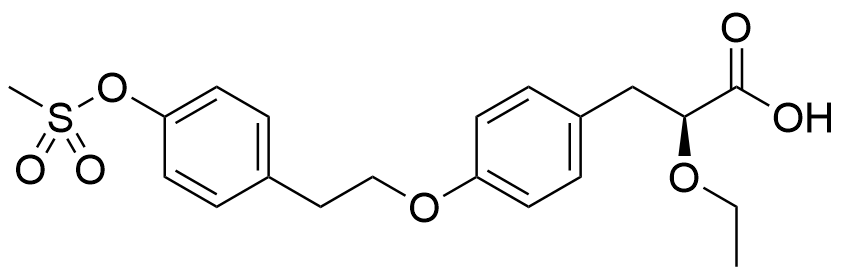

Clinical data
- ATC code: None

Legal status
- Legal status: Development terminated

Identifiers
- IUPAC name: (2S)-2-Ethoxy-3-[4-[2-(4-methylsulfonyloxyphenyl) ethoxy]phenyl]propanoic acid
- CAS Number: 251565-85-2
- PubChem CID: 208901
- ChemSpider: 180999
- UNII: 6734037O3L
- KEGG: D01274
- ChEMBL: ChEMBL521632
- CompTox Dashboard (EPA): DTXSID4048773
- ECHA InfoCard: 100.201.079

Chemical and physical data
- Formula: C_{20}H_{24}O_{6}S
- Molar mass: 392.47 g·mol^{−1}
- 3D model (JSmol): Interactive image
- SMILES: CCO[C@@H](CC1=CC=C(C=C1)OCCC2=CC=C(C=C2)OS(=O)(=O)C)C(=O)O
- InChI: InChI=1S/C20H24O6S/c1-3-25-19(20(21)22)14-16-6-8-17(9-7-16)26-13-12-15-4-10-18(11-5-15)27-28(2,23)24/h4-11,19H,3,12-14H2,1-2H3,(H,21,22)/t19-/m0/s1; Key:CXGTZJYQWSUFET-IBGZPJMESA-N

Tesaglitazar (also known as AZ 242) is a dual peroxisome proliferator-activated receptor agonist with affinity to PPARα and PPARγ, proposed for the management of type 2 diabetes.

The drug had completed several phase III clinical trials, however in May, 2006 AstraZeneca announced that it had discontinued further development.

Cardiac toxicity of tesaglitazar is related to mitochondrial toxicity caused by decrease in PPARγ coactivator 1-α (PPARGC1A, PGC1α) and sirtuin 1 (SIRT1).
