= Alpha agonist =

Alpha agonist may refer to:

- Alpha-adrenergic agonist, drugs that selectively stimulate alpha adrenergic receptors
- PPAR-alpha agonist, drugs which act upon the peroxisome proliferator-activated receptor alpha
