= Elizabeth Rose =

Elizabeth Rose may refer to:

- Elizabeth Rose (nun), 12th-century nun
- Elizabeth Rose, Lady of Kilravock (1747–1815), Scottish literary critic and author
- Elizabeth Rose (musician), Australian DJ, producer and singer-songwriter
- Elizabeth Rose (academic), professor in business policy and strategy
- Elizabeth Rose, a character in the film Along Came a Spider
- Elizabeth Rose, a DC Comics character nicknamed Betsy Ross
- Liz Rose, songwriter
