= Gas station weed =

Gas station weed is any of several plant-derived preparations sold over-the-counter at gas stations, convenience stores, vape shops, etc., in some countries. The term may refer to:

- Kratom (Mitragyna speciosa) preparations
- Various cannabinoid preparations
  - See also cannabis (drug)

== See also ==
- Gas station heroin
