= Cadila Pharmaceuticals =

Indian pharmaceutical company

Cadila Pharmaceuticals Limited

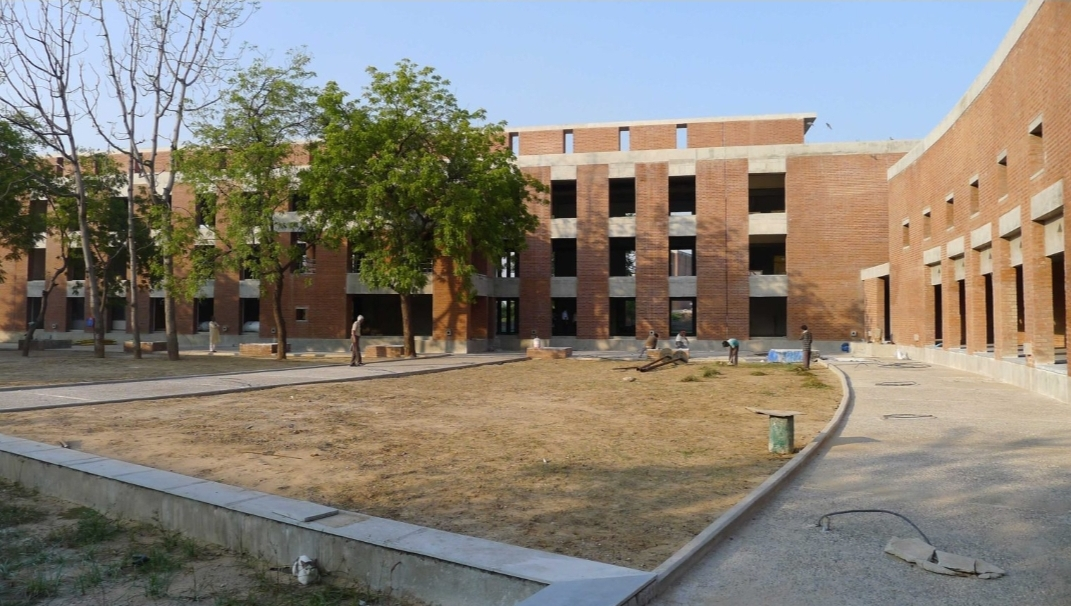
- Headquarters in Ahmedabad
- Type: Private
- Industry: Pharmaceuticals
- Founded: 1951
- Founder: Indravadan Modi
- Headquarters: Ahmedabad, Gujarat, India
- Key people: Rajiv Modi (Chairman and Managing Director)
- Products: APIs, generic drugs
- Services: Contract research; Contract manufacturing
- Revenue: ▲₹3,675 crore (US$380 million) (FY23)
- Net income: ▼₹−10 crore (US$−1.0 million) (FY23)
- Number of employees: 8,000
- Subsidiaries: IRM Ltd
- Website: www.cadilapharma.com

Cadila Pharmaceuticals is an Indian multinational pharmaceutical company based in Ahmedabad. The company's operations focus on manufacturing products ranging from active pharmaceutical intermediates, finished formulations, food supplements, biotechnology products and pharmaceutical machinery.

== History ==
In 1951 Indravadan A Modi had quit his job as a chemist in a Mumbai firm to start Cadila Laboratories with childhood friend Ramanbhai Patel. The company started in a rented bungalow with a capital of Rs 25,000 and achieved a turnover of around Rs 1.25 lakh in its first year of operation.

The Modi and Patel families decided to split the business in 1995, and two entities were formed: Cadila Pharmaceuticals Ltd (owned and controlled by Indravadan Modi and his son Rajiv Modi) and Cadila Healthcare (owned by Ramanbhai Patel and his son Pankaj Patel family).

In 2019, Cadila Pharmaceuticals formed a partnership with Norwegian start-up, Serca Pharmaceuticals to develop new treatment for heart patients.

In November 2023, the company opened an active pharmaceutical ingredient (API) plant in Dahej, in Gujarat's Bharuch district. The facility was built with an investment of ₹200 crore, and is equipped with distributed control system (DCS) automation technology.

== Operations ==
Cadila Pharmaceuticals has its formulation manufacturing facilities at Dholka, Gujarat (India); Samba, Jammu (India) and at Addis Ababa (Ethiopia) and 2 API manufacturing facilities are located at Ankleshwar, Gujarat. The manufacturing facility at Dholka and the API unit at Ankleshwar in Gujarat are USFDA-certified; the overseas manufacturing facility at Ethiopia is the WHO - cGMP compliant facility.

== Controversies ==
=== Company ===
In 2014, a cautionary notice appeared on the US Food and Drug Administration (FDA) website, highlighting substantial manufacturing practice discrepancies discovered by inspectors in March at Cadila Pharmaceuticals' Ankleshwar facility in Gujarat. This incident marked one among several Indian pharmaceutical companies receiving regulatory warnings from the FDA, indicating increased scrutiny on generic drugmakers. A similar kind of notices were again issued in 2016 and 2019.

=== Management ===
In 2018, the chairman of the company, Rajiv Modi, went through a widely publicized and contentious divorce with his wife, Monica, who comes from a prominent Mumbai-based business family of Garware. At that time, Modi transferred ₹200 crore (equivalent to ₹218 crore or US$23 million in 2026) to Monica, who relinquished her rights, while custody of their son was awarded to Modi.
