= Tianeptine =

Atypical antidepressant

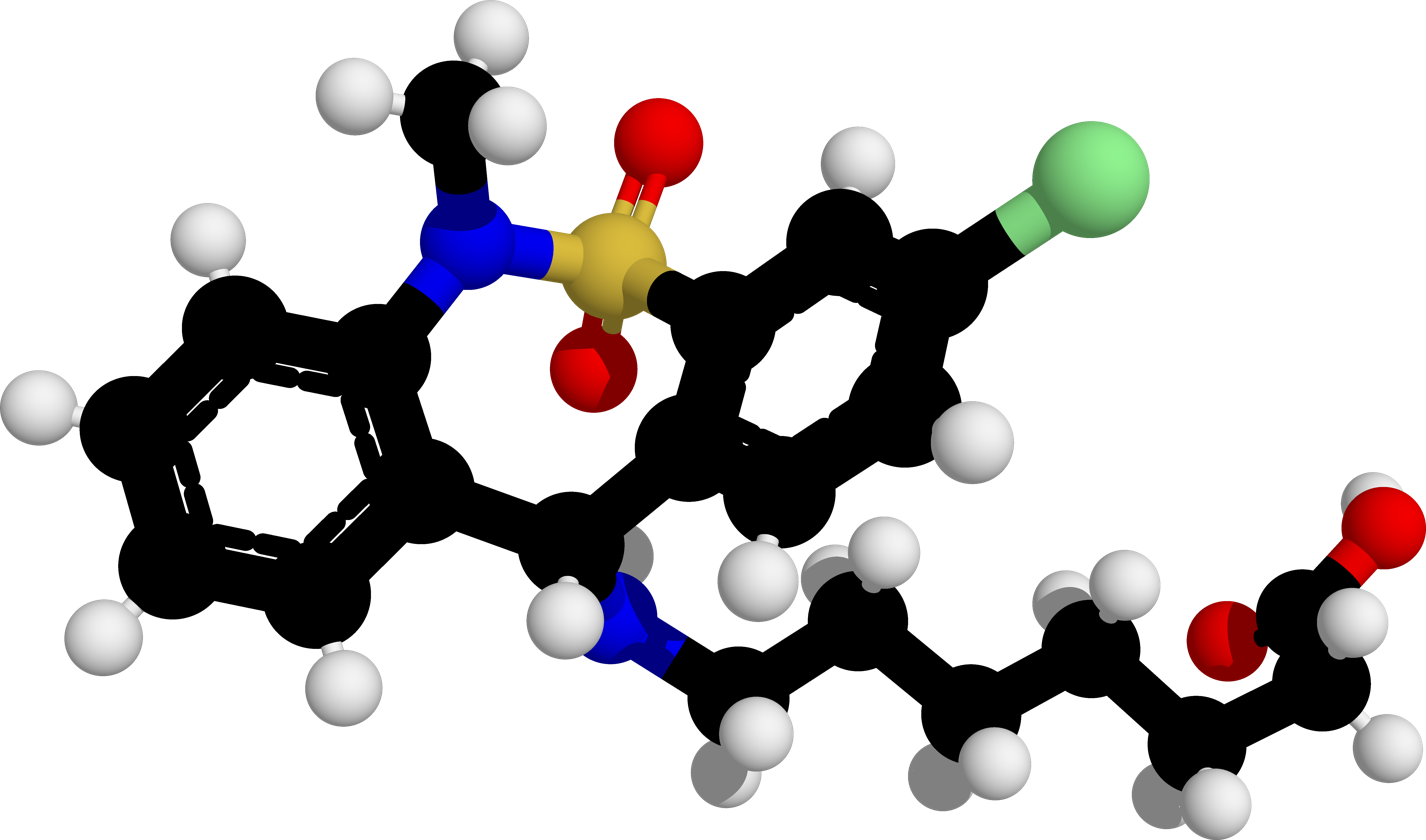

Clinical data
- Trade names: Stablon, Coaxil, Tatinol
- Other names: Tia; ZaZa; S-1574; JNJ-39823277; TPI-1062
- AHFS/Drugs.com: International Drug Names
- Routes of administration: Oral
- Drug class: Tricyclic antidepressant; Antidepressant; Anxiolytic; Anti-inflammatory drug; Opioid; PPAR agonist
- ATC code: N06AX14 (WHO)

Legal status
- Legal status: BR: Class C1 (Other controlled substances); In general: Rx-only US: Investigational New Drug AU: S4 Others: controlled in FR, IT, BH, SG

Pharmacokinetic data
- Bioavailability: 99%
- Protein binding: 95%
- Metabolism: Hepatic by β-oxidation
- Elimination half-life: 2.5–3 hours 4–9 hours (elderly)
- Excretion: Urine: 65% Feces: 15%

Identifiers
- IUPAC name: 7-[(3-chloro-6-methyl-5,5-dioxo-11H-benzo[c][2,1]benzothiazepin-11-yl)amino]heptanoic acid
- CAS Number: 72797-41-2 30123-17-2 (sodium) 1224690-84-9 (sulfate) 2231739-19-6 (hemioxalate)
- PubChem CID: 68870
- IUPHAR/BPS: 7558
- ChemSpider: 62102
- UNII: 0T493YFU8O
- KEGG: D02575
- ChEBI: CHEBI:91749
- ChEMBL: ChEMBL1289110
- CompTox Dashboard (EPA): DTXSID7048295
- ECHA InfoCard: 100.131.750 100.069.844, 100.131.750

Chemical and physical data
- Formula: C_{21}H_{25}ClN_{2}O_{4}S
- Molar mass: 436.95 g·mol^{−1}
- 3D model (JSmol): Interactive image
- SMILES: Clc1cc2c(cc1)C(c3c(N(C)S2(=O)=O)cccc3)NCCCCCCC(=O)O
- InChI: InChI=1S/C21H24ClN2NaO4S/c1-24-18-9-6-5-8-16(18)21(23-13-7-3-2-4-10-20(25)26)17-12-11-15(22)14-19(17)29(24,27)28/h5-6,8-9,11-12,14,21,23H,2-4,7,10,13H2,1H3,(H,25,26); Key:JICJBGPOMZQUBB-UHFFFAOYSA-N

Tianeptine, sold under the brand names Stablon, Tatinol, and Coaxil among others, is an atypical tricyclic antidepressant which is used mainly in the treatment of major depressive disorder, although it may also be used to treat anxiety, asthma, and irritable bowel syndrome.

Tianeptine has antidepressant and anxiolytic effects with a relative lack of sedative, anticholinergic, and cardiovascular side effects. It has been found to act as an atypical agonist of the μ-opioid receptor with clinically negligible effects on the δ- and κ-opioid receptors. This may explain part of its antidepressant and anxiolytic effects; however, it is thought that tianeptine also modulates glutamate receptors, and this may also explain tianeptine's antidepressant/anxiolytic effects.

Tianeptine was discovered and patented by the French Society of Medical Research in the 1960s. It was introduced for medical use in France in 1983. Currently, tianeptine is approved in France and manufactured and marketed by Laboratories Servier SA; it is also marketed in a number of other European countries under the trade name Coaxil as well as in Asia (including Singapore) and Latin America as Stablon and Tatinol but it is not available in Australia, Canada, New Zealand, Italy or the United Kingdom. In the United States, it is an unregulated drug sold under several names and some of these products have been found to be adulterated with other recreational drugs. It is commonly known by the nickname "gas station heroin". In July 2026, the United States Drug Enforcement Administration (DEA) announced its intention to make tianeptine a Schedule I controlled substance.

== Medical uses ==
=== Depression and anxiety ===
Tianeptine shows efficacy against serious depressive episodes (major depression), comparable to amitriptyline, imipramine and fluoxetine, but with significantly fewer side effects. It was shown to be more effective than maprotiline in a group of people with co-existing depression and anxiety. Tianeptine also displays significant anxiolytic properties and is useful in treating a spectrum of anxiety disorders including panic disorder, as evidenced by a study in which those administered 35% CO_{2} gas (carbogen) on paroxetine or tianeptine therapy showed equivalent panic-blocking effects. Like many antidepressants (including others Tricyclic antidepressant like Nortriptyline and Amitriptyline, Tetracyclic antidepressant, bupropion, selective serotonin reuptake inhibitors, serotonin-norepinephrine reuptake inhibitors, Monoamine oxidase inhibitor among others) it may also have a beneficial effect on cognition in people with depression-induced cognitive dysfunction. , especially in elderly patients A 2005 study in Egypt showed tianeptine to be effective in men with depression and erectile dysfunction.

Tianeptine has been found to be effective in depression, in people with Parkinson's disease, and with post-traumatic stress disorder for which it was as safe and effective as fluoxetine and moclobemide.

=== Other uses ===
A clinical trial comparing its efficacy and tolerability with amitriptyline in the treatment of irritable bowel syndrome showed that tianeptine was at least as effective as amitriptyline and produced fewer prominent adverse effects, such as dry mouth and constipation.

Tianeptine has been reported to be very effective for asthma. In August 1998, Dr. Fuad Lechin and colleagues at the Central University of Venezuela Institute of Experimental Medicine in Caracas published the results of a 52-week randomized controlled trial of asthmatic children; the children in the groups who received tianeptine had a sharp decrease in clinical rating and increased lung function. Two years earlier, they had found a close, positive association between free serotonin in plasma and severity of asthma in symptomatic persons. As tianeptine was the only agent known to both reduce free serotonin in plasma and enhance uptake in platelets, they decided to use it to see if reducing free serotonin levels in plasma would help. By November 2004, there had been two double-blind placebo-controlled crossover trials and an under-25,000 person open-label study lasting over seven years, both showing effectiveness.

Tianeptine also has anticonvulsant and analgesic effects, and a clinical trial in Spain that ended in January 2007 has shown that tianeptine is effective in treating pain due to fibromyalgia. Tianeptine has been shown to have efficacy with minimal side effects in the treatment of attention-deficit hyperactivity disorder.

== Contraindications ==
Known contraindications include the following:

- Hypersensitivity to tianeptine or any of the tablet's excipients.

== Side effects ==
Compared to other tricyclic antidepressants, it produces significantly fewer cardiovascular, anticholinergic (like dry mouth or constipation), sedative and appetite-stimulating effects. Unlike other tricyclic antidepressants, tianeptine does not affect heart function.

μ-Opioid receptor agonists (Opioid) can sometimes induce euphoria, as does tianeptine, occasionally, at high doses, well above the normal therapeutic range (see § Recreational use below) which makes them prone for abuse. As such, it is not recommended to use Tianeptine for patients with history of any substance abuse, especially in opioid use disorders. Tianeptine can also cause severe withdrawal symptoms after prolonged use at high doses which should prompt extreme caution when stopping treatment.

=== By frequency ===
Common (>1% frequency)

- Headache (up to 18%)
- Dizziness (up to 10%)
- Insomnia/nightmares (up to 20%)
- Drowsiness (up to 10%)
- Dry mouth (up to 20%)
- Constipation (up to 15%)
- Nausea
- Abdominal pain
- Weight gain (~3%)
- Agitation
- Anxiety/irritability

Uncommon (0.1–1% frequency)

- Bitter taste
- Flatulence
- Gastralgia
- Blurred vision
- Muscle aches
- Premature ventricular contractions
- Micturition disturbances
- Palpitations
- Orthostatic hypotension
- Hot flushes
- Tremor

Rare (<0.1% frequency)

- Hepatitis
- Hypomania
- Euphoria
- ECG changes
- Pruritus/allergic-type skin reactions
- Protracted muscle aches
- General fatigue

== Pharmacology ==
=== Pharmacodynamics ===
Tianeptine
Site	K_{i} (nM)	Species	Ref
MOR	383–768 (K_{i}); 194 (EC_{50})	Human	
DOR	10000+ (K_{i}); 37400 (EC_{50})	Human	
KOR	10000+ (K_{i}); 100000+ (EC_{50})	Human	
SERT	10000+	Human	
NET	10000+	Human	
DAT	10000+	Human	
5-HT_{1A}	10000+	Human	
5-HT_{1B}	10000+	Human	
5-HT_{1D}	10000+	Human	
5-HT_{1E}	10000+	Human	
5-HT_{2A}	10000+	Human	
5-HT_{2B}	10000+	Human	
5-HT_{2C}	10000+	Human	
5-HT_{3}	10000+	Human	
5-HT_{5A}	10000+	Human	
5-HT_{6}	10000+	Human	
5-HT_{7}	10000+	Human	
α_{1A}	10000+	Human	
α_{1B}	10000+	Human	
α_{2A}	10000+	Human	
α_{2B}	10000+	Human	
α_{2C}	10000+	Human	
β_{1}	10000+	Human	
β_{2}	10000+	Human	
D_{1}	10000+	Human	
D_{2}	10000+	Human	
D_{3}	10000+	Human	
D_{4}	10000+	Human	
D_{5}	10000+	Human	
H_{1}	10000+	Human	
H_{2}	10000+	Human	
H_{3}	10000+	Human	
H_{4}	10000+	Human	
mACh	10000+	Human	
σ_{1}	10000+	Guinea pig	
σ_{2}	10000+	Rat	
I_{1}	10000+	Human	
A_{1}	10000+ (EC_{50})	Human	
VDCC	10000+	Human	
Values are K_{i} (nM), unless otherwise noted. The smaller the value, the more strongly the drug interacts with the site.

==== Atypical μ-opioid receptor agonist ====
In 2014, tianeptine was found to be a μ-opioid receptor (MOR) full agonist using human proteins. It was also found to act as a full agonist of the δ-opioid receptor (DOR), although with approximately 200-fold lower potency. The same researchers subsequently found that the MOR is required for the acute and chronic antidepressant-like behavioral effects of tianeptine in mice and that its primary metabolite had similar activity as a MOR agonist but with a much longer elimination half-life. Moreover, in mice, although tianeptine produced other opioid-like behavioral effects such as analgesia and reward, it did not result in tolerance or withdrawal. The authors suggested that tianeptine may be acting as a biased agonist of the MOR and that this may be responsible for its atypical profile as a MOR agonist. However, there are reports that suggest that withdrawal effects resembling those of other typical opioid drugs (including but not limited to depression, insomnia, and cold/flu-like symptoms) do manifest following prolonged use at dosages far beyond the medical range. In addition to its therapeutic effects, activation of the MOR is likely to also be responsible for the abuse potential of tianeptine at high doses that are well above the normal therapeutic range and efficacy threshold.

In rats, when co-administered with morphine, tianeptine prevents morphine-induced respiratory depression without impairing analgesia. In humans, however, tianeptine was found to increase respiratory depression when administered in conjunction with the potent opioid remifentanil.

==== Glutamatergic, neurotrophic, and neuroplastic modulation ====
Research suggests that tianeptine produces its antidepressant effects through indirect alteration and inhibition of glutamate receptor activity (i.e., AMPA receptors and NMDA receptors) and release of BDNF, in turn affecting neural plasticity. Some researchers hypothesize that tianeptine has a protective effect against stress induced neuronal remodeling. There is also action on the NMDA and AMPA receptors. In animal models, tianeptine inhibits the pathological stress-induced changes in glutamatergic neurotransmission in the amygdala and hippocampus. It may also facilitate signal transduction at the CA3 commissural associational synapse by altering the phosphorylation state of glutamate receptors. With the discovery of the rapid and novel antidepressant effects of drugs such as ketamine, many believe the efficacy of antidepressants is related to promotion of synaptic plasticity. This may be achieved by regulating the excitatory amino acid systems that are responsible for changes in the strength of synaptic connections as well as enhancing BDNF expression, although these findings are based largely on preclinical studies.

==== Serotonin reuptake enhancer ====
Tianeptine is no longer labelled a selective serotonin reuptake enhancer (SSRE) antidepressant. Tianeptine had been found to bind to the same allosteric site on the serotonin transporter (SERT) as conventional TCAs. However, whereas conventional TCAs inhibit serotonin reuptake by the SERT, tianeptine appeared to enhance it. This seems to be because of the unique C3 amino heptanoic acid side chain of tianeptine, which, in contrast to other TCAs, is thought to lock the SERT in a conformation that increases affinity for and reuptake (V_{max}) of serotonin. As such, tianeptine was thought to act a positive allosteric modulator of the SERT, or as a "serotonin reuptake enhancer".

Although tianeptine was originally found to have no effect in vitro on monoamine reuptake, release, or receptor binding, upon acute and repeated administration, tianeptine decreased the extracellular levels of serotonin in rat brain without a decrease in serotonin release, leading to a theory of tianeptine enhancing serotonin reuptake. The (−)-enantiomer is more active in this sense than the (+)-enantiomer. However, more recent studies found that long-term administration of tianeptine does not elicit any marked alterations (neither increases nor decreases) in extracellular levels of serotonin in rats. However, coadministration of tianeptine and the selective serotonin reuptake inhibitor fluoxetine inhibited the effect of tianeptine on long-term potentiation in hippocampal CA1 area. This is considered an argument for the opposite effects of tianeptine and fluoxetine on serotonin uptake, although it has been shown that fluoxetine can be partially substituted for tianeptine in animal studies. In any case, the collective research suggests that direct modulation of the serotonin system is unlikely to be the mechanism of action underlying the antidepressant effects of tianeptine.

==== Other actions ====
Tianeptine modestly enhances the mesolimbic release of dopamine and potentiates CNS D_{2} and D_{3} receptors. Tianeptine has no affinity for the dopamine transporter or the dopamine receptors. CREB-TF (CREB, cAMP response element-binding protein) is a cellular transcription factor. It binds to certain DNA sequences called cAMP response elements (CRE), thereby increasing or decreasing the transcription of the genes. CREB has a well-documented role in neuronal plasticity and long-term memory formation in the brain. Cocaine- and amphetamine-regulated transcript, also known as CART, is a neuropeptide protein that in humans is encoded by the CARTPT gene. CART appears to have roles in reward, feeding, stress, and it has the functional properties of an endogenous psychostimulant. Taking into account that CART production is upregulated by CREB, it could be hypothesized that due to tianeptine's central role in BDNF and neuronal plasticity, this CREB may be the transcription cascade through which this drug enhances mesolimbic release of dopamine.

Research indicates possible anticonvulsant (anti-seizure) and analgesic (painkilling) activity of tianeptine via downstream modulation of adenosine A_{1} receptors (as the effects could be experimentally blocked by antagonists of this receptor). Tianpetine is also weak histone deacetylase (HDAC) inhibitor, specifically of HDAC1 and HDAC2 but not of HDAC3, and analogues with greatly increased potency such as tianeptinaline have been developed.

Tianeptine has been identified as an agonist of the nuclear PPARβ/δ and PPARγ receptors. Its PPARβ/δ activity appears to be attributable to (S)-Tianeptine (estianeptine), while both the (S)- and (R)- enantiomers are active at PPARγ.

=== Pharmacokinetics ===
The bioavailability of tianeptine is approximately 99%. Its plasma protein binding is about 95%. The metabolism of tianeptine is hepatic, via β-oxidation. CYP enzymes are not involved, which limits the potential for drug-drug interactions. Maximal concentration is reached in about an hour and the elimination half-life is 2.5 to 3 hours. The elimination half-life has been found to be increased to 4 to 9 hours in the elderly. Tianeptine is usually packaged as a sodium salt but can also be found as tianeptine sulfate, a slower-releasing formulation patented by Janssen in 2012. In 2022 Tonix Pharmaceuticals received permission from the US FDA to conduct phase II clinical trials on tianeptine hemioxalate extended-release tablets designed for once-daily use. The project was discontinued in late 2023 because of disappointing results in clinical trials.

Tianeptine has two active metabolites, MC5 (a pentanoic acid derivative of the parent compound) and MC3 (a propionic acid derivative). MC5 has a longer elimination half-life of approximately 7.6 hours, and takes about a week to reach steady-state concentration under daily-dosing. MC5 is a mu-opioid agonist but not delta-opioid agonist, with EC50 at the mu-opioid receptor of 0.545 μM (vs 0.194 μM for tianeptine). MC3 is a very weak mu-opioid agonist, with an EC50 of 16 μM. Tianeptine is excreted 65% in the urine and 15% in feces.

== Chemistry ==
In terms of chemical structure, tianeptine is similar to tricyclic antidepressants (TCAs), but it has significantly different pharmacology and important structural differences, so it is not usually grouped with them.

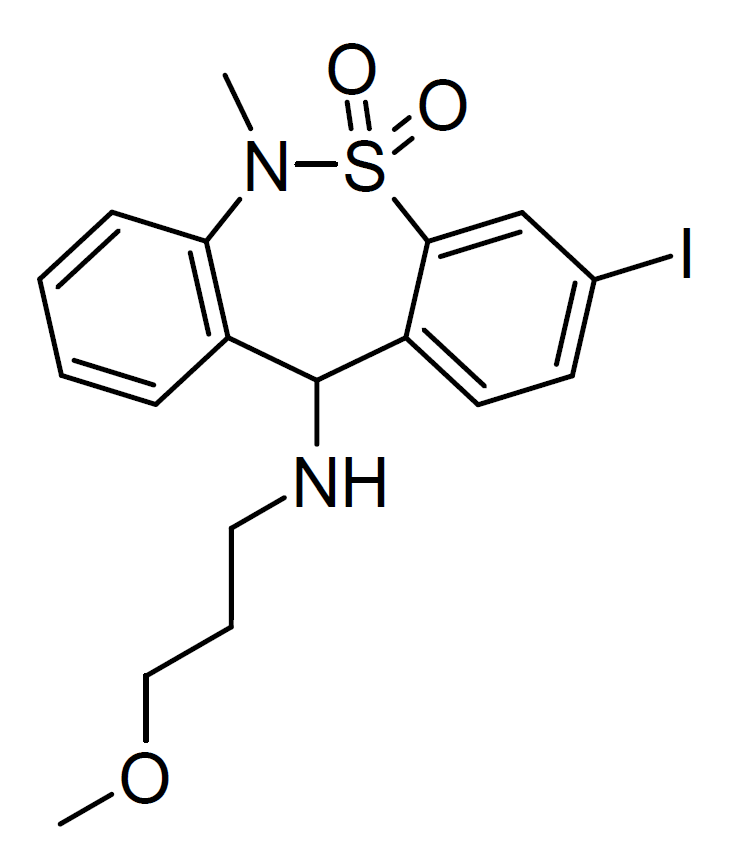
Tianeptine analogue 8u, PMID 126712998

=== Enantiomers ===
Tianeptine is a racemic mixture of (R)- and (S)- enantiomers. The (S)- enantiomer is known as estianeptine. (R)-Tianeptine is a weak μ-opioid receptor agonist, while estianeptine is a peroxisome proliferator-activated receptor (PPAR) agonist.

=== Analogues ===
Although several related compounds are disclosed in the original patent, no activity data are provided and it was unclear whether these share tianeptine's unique pharmacological effects. More recent structure-activity relationship studies have since been conducted, providing some further insight on μ-opioid, δ-opioid, and pharmacokinetic activity. Derivatives where the aromatic chlorine substituent is replaced by bromine, iodine or methylthio, and/or the heptanoic acid tail is varied in length or replaced with other groups such as 3-methoxypropyl, show similar or increased opioid receptor activity relative to tianeptine, with up to 13x higher potency than tianeptine itself. Amineptine, the most closely related drug to have been widely studied, is a dopamine reuptake inhibitor with no significant effect on serotonin levels, nor opioid agonist activity. Tianeptinaline and tianeptinostat, analogues of tianeptine, are potent histone deacetylase (HDAC) inhibitors.

== History ==
Tianeptine was introduced for medical use in France under the brand name Stablon in 1983.

== Society and culture ==
Stablon box and blister pack.

=== Approval and brand names ===
Brand names include:

- Coaxil (BG, CR, CZ, EE, HU, LT, LV, PL, RO, RU, SK UA)
- Salymbra (EE)
- Stablon (AR, AT, BR, FR, HK, IN, ID, MY, MX, PK, PT, SG, SK, TH, TT, TR, VE)
- Tatinol (CN)
- Tianeurax (DE)
- Tynept (IN)
- Zinosal (ES)
- Tianesal (PL)

=== Development ===
Under the code names JNJ-39823277 and TPI-1062, tianeptine was previously under development for the treatment of major depressive disorder in the United States and Belgium. Phase I clinical trials were completed in Belgium and the United States in May and June 2009, respectively. For unclear reasons development of tianeptine was discontinued in both countries in January 2012. In October 2023, Tonix Pharmaceuticals announced that it had discontinued its development of tianeptine as a monotherapy for major depressive disorder after disappointing phase-2 clinical trial results. An ongoing clinical trial, sponsored by the New York Psychiatric Institute, is examining tianeptine's use in treatment-resistant depression.

U.S. National Poison Data System data on tianeptine showed a nationwide increase in tianeptine exposure calls and calls related to abuse and misuse during 2014–2017.

=== Recreational use ===
As a μ-opioid agonist, tianeptine in large doses has high abuse potential. In 2001, Singapore's Ministry of Health restricted tianeptine prescribing to psychiatrists due to its recreational potential.

Between 1989 and 2004, in France 141 cases of recreational use were identified, correlating to an incidence of 1 to 3 cases per 1000 persons treated with tianeptine and 45 between 2006 and 2011. According to Servier, stopping of treatment with tianeptine is difficult, due to the possibility of withdrawal symptoms. The severity of the withdrawal is dependent on the daily dose, with high doses being extremely difficult to quit. An official DEA statement states that the withdrawal symptoms in humans typically result in: agitation, nausea, vomiting, tachycardia, hypertension, diarrhea, tremor, and diaphoresis, similar to other opioid drugs.

In 2007, according to French Health Products Safety Agency, tianeptine's manufacturer Servier agreed to modify the drug's label, following problems with dependency.

Tianeptine has been intravenously injected by drug users in Russia. This method of administration reportedly causes an opioid-like effect and is sometimes used in an attempt to lessen opioid withdrawal symptoms. Tianeptine tablets contain silica and do not dissolve completely. Often the solution is not filtered well thus particles in the injected fluid block capillaries, leading to thrombosis and then severe necrosis. Thus, in Russia tianeptine (sold under the brand name "Coaxil") is a schedule III controlled substance in the same list as the majority of benzodiazepines and barbiturates.

The Centers for Disease Control and Prevention (CDC) has expressed concern that tianeptine may be an "emerging public health risk", citing an increase in exposure-related calls to poison control centers in the United States. Sold retail as a dietary supplement and touted as a mood-booster and an aid for concentration, it is colloquially known as "gas-station heroin". In the United States, it is an unregulated drug sold under several product names and has been found to be adulterated with synthetic cannabinoid receptor agonists (SCRAs) or other drugs.

A literature review conducted in 2018 found 25 articles involving 65 patients with tianeptine abuse or dependence. Limited data showed that a majority of patients were male and that age ranged from 19 to 67. Routes of intake included oral, intravenous, and insufflation entry. In the 15 cases of overdose, 8 combined ingestion with at least one other substance, of which 3 resulted in death. Six additional deaths are reported involving tianeptine (making 9 in total). In this report, the amount of tianeptine used ranged from 50 mg/day to 10 g/day orally.

=== Legal status ===
In 2003, Bahrain classified tianeptine a controlled substance due to increasing reports of misuse and recreational use.

In Russia, tianeptine (sold under the brand name "Coaxil") is a schedule III controlled substance in the same list as the majority of benzodiazepines and barbiturates.

On 13 March 2020, with a decree approved by the Minister of Health, Italy became the first European country to outlaw tianeptine considering it a Class I controlled substance.

==== United States ====
In the United States, tianeptine is not considered by the Drug Enforcement Administration as a controlled substance or analogue thereof. However, its use in dietary supplements and food is unlawful. The Food and Drug Administration (FDA) has issued warnings, as recently as January 2024, about the dangers of recreational tianeptine use and the risks posed by adulterated dietary supplements containing undeclared tianeptine.

On 6 April 2018, Michigan became the first US state to outlaw tianeptine sodium, classifying it as a schedule II controlled substance. The scheduling of tianeptine sodium is effective 4 July 2018.

On 1 November 2019, Tianeptine became a Schedule II controlled dangerous substance as classified within the Uniform Controlled Dangerous Substances Act of the state of Oklahoma.

On 15 March 2021, Alabama outlawed tianeptine, initially classifying it as a schedule II controlled substance. It was later reclassified as a schedule I controlled substance on 14 November 2021.

On 1 July 2022, Tennessee outlawed tianeptine and adds "any salt, sulfate, free acid, or other preparation of tianeptine, and any salt, sulfate, free acid, compound, derivative, precursor, or preparation thereof that is substantially chemically equivalent or identical with tianeptine", classifying it as a schedule II controlled substance.

On 22 December 2022, Ohio outlawed tianeptine, classifying it as a schedule I controlled substance with Ohio Governor Mike DeWine referencing the widespread availability of the chemical there as "gas-station heroin".

On 23 March 2023, Kentucky outlawed tianeptine, classifying it as a schedule I substance by an order of the Governor of Kentucky.

On 20 September 2023, Florida outlawed tianeptine, classifying it as a schedule I substance by an administrative edict issued by the Florida Attorney General.

In July 2026, the United States Drug Enforcement Administration (DEA) announced its intention to make tianeptine a Schedule I controlled substance.

== See also ==
- Amineptine
- Estianeptine
- Gas station weed
- List of antidepressants
- List of investigational anxiolytics
- Tianeptine/naloxone
