= FX-909 =

Legal status
- Legal status: Investigational

Identifiers
- IUPAC name: 3-(5,7-difluoro-4-oxo-1H-quinolin-2-yl)-4-methylsulfonylbenzonitrile
- CAS Number: 2924573-90-8
- PubChem CID: 167993670
- IUPHAR/BPS: 12626
- ChemSpider: 128921296
- UNII: 4K58KV52ZM
- ChEBI: CHEBI:760421
- ChEMBL: ChEMBL6068512

Chemical and physical data
- Formula: C_{17}H_{10}F_{2}N_{2}O_{3}S
- Molar mass: 360.33 g·mol^{−1}
- 3D model (JSmol): Interactive image
- SMILES: CS(=O)(=O)C1=C(C=C(C=C1)C#N)C2=CC(=O)C3=C(N2)C=C(C=C3F)F
- InChI: InChI=1S/C17H10F2N2O3S/c1-25(23,24)16-3-2-9(8-20)4-11(16)13-7-15(22)17-12(19)5-10(18)6-14(17)21-13/h2-7H,1H3,(H,21,22); Key:RBUBBZVQPHSZEZ-UHFFFAOYSA-N

FX-909 is a drug which acts as a selective inverse agonist at the receptor peroxisome proliferator-activated receptor gamma (PPARγ). It is being investigated as a potential therapeutic agent for a particular form of cancer, urothelial carcinoma. While PPARγ agonists are commonly used in the treatment of diabetes and have been investigated as anti-cancer drugs for other forms of cancer, in the case of urothelial carcinoma, PPARγ is a master regulator of cell differentiation in the tissue forming the inner lining of the bladder and urinary system, and PPARγ inverse agonists can inhibit the growth of tumors derived from these tissues. FX-909 is the first drug of this type to have reached human clinical trials and has performed well in early stage testing, though it has not been approved for medical use.

== See also ==
- Peroxisome proliferator-activated receptor
