= Indravadan Modi =

Indian businessman

- Born: 18 February 1926
- Died: 26 November 2012 (aged 86); Ahmedabad, Gujarat, India
- Other name: Medicine Man of India
- Education: University Department Of Chemical Technology, Bombay University
- Occupation: Founder of Cadila Pharmaceuticals Founder of IRM Founder of CPL Bio
- Spouse: Shilaben
- Children: 1

Indravadan Ambalal Modi (18 February 1926 – 26 November 2012) was an Indian pharmaceuticals industrialist who founded Cadila Pharmaceuticals in Ahmedabad. He is popularly known as the 'Medicine Man of India' for his contribution to the pharmaceutical industry of India post independence.

Modi co-founded Cadila Laboratories in 1951 along with his childhood friend Raman Patel to offer cheaper drugs in India. In 1995, the company split into two separate entities; Raman Patel formed Cadila Healthcare while Modi named his company Cadila Pharmaceuticals.

== Early life ==
Modi was born in Hansot, Bharuch. He lost his mother while he was very young and was brought up by his grandmother. He graduated in Bachelor of Science, Baroda College in 1948 and came down to Bombay for higher studies. He studied Pharmaceuticals and Fine Chemicals at University Department of Chemical Technology (UDCT). He then did a brief stint as a chief chemist in a chemical manufacturing unit before quitting to start his own venture.

== Founding of Cadila Laboratories ==
Post independence, India was dominated by multinational drug making companies. There were few Indian drug manufacturing facilities in the market. Modi, in 1952, quit his job and established Cadila Laboratories with his close friend, Ramanbhai Patel, a pharmacy professor. They pooled in their resources to start making vitamins to treat Anemia, a disease prevalent in India at that time. In the early days, his wife and grandmother helped out in the company. He would take out Rs. 250 for his monthly expenses and would invest the rest into the business. Cadila started developing innovative products such as Livirubra and Cadila Gripe and formulations such as Isopar for treatment of TB. The company focused on providing innovative products every two years. In 1967, Cadila set up its first factory. In 1970, R&D activities started happening in the company.

=== Cadila's First Employee ===
While Modi was one of the founder of the company, his wife, Shilaben was the first employee of Cadila Laboratories. She would wash and label the product herself from a 3-room apartment in Azad Society that was taken on rent for Cadila Laboratories. She inspired her husband to enter into the business of Gripe Water, the first indigenous Gripe Water made in the country.

== Cadila Pharmaceuticals and Cadila Healthcare ==
In the year 1995, Cadila Laboratories split up into Cadila Pharmaceuticals and Cadila Healthcare. Modi, owner of Cadila Pharmaceuticals, brought in his son, Rajiv Modi to take care of the business.

== Philanthropy ==
In the year 1943, Modi's cousin died due to severe illness at the age of 18, due to lack of proper healthcare. Using this as an inspiration, he set up a Kakaba and Kala-Budh Public Charitable Trust under the Bombay Public Charitable Trust Act. Under this, he set up a 30-bed hospital in the village of Hansot to provide modern healthcare facilities to those who cannot afford it at one-third of the original rates.

The trust also aids and Gujarat Government's rural development programs.

== Distinguished positions ==
- Founding member, Resurgent Group of Gujarat.
- Member, National Working Group on Patent Laws, India (NWGPL).
- Member, Indian Drug Manufacturers' Association (IDMA)
- Contributor to Indian Patents Act, 1970
- Contributor, 1986 Drug Policy of Government of India
- Vice President, CHEMEXCIL
- Promoter, B.V. Patel Pharmaceutical Education and Research Development Centre (PERD)
- President, Ahmedabad Management Association, 1991-1993

== Awards and recognition ==
- Lifetime Achievement award, June 2005, Gujarat Chamber of Commerce and Industry.
- Express Pharma Pulse Lifetime Achievement Award
- Indian Pharmaceutical Association's Ramanbhai Patel Foundation Lifetime Achievement Award
- Lifetime Achiever, Power 100: Eminent Personalities of Gujarat
- Gujarat Glories Power People 50
- Schroff Memorial National Award 1992
- Outstanding Entrepreneur Award 1993, The Federation of Gujarat Mills and Industries, Baroda
- Lifetime Achievement Award, 2009, All India Medical Association
- Lifetime Achievement Award, 2010, 3rd Annual Pharmaceutical Leadership Summit by Pharmaceutical Leadership

== Death ==
In his last days, Indravadan Modi developed a lung disease which started deteriorating and was put on a ventilator for the last 9 days. On November 26, 2012, Indravadan Modi succumbed to the infection. He was cremated in Cadila's campus of Dholka, near Ahmedabad.
