= Pemafibrate =

Chemical compound

Clinical data
- Trade names: Parmodia
- Other names: K-13675
- Routes of administration: Oral
- ATC code: C10AB12 (WHO)

Legal status
- Legal status: In general: ℞ (Prescription only)

Identifiers
- IUPAC name: (2R)-2-[3-({1,3-Benzoxazol-2-yl[3-(4-methoxyphenoxy)propyl]amino}methyl)phenoxy]butanoic acid
- CAS Number: 848259-27-8
- ChemSpider: 9700824
- UNII: 17VGG92R23
- KEGG: D10711
- ChEBI: CHEBI:228365
- ChEMBL: ChEMBL247951
- CompTox Dashboard (EPA): DTXSID00233891

Chemical and physical data
- Formula: C_{28}H_{30}N_{2}O_{6}
- Molar mass: 490.556 g·mol^{−1}
- 3D model (JSmol): Interactive image
- SMILES: CC[C@H](C(=O)O)Oc1cccc(c1)CN(CCCOc2ccc(cc2)OC)c3nc4ccccc4o3
- InChI: InChI=1S/C28H30N2O6/c1-3-25(27(31)32)35-23-9-6-8-20(18-23)19-30(28-29-24-10-4-5-11-26(24)36-28)16-7-17-34-22-14-12-21(33-2)13-15-22/h4-6,8-15,18,25H,3,7,16-17,19H2,1-2H3,(H,31,32)/t25-/m1/s1; Key:ZHKNLJLMDFQVHJ-RUZDIDTESA-N

Pemafibrate, sold under the brand name Parmodia, is a peroxisome proliferator-activated receptor alpha (PPARα) agonist. It is developed and marketed by Kowa Pharmaceuticals.

In July 2017, Pharmaceuticals and Medical Devices Agency approved it in Japan.
