= Aleglitazar =

Names
- Preferred IUPAC name (2S)-2-Methoxy-3-{4-[2-(5-methyl-2-phenyl-1,3-oxazol-4-yl)ethoxy]-1-benzothiophen-7-yl}propanoic acid
- Other names Ro-0728804, R-1439

Identifiers
CAS Number	475479-34-6
3D model (JSmol)	Interactive image; Interactive image
ChEMBL	ChEMBL519504
ChemSpider	8450255
DrugBank	DB08915
ECHA InfoCard	100.220.523
IUPHAR/BPS	7405
KEGG	D08845
PubChem CID	10274777
UNII	41T4OAG59U
CompTox Dashboard (EPA)	DTXSID70197193
- InChI: InChI=1S/C24H23NO5S/c1-15-19(25-23(30-15)16-6-4-3-5-7-16)10-12-29-20-9-8-17(14-21(28-2)24(26)27)22-18(20)11-13-31-22/h3-9,11,13,21H,10,12,14H2,1-2H3,(H,26,27)/t21-/m0/s1 Key: DAYKLWSKQJBGCS-NRFANRHFSA-N; InChI=1/C24H23NO5S/c1-15-19(25-23(30-15)16-6-4-3-5-7-16)10-12-29-20-9-8-17(14-21(28-2)24(26)27)22-18(20)11-13-31-22/h3-9,11,13,21H,10,12,14H2,1-2H3,(H,26,27)/t21-/m0/s1 Key: DAYKLWSKQJBGCS-NRFANRHFBF
- SMILES: CC1=C(CCOc2ccc(C[C@H](OC)C(O[H])=O)c3c2C=CS3)N=C(c4ccccc4)O1; O=C(O)[C@@H](OC)Cc4ccc(OCCc1nc(oc1C)c2ccccc2)c3c4scc3

Properties
Chemical formula	C_{24}H_{23}NO_{5}S
Molar mass	437.51 g·mol^{−1}
- Except where otherwise noted, data are given for materials in their standard state (at 25 °C [77 °F], 100 kPa). verify (what is ?) Infobox references

Aleglitazar is a peroxisome proliferator-activated receptor agonist (hence a PPAR modulator) with affinity to PPARα and PPARγ, which was under development by Hoffmann–La Roche for the treatment of type II diabetes. It is no longer in phase III clinical trials.
