= Tianeptinaline =

Clinical data
- Drug class: Histone deacetylase inhibitor; Cognitive enhancer
- ATC code: None

Identifiers
- IUPAC name: N-(2-aminophenyl)-7-[(3-chloro-6-methyl-5,5-dioxo-11H-benzo[c][2,1]benzothiazepin-11-yl)amino]heptanamide
- CAS Number: 2234276-00-5
- PubChem CID: 73707549
- ChemSpider: 58169177
- ChEBI: CHEBI:125437

Chemical and physical data
- Formula: C_{27}H_{31}ClN_{4}O_{3}S
- Molar mass: 527.08 g·mol^{−1}
- 3D model (JSmol): Interactive image
- SMILES: CN1C2=CC=CC=C2C(C3=C(S1(=O)=O)C=C(C=C3)Cl)NCCCCCCC(=O)NC4=CC=CC=C4N
- InChI: InChI=1S/C27H31ClN4O3S/c1-32-24-13-8-5-10-20(24)27(21-16-15-19(28)18-25(21)36(32,34)35)30-17-9-3-2-4-14-26(33)31-23-12-7-6-11-22(23)29/h5-8,10-13,15-16,18,27,30H,2-4,9,14,17,29H2,1H3,(H,31,33); Key:MDZWCUNUQCQODR-UHFFFAOYSA-N

Tianeptinaline is a histone deacetylase (HDAC) inhibitor which was derived via structural modification of the tricyclic antidepressant (TCA) tianeptine.

== Pharmacology ==
Activities
Enzyme	IC_{50} (nM)
HDAC1	240
HDAC2	120
HDAC3	155
HDAC4	ND
HDAC5	>80,000
HDAC6	>80,000
HDAC7	ND
HDAC8	ND
HDAC9	ND
HDAC10	ND
HDAC11	ND
Refs:

Tianeptinaline potently inhibits the class I HDAC1, HDAC2, and HDAC3 with IC_{50} values of 240 nM, 120 nM, and 155 nM, whereas it did not inhibit the class II HDAC5 or HDAC6 (IC_{50} = >80,000 nM). Potential actions against other HDACs, such as HDAC4, HDAC7, HDAC8, and HDAC9, were not described. The drug has been found to enhance CREB-mediated transcription, penetrate into the brain, and enhance contextual fear conditioning, a behavioral measure of hippocampus-dependent memory, in rodents.

== Chemistry ==
The chemical synthesis of tianeptinaline has been described. Another analogue of tianeptinaline, known as tianeptinostat, is also a potent HDAC inhibitor. However, whereas tianeptinaline did not inhibit HDAC6, tianeptinostat was a highly potent inhibitor of HDAC6 in addition to the class I HDACs.

== History ==
Tianeptinaline and tianeptinostat were first described in the scientific literature by 2018. They were derived from tianeptine after it was noted that tianeptine has a similar chemical structure to that of the potent clinically used HDAC inhibitor vorinostat (SAHA) and that tianeptine itself is a weak HDAC inhibitor (IC_{50} = 25,000 nM, 82,000 nM, and >2 mM at HDAC1, HDAC2, and HDAC3, respectively).

== See also ==
- Histone deacetylase inhibitor
- Tianeptine
- Tacedinaline
- Estianeptine
