= Ramanbhai Patel =

Indian chemist

Ramanbhai B. Patel
- Born: 19 August 1925; Kathor in South Gujarat, India.
- Died: 19 September 2001 (aged 76); Mumbai, India.
- Years active: 1940s-2001
- Known for: Chemistry
- Awards: Gandhi Mandela Peace (2019)

Ramanbhai B. Patel (19 August 1925 – 19 September 2001) was an Indian chemist who founded the operation, along with school friend I A Modi, that eventually became the Ahmedabad-based pharmaceutical company Cadila Laboratories.

Patel was born at Kathor in South Gujarat and studied chemistry at Gujarat University's L.M. College of Pharmacy before becoming a lecturer there. With Indravadan Modi he founded Cadila Laboratories in 1952.

Among the early achievements of Cadila Laboratories were the production of Isopar, a formulation of the anti-tuberculosis drugs Isoniazid & Para-amino salicylic acid in 1957, and Neuroxin-12, a single-vial mixture of vitamin B_{1}, vitamin B_{6}, and vitamin B_{12}, in 1959. In 1973 the firm developed process technology to make the anti-diabetic drug glibenclamide, while in 1977 the firm launched Dexona-20, which was a concentrated form of the anti-inflammatory drug dexamethasone.

In 1995, after a disagreement between Patel and Modi, Cadila Laboratories was restructured with the business being split two ways. Cadila Healthcare was set up to take the Patel's share of the business and Cadila Pharmaceutical took Modi's share. Patel was chairman and managing director of Cadila Healthcare until his death. Cadila Healthcare went public on the Bombay Stock Exchange in 2000. His son Pankaj Patel (born 1951) is the current Chairman and Managing Director of Cadila Healthcare.

Dr Raman Bhai Patel hosted Gandhi Mandela Peace Award 2019.
