= Tianeptine/naloxone =

Abandoned antidepressant

- Tianeptine

- Naloxone

Combination of
- Tianeptine: Atypical μ-opioid receptor agonist
- Naloxone: Orally inactive μ-opioid receptor antagonist

Clinical data
- Other names: Naloxone/tianeptine; Tianeptine oxalate/naloxone; Naloxone/tianeptine oxalate; Tianeptine hemioxalate/naloxone; Naloxone/tianeptine hemioxalate; TNX-601; TNX601; TNX-601 CR; TNX-601-CR; TNX-601 ER; TNX-601-ER
- Routes of administration: Oral

Tianeptine/naloxone (developmental code names TNX-601, TNX-601-CR, TNX-601-ER), or naloxone/tianeptine, is an extended-release combination of tianeptine, an atypical μ-opioid receptor agonist, and naloxone, an orally inactive μ-opioid receptor antagonist, which was under development for the treatment of major depressive disorder, post-traumatic stress disorder (PTSD), and neurocognitive dysfunction associated with corticosteroid use but was never marketed.

Whereas tianeptine is marketed widely throughout Europe, Asia, and Latin America but is not available in the United States or the United Kingdom, tianeptine/naloxone was under development for registration in the United States and other countries. In addition, whereas tianeptine has a short duration of action and requires administration three times per day, tianeptine/naloxone was developed as an extended-release formulation with enhanced pharmacokinetics suitable for once-daily administration. The combination formulation employs tianeptine as the oxalate salt, which is said to have improved physicochemical properties for use in the extended-release formulation compared to the amorphous tianeptine sodium that is used in immediate-release tianeptine-only formulations. Naloxone is used in misuse-resistant oral drug formulations as it is inactive if taken orally but becomes active if oral tablets are crushed and administered parenterally, such as by injection.

Tianeptine/naloxone reached phase 2 clinical trials for major depressive disorder and phase 1 clinical trials for post-traumatic stress disorders and cognition dysfunction related to corticosteroid use prior to the discontinuation of its development. Its development was discontinued for all indications in October 2023 due to lack of effectiveness for major depressive disorder in a phase 2 clinical trial.

== See also ==
- Tianeptine
- List of investigational antidepressants
- Estianeptine
