= Zydus Lifesciences =

Indian multinational pharmaceutical company

Zydus Lifesciences Limited
- Type: Public
- Traded as: BSE: 532321; NSE: ZYDUSLIFE
- Industry: Pharmaceuticals
- Founded: 1952; 74 years ago
- Founder: Ramanbhai Patel
- Headquarters: Ahmedabad, Gujarat, India
- Key people: Pankaj R. Patel (Chairman); Sharvil P. Patel (Managing Director)
- Products: Pharmaceuticals; generic drugs; over-the-counter drugs; vaccines; diagnostics; contact lenses; animal health
- Revenue: ▲₹27,148 crore (US$2.8 billion) (2026)
- Operating income: ▲₹8,475 crore (US$880 million) (2026)
- Net income: ▲₹5,040 crore (US$520 million) (2026)
- Number of employees: 27,000+ (2026)
- Subsidiaries: Zydus Wellness (57.59%)
- Website: www.zyduslife.com
- Footnotes; Financials as of 31 March 2025.

Zydus Lifesciences Limited, formerly known as Cadila Healthcare Limited, is an Indian multinational pharmaceutical company, headquartered in Ahmedabad, India. Primarily engaged in the manufacturing of generic drugs, the company ranked 100th in the Fortune India 500 list in 2020.

== History ==
Cadila was founded in 1952 by Ramanbhai Patel (1925–2001), formerly a lecturer in the L.M. College of Pharmacy, and his business partner Indravadan Modi.

In 1995, the Patel and Modi families split; the Modi family's share was moved into a new company called Cadila Pharmaceuticals, and Cadila Healthcare became the Patel family's holding company. Cadila Healthcare had its initial public offering in February 2000 and listed on the BSE.

In 2003, the company merged another Indian pharmaceutical company called German Remedies into itself. On 25 June 2007, the company acquired Química e Farmacêutica Nikkho do Brasil Ltda (Nikkho) as part of Zydus Healthcare Brasil Ltda.

In 2014, Cadila Healthcare launched the world's first adalimumab biosimilar under the brand name Exemptia at one-fifth the originator's price. Zydus Cadila Healthcare has also launched its first research based drug molecule Saroglitazar in the treatment of Diabetic Dyslipidemia under brand name "Lipaglyn". SoviHep is the first sofosbuvir brand launched in India by Zydus in the year 2015.

In 2019, injectable ketorolac tromethamine manufactured by Zydus (Cadila Healthcare) was recalled due to microbial growth.

In 2020, Zydus Cadila's drug Desidustat received approval by the USFDA to initiate clinical trials on cancer patients.

In 2022, Cadila Healthcare Ltd was renamed as Zydus Lifesciences Ltd.

In October 2024, USFDA Approval for Prostate Cancer Drug: Zydus Lifesciences received USFDA approval to manufacture enzalutamide tablets, which are used for treating prostate cancer. This drug, an androgen receptor inhibitor, is designed for patients with castration-resistant and metastatic castration-sensitive prostate cancer. The product will be manufactured at Zydus' facility in Ahmedabad. This approval is part of the company's broader efforts to expand its portfolio of cancer treatments in the U.S. market.

In 2025, Zydus acquired the CDMO business of Agenus including their two biologics manufacturing sites in Emeryville and Berkeley. In addition, they would partner with Agenus to commercialize their molecules in India.

=== Acquisition history ===
The following is an illustration of the company's major mergers and acquisitions and historical predecessors (this is not a comprehensive list):

- Zydus Lifescience
  - Cadila Healthcare (Split from Cadila 1995)
  - German Remedies (Acq 2003)
  - Química e Farmacêutica Nikkho do Brasil Ltda (Nikkho) (Acq 2007)
  - Agenus (Acq 2025)

== Products ==
From twenty-five pharmaceutical production operations in India and Zydus Cadila develops and manufactures an extensive range of pharmaceuticals as well as diagnostics, herbal products, skincare products and other OTC products. Starting from late 2015, having concluded a voluntary license agreement with Gilead, the company also produces the generics for hepatitis C treatment (i.e. sofosbuvir, distributed under the brand name SoviHep).

The company makes active pharmaceutical ingredients at three sites in India, Ankleshwar plants, Vadodara plant, and Patalganga plant.

== COVID-19 vaccine development ==
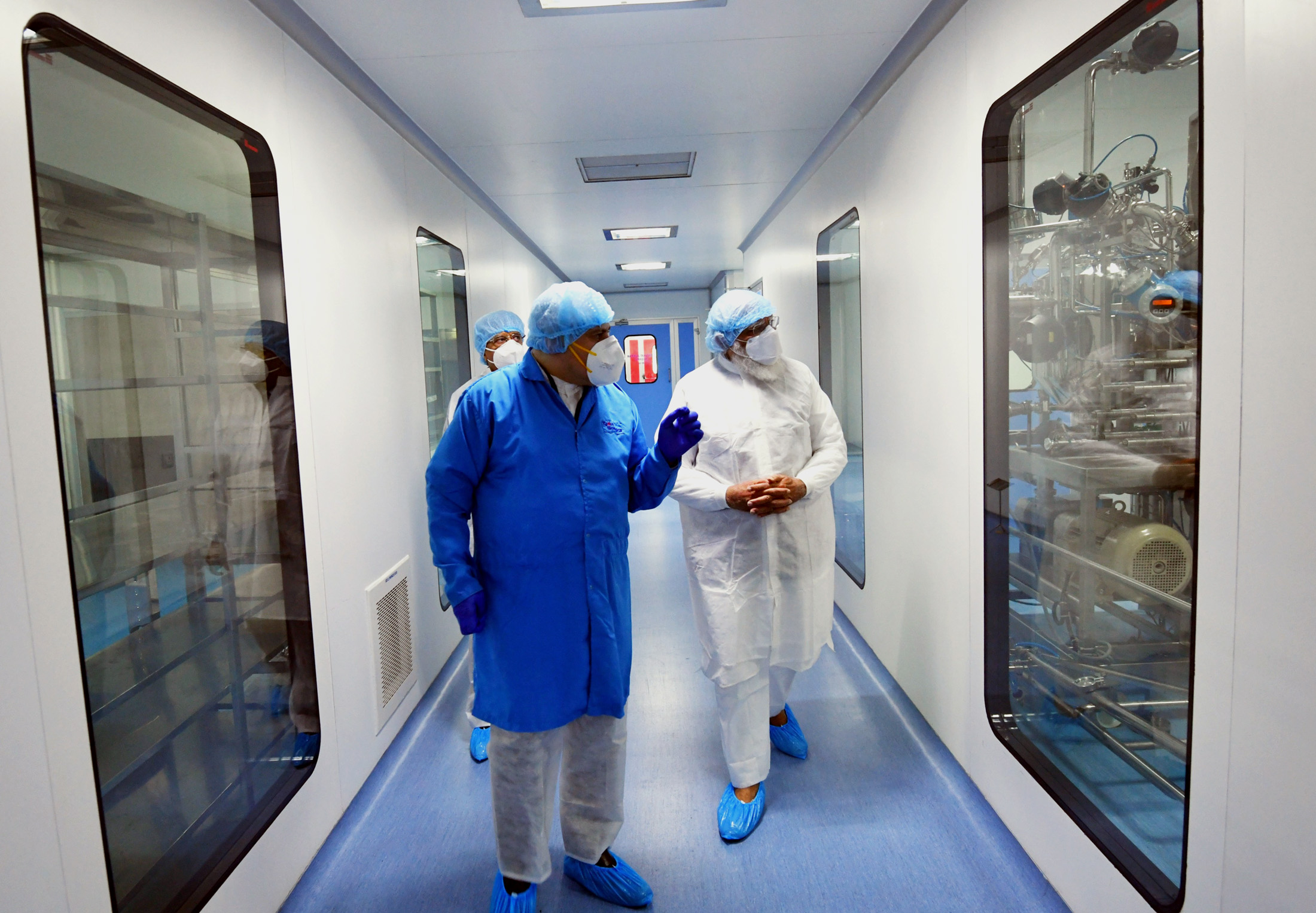
Prime Minister Narendra Modi during his visit to the Zydus Biotech Park in Ahmedabad in 2020.

In July 2020, the company got permission to conduct human trials of the developmental COVID-19 vaccine named ZyCoV-D, from the Drugs Controller General of India (DCGI), Government of India. On 20 August 2021, DCGI granted emergency use approval of ZyCoV-D.

Cadila is also among the several Indian pharma companies that received the licensing agreements from the Gilead Sciences to produce remdesivir.

== Corporate control ==
Zydus Cadila's major shareholder remains the Patel family. Pankaj Patel (born 1953), son of the founder, is the chairman of the company. In 2004, Pankaj Patel was included in Forbes' annual list of India's richest people. As of 2020, Forbes estimates Patel's net worth at US$3.9 billion, making him India's 46th richest person.

== Controversies ==
A Mint investigative report in 2021 claimed that Zydus Lifesciences supplied possibly bacteria-contaminated batches of remdesivir to hospitals in Uttar Pradesh, Rajasthan, Maharashtra, Gujarat and Bihar, allegedly making hundreds of already sick COVID-19 patients even sicker. Zydus was manufacturing the remdesivir in their Gujarat factory under license from United States' Gilead Sciences. In May 2021, when state procurement agency Rajasthan Medical Services Corporation sought an explanation, Zydus stated that they had not seen similar adverse reactions to their remdesivir elsewhere and denied all contamination allegations.

In December 2016, Zydus Discovery DMCC, a research subsidiary Zydus Lifesciences, was cited by the US FDA for deliberately misbranding their flagship product, Saroglitazar—the drug used to treat diabetic dyslipidemia in India. In a 21 December 2016 letter to the company, the US FDA asked it to stop using broad statements, such as the "world's first" and to stop suggesting that the drug is approved throughout the world, including in the United States, when that is not true.

== See also ==
- Pharmaceutical industry in India
