= Neutral amino acid transporter B(0) =

Protein-coding gene in the species Homo sapiens

SLC1A5

Identifiers
- Aliases: SLC1A5, AAAT, ASCT2, ATBO, M7V1, M7VS1, R16, RDRC, solute carrier family 1 member 5
- External IDs: OMIM: 109190; MGI: 105305; GeneCards: SLC1A5

Gene location (Human)
Chr.	Chromosome 19 (human)
Band	19q13.32	Start	46,774,883 bp
Band	19q13.32	End	46,788,594 bp

Gene location (Mouse)
Chr.	Chromosome 7 (mouse)
Band	7|7 A2	Start	16,515,265 bp
Band	7|7 A2	End	16,532,199 bp
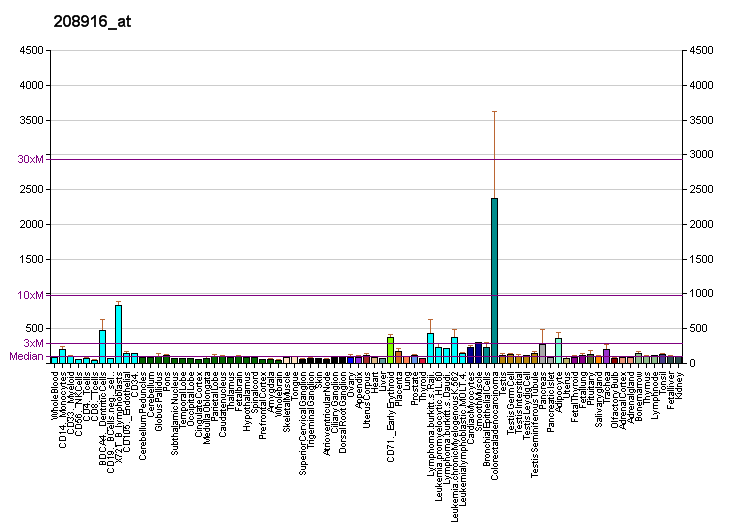
RNA expression pattern
Bgee	Human / Mouse (ortholog); Top expressed in: stromal cell of endometrium; olfactory zone of nasal mucosa; minor salivary glands; upper lobe of left lung; mucosa of transverse colon; left uterine tube; mucosa of esophagus; right lung; right coronary artery; left coronary artery / Top expressed in: subcutaneous adipose tissue; white adipose tissue; ankle joint; tunica adventitia of aorta; lactiferous gland; brown adipose tissue; intercostal muscle; submandibular gland; crypt of lieberkuhn of small intestine; fetal liver hematopoietic progenitor cell; More reference expression data
BioGPS	More reference expression data
Gene ontology
Molecular function	L-glutamine transmembrane transporter activity; virus receptor activity; neutral amino acid transmembrane transporter activity; protein binding; symporter activity; L-serine transmembrane transporter activity; amino acid transmembrane transporter activity; signaling receptor activity; metal ion binding
Cellular component	integral component of membrane; membrane; melanosome; plasma membrane; integral component of plasma membrane; extracellular exosome
Biological process	viral entry into host cell; neutral amino acid transport; glutamine transport; L-serine transport; viral process; glutamine secretion; L-glutamine import across plasma membrane; amino acid transport; transport; protein homotrimerization
Sources:Amigo / QuickGO
Orthologs
Databases	NCBI: entry; OMA: entry
Species	Human	Mouse
Entrez	6510	20514
Ensembl	ENSG00000105281	ENSMUSG00000001918
UniProt	Q15758	P51912
RefSeq (mRNA)	NM_001145144; NM_001145145; NM_005628	NM_009201
RefSeq (protein)	NP_001138616; NP_001138617; NP_005619	n/a
Location (UCSC)	Chr 19: 46.77 – 46.79 Mb	Chr 7: 16.52 – 16.53 Mb
PubMed search
- Wikidata
View/Edit Human	View/Edit Mouse

Neutral amino acid transporter B(0) is a protein that in humans is encoded by the SLC1A5 gene.

== See also ==
- Glutamate transporter
- Solute carrier family
