= Elizabeth Rose (academic) =

Professor of international business

- Awards: Fellow of the Academy of International Business

Academic background
- Education: Princeton University, University of Michigan
- Thesis: Bayesian vector autoregressive models for business forecasting (1989)

Elizabeth Louise Rose is an American academic, and is Professor in Business Policy and Strategy at the Indian Institute of Management Udaipur. Rose's research focuses on international business, covering topics such as how small and medium size enterprises internationalise, and how firms compete across borders.

== Academic career ==
Rose completed a Bachelor of Science in Engineering at Princeton University, followed by a Master of Science in Engineering, a Master of Statistics and a PhD in business administration at the University of Michigan. Rose worked as a production engineer for Ford Motor Company before moving into academia, lecturing at University of Southern California, University of Auckland and Victoria University of Wellington. She was appointed Professor of International Business at Aalto University in Finland and then joined the faculty of the University of Otago in 2013. She then moved to the University of Leeds, and as of 2024, is Research Chair Professor in Business Policy and Strategy at the Indian Institute of Management Udaipur, whilst retaining a role as Visiting Senior Research Fellow at Leeds.

In 2020 Rose was appointed as a co-editor of the Academy of Management Collections alongside Professor Benjamin Galvin of Brigham Young University.

Rose's research focuses on international business and strategy, covering topics such as how firms internationalise, and competition across borders. She is interested in how small and medium size enterprises internationalise, in Japanese businesses, and in the service sector.

== Awards ==
Rose was elected a Fellow of the International Academy of Business in 2016.
