= Peroxisome proliferator-activated receptor delta =

Nuclear receptor protein found in humans

PPARD
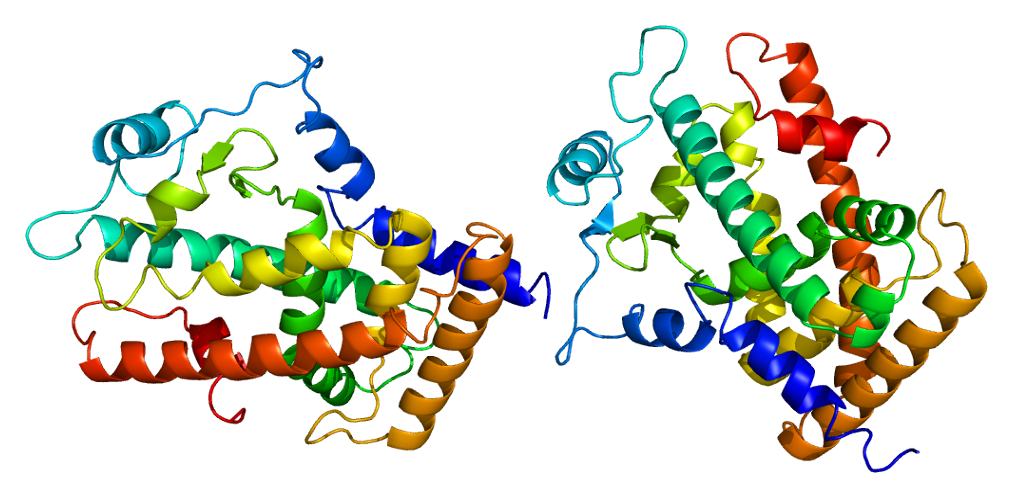

Identifiers
- Aliases: PPARD, FAAR, NR1C2, NUC1, NUCI, NUCII, PPARB, peroxisome proliferator activated receptor delta
- External IDs: OMIM: 600409; MGI: 101884; GeneCards: PPARD
Available structures
PDB	Ortholog search: PDBe RCSB
PDB	List of PDB id codes 1GWX, 1Y0S, 2AWH, 2B50, 2BAW, 2ENV, 2GWX, 2J14, 2Q5G, 2XYJ, 2XYW, 2XYX, 2ZNP, 2ZNQ, 3D5F, 3DY6, 3ET2, 3GWX, 3GZ9, 3OZ0, 3PEQ, 3SP9, 3TKM

Gene location (Human)
Chr.	Chromosome 6 (human)
Band	6p21.31	Start	35,342,558 bp
Band	6p21.31	End	35,428,191 bp

Gene location (Mouse)
Chr.	Chromosome 17 (mouse)
Band	17 A3.3|17 14.64 cM	Start	28,232,700 bp
Band	17 A3.3|17 14.64 cM	End	28,301,474 bp
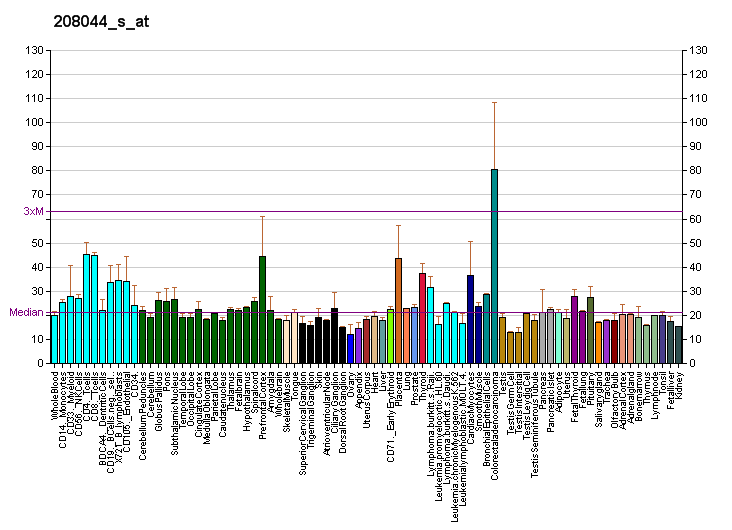

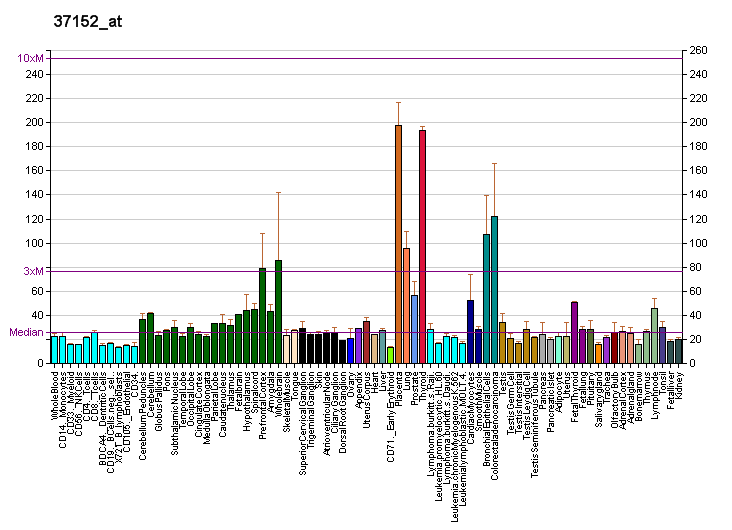
RNA expression pattern
Bgee	Human / Mouse (ortholog); Top expressed in: cartilage tissue; skin of thigh; tail of epididymis; buccal mucosa cell; amniotic fluid; right lobe of thyroid gland; left lobe of thyroid gland; corpus epididymis; mucosa of transverse colon; placenta / Top expressed in: zygote; lip; esophagus; secondary oocyte; interventricular septum; muscle of thigh; genital tubercle; colon; granulocyte; jejunum; More reference expression data
BioGPS	More reference expression data
Gene ontology
Molecular function	sequence-specific DNA binding; transcription coactivator activity; zinc ion binding; metal ion binding; steroid hormone receptor activity; fatty acid binding; protein binding; linoleic acid binding; protein heterodimerization activity; lipid binding; DNA-binding transcription factor activity; transcription factor binding; nuclear receptor activity; DNA binding; DNA-binding transcription repressor activity, RNA polymerase II-specific; DNA-binding transcription factor activity, RNA polymerase II-specific; NF-kappaB binding; transcription cis-regulatory region binding; RNA polymerase II transcription regulatory region sequence-specific DNA binding; nuclear receptor coactivator activity; signaling receptor activity
Cellular component	nucleoplasm; nucleus; RNA polymerase II transcription regulator complex
Biological process	fatty acid catabolic process; positive regulation of myoblast proliferation; positive regulation of epidermis development; cell differentiation; negative regulation of smooth muscle cell proliferation; negative regulation of myoblast differentiation; regulation of transcription, DNA-templated; placenta development; regulation of transcription by RNA polymerase II; negative regulation of smooth muscle cell migration; wound healing; mRNA transcription; cholesterol metabolic process; negative regulation of apoptotic process; response to glucose; response to activity; response to organic substance; generation of precursor metabolites and energy; regulation of fat cell differentiation; transcription, DNA-templated; positive regulation of transcription, DNA-templated; response to vitamin A; development of the heart; cell-substrate adhesion; keratinocyte proliferation; positive regulation of gene expression; proteoglycan metabolic process; regulation of cell population proliferation; negative regulation of cell growth; fatty acid oxidation; positive regulation of cell population proliferation; glucose metabolic process; phospholipid biosynthetic process; negative regulation of epithelial cell proliferation; positive regulation of skeletal muscle tissue regeneration; apoptotic signaling pathway; vitamin A metabolic process; positive regulation of phosphatidylinositol 3-kinase signaling; keratinocyte migration; adipose tissue development; transcription initiation from RNA polymerase II promoter; regulation of skeletal muscle satellite cell proliferation; positive regulation of fat cell differentiation; negative regulation of transcription, DNA-templated; negative regulation of inflammatory response; cellular response to lipopolysaccharide; cellular response to hypoxia; negative regulation of collagen biosynthetic process; positive regulation of insulin secretion; steroid hormone mediated signaling pathway; apoptotic process; cell population proliferation; negative regulation of transcription by RNA polymerase II; intracellular receptor signaling pathway; axon ensheathment; decidualization; fatty acid transport; embryo implantation; negative regulation of pri-miRNA transcription by RNA polymerase II; lipid metabolism; fatty acid beta-oxidation; glucose transmembrane transport; fatty acid metabolic process; multicellular organism development; hormone-mediated signaling pathway; negative regulation of cholesterol storage; regulation of lipid metabolic process; response to lipid; positive regulation of transcription by RNA polymerase II
Sources:Amigo / QuickGO
Orthologs
Databases	NCBI: entry; OMA: entry
Species	Human	Mouse
Entrez	5467	19015
Ensembl	ENSG00000112033	ENSMUSG00000002250
UniProt	Q03181	P35396
RefSeq (mRNA)	NM_001171818; NM_001171819; NM_001171820; NM_006238; NM_177435	NM_011145
RefSeq (protein)	NP_001165289; NP_001165290; NP_001165291; NP_006229; NP_803184	NP_035275
Location (UCSC)	Chr 6: 35.34 – 35.43 Mb	Chr 17: 28.23 – 28.3 Mb
PubMed search
- Wikidata
View/Edit Human	View/Edit Mouse

Peroxisome proliferator-activated receptor delta (PPAR-delta), or (PPAR-beta), also known as Nuclear hormone receptor 1 (NUC1) is a nuclear receptor that in humans is encoded by the PPARD gene.

This gene encodes a member of the peroxisome proliferator-activated receptor (PPAR) family. It was first identified in Xenopus in 1993.

== Function ==
PPAR-delta is a nuclear hormone receptor that governs a variety of biological processes and may be involved in the development of several chronic diseases, including diabetes, obesity, atherosclerosis, and cancer.

In muscle PPARD expression is increased by exercise, resulting in increased oxidative (fat-burning) capacity and an increase in type I fibers. Both PPAR-delta and AMPK agonists are regarded as exercise mimetics. In adipose tissue PPAR-β/δ increases both oxidation as well as uncoupling of oxidative phosphorylation.

PPAR-delta may function as an integrator of transcription repression and nuclear receptor signaling. It activates transcription of a variety of target genes by binding to specific DNA elements. Well described target genes of PPARδ include PDK4, ANGPTL4, PLIN2, and CD36. The expression of this gene is found to be elevated in colorectal cancer cells. The elevated expression can be repressed by adenomatosis polyposis coli (APC), a tumor suppressor protein involved in the APC/beta-catenin signaling pathway. Knockout studies in mice suggested the role of this protein in myelination of the corpus callosum, epidermal cell proliferation, and glucose and lipid metabolism.

This protein has been shown to be involved in differentiation, lipid accumulation, directional sensing, polarization, and migration in keratinocytes.

=== Role in cancer ===
Studies into the role of PPAR-delta in cancer have produced contradictory results. Although there is some controversy, the majority of studies have suggested that PPAR-delta activation could result in changes that are favorable to cancer progression. Work by Wagner and colleagues has reported that vascular PPARβ/δ promotes tumour angiogenesis and progression.

== Tissue distribution ==
PPAR-delta is highly expressed in many tissues, including colon, small intestine, liver and keratinocytes, as well as in heart, spleen, skeletal muscle, lung, brain and thymus.

== Knockout studies ==
Knockout mice lacking the ligand binding domain of PPAR-delta are viable. However, these mice are smaller than the wild type both neo and postnatally. In addition, fat stores in the gonads of the mutants are smaller. The mutants also display increased epidermal hyperplasia upon induction with TPA.

== Ligands ==
PPAR-delta is activated in the cell by various fatty acids and fatty acid derivatives. Examples of naturally occurring fatty acids that bind with and activate PPAR-delta include arachidonic acid and certain members of the 15-hydroxyicosatetraenoic acid family of arachidonic acid metabolites including 15(S)-HETE, 15(R)-HETE, and 15-HpETE. Several high affinity ligands for PPAR-delta have been developed, including GW501516 and GW0742, which play an important role in research. In one study utilizing such a ligand, it has been shown that agonism of PPARδ changes the body's fuel preference from glucose to lipids. Initially, PPAR-delta agonists were considered promising therapies as an exercise mimetic that could treat metabolic syndrome, and evidence of possible pro-cancer effects subsequently emerged. Clinical development of the class nonetheless continued in other indications: the selective PPAR-delta agonist seladelpar received accelerated approval from the US Food and Drug Administration in August 2024 for primary biliary cholangitis.

The atypical antidepressant Tianeptine has been shown to be a high-efficacy PPAR-delta agonist.

=== Agonists ===
- GW501516
- GW0742
- Seladelpar
- Telmisartan
- Tianeptine
  - Estianeptine

Although its drug development was discontinued due to animal studies suggesting an increased risk of cancer, GW501516 has been used as a performance enhancing drug. It and other PPAR-delta agonists are banned in sports.

== Interactions ==
Peroxisome proliferator-activated receptor delta has been shown to interact with HDAC3 and NCOR2.
