= Pankaj Patel =

Indian businessman (born 1953)

Pankaj Ramanbhai Patel
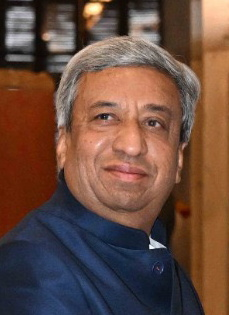
- Pankaj Patel in 2025
- Born: 16 March 1953 (age 73); Bhadran, Gujarat, India
- Education: Sheth Chimanlal Nagindas Vidyalaya (BA); L.M. College of Pharmacy (M.Pharm); University of Mumbai (LLB)
- Occupation: Businessman
- Known for: President, FICCI; Chairman, Zydus
- Spouse: Priti Patel
- Children: 2

Pankaj Ramanbhai Patel (born 16 March 1953) is an Indian billionaire businessman, and the chairman of Zydus Lifesciences, the fifth largest pharmaceutical company in India.

In October 2024, Patel was ranked 24th on the Forbes list of India's 100 richest tycoons, with a net worth of $10.2 billion.

In January 2025, he was conferred the Padma Bhushan, the country's third highest civilian award for his contribution in the field of Trade and Industry.

== Early life ==
Pankaj Patel is a Gujarati. He was the leader of the Rashtriya Vidhyarthi Parishad and active leader of the Navmiraman Movement. Since he was eight years old, he would go to the factory with his father and would watch employees working on tablets machines. Patel holds Bachelor of Pharmacy and Master of Pharmacy degrees from L.M. College of Pharmacy, Gujarat University, as well as a Bachelor of Arts in Science and Law from the University of Mumbai.

== Zydus journey ==
Patel, in 1976 after graduation, joined the firm Cadila Healthcare, which was founded by his father in 1952 to make vitamins.

In 1995, Cadila Laboratories and Cadila Healthcare split under Zydus Group. Zydus's word is taken from the Greek god, Zeus. The letter D was added to Zeus, and it became Zydus. He took charge in 1995 after a formal separation between the two founding families from Zydus Cadila to Zydus Lifesciences and Cadila Healthcare. When he took over the Cadila Healthcare, he was faced with two challenges: His was a Rs. 200-crore company whereas his overheads including management, research, company expenses, and staff worked out to Rs. 400 crore. It was difficult to make two ends meet.

They were the first Indian company to develop a drug for high-cholesterol diabetics. They received approval from regulators in 2013 to sell Lipaglyn, a drug that controls both blood sugar and cholesterol levels and the world's first drug to treat diabetic dyslipidemia. They also make a tablet named Aten (Atenolol) which is used as a medication to control blood pressure.

The Sugar-Free brand created by Zydus Wellness has proved to be ubiquitous sugar substitute and Everyuth face wash also propelled the company to newer heights.

Patel played an active role in fighting against swine flu by securing approval from the Drug Controller General of India to launch VaxiFlu-s, the first Indian H1N1 vaccine and one of only few such vaccines globally. He had left behind all the vaccine-only manufacturers of the country in development and launch of this vaccine. Their vaccine portfolio which is perhaps the largest in the Indian pharma industry that covers over twelve vaccines.

The company under his leadership grew to be the fifth largest drugmaker in India with operations in 70 countries worldwide. In the animal healthcare segment, it ranks second in India. From a turnover of Rs. 250 crore in 1995 to Rs. 1,000 crore in 2000, the Group posted revenues of over Rs. 6300 crore in FY2013. It has its manufacturing and research facilities in five states across India and is globally present in markets such as the US, Europe (France and Spain), Latin America, South Africa and 25 other emerging markets. They formed an alliance with German biotech firm Pieris Pharmaceuticals for developing and marketing a new class of protein therapeutics. Zydus was the first to file to sell a generic version of Shire PLC's $1.1 billion ulcer drug, Lialda, in the U.S. and the FDA had awarded it six months of exclusivity.

He is also the chairman of Zydus Hospitals, a large chain of hospitals in Gujarat.

During the COVID-19 pandemic, Patel ramped up production to become one of the largest suppliers of hydroxychloroquine and also came out with a variant of in-demand drug Remdesivir. It was also in the process to develop vaccine to fight COVID called as Zycov-D.

== Leadership positions ==
In 2016–2017, he became the president of FICCI. It is India's oldest, largest, non-government, not-for-profit, and apex business organization.

He was a board member for eight years prior to becoming the chairman of the Board of governors of the Indian Institute of Management, Ahmedabad.

He is also the chairman of the board of governors of the Indian Institute of Science Education and Research, Kolkata; Indian Institute of Technology, Bhubaneswar, Indian Institute of Management, Udaipur and Kamla Nehru Institute of Technology, Sultanpur. He is a Member of the governing board of The Ahmedabad University, Chairman of School of Life Sciences, Ahmedabad University and Member of the board of management of the Narsee Monjee Institute of Management Studies.

Since 2011, he is also the Executive Chairman, Vice President and Trustee of the Gujarat Cancer Society and Chairman of the Gujarat Cancer and Research Institute, a Regional Cancer Centre and one of the largest cancer centres in India, reaching out to the needy and underprivileged cancer patients.

He also officiates on the board of several not-for-profit and charitable institutions. He also officiates as the Chairman of the Deaf and Mute School, Ahmedabad. He is also a Director and chairman on the Board of Zydus Foundation which set up Zydus Hospital and Medical College, Dahod.

Patel has been appointed as the Part Time Non-official Director in Central Board of the Reserve Bank of India for a period of four years. He is a member of several other organisations including Invest India, Mission Steering Group (MSG), the highest policy-making and steering body constituted under the National Health Mission (NHM), and Drug Technical Advisory Board by the Ministry of Health & Family Welfare. He is also a Member of the Governing Board of India Pharmacopoeia Commission (IPC), Ministry of Health & Family Welfare, Government of India. He is also a Member of the CEO Advisory Committee of International Generics and Biosimilars Association (IGBA).

He also is a member of many prestigious societies including Indian Pharmaceutical Alliance, Indian Drug Manufacturers Association, Basic Chemicals, Pharmaceuticals and Cosmetics Export Promotion Council, and Gujarat Chambers of Commerce and Industry.

== Honors and awards ==
Patel was named the "Best Pharma Man of the year 2004" by the Foundation of Indian Industry and Economists in recognition of the growth of Cadila under his leadership. At that time, Patel predicted that Zydus Cadila would become the third-largest pharmaceutical company in India by 2005.

He has published over 100 research papers in peer-reviewed journals and is a co-inventor in more than 64 patents. He has been conferred with Dsc. (Honoris Causa) by Dr. A.P.J. Abdul Kalam Technical University, Lucknow.

The World Pharmaceutical Frontiers ranked him in their First Pharma 40 list of ‘world's most influential people in the field of healthcare.

In recognition of his contributions to the healthcare industry in India, Patel is a recipient of several awards including the Acharya PC Ray Memorial Gold Medal Award and the Eminent Pharmacist Award, the India Innovator Award at the India Business Leaders Awards instituted by CNBC. For his entrepreneurial vision, Patel was awarded the Ernst & Young Entrepreneur of the Year Award in the Life Sciences category. In January 2025, he was conferred the Padma Bhushan for his contribution in the field of trade and industry.

== Personal life ==
He is married to Priti Patel, a daughter of Dr. B D Patel. They have two children. Their son Dr. Sharvil Patel is managing director of Cadila Healthcare Ltd., and is married to Meha. Their daughter Shivani is married to Pranav D Patel, son of Dushyant D Patel. He is fond of traveling and would go out for outing every vacation especially near rivers or mountains. He is also interested in theatre.

In August 2012, Patel, along with Dinesh Patel, the chairman of Sintex Industries, purchased a Challenger-604 jet.

Patel is a well-known philanthropist in India. He believes that philanthropic work is more than just donating in monetary terms. It is also about non-monetary aspects like giving your time, ideas, volunteering, etc. Pankaj does not like to share his donations, and hence most of them are undisclosed.
