= GW0742 =

PPAR β/δ receptor Agonist compound

Clinical data
- ATC code: None

Legal status
- Legal status: Investigational

Identifiers
- IUPAC name: [4-[[[2-[3-fluoro-4-(trifluoromethyl)phenyl]-4-methyl-5-thiazolyl]methyl]thio]-2-methyl phenoxy]-acetic acid
- CAS Number: 317318-84-6
- PubChem CID: 9934458
- IUPHAR/BPS: 2686
- ChemSpider: 8110086
- UNII: 4PZK9FJC4Z
- KEGG: C15625
- ChEMBL: ChEMBL38508
- CompTox Dashboard (EPA): DTXSID9040760

Chemical and physical data
- Formula: C_{21}H_{17}F_{4}NO_{3}S_{2}
- Molar mass: 471.48 g·mol^{−1}
- 3D model (JSmol): Interactive image
- SMILES: FC(F)(F)c3c(F)cc(c1nc(c(s1)CSc2cc(c(OCC(=O)O)cc2)C)C)cc3
- InChI: InChI=1S/C21H17F4NO3S2/c1-11-7-14(4-6-17(11)29-9-19(27)28)30-10-18-12(2)26-20(31-18)13-3-5-15(16(22)8-13)21(23,24)25/h3-8H,9-10H2,1-2H3,(H,27,28); Key:HWVNEWGKWRGSRK-UHFFFAOYSA-N

GW0742 (also known as GW610742 and fitorine) is a PPARδ/β agonist that has been investigated for drug use by GlaxoSmithKline.

== Pharmacology ==
=== Pharmacodynamics ===
It is mixed PPAR-B agonist antagonist depending on its dosage. It has weak activity on multiple nuclear receptors as well. It is antagonistic at androgen receptors and VDR. In silico modelling suggest that it has effects on thyroid hormone receptors.

== Chemistry ==
=== Derivatives ===
Multiple derivatives of GW0742 core structure have been developed. One of the compounds has the thiazole ring replaced with an oxazole ring inhibited VDR-meditated transcription with IC_{50} of 660 nM. Other novel analogues which are more potent than GWO742 with reduced toxicity have been developed as well.

== Research ==
GW0742 has been shown to ameliorate experimentally induced pancreatitis in mice. Additionally, it prevents hypertension in diet induced obese mice, has been investigated as potential antidiabetic drug, and has anti-inflammatory effects.

== See also ==
- GW501516
- Elafibranor
- Peroxisome proliferator-activated receptor
