= Seladelpar =

Chemical compound

Clinical data
- Pronunciation: /ˌsɛləˈdɛlpɑːr/ SEL-ə-DEL-par
- Trade names: Livdelzi, others
- Other names: MBX-8025; RWJ-800025
- AHFS/Drugs.com: Monograph
- MedlinePlus: a624062
- License data: US DailyMed: Seladelpar
- Routes of administration: By mouth
- ATC code: A05AX07 (WHO)

Legal status
- Legal status: CA: ℞-only; US: ℞-only; EU: Rx-only

Identifiers
- IUPAC name: 2-[4-[(2R)-2-ethoxy-3-[4-(trifluoromethyl)phenoxy]propyl]sulfanyl-2-methylphenoxy]acetic acid
- CAS Number: 851528-79-5
- PubChem CID: 11236126
- DrugBank: DB12390
- ChemSpider: 9411171
- UNII: 7C00L34NB9
- KEGG: D11256
- ChEMBL: ChEMBL230158
- CompTox Dashboard (EPA): DTXSID001045332

Chemical and physical data
- Formula: C_{21}H_{23}F_{3}O_{5}S
- Molar mass: 444.47 g·mol^{−1}
- 3D model (JSmol): Interactive image
- SMILES: CCO[C@H](COC1=CC=C(C=C1)C(F)(F)F)CSC2=CC(=C(C=C2)OCC(=O)O)C
- InChI: InChI=1S/C21H23F3O5S/c1-3-27-17(11-28-16-6-4-15(5-7-16)21(22,23)24)13-30-18-8-9-19(14(2)10-18)29-12-20(25)26/h4-10,17H,3,11-13H2,1-2H3,(H,25,26)/t17-/m1/s1; Key:JWHYSEDOYMYMNM-QGZVFWFLSA-N

Seladelpar, sold under the brand name Livdelzi, is a medication used for the treatment of primary biliary cholangitis. It is used as the lysine dihydrate salt. It is a peroxisome proliferator-activated receptor delta (PPARδ) receptor agonist. The compound was licensed from Janssen Pharmaceutica NV.

Seladelpar was approved for medical use in the United States in August 2024.

== Medical uses ==
Seladelpar is indicated for the treatment of primary biliary cholangitis in combination with ursodeoxycholic acid in adults who have an inadequate response to ursodeoxycholic acid, or as monotherapy in people unable to tolerate ursodeoxycholic acid.

Clinically, seladelpar reduces pruritus (itching) and interleukin-31 in people with primary biliary cholangitis.

== Society and culture ==
=== Legal status ===
Seladelpar was approved for medical use in the United States in August 2024. The FDA granted the application breakthrough therapy designation.

In December 2024, the Committee for Medicinal Products for Human Use of the European Medicines Agency (EMA) adopted a positive opinion, recommending the granting of a conditional marketing authorization for the medicinal product Seladelpar Gilead, intended for the treatment of primary biliary cholangitis. The applicant for this medicinal product is Gilead Sciences Ireland UC. Seladelpar was authorized for medical use in the European Union in February 2025. Seladelpar Gilead was renamed to Lyvdelzi.

The EMA granted seladelpar orphan medicine designation.

=== Names ===
Seladelpar is the international nonproprietary name.
