= Elafibranor =

Chemical compound

Clinical data
- Pronunciation: /ˌɛləˈfɪbrənɔːr/ EL-ə-FIB-rə-nor
- Trade names: Iqirvo
- Other names: GFT505, SureCN815512
- AHFS/Drugs.com: Monograph
- MedlinePlus: a624039
- License data: US DailyMed: Elafibranor
- Routes of administration: By mouth
- Drug class: Antihyperlipidemic
- ATC code: A05AX06 (WHO)

Legal status
- Legal status: AU: S4 (Prescription only); CA: ℞-only; US: ℞-only; EU: Rx-only

Identifiers
- IUPAC name: 2-[2,6 Dimethyl-4-[3-[4-(methylthio)phenyl]-3-oxo-1(E)-propenyl]phenoxyl]-2-methylpropanoic acid
- CAS Number: 923978-27-2
- PubChem CID: 9864881
- DrugBank: DB05187
- ChemSpider: 8040573
- UNII: 2J3H5C81A5
- KEGG: D11208
- ChEMBL: ChEMBL3707395
- PDB ligand: MUO (PDBe, RCSB PDB)
- CompTox Dashboard (EPA): DTXSID601045330

Chemical and physical data
- Formula: C_{22}H_{24}O_{4}S
- Molar mass: 384.49 g·mol^{−1}
- 3D model (JSmol): Interactive image
- SMILES: O=C(O)C(Oc1c(cc(cc1C)\C=C\C(=O)c2ccc(SC)cc2)C)(C)C
- InChI: InChI=1S/C22H24O4S/c1-14-12-16(13-15(2)20(14)26-22(3,4)21(24)25)6-11-19(23)17-7-9-18(27-5)10-8-17/h6-13H,1-5H3,(H,24,25)/b11-6+; Key:AFLFKFHDSCQHOL-IZZDOVSWSA-N

Elafibranor, sold under the brand name Iqirvo, is a medication used for the treatment of primary biliary cholangitis.

Elafibranor is a dual PPARα/δ agonist. Elafibranor and its main active metabolite GFT1007 are peroxisome proliferator-activated receptor (PPAR) agonists, both of which activate PPAR-alpha, PPAR-gamma, and PPAR-delta in vitro.

In June 2024, the US Food and Drug Administration (FDA) granted accelerated approval to elafibranor. The FDA considers it to be a first-in-class medication.

== Medical uses ==
Elafibranor is indicated for the treatment of primary biliary cholangitis in combination with ursodeoxycholic acid in adults who have an inadequate response to ursodeoxycholic acid, or as monotherapy in people unable to tolerate ursodeoxycholic acid.

== Adverse effects ==
The most common adverse reactions include weight gain, diarrhea, abdominal pain, nausea, vomiting, arthralgia, constipation, muscle injury, fracture, gastroesophageal reflux disease, dry mouth, weight loss, and rash.

== History ==
In 2019, the US Food and Drug Administration (FDA) granted elafibranor breakthrough therapy designation, based on phase II data, for the treatment of primary biliary cholangitis in adults 18 and older with inadequate response to ursodeoxycholic acid (UDCA). The designation was granted to Genfit.

In June 2024, the US FDA granted accelerated approval to elafibranor. The approval was based on positive phase III ELATIVE trial data. The designation was granted to Ipsen.

== Society and culture ==
=== Legal status ===
In July 2024, the Committee for Medicinal Products for Human Use (CHMP) of the European Medicines Agency adopted a positive opinion, recommending the granting of a conditional marketing authorization for the medicinal product Iqirvo, intended for the treatment of primary biliary cholangitis (PBC). The applicant for this medicinal product is Ipsen Pharma. Elafibranor was authorized for medical use in the European Union in September 2024.

In October 2024, the National Institute for Health and Care Excellence (NICE) adopted a recommendation for elafibranor for the treatment of adults with the primary biliary cholangitis based results from the phase 3 ELATIVE trial, in which 51% of patients receiving elafibranor in combination with ursodeoxycholic acid achieved a cholestasis response at week 52, compared to 4% of those in the placebo plus ursodeoxycholic acid group.

=== Names ===
Elafibranor is the international nonproprietary name.

Elafibranor is sold under the brand name Iqirvo.

== Research ==
Elafibranor is being studied and developed by Genfit for the treatment of endocrine and metabolic diseases such as type 2 diabetes, dyslipidemia, and metabolic dysfunction–associated steatohepatitis.
