= Peroxisome proliferator-activated receptor gamma =

Nuclear receptor protein found in humans

PPARG
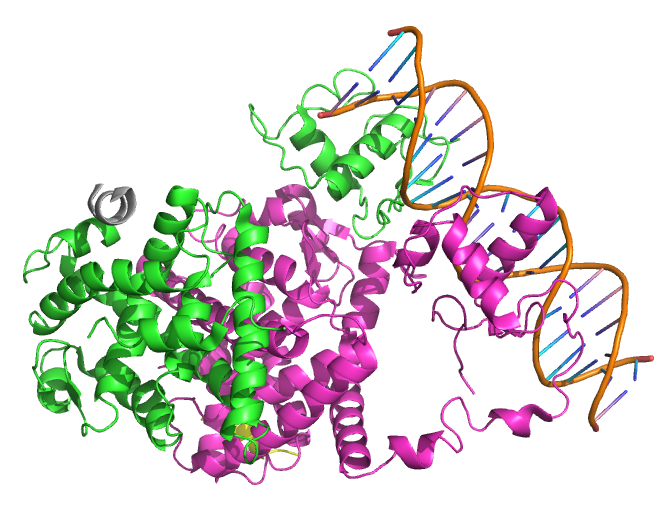

Identifiers
- Aliases: PPARG, CIMT1, GLM1, NR1C3, PPARG1, PPARG2, PPARgamma, peroxisome proliferator activated receptor gamma, PPARG5
- External IDs: OMIM: 601487; MGI: 97747; GeneCards: PPARG
Available structures
PDB	Ortholog search: PDBe RCSB
PDB	List of PDB id codes 1FM6, 1FM9, 1I7I, 1K74, 1KNU, 1NYX, 1PRG, 1RDT, 1WM0, 1ZEO, 1ZGY, 2ATH, 2F4B, 2FVJ, 2G0G, 2G0H, 2GTK, 2HFP, 2HWQ, 2HWR, 2I4J, 2I4P, 2I4Z, 2OM9, 2P4Y, 2POB, 2PRG, 2Q59, 2Q5P, 2Q5S, 2Q61, 2Q6R, 2Q6S, 2Q8S, 2QMV, 2VSR, 2VST, 2VV0, 2VV1, 2VV2, 2VV3, 2VV4, 2XKW, 2YFE, 2ZK0, 2ZK1, 2ZK2, 2ZK3, 2ZK4, 2ZK5, 2ZK6, 2ZNO, 2ZVT, 3ADS, 3ADT, 3ADU, 3ADV, 3ADW, 3ADX, 3AN3, 3AN4, 3B0Q, 3B0R, 3B1M, 3B3K, 3BC5, 3CDP, 3CDS, 3CS8, 3CWD, 3D6D, 3DZU, 3DZY, 3E00, 3ET0, 3ET3, 3FEJ, 3FUR, 3G9E, 3GBK, 3H0A, 3HO0, 3HOD, 3IA6, 3K8S, 3KMG, 3LMP, 3NOA, 3OSI, 3OSW, 3PBA, 3PO9, 3PRG, 3QT0, 3R5N, 3R8A, 3R8I, 3S9S, 3SZ1, 3T03, 3TY0, 3U9Q, 3V9T, 3V9V, 3V9Y, 3VJH, 3VJI, 3VN2, 3VSO, 3VSP, 3WJ4, 3WJ5, 3WMH, 3X1H, 3X1I, 4A4V, 4A4W, 4CI5, 4E4K, 4E4Q, 4EM9, 4EMA, 4F9M, 4FGY, 4HEE, 4JAZ, 4JL4, 4L96, 4L98, 4O8F, 4OJ4, 4PRG, 4PVU, 4PWL, 4R2U, 4R6S, 4XLD, 4R06, 4Y29, 4XTA, 4XUM, 4YT1, 4XUH, 5F9B, 5AZV

Gene location (Human)
Chr.	Chromosome 3 (human)
Band	3p25.2	Start	12,287,368 bp
Band	3p25.2	End	12,434,356 bp

Gene location (Mouse)
Chr.	Chromosome 6 (mouse)
Band	6 E3|6 53.41 cM	Start	115,337,912 bp
Band	6 E3|6 53.41 cM	End	115,467,360 bp
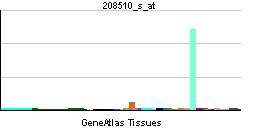
RNA expression pattern
Bgee	Human / Mouse (ortholog); Top expressed in: mucosa of transverse colon; subcutaneous adipose tissue; rectum; epithelium of colon; mucosa of sigmoid colon; right lung; testicle; urinary bladder; gonad; Achilles tendon / Top expressed in: brown adipose tissue; transitional epithelium of urinary bladder; white adipose tissue; mucous cell of stomach; subcutaneous adipose tissue; tunica adventitia of aorta; epithelium of stomach; pyloric antrum; secondary oocyte; mammary gland; More reference expression data
BioGPS	More reference expression data
Gene ontology
Molecular function	protein binding; alpha-actinin binding; chromatin binding; prostaglandin receptor activity; core promoter sequence-specific DNA binding; enzyme binding; protein phosphatase binding; metal ion binding; arachidonic acid binding; nuclear receptor coactivator activity; steroid hormone receptor activity; sequence-specific DNA binding; identical protein binding; nuclear receptor activity; DNA-binding transcription factor activity; DNA binding; double-stranded DNA binding; protein C-terminus binding; zinc ion binding; peptide binding; protein self-association; retinoid X receptor binding; protein heterodimerization activity; DNA binding domain binding; LBD domain binding; DNA-binding transcription factor activity, RNA polymerase II-specific; transcription factor binding; estrogen receptor binding; E-box binding; transcription cis-regulatory region binding; RNA polymerase II transcription regulatory region sequence-specific DNA binding; DNA-binding transcription repressor activity, RNA polymerase II-specific; fatty acid binding; lipid binding; signaling receptor activity
Cellular component	cytosol; RNA polymerase II transcription regulator complex; perinuclear region of cytoplasm; cytoplasm; nucleus; intracellular membrane-bounded organelle; nucleoplasm; protein-containing complex
Biological process	negative regulation of cell population proliferation; epithelial cell differentiation; negative regulation of smooth muscle cell proliferation; positive regulation of oligodendrocyte differentiation; transcription, DNA-templated; activation of cysteine-type endopeptidase activity involved in apoptotic process; response to lipid; placenta development; cellular response to vitamin E; negative regulation of interferon-gamma-mediated signaling pathway; negative regulation of sequestering of triglyceride; regulation of fat cell differentiation; cellular response to retinoic acid; glucose homeostasis; negative regulation of collagen biosynthetic process; cellular response to hyperoxia; response to estrogen; regulation of cholesterol transporter activity; regulation of circadian rhythm; negative regulation of telomerase activity; signal transduction; cellular response to insulin stimulus; monocyte differentiation; regulation of transcription by RNA polymerase II; regulation of blood pressure; positive regulation of apoptotic process; positive regulation of fat cell differentiation; negative regulation of cholesterol storage; regulation of transcription, DNA-templated; negative regulation of cell growth; negative regulation of transcription, DNA-templated; cellular response to prostaglandin stimulus; animal organ regeneration; positive regulation of DNA-binding transcription factor activity; lipoprotein transport; response to metformin; development of the heart; response to cold; negative regulation of acute inflammatory response; fatty acid oxidation; lipid homeostasis; transcription initiation from RNA polymerase II promoter; response to vitamin A; innate immune response; response to retinoic acid; cell maturation; cell fate commitment; peroxisome proliferator activated receptor signaling pathway; rhythmic process; response to mechanical stimulus; long-chain fatty acid transport; lipid metabolism; response to caffeine; positive regulation of fatty acid oxidation; response to immobilization stress; positive regulation of phagocytosis, engulfment; negative regulation of pancreatic stellate cell proliferation; response to starvation; response to organic cyclic compound; regulation of lipid metabolic process; steroid hormone mediated signaling pathway; response to organic substance; response to nutrient; cellular response to prostaglandin E stimulus; negative regulation of transcription by RNA polymerase II; white fat cell differentiation; negative regulation of macrophage derived foam cell differentiation; positive regulation of transcription by RNA polymerase II; G protein-coupled receptor signaling pathway; macrophage derived foam cell differentiation; positive regulation of DNA binding; positive regulation of transcription, DNA-templated; negative regulation of angiogenesis; negative regulation of blood vessel endothelial cell migration; pri-miRNA transcription by RNA polymerase II; negative regulation of gene silencing by miRNA; cellular response to low-density lipoprotein particle stimulus; positive regulation of vascular associated smooth muscle cell apoptotic process; negative regulation of vascular endothelial cell proliferation; negative regulation of vascular associated smooth muscle cell proliferation; fatty acid metabolic process; multicellular organism development; hormone-mediated signaling pathway; cell differentiation; intracellular receptor signaling pathway
Sources:Amigo / QuickGO
Orthologs
Databases	NCBI: entry; OMA: entry
Species	Human	Mouse
Entrez	5468	19016
Ensembl	ENSG00000132170	ENSMUSG00000000440
UniProt	P37231	P37238
RefSeq (mRNA)	NM_005037; NM_015869; NM_138711; NM_138712; NM_001330615 NM_001354666; NM_001354667; NM_001354668; NM_001354669; NM_001354670; NM_001374261; NM_001374262; NM_001374263; NM_001374264; NM_001374265; NM_001374266	NM_001127330; NM_011146; NM_001308352; NM_001308354
RefSeq (protein)	NP_001317544; NP_005028; NP_056953; NP_619725; NP_619726 NP_001341595; NP_001341596; NP_001341597; NP_001341598; NP_001341599; NP_001361190; NP_001361191; NP_001361192; NP_001361193; NP_001361194; NP_001361195	NP_001120802; NP_001295281; NP_001295283; NP_035276
Location (UCSC)	Chr 3: 12.29 – 12.43 Mb	Chr 6: 115.34 – 115.47 Mb
PubMed search
- Wikidata
View/Edit Human	View/Edit Mouse

Peroxisome proliferator-activated receptor gamma (PPAR-γ or PPARG), also known as the glitazone reverse insulin resistance receptor, or NR1C3 (nuclear receptor subfamily 1, group C, member 3) is a type II nuclear receptor functioning as a transcription factor that in humans is encoded by the PPARG gene.

== Tissue distribution ==
PPARG is mainly present in adipose tissue, colon and macrophages. Two isoforms of PPARG are detected in the human and in the mouse: PPAR-γ1 (found in nearly all tissues except muscle) and PPAR-γ2 (mostly found in adipose tissue and the intestine).

== Gene expression ==
This gene encodes a member of the peroxisome proliferator-activated receptor (PPAR) subfamily of nuclear receptors. PPARs form heterodimers with retinoid X receptors (RXRs) and these heterodimers regulate transcription of various genes. Three subtypes of PPARs are known: PPAR-alpha, PPAR-delta, and PPAR-gamma. The protein encoded by this gene is PPAR-gamma and is a regulator of adipocyte differentiation. Alternatively spliced transcript variants that encode different isoforms have been described.

The activity of PPARG can be regulated via phosphorylation through the MEK/ERK pathway. This modification decreases transcriptional activity of PPARG and leads to diabetic gene modifications, and results in insulin insensitivity. For example, the phosphorylation of serine 112 will inhibit PPARG function, and enhance adipogenic potential of fibroblasts.

== Function ==
PPARG regulates fatty acid storage and glucose metabolism. The genes activated by PPARG stimulate lipid uptake and adipogenesis by fat cells. PPARG knockout mice are devoid of adipose tissue, establishing PPARG as a master regulator of adipocyte differentiation.

PPARG increases insulin sensitivity by enhancing storage of fatty acids in fat cells (reducing lipotoxicity), by enhancing adiponectin release from fat cells, by inducing FGF21, and by enhancing nicotinic acid adenine dinucleotide phosphate production through upregulation of the CD38 enzyme in mice.

PPARG promotes anti-inflammatory M2 macrophage activation in mice.

Adiponectin induces ABCA1-mediated reverse cholesterol transport by activation of PPAR-γ and LXRα/β.

Many naturally occurring agents directly bind with and activate PPAR gamma. These agents include various polyunsaturated fatty acids like arachidonic acid and arachidonic acid metabolites such as certain members of the 5-hydroxyicosatetraenoic acid and 5-oxo-eicosatetraenoic acid family, e.g., 5-oxo-15(S)-HETE and 5-oxo-ETE or 15-hydroxyicosatetraenoic acid family including 15(S)-HETE, 15(R)-HETE, and 15(S)-HpETE, the phytocannabinoid tetrahydrocannabinol (THC), its metabolite THC-COOH, and its synthetic analog ajulemic acid (AJA). The activation of PPAR gamma by these and other ligands may be responsible for inhibiting the growth of cultured human breast, gastric, lung, prostate and other cancer cell lines.

During embryogenesis, PPARG first substantially expresses in the interscapular brown fat pad in mice. Depletion of PPARG in mice results in embryonic lethality at E10.5, due to the vascular anomalies in placenta, with no permeation of fetal blood vessels and dilation and rupture of maternal blood sinuses. The expression of PPARG can be detected in mouse placenta as early as E8.5 and through the remainder of gestation; in the human placenta, PPARG is mainly located in the primary trophoblast cell. PPARG is required for epithelial differentiation of trophoblast tissue in mice, which is critical for proper placenta vascularization. PPARG agonists inhibit extravillous cytotrophoblast invasion. PPARG is also required for the accumulation of lipid droplets by the placenta in mice.

== Interactions ==
Peroxisome proliferator-activated receptor gamma has been shown to interact with:

- Tetrahydrocannabivarin
- Cannabidiol
- Anandamide
- CD36
- EDF1
- EP300
- HDAC3
- NCOA4
- NR0B2
- PPARGC1A
- RB1.
- miR3666

== Research ==
PPAR-gamma agonists have been used in the treatment of hyperlipidaemia and hyperglycemia.

Many insulin sensitizing drugs (namely, the thiazolidinediones) used in the treatment of diabetes activate PPARG as a means to lower serum glucose without increasing pancreatic insulin secretion. Activation of PPARG is more effective for skeletal muscle insulin resistance than for insulin resistance of the liver.

PPAR-gamma inverse agonists such as FX-909 may have applications in the treatment of certain forms of cancer.

== See also ==
- Endocannabinoid system
- Endocannainoidome
