= List of agencies of the government of Gujarat =

Overview of government-owned establishments in Gujarat, India

Gujarat Government's Organisations

Government Organisations overview
- Jurisdiction: Gujarat
- Headquarters: Gandhinagar

Gujarat Government Organisations are the commercial and non-commercial establishments in the Indian state of Gujarat by Government of Gujarat or Government of India. This includes the state-run PSUs, Statutory corporations and co-operative societies. These commercial institutions are vital to the economic growth of this state.

Gujarat has 97 state public sector undertakings (PSUs). In 2018, 50 PSUs posted profits according to CAG report. 5 Gujarat PSUs make into Fortune India 500. In 2018, Seven Gujarat PSUs also make it to D&B's India's top 500.

== Preface ==
Public Sector Undertakings (PSUs) in Gujarat are established under different acts depending on their nature and purpose. Here are some of the important acts under which PSUs in Gujarat are established:

- Companies Act, 2013: Many PSUs in Gujarat are established under the Companies Act, 2013. This act provides for the incorporation, functioning, and regulation of companies in India. Companies like Gujarat State Fertilizers & Chemicals Limited (GSFC) and Gujarat State Petroleum Corporation Limited (GSPC) are established under this act.
- Gujarat State Financial Corporation Act, 1951: This act provides for the establishment of the Gujarat State Financial Corporation (GSFC), which provides financial assistance to small and medium-scale industries in the state.
- Gujarat Industrial Investment Corporation Act, 1972: This act provides for the establishment of the Gujarat Industrial Investment Corporation (GIIC), which provides financial and technical assistance to industrial units in the state.
- Gujarat Industrial Development Act, 1962: This act provides for the establishment of the Gujarat Industrial Development Corporation (GIDC), which is responsible for the development of industrial estates, providing infrastructure facilities to industries, and promoting industrial development in the state.
- Gujarat Mineral Development Corporation Act, 1961: This act provides for the establishment of the Gujarat Mineral Development Corporation (GMDC), which is responsible for the exploration, exploitation, and processing of minerals in the state.

== List of PSUs ==
Public Sector Undertakings (PSUs) are government owned establishments, which are established and owned by the Government of India or State governments of India. The public sector undertakings are established either by nationalisation or an executive order in case of union government and state government or act of parliament in case of union government and act of state legislature in case of state government with the purpose to earn profit for the government, control monopoly of the private sector entities, offer products & services at an affordable price to the citizens, implementation of government schemes and to deliver products & services to remote locations of the country.

List of Public Sector Undertakings by Sector:

=== Agriculture & Co-Operation Department ===
No.	Name of PSU	Headquarters City	Official Website
1	Gujarat State Land Development Corporation Limited	Gandhinagar	
2	Gujarat Agro Industries Corporation Limited	Gandhinagar	
3	Gujarat State Seeds Corporation Limited	Gandhinagar	
4	Gujarat Sheep & Wool Development Corporation Limited	Gandhinagar	

=== Energy & Petrochemicals Department ===
No.	Name of PSU	Headquarters	Official Website
5	Gujarat Power Corporation Limited	Gandhinagar	
6	Gujarat State Petroleum Corporation Limited	Gandhinagar	
7	GSPC LNG Limited	Gandhinagar	
8	GSPC (JPDA) Limited	Gandhinagar	
9	GSPC Pipavav Power Corporation Limited	Gandhinagar	
10	Gujarat State Petronet Limited	Gandhinagar	
11	GSPL India Gasnet Limited	Ahmedabad	
12	GSPL India Transco Limited	Ahmedabad	
13	Gujarat Urja Vikas Nigam Limited	Vadodara	
14	Gujarat State Electricity Corporation Limited	Vadodara	
15	Uttar Gujarat Vij Company Limited	Mehsana	
16	Dakshin Gujarat Vij Company Limited	Surat	
17	Paschim Gujarat Vij Company Limited	Rajkot	
18	Madhya Gujarat Vij Company Limited	Vadodara	
19	Gujarat State Energy Generation Company Limited	Vadodara	
20	Gujarat Energy Transmission Corporation Limited	Vadodara	
21	Bhavnagar Energy Company Limited	Bhavnagar	
22	Gujarat Info Petro Limited	Gandhinagar	
23	Gujarat Gas Company Limited	Vadodara	

=== Finance Department ===
No.	PSU	Headquarters City	Official Website
24	Gujarat State Financial Services Ltd	Gandhinagar	
25	Gujarat State Investments Ltd	Gandhinagar	

=== Food & Civil Supplies Department ===
No.	PSU	Headquarters city	Official website
26	Gujarat Civil Supplies Corporation Limited	Gandhinagar	

=== Forest and Environment Department ===
No.	PSU		Official website
27	Gujarat State Forest Development Corporation Limited	Vadodara	

=== Health & Family welfare Department ===
No.	Name of PSU	Headquarters City	Official Website
28	Gujarat Medicinal plant Board	Gandhinagar	
29	Gujarat Medical Service Corporation Limited	Gandhinagar	

=== Home Department ===
No.	Name of PSU	Headquarters City	Official Website
30	Gujarat State Police Housing Corporation Limited	Gandhinagar	

=== Industries & Mines Department ===
No.	Name of PSU	Headquarters City	Official Website
31	Alcock Ashdown(Gujarat) Limited	Bhavnagar	
32	Gujarat Mineral Development Corporation Limited	Ahmedabad	
33	Gujarat Industrial Investment Corporation Limited	Ahmedabad	
34	Tourism Corporation of Gujarat Limited	Gandhinagar	
35	Gujarat Handloom & Handicraft Development Corporation Ltd.	Ahmedabad	
36	Gujarat Rural Industrial Marketing Corporation Limited	Ahmedabad	
37	Gujarat Growth Centre Development Corporation Limited	Gandhinagar	
38	Infrastructure Finance Company of Gujarat Limited	Gandhinagar	
39	Gujarat Industrial & Technical Consultancy Limited	Ahmedabad	
40	Gujarat Industrial Corridor Corporation Limited	Gandhinagar	
41	Gujarat State Aviation Infrastructure Company Limited	Ahmedabad	
42	Dholera International Airport Company Limited	Gandhinagar	
43	Dahej SEZ Limited	Bharuch	
44	Gujarat Tour Development Corporation Limited	Gandhinagar	
45	Gujarat Pavitra Yatradham Vikas Board	Gandhinagar	
46	Narmada Clean Tech	Bharuch	
47	Sarigam Clean Initiative	Valsad	

=== Narmada Water Resources & Water Supply Kalpasar Department ===
No.	Name of PSU	Headquarters City	Official Website
48	Gujarat Water Resources Development Corporation Ltd.	Gandhinagar	
49	Sardar Sarovar Narmada Nigam Ltd.	Gandhinagar	
50	Gujarat Water Infrastructure Ltd.	Gandhinagar	

=== Panchayat Rural Housing & Rural Development Department ===
No.	Name of PSU	HQ City	Official Website
51	Gujarat State Rural Development Corporation Limited	Gandhinagar	
52	Gujarat Livelihood Promotion Company Limited	Gandhinagar	

=== Ports and Transport Department ===
No.	Name of PSU	Headquarters	Website
53	Gujarat Port Infrastructure & Development Company	Gandhinagar	
54	Gujarat State Road Transport Corporation	Ahmedabad	
55	Gandhinagar Railway and Urban Development Corporation Limited	Gandhinagar	
56	Gujarat Metro Rail Corporation Limited	Gandhinagar	

=== Roads and Buildings Department ===
No.	Name of PSU	Headquarters	Website
57	Gujarat State Road Development Corporation Limited	Gandhinagar	

=== Science and Technology Department ===
No.	Name of PSU	Headquarters City	Official Website
58	Gujarat Informatics Limited	Gandhinagar	
59	Gujarat ISP Services Limited	Gandhinagar	
60	Gujarat Fibre Grid Network Limited	Gandhinagar	
61	BISAG Satellite Communication	Gandhinagar	

=== Social Justice & Empowerment Department ===
No.	Name of PSU	Headquarters City	Official Website
62	Gujarat Minority Finance & Development Corporation Limited	Gandhinagar	
63	Gujarat Gopalak Vikas Nigam Limited	Gandhinagar	
64	Gujarat Thakor & Koli Vikas Nigam Limited	Gandhinagar	
65	Gujarat Safai Kamdar Vikas Nigam Limited	Gandhinagar	
66	Gujarat Vicharati & Vimukt Jati Vikas Nigam	Gandhinagar	
67	Dr. Ambedkar Antyoday Vikas Nigam	Gandhinagar	
68	Bin Anamat Varg Shixanik & Arthik Vikas Nigam	Gandhinagar	

=== Urban Development & Urban Housing Department ===
No.	Name of PSU	Headquarters City	Official Website
69	Gujarat Urban Development Company Limited	Gandhinagar	

=== Women and Child Development Department ===
No.	Name of PSU	Headquarters City	Official Website
70	Gujarat Women Economic Development Corporation Limited	Gandhinagar	

== List of statutory corporation ==
Statutory corporations are government establishments brought into existence by a Special Act of the Parliament. The Act defines its powers and functions, rules and regulations governing its employees and its relationship with government departments.

List of statutory corporation in Gujarat by sector:

=== Agriculture & Co-operation Department ===
No.	Name of Corporation	Headquarters City	Official Website
1	Gujarat State Warehousing Corporation	Gandhinagar	

=== Forest and Environment Department ===
No.	Name of Corporation	Headquarters City	Official Website
2	Gujarat Pollution Control Board	Gandhinagar	

=== Industries & Mines Department ===
No.	Name of Corporation	Headquarters	Official Website
3	Gujarat Industrial Development Corporation	Gandhinagar	
4	Gujarat State Financial Corporation	Ahmedabad	
5	Gujarat Infrastructure Development Board	Gandhinagar	
6	Gujarat State Khadi Gramodhyog Board	Ahmedabad	

=== Narmada Water Resources & Water Supply Kalpasar Department ===
No.	Name of Corporation	Headquarters City	Official Website
7	Gujarat Water Supply & Sewerage Board (GWSSB)	Gandhinagar	

=== Panchayat Rural Housing & Rural Development Department ===
No.	Name of Corporation	Headquarters City	Official Website
8	Gujarat Rural Housing Board	Gandhinagar	

=== Ports and Transport Department ===
No.	Name of Corporation	Headquarters City	Official Website
9	Gujarat Maritime Board	Gandhinagar	
10	Gujarat State Road Transport Corp.	Ahmedabad	

=== Social Justice & Empowerment Department ===
No.	Name of Corporation	Headquarters	Official Website
11	Gujarat Backward Class Development Corporation	Ahmedabad	
12	Gujarat State Schedule Castes Development Corporation	Gandhinagar	

=== Tribal Development Department ===
No.	Name of Corporation	Headquarters City	Official Website
13	Gujarat Tribal Development Corporation	Vadodara	

=== Urban Development & Urban Housing Department ===
No.	Name of Corporation	Headquarters City	Official Website
14	Gujarat Municipal Finance Board	Gandhinagar	
15	Gujarat Housing Board	Ahmedabad	

== List of joint-venture companies ==
List of joint-venture Government of Gujarat companies:

=== Agriculture & Co-Operation Department ===
No.	Company name	Headquarters	Official Website
1	Gromex Agri Equipment Limited	Vadodara	

=== Energy & Petrochemicals Department ===
No.	Company name	Headquarters	Official Website
2	Gujarat Industries Power Company Limited	Vadodara	
3	Gujarat State Fertilisers & Chemicals Limited	Vadodara	
4	Gujarat Narmada Valley Fertilisers Company Limited	Bharuch	
5	Sabarmati Gas Company Limited	Gandhinagar	
6	Gujarat Alkalies and Chemicals Limited	Vadodara	

=== Industries & Mines Department ===
No.	Company name	Headquarters City	Official Website
7	Gujarat Railway and Urban Development Company Limited	Gandhinagar	
8	Gujarat Rail Infrastructure Development Corporation Limited	Gandhinagar	

=== Science and Technology Department ===
No.	Company name	Headquarters City	Official Website
9	Creative Infocity Limited	Gandhinagar	

=== Urban Development & Urban Housing Department ===
No.	Company name	Headquarters City	Official Website
10	Gujarat International Finance Tec-City Company Limited	Gandhinagar	

=== Narmada Water Resources & Water Supply Kalpasar Department ===
No.	Company name	Headquarters	Official Website
11	Gujarat Green Revolution Company Limited	Vadodara	

== State government authorities ==
List of state government authorities:

=== Industries and Mines Department ===
No.	Name of Authority	Headquarters City	Official Website
1	Dholera Special Investment Regional Development Authority	Dholera	
2	Gujarat Chemical and Petrochemicals Special Investment Regional Development Authority	Ahmedabad	
3	Diamond Research and Mercantile City Limited	Surat	
4	International Financial Services Centres Authority (IFSCA)	GIFT City	
5	Mandal Becharaji Investment Regional Development Authority	Becharaji	

=== Urban Development ===
No.	Urban Development Authority	Headquarters City	Official Website
1	Gandhinagar Urban Development Authority	Gandhinagar	
2	Ahmedabad Urban Development Authority	Ahmedabad	
3	Vadodara Urban Development Authority	Vadodara	
4	Surat Urban Development Authority	Surat	
5	Rajkot Urban Development Authority	Rajkot	
6	Junagadh Urban Development Authority	Junagadh	
7	Bharuch-Ankaleshwar Urban Development Authority	Bharuch	
8	Gujarat International Finance Tech City Urban Dev. Auth.	Gandhinagar	
9	Morbi-Vankaner Urban Development Authority	Morbi	
10	Surendranagar-Dudharage-Vadhavan Urban Dev. Authority	Surendranagar	
11	Anand-Vallabh vidhyanagar-Karamsad Urban Dev. Authority	Anand	
12	Himmatnagar Urban Development Authority	Himmatnagar	
13	Navsari Urban Development Authority	Navsari	
14	Bardoli Urban Development Authority	Bardoli	
15	Khajod Urban Development Authority	Khajod	[115]

=== Area Development ===
No.	Area Development Authority	Headquarters City	Official Website
1	Bhavnagar Area Development Authority	Bhavnagar	
2	Jamnagar Area Development Authority	Jamnagar	
3	Bhuj Area Development Authority	Bhuj	
4	Anjar Area Development Authority	Anjar	
5	Bhachau Area Development Authority	Bhachau	
6	Rapar Area Development Authority	Rapar	N/A
7	Ambaji Area Development Authority	Ambaji	N/A
8	Alang Area Development Authority	Alang	N/A
9	Vadinar Area Development Authority	Vadinar	N/A
10	Khambhadiya Area Development Authority	Khambhadiya	N/A
11	Shamalaji Area Development Authority	Shamalaji	N/A
12	Khajod Area Development Authority	Khajod	N/A
13	Gandhidham Area Development Authority	Gandhidham	N/A
14	Bechraji Area Development Authority	Bahucharaji	N/A

== Defunct companies ==
List of Defunct companies:

Company name	Status
Gujarat Fisheries Dev. Corporation Ltd.	Non-Working
Gujarat Dairy Dev. Corporation Ltd.	Non-Working
Gujarat State Construction Co. Ltd.	Non-Working
Gujarat State Machine Tools Ltd.	Non-Working
Gujarat Trans-Receivers Ltd.	Non-Working
Gujarat Small Industries Corporation Ltd.	Under Liquidation
Gujarat Leather Industries Corporation Ltd.	Under Liquidation
Gujarat Communication & Electronics Ltd.	Under Liquidation
Gujarat State Textile Corporation	Under Liquidation
Gujarat Fintex Ltd.	Under Liquidation
Gujarat Siltex Ltd.	Under Liquidation
Gujarat Texfab Ltd.	Under Liquidation
GSFS Capital and Securities Ltd.	Non-Working
Naini Coal company Ltd.	Non-Working
* As per latest C& AG report of PSU

== See also ==
- List of agencies of the government of Tamil Nadu
- Public sector undertakings in Kerala
- Public sector undertakings in India
