= Economy of Gujarat =

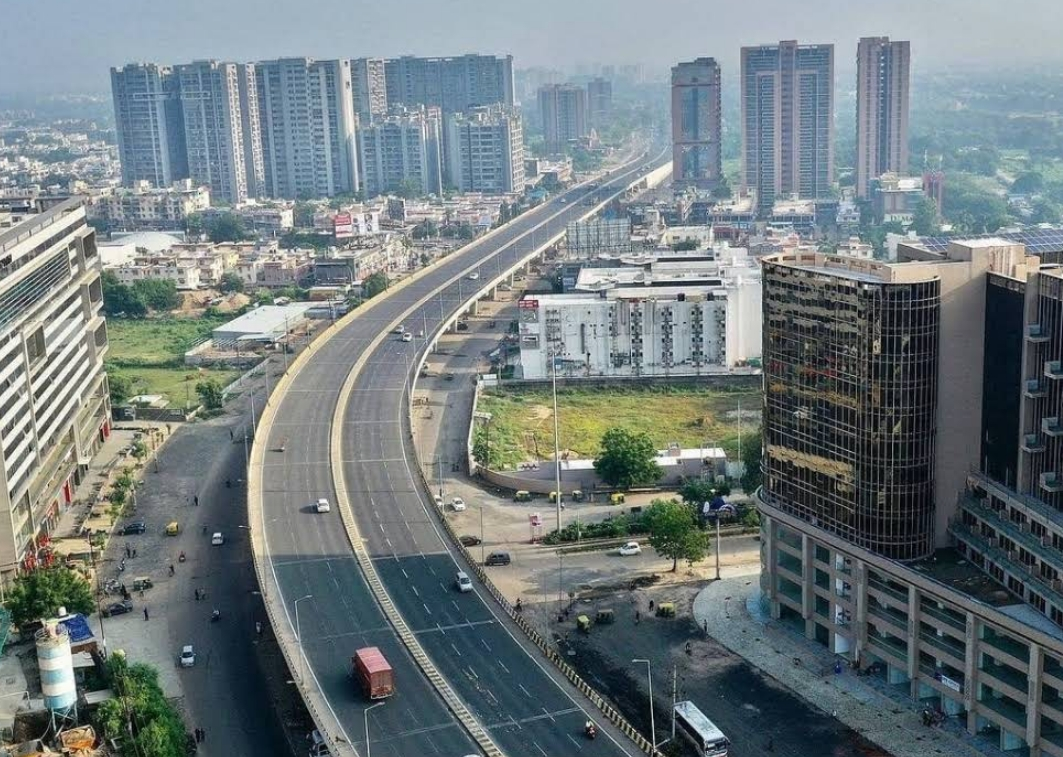
- Ahmedabad, the financial capital and largest city of Gujarat
- Currency: Indian Rupee ₹
- Fiscal year: 1 April – 31 March

Statistics
- Population: ▲73,062,000
- GDP: ▲₹33.25 trillion (US$350 billion) (nominal; 2026-27 est.)▲$1.61 trillion(PPP; 2026 est.)
- GDP rank: ▲4th (2025-26)
- GDP growth: 10.4% (2025-26)
- GDP per capita: ▲₹371,016 (US$3,900) (2024-25 est.) ▲$22,036 (PPP; 2026 est.)
- GDP per capita rank: 8th
- GDP by sector: Agriculture: 20% Industry: 44% Services: 36% (2022–23)
- Population below national poverty line: ▼9% in poverty (2025–26)
- Human Development Index: ▲0.737 high (2023) (23rd)
- Unemployment: ▼0.9% (2025)
- Main industries: Gems and jewellery; pharmaceuticals and biotechnology; Textiles and apparel; chemicals and specialty chemicals; Ceramics; Automobiles and electric vehicles; Engineering and industrial machinery; Machine tools and industrial tools; Auto parts and components; Steel and metal processing; Petrochemicals and petroleum refining; Plastics and polymers; Fertilizers and agrochemicals; Electrical engineering and electronics; Renewable energy and energy storage; Cement and construction materials; Food processing and dairy; Salt and marine chemicals; Oil and gas; Shipbuilding and marine engineering; Ship recycling; Logistics and port-based industries; Information technology and data centres

External
- Exports: $110.63 billion
- Export goods: Refined petroleum products; pearls, precious and semi-precious stones; iron and steel; biomedical products; chemicals; financial services
- FDI stock: $5.713 billion

Public finance
- Government debt: 15.27% of GSDP (2023–24 est.)
- Budget balance: ₹−44,930 crore (US$−4.7 billion) 1.8% of GSDP (2023–24 est.)
- Revenue: ₹2.25 lakh crore (US$23 billion)(2023–24 est.)
- Spending: ₹2.7 lakh crore (US$28 billion)(2023–24 est.)
- All values, unless otherwise stated, are in US dollars.

The economy of Gujarat, a state in western India, is the most industrialised in India, having the highest industrial output of any state in the union. It has the highest exports of any Indian state, accounting for 30.7% of all Indian exports in 2024-2025. It leads in diverse industrial sectors such as chemicals, petrochemicals, dairy, drugs and pharmaceuticals, cement and ceramics, gems and jewellery, textiles and engineering. It has the highest electricity production capacity and maritime port cargo volume among all states in India. It also has significant agricultural production with major agricultural produce of the state being cotton, groundnuts (peanuts), dates, sugar cane, milk and milk products. Gujarat recorded the lowest unemployment rate in India in 2022, with 4.4% of the labour force being unemployed.

Gujarat is ranked number one in the pharmaceutical industry in India, with a 33% share in drug manufacturing and 28% share in drug exports. The state has 130 USFDA certified drug manufacturing facilities. Ahmedabad and Vadodara are considered as pharmaceutical hubs as there are many big and small pharma companies established in these cities.

Gujarat has the longest coastline in India (1,600 km [990 mi]), and its ports (both private and public) handle around 40% of India's ocean cargo, with Mundra Port located in Gulf of Kutch being the largest port of India by cargo handled (144 million tons) due to its favorable location on the westernmost part of India and closeness to global shipping lanes. Gujarat also contributes around 20% share in India's industrial production and merchandise exports.

Gujarat's gross state domestic product (GSDP) increased to Rs. 25.68 lakh crore in fiscal year 2023–24, surpassing Uttar Pradesh's GSDP of Rs. 25.48 lakh crore (US$310 billion). In contrast, Tamil Nadu's GDP increased from Rs. 23.93 lakh crore to Rs. 27.22 lakh crore. While Karnataka GSDP falls behind UP GSDP and is Rs. 25.01 lakh crore. For fiscal year 2023-24 Gujarat became the third largest state economy in India.

== Contribution ==
The world's largest ship breaking yard is in Gujarat near Bhavnagar at Alang.

Reliance BP Mobility Limited, one of the group companies of Reliance Industries Limited founded by Dhirubhai Ambani operates the oil refinery at Jamnagar which is the world's largest grass roots refinery. The company has also planned another SEZ (special economic zone), in Jamnagar.

Legatum Institute's Global Prosperity Index 2012 recognised Gujarat as the highest-scoring among all states of India on matters of social capital.

== Data ==
Year (Note: Statistical Atlas of Gujarat Vol. II: Sectoral Profile, Bureau of Economics and Statistics.)	GSDP (in Bil. US$nominal)	GSDP per capita (in US$ nominal)	Growth rate	Inflation rate (in Percent)	Unemployment (in Percent)	Government debt (in % of GSDP)
2025	₹29.8 trillion (US$310 billion)	₹4.20 lakh (US$5,055)				
2024	₹25.63 trillion (US$270 billion)					
2023	₹22.62 trillion (US$230 billion)					15.88
2022	₹19.44 trillion (US$200 billion)				1.6	
2021	₹16.59 trillion (US$170 billion)					
2020	₹16.50 trillion (US$170 billion)	₹2.43 lakh (US$3,000)	10.65	4.7		
2019	₹15.03 trillion (US$160 billion)	₹2.25 lakh (US$2,800)	13.42	−0.8		
2018	₹13.29 trillion (US$140 billion)	₹1.99 lakh (US$2,500)	14.72	1.5		
2017	₹11.67 trillion (US$120 billion)	₹1.79 lakh (US$2,200)	13.72	5.6		
2016	₹10.29 trillion (US$110 billion)	₹1.60 lakh (US$2,000)	11.09	5.7		
2015	₹8.08 trillion (US$84 billion)	₹1.45 lakh (US$1,800)	13.75	6.4		
2014	₹7.24 trillion (US$75 billion)	₹1.29 lakh (US$1,600)	11.49			
2013	₹6.16 trillion (US$64 billion)	₹1.17 lakh (US$1,500)	19.10			
2012	₹455,295 crore (US$57 billion)	₹1.01 lakh (US$1,300)	17.69			
2011	₹365,295 crore (US$46 billion)	₹30,000 lakh (US$38 million)				
2010	₹330,671 crore (US$41 billion)					
2009	₹228,460 crore (US$29 billion)					
2008	₹213,092 crore (US$27 billion)					
2007	₹189,436 crore (US$24 billion)					
2006	₹6,547 crore (US$820 million)					
2005	₹153,079 crore (US$19 billion)					
2004	₹149,598 crore (US$19 billion)					
2003	₹122,500 crore (US$15 billion)					
2002	₹113,277 crore (US$14 billion)					
2001	₹104,494 crore (US$13 billion)					
2000	₹107,605 crore (US$13 billion)					
1999	₹105,443 crore (US$13 billion)					
1998	₹92,966 crore (US$12 billion)					
1997	₹86,414 crore (US$11 billion)					
1996	₹72,182 crore (US$9.0 billion)					
1995	₹63,624 crore (US$8.0 billion)					
1994	₹39,190 crore (US$4.9 billion)					
1993	₹35,018 crore (US$4.4 billion)					
1992	₹26,068 crore (US$2.7 billion)					
1991	₹24,120 crore (US$2.5 billion)					
1990	₹19,496 crore (US$2.0 billion)					
1989	₹19,496 crore (US$2.0 billion)					
1988	₹13,908 crore (US$1.4 billion)					
1987	₹14,022 crore (US$1.5 billion)					
1986	₹12,103 crore (US$1.3 billion)					
1985	₹11,740 crore (US$1.2 billion)					
1984	₹11,280 crore (US$1.2 billion)					
1983	₹8,675 crore (US$900 million)					
1982	₹8,205 crore (US$850 million)					
1981	₹6,547 crore (US$680 million)					
1980	₹2,795 crore (US$290 million)					
1979	₹2,924 crore (US$300 million)					
1978	₹2,745 crore (US$290 million)					
1977	₹2,597 crore (US$270 million)					
1976	₹2,439 crore (US$250 million)					
1975	₹1,898 crore (US$200 million)					
1974	₹1,898 crore (US$200 million)					
1973	₹2,202 crore (US$230 million)					
1972	₹2,256 crore (US$230 million)					
1971	₹1,150 crore (US$120 million)					
1970	₹997 crore (US$100 million)					
1969	₹906 crore (US$94 million)					
1968	₹974 crore (US$100 million)					
1967	₹889 crore (US$92 million)					
1966	₹868 crore (US$90 million)					
1965	₹935 crore (US$97 million)					
1964	₹859 crore (US$89 million)					
1963	₹806 crore (US$84 million)					
1962	₹812 crore (US$84 million)					
1961	₹738 crore (US$77 million)					

== Sectors ==
	Sector	GVA (Rupees in Lakh) at current prices		GVA (Rupees in Lakh) at 2011–12 prices	
	Sector	2019–20	% share	2019–20	% share
1	Primary Sector	27,617,048	19.37	18,973,486	17.39
1.1	Agriculture, forestry & fishing	22,282,348	15.63	14,245,950	13.06
1.11	Crops	13,956,699	9.79	8,962,827	8.21
1.12	Livestock	4,779,632	3.35	2,862,908	2.62
1.13	Forestry & logging	2,363,287	1.66	1,888,936	1.73
1.14	Fishing and aquaculture	1,182,730	0.83	531,280	0.49
1.2	Mining & quarrying	5,334,699	3.74	4,727,536	4.33
2	Secondary Sector	63,413,336	44.49	50,584,861	46.36
2.1	Manufacturing	51,064,957	35.82	40,892,857	37.48
2.2	Electricity, gas, water supply & other utility services	4,517,509	3.17	3,784,987	3.47
2.3	Construction	7,830,871	5.49	5,907,017	5.41
3	Tertairy Sector	51,512,119	36.14	39,549,816	36.25
3.1	Trade, repair, hotels and restaurants	18,051,035	12.66	14,616,582	13.40
3.11	Trade & repair services	18,051,035	12.66	14,616,582	13.40
3.2	Transport, storage, communication & services related to broadcasting	6,505,778	4.56	5,082,266	4.66
3.21	Railways	627,538	0.44	415,391	0.38
3.22	Services incidental to transport	3,851,614	2.70	3,281,339	3.01
3.26	Storage	79,223	0.06	52,051	0.05
3.27	Communication & services related to broadcasting	1,947,403	1.37	1,333,485	1.22
3.3	Financial services	7,646,745	5.36	6,273,832	5.75
3.4	Real estate, ownership of dwelling & professional services	8,470,228	5.94	5,926,791	5.43
3.5	Public administration & defence	5,010,315	3.51	3,617,774	3.32
3.6	Other services	5,828,016	4.09	4,032,571	3.70
	GVA at basic prices	142,542,503	100	109,108,163	100

=== Industrial ===
One of India's most industrialized states, Gujarat maintains a variety of industries, the principal ones being general and electrical engineering and the manufacture of textiles, vegetable oils, chemicals, soda ash, and cement. New industries include the production of fertilizers and petrochemicals. Major resources produced by the state include cotton, peanuts, dates, sugarcane, and petrol. The state is rich in calcite, gypsum, manganese, lignite, bauxite, limestone, agate, feldspar and quartz sand and successful mining of these minerals is done in their specified areas. Gujarat produces about 91% of India's required amount of soda ash and gives the country about 66% of its national requirement of salt. Chemical industries in Gujarat count for more than 35% of Indian chemical production.

In recent years, Gujarat has gained a prominent place in India's automobile industry, with several automobile plants being set up in the state: Suzuki Motor Gujarat in Hansalpur near Ahmedabad, Tata Motors and Ford India in Sanand, JSW MG Motor India, Hero Motocorp, JCB in Halol, Honda Motors and Scooters India in Vithalapur, etc.

It is one of India's most prosperous states, having a per-capita GDP significantly above India's average. Kalol Khambat and Ankleshwar are today known for their oil and natural gas production. Dhuvaran has a thermal power station, which uses coal, oil and gas. The Tarapur nuclear station in Maharashtra supplies the remaining power. Also on the Gulf of Khambat, 50 kilometers southeast of Bhavnagar, is the Alang Ship Recycling Yard (the world's largest). General Motors produces the ‘Astra’ car at Halol near Vadodara. Jalalpur is a large town of Gujarat, where several small and large textile industrial units have been established. Surat, a city by the Gulf of Khambat, is a hub of the global diamond trade.

During the period 1960–1990, Gujarat established itself as a leader in various industrial sectors including textiles, engineering, chemicals, petrochemicals, drugs and pharmaceuticals, dairy, cement and ceramics, and gems and jewellery. The post-liberalization period saw Gujarat's state domestic product (SDP) rising at an average growth rate of 14% per annum in real terms (from 1994 to 2002).

Ahmedabad, Vadodara, Ankleshwar and Vapi are the hub of chemical industries in the state, having number of manufacturing units (private as well as state owned) manufacturing dyes, specialty chemicals, agricultural chemicals, pesticides, pigments, colors, etc. Rajkot city is the hub of engineering manufacturing and has many companies manufacturing auto components, auto engines, CNC machines, forging & casting parts, etc. The state operating companies like GNFC, GSPC, GSFC, GMDC are a few among flagship companies of the state.

=== Engineering, machine tools and industrial machinery ===
Gujarat has a broad engineering-manufacturing ecosystem covering industrial machinery, machine tools, castings, forgings, bearings, pumps, electric motors, diesel engines, automotive components and other precision-engineering products. Rajkot is a major engineering and machine-tool cluster, with a large concentration of foundries, casting and forging units, auto-component manufacturers, machine-tool producers and machinery manufacturers. Ahmedabad and Vadodara provide additional engineering, electrical-equipment, industrial-machinery and heavy-engineering capacity.

The engineering sector is closely connected with Gujarat's automobile, chemicals, petrochemicals, ports, renewable-energy and manufacturing industries, creating opportunities for industrial equipment, process machinery, automation, precision components and export-oriented engineering goods.

=== Agriculture ===
Gujarat is the largest producer of major cash crops like cotton, groundnut, tobacco, cumin, sesamum, etc. in India. Other major crops produced are rice, wheat, jowar, bajra, maize, tur and gram. Gujarat has an agricultural economy the total crop area amounts to more than one-half of the total land area.

Animal husbandry and dairying have played a vital role in the rural economy of Gujarat. Dairy farming, primarily concerned with milk production, functions on a cooperative basis and has more than a million members. Gujarat is the largest processor of milk in India. Amul milk co-operative federation products are well known all over India and is Asia's biggest dairy. Among livestock raised are buffalo and other cattle, sheep, and goats. As per the results of livestock census 1997, there were 209.70 lakh livestock in Gujarat state. As per the estimates of the survey of major livestock products, during the year 2002–03 the Gujarat produced 6.09 million tonnes of milk, 385 million eggs and 2.71 million kg of wool. Gujarat also contributes inputs to industries like textiles, oil and soap.

Segment	National Share %
Cottonseed	98.0
Tapioca	44.4
Floriculture	16.5
Gooseberry	18
Coconut	29.1
Tamarind	25.3
Meat	7.5
Turmeric	14.6
Banana	19.4
Ragi	17.8
Horsegram	17.5
Sapota	17.4
Urd	14.7
Groundnut	14.2
Cucumber	12.6
Maize	12.3
Egg	12.2
Carrot	12.1
Marine fish	11.8
Gur	11.6
Water melon	11.4
Jackfruit	10.9
Jowar	10.6
Tea	8.5
Cocoa	8.2
Moong	7.9
Oilseed	7.7
Papaya	7.4
Paddy	6.9
Bean	6.7
Fruit and vegetable	6.3
Sugarcane	6.1
Mango	5.8
Bitter gourd	5.6
Pear	5.3
Sericulture and Apiculture	5.3

GUJARAT – PRODUCTION OF FOODGRAINS
Year	2021–22	2020–21	2019–20	2018–19	2017–18	2016–17	2015–16	2014–15	2013–14	2012–13	2011–12	2010–11	2009–10	2008–09	2007–08	2006–07	2005–06	2004–05
Rice (Thousand Tonnes)		2145.7	1983.1	1912.1	1890.9	1930.0	1702.0	1830.9	1636.0	1541.0	1790.0	1496.6	1292.0	1303.0	1474.0	1390.0	1298.0	1238.2
Wheat (Thousand Tonnes)		3259.5	3326.8	2407.4	3069.0	2737.0	2484.0	3059.0	4694.0	2944.0	4072.0	4019.5	2352.0	2593.0	3838.0	3000.0	2473.0	1805.5
Coarse Cereals (Thousand Tonnes)		1759.6	1786.3	1802.8	1782.2	1937.0	1549.7	1644.9	2120.6	1999.0	2232.3	2102.6	1600.0	1976.0	2151.0	1516.0	1836.0	1734.5
Pulses (Thousand Tonnes)																		
Total Fruits (Thousand Tonnes)																		
Total Vegetables (Thousand Tonnes)																		
Meat (Thousand Tonnes)																		
Milk (Thousand Tonnes)																		
Egg (Lakh Nos.)																		
Coarse Cereals (Lakh Tonnes)																		
Wool (Thousand Kgs)																		

=== Automobiles ===
Automobile Industry in Gujarat

Gujarat has been witnessing increasing investment both from Indian and foreign companies in recent times on account of its pro-business policies and this has augmented well for the engineering industry in Gujarat, which contributes to about 10% of the country’s total engineering output. The automotive sector in Gujarat is still at a relatively nascent stage, and contributes to about 5% of the country’s total automotive output Important players in the region include Asia Motor Works, Atul Auto, Munjal Auto India Ltd. and Electrotherm. Rajkot district is the largest cluster for the production of auto components and diesel engines in the state. Gujarat has offered several incentives to Suzuki Motors to set up an export-oriented unit for production and export of its popular models including the A-Star. The state would assist the company in setting up railway links from its production unit to Mundra Port.

After Tata Motors relocated the Nano manufacturing plant to Sanand, a small town near Ahmedabad, Gujarat has emerged as a car manufacturing hub. Major multinational automobile companies like Suzuki Motor, Honda, JSW MG Motor and Hero MotoCorp have plants in operation in Gujarat. Gujarat also leads in upcoming hybrid and electric vehicle manufacturing facilities. Suzuki, in partnership with Denso and Toshiba, is building a lithium-ion battery manufacturing facility at a cost of 1700 crore. Suzuki is planning to start manufacturing electric cars at their Gujarat plant from 2025. The India-based JSW Group has signed an agreement to invest Rs 4000 crore to promote manufacturing electric vehicles in the state, which includes vehicle manufacturing, production of batteries, and storage solutions. MG Motors, a subsidiary of China's largest automobile company SAIC Motors bought General Motors' manufacturing facility in Halol, Gujarat and started production in 2019. Tata Motors also produces electric cars from its Sanand plant.

Automotive Companies in Gujarat
Company name	Location	Products	Refs
Tata Motors	Chharodi, Sanand Taluka, Ahmedabad district	Tiago; Tigor; Tigor EV	
JSW MG Motor India	Halol	MG Hector; ZS EV; Astor; Gloster; Windsor	
Ashok Leyland	Alang	Trucks; Buses; Tippers	
Mahindra & Mahindra	Kandla	Tractors; Agricultural equipment; Utility vehicles	
Atul Auto	Shapar, Rajkot; Bavla, Ahmedabad	Atul Shakti; Gem; Rik; Smart	
Honda Motorcycle and Scooter India	Vithalapur, Mandal taluka, Ahmedabad		
Hero MotoCorp	Halol		
Suzuki Motor Gujarat	Hansalpur Becharaji, Mandal taluka, Ahmedabad district	Suzuki Baleno – 250,000 units/year; Suzuki Swift – 250,000 units/year; P Suzuki Dzire – 250,000 units/year; Powertrain plant – K12 petrol engine	
Triton EV	Bhuj, Kutch	Trucks	
Electrotherm	Ahmedabad		
Suzuki Motorcycle India	Vithalapur		
JSW Group			
Matter EV	Ahmedabad; Vadodara		
Wardwizard Innovations & Mobility	Vadodara		
Nissan – Renault	Vadodara	Engines	
DreamEV (Joy e-bike)	Vadodara		
Mahindra Gujarat	Vadodara		
TVS Motor Company	Sanand	Components	
JCB India	Halol		
Firefly Energy		Battery	
Reliance Industries	Jamnagar		

=== Banking and finance ===
Gujarat has an extensive banking networks in the country and the banking business in the state is well supported by the thriving trade, commerce and industries.

The country’s first international financial services centre (IFSC) at Gujarat International Finance-Tec City (GIFT City) in Gandhinagar, when American multinational IBM inaugurated the IBM Software Labs at GIFT-IFSC. Conceptualized a decade and half ago as an IFSC, the pace of growth, participation and investment at GIFT City has seen unprecedented growth in the past three years.

Institutions such as Bank of America, Standard Chartered Bank, Hongkong & Shanghai Bank Corporation Ltd, Citibank NA, Barclays Bank, Deutsche Bank, and JPMorgan Chase Bank National Association have set up IFSC Banking Units (IBUs) in GIFT city, Gujarat. By January 2021, the total banking transactions already reached $51 billion at GIFT IFSC. With GIFT City offering opportunities to foreign banks to book India-linked offshore businesses, more players are setting foot in Gujarat.

The following are the list of Banks based in Gujarat.

Indian Banks Based in Gujarat
Anchor Bank	Established	Headquarters	Refs
Bank of Baroda	1908	Vadodara, Gujarat	
Baroda Gujarat Gramin Bank	2019	Vadodara, Gujarat	
Saurashtra Gramin Bank	1978	Rajkot, Gujarat	
Gujarat Mercantile Co-operative Bank	1998	Ahmedabad, Gujarat	
Gujarat state co-operative bank	1961	Ahmedabad, Gujarat	
Gujarat Ambuja Co-op. Bank	1999	Ahmedabad, Gujarat	
Ahmadabad district co-operative bank	1922	Ahmedabad, Gujarat	
Rajkot Nagarik Sahakari Bank	1953	Rajkot, Gujarat	
Shri Rajkot District Co. Operative Bank	1959	Rajkot, Gujarat	
Foreign Banks
Anchor Bank		Place	Refs
MUFG Bank		GIFT City, Gujarat	
Mizuho Bank		GIFT City, Gujarat	
Standard Chartered		GIFT City, Gujarat	
HSBC		GIFT City, Gujarat	
Citibank NA		GIFT City, Gujarat	
Barclays Bank		GIFT City, Gujarat	
Deutsche Bank		GIFT City, Gujarat	
JPMorgan Chase Bank		GIFT City, Gujarat	
Bank of America		GIFT City, Gujarat	
KPMG		GIFT City, Gujarat	
New Development Bank		GIFT City, Gujarat	

=== Pharmaceuticals and chemicals ===
Gujarat is ranked number one in the pharmaceutical industry in India, with a 33% share in drug manufacturing and 28% share in drug exports. The state has 130 USFDA certified drug manufacturing facilities. Ahmedabad and Vadodara are considered as pharmaceutical hubs as there are many big and small pharma companies established in these cities.

=== Oil and gas ===
Gujarat is India's 'Oil Capital'. Gujarat accounts for 54% of India's onshore crude oil and 39% of onshore natural gas production. It accounts for approximately 46% of India's installed refining capacity and 60% of India's total crude oil import facilities. The government has announced his US$4.5 billion prospectus and his US$5.7 billion investment in Gujarat. Gujarat has a well-developed gas network of 550 km and with an investment worth US$500 million he plans to expand it to 2,200 km. Investments have been proposed and are underway to build new LNG terminals, in addition to the existing terminals at Dahej and Hazira. The state offers great opportunities across the energy value chain. Progressive and investor-friendly industrial policies, including tax rationalization, energy reforms and the development of special economic zones, coupled with logistical proximity to Middle East gas resources, are one of the key growth drivers for the sector.

The presence of cooperatives such as IIFCO, KRIBHCO, energy companies such as NTPC and GEB, and large industrial companies such as Reliance have created a vibrant energy sector in Gujarat. The Jamnagar Refinery is India's largest in terms of refining capacity and is also considered the largest grassroots refinery in the world. Gujarat has oil & gas reserves located at Ankleshwar, Mehsana, Tapti High, Hazira, Bharuch, Gandhar, Dahej, Jambussar, Palej, Kalol and isolated gas fields around Ahmadabad. In addition to this, it has discovered oil reserves in Dholka and Khambat.

=== Foundry ===
India has about 5,000 foundries and is the fourth largest producer of castings in the world, with an annual output of over 7.5 million tons. Indian foundries regularly meet the demands and expectations of the global market and currently export about 300,000 tons annually. Many Indian foundries have adopted the state-of-the-art technology, in all areas of manufacturing. India has a stable domestic demand, which has helped the foundries survive the recent global economic downturn. India remains a high growth region for small cars, tractors and two wheelers. The annual production of cars and SUVs is already above one million mark. The industrial growth has been impressive at 5–6%, in spite of the recessionary trends.

Of the many foundry centres in India, Gujarat has two leading clusters – Ahmedabad and Rajkot, each producing more than 40,000 tons/year. Ahmedabad has a number of small and medium size foundries, producing a variety of castings in Grey Iron, S.G. Iron, Steel and also Aluminum alloys. Rajkot engineering cluster produces a range of products such as castings, pump-sets, automobile components, diesel engine generating sets, bearings, machine tools and so on. In addition, a number of miscellaneous engineering items such as agricultural implements, hydraulic jacks, air compressors, fasteners and sobon are also manufactured in the cluster. The presence of Rajkot Engineering cluster in different engineering segments.

== Foreign trade ==
In the fiscal year 2021–22, Gujarat's merchandise exports hit a record level of over 12,700 crore INR (nearly $127 billion), the highest in the country. The major merchandise exports from Gujarat during the year 2021 were:

Year 2021
HS Code	Commodity	Value in INR	Number of countries to which state exports the products
27101944	Automotic Diesel Fuel, Not Containing Biodiesel, Confirming	₹3,24,74,39,67,917	31
27101949	High Flash High Speed Diesel Fuel Conforming to Standard IS	₹1,32,62,27,19,966	26
30049099	Other Medicine Put Up for Retail Sale N.E.S.	₹1,03,64,11,20,149	185
27101920	Aviation Turbine Fuel	₹1,02,56,48,07,316	18
71023910	Diamond (Other Than Industrial Diamond) Cut or Otherwise Worked B	₹94,93,11,73,935	44
27101241	Motor Gasoline Conforming to Standard IS 2796	₹94,09,24,39,643	12
29024300	P-Xylene	₹88,84,69,54,133	11
71131120	Silver Jewellery Set With Gems	₹82,72,43,59,508	19
69072100	Of a Water Absorption Coefficient By Weight Not Exceeding 0.	₹76,39,15,85,956	178
27101290	Other	₹62,96,47,51,455	

7 of the top 12 export districts of India are in Gujarat; Jamnagar and Surat leading the list.

Regular compilation of district-wise export data has been started from April 2021. India’s top 30 districts of exports along with top 5 exported commodities during the period April–September 2021–22 and the products/services identified with export potential are given below:

This information was given by the Minister of State in the Ministry of Commerce and Industry, Smt. Anupriya Patel, in a written reply in the Rajya Sabha.

Year 2021–2022				Future
Rank in India	Districts (States)	Top 5 Commodities	Value of Export (in US$ Million)	Products/Services Identified with Export Potential
1	Jamnagar (Gujarat)	1. Petroleum Products	19260.20	Jamnagari Bandhani, Brass Articles
1	Jamnagar (Gujarat)	2. Chemicals	1794.57	Jamnagari Bandhani, Brass Articles
1	Jamnagar (Gujarat)	3. Plastic and Linoleum	410.54	Jamnagari Bandhani, Brass Articles
1	Jamnagar (Gujarat)	4. Engineering Goods	218.68	Jamnagari Bandhani, Brass Articles
1	Jamnagar (Gujarat)	5. Mica, Coal and other ores, Minerals	116.59	Jamnagari Bandhani, Brass Articles
1	Jamnagar (Gujarat)	Total of top 5 commodities	21800.58	Jamnagari Bandhani, Brass Articles
1	Jamnagar (Gujarat)	Total export of District	22110.60	Jamnagari Bandhani, Brass Articles
2	Surat (Gujarat)	1. Gems and Jewellery	6872.54	Textiles, Bananas, Surat Zari Crafts, and Pomegranates
2	Surat (Gujarat)	2. Engineering Goods	1262.74	Textiles, Bananas, Surat Zari Crafts, and Pomegranates
2	Surat (Gujarat)	3. Yarn	336.75	Textiles, Bananas, Surat Zari Crafts, and Pomegranates
2	Surat (Gujarat)	4. Chemicals	255.52	Textiles, Bananas, Surat Zari Crafts, and Pomegranates
2	Surat (Gujarat)	5. Cotton yarn, handloom products, etc.	191.04	Textiles, Bananas, Surat Zari Crafts, and Pomegranates
2	Surat (Gujarat)	Total of top 5 commodities	8918.59	Textiles, Bananas, Surat Zari Crafts, and Pomegranates
2	Surat (Gujarat)	Total export of District	9693.91	Textiles, Bananas, Surat Zari Crafts, and Pomegranates
6	Bharuch (Gujarat)	1. Chemicals	2268.54	Chemicals, bananas
6	Bharuch (Gujarat)	2. Engineering Goods	810.39	Chemicals, bananas
6	Bharuch (Gujarat)	3. Plastic and Linoleum	570.46	Chemicals, bananas
6	Bharuch (Gujarat)	4. Drugs and Pharmaceuticals	406.06	Chemicals, bananas
6	Bharuch (Gujarat)	5. Cotton yarn, handloom products, etc.	108.01	Chemicals, bananas
6	Bharuch (Gujarat)	Total of top 5 commodities	4163.46	Chemicals, bananas
6	Bharuch (Gujarat)	Total export of District	4695.14	Chemicals, bananas
8	Ahmedabad (Gujarat)	1. Drugs and Pharmaceuticals	1218.54	Pharmaceuticals, textiles, engineering, and plastics
8	Ahmedabad (Gujarat)	2. Engineering Goods	1139.32	Pharmaceuticals, textiles, engineering, and plastics
8	Ahmedabad (Gujarat)	3. Cotton yarn, handloom products, etc.	418.41	Pharmaceuticals, textiles, engineering, and plastics
8	Ahmedabad (Gujarat)	4. Chemicals	259.31	Pharmaceuticals, textiles, engineering, and plastics
8	Ahmedabad (Gujarat)	5. Rice	247.95	Pharmaceuticals, textiles, engineering, and plastics
8	Ahmedabad (Gujarat)	Total of top 5 commodities	3283.53	Pharmaceuticals, textiles, engineering, and plastics
8	Ahmedabad (Gujarat)	Total export of District	4439.12	Pharmaceuticals, textiles, engineering, and plastics
10	Vadodara (Gujarat)	1. Engineering Goods	783.44	Pharmaceuticals, Engineering
10	Vadodara (Gujarat)	2. Chemicals	661.69	Pharmaceuticals, Engineering
10	Vadodara (Gujarat)	3. Drugs and Pharmaceuticals	320.65	Pharmaceuticals, Engineering
10	Vadodara (Gujarat)	4. Petroleum products	170.69	Pharmaceuticals, Engineering
10	Vadodara (Gujarat)	5. Plastic and Linoleum	127.52	Pharmaceuticals, Engineering
10	Vadodara (Gujarat)	Total of top 5 commodities	3263.99	Pharmaceuticals, Engineering
10	Vadodara (Gujarat)	Total export of District	3710.32	Pharmaceuticals, Engineering
11	Devbhumidwarka (Gujarat)	1. Petroleum products	3676.8	Marine and fisheries; petroleum
11	Devbhumidwarka (Gujarat)	2. Chemicals	4.79	Marine and fisheries; petroleum
11	Devbhumidwarka (Gujarat)	3. Marine products	2.97	Marine and fisheries; petroleum
11	Devbhumidwarka (Gujarat)	4. Engineering Goods	2.08	Marine and fisheries; petroleum
11	Devbhumidwarka (Gujarat)	5. Ceramic products and Glassware	0.92	Marine and fisheries; petroleum
11	Devbhumidwarka (Gujarat)	Total of top 5 commodities	3687.56	Marine and fisheries; petroleum
11	Devbhumidwarka (Gujarat)	Total export of District	3688.76	Marine and fisheries; petroleum
12	Kutch (Gujarat)	1. Engineering Goods	821.72	Mangos, Kutch embroidery, Kutch shawls, marine products, castor
12	Kutch (Gujarat)	2. Chemicals	477.16	Mangos, Kutch embroidery, Kutch shawls, marine products, castor
12	Kutch (Gujarat)	3. Rice	391.44	Mangos, Kutch embroidery, Kutch shawls, marine products, castor
12	Kutch (Gujarat)	4. Cotton yarn, handloom products, etc.	331.5	Mangos, Kutch embroidery, Kutch shawls, marine products, castor
12	Kutch (Gujarat)	5. Mica, Coal and other ores, minerals	191.56	Mangos, Kutch embroidery, Kutch shawls, marine products, castor
12	Kutch (Gujarat)	Total of top 5 commodities	2213.38	Mangos, Kutch embroidery, Kutch shawls, marine products, castor
12	Kutch (Gujarat)	Total export of District	3448.67	Mangos, Kutch embroidery, Kutch shawls, marine products, castor
23	Valsad (Gujarat)	1. Chemicals	643.9	Chemical and paper, mangos, marine products
23	Valsad (Gujarat)	2. Engineering Goods	297.87	Chemical and paper, mangos, marine products
23	Valsad (Gujarat)	3. Cotton yarn, handloom products, etc.	222.27	Chemical and paper, mangos, marine products
23	Valsad (Gujarat)	4. Plastic and Linoleum	177.37	Chemical and paper, mangos, marine products
23	Valsad (Gujarat)	5. Drugs and Pharmaceuticals	140.26	Chemical and paper, mangos, marine products
23	Valsad (Gujarat)	Total of top 5 commodities	1481.67	Chemical and paper, mangos, marine products
23	Valsad (Gujarat)	Total export of District	1970.23	Chemical and paper, mangos, marine products

== State government revenue and spending ==
Article 246 of the Indian Constitution, distributes legislative powers including taxation, between the Parliament of India and the State Legislature.

The constitution does not have provision for the central government and the States to have concurrent power of taxation. The tables below lists the thirteen taxes to be levied by the Central government and nineteen taxes by states including Gujarat.

=== Central government of India ===
SL. No.	Taxes as per Union List
82	Income tax: Taxes on income other than agricultural income.
83	Custom Duty: Duties of customs including export duties
84	Excise Duty: Duties of excise on the following goods manufactured or produced in India namely (a)Petroleum crude (b)high speed diesel (c)motor spirit (commonly known as petrol) (d)natural gas (e) aviation turbine fuel and (f)Tobacco and tobacco products
85	Corporation Tax
86	Taxes on capital value of assets, exclusive of agricultural land, of individuals and companies, taxes on capital of companies
87	Estate duty in respect of property other than agricultural land
88	Duties in respect of succession to property other than agricultural land
89	Terminal taxes on goods or passengers, carried by railway, sea or air; taxes on railway fares and freight.
90	Taxes other than stamp duties on transactions in stock exchanges and futures markets
92A	Taxes on sale or purchase of goods other than newspapers, where such sale or purchase takes place in the course of inter-State trade or commerce
92B	Taxes on the consignment of goods in the course of inter-State trade or commerce
97	All residuary types of taxes not listed in any of the three lists of Seventh Schedule of the Indian Constitution

=== State governments ===
SL. No.	Taxes as per State List
45	Land revenue, including the assessment and collection of revenue, the maintenance of land records, survey for revenue purposes and records of rights, and alienation of revenues etc.
46	Taxes on agricultural income
47	Duties in respect of succession to agricultural land.
48	Estate Duty in respect of agricultural land
49	Taxes on lands and buildings.
50	Taxes on mineral rights.
51	Duties of excise for following goods manufactured or produced within the State (i) alcoholic liquors for human consumption, and (ii) opium, Indian hemp and other narcotic drugs and narcotics.
53	Electricity Duty:Taxes on the consumption or sale of electricity
54	Taxes on sale of petroleum crude, high speed diesel, motor spirit (commonly known as petrol), Natural gas aviation turbine fuel and alcohol liquor for human consumption but not including sale in the course of inter state or commerce or sale in the source of international trade or commerce such goods.
56	Taxes on goods and passengers carried by roads or on inland waterways.
57	Taxes on vehicles suitable for use on roads.
58	Taxes on animals and boats.
59	Tolls.
60	Taxes on profession, trades, callings and employments.
61	Capitation taxes.
62	Taxes on entertainment and amusements to be extent levied and collected by a panchayat or Municipality or a regional council or a district council.
63	Stamp duty

=== Goods and Services Tax ===
The tax came into effect from 1 July 2017 through the implementation of the One Hundred and First Amendment of the Constitution of India by the Indian government. The GST replaced existing multiple taxes levied by the central and state governments.

It an indirect tax (or consumption tax) used on the supply of goods and services. It is a comprehensive, multistage, destination-based tax: comprehensive because it has subsumed almost all the indirect taxes except a few state taxes. Multi-staged as it is, the GST is imposed at every step in the production process, but is meant to be refunded to all parties in the various stages of production other than the final consumer and as a destination-based tax, it is collected from point of consumption and not point of origin like previous taxes.

== Economy of regions ==
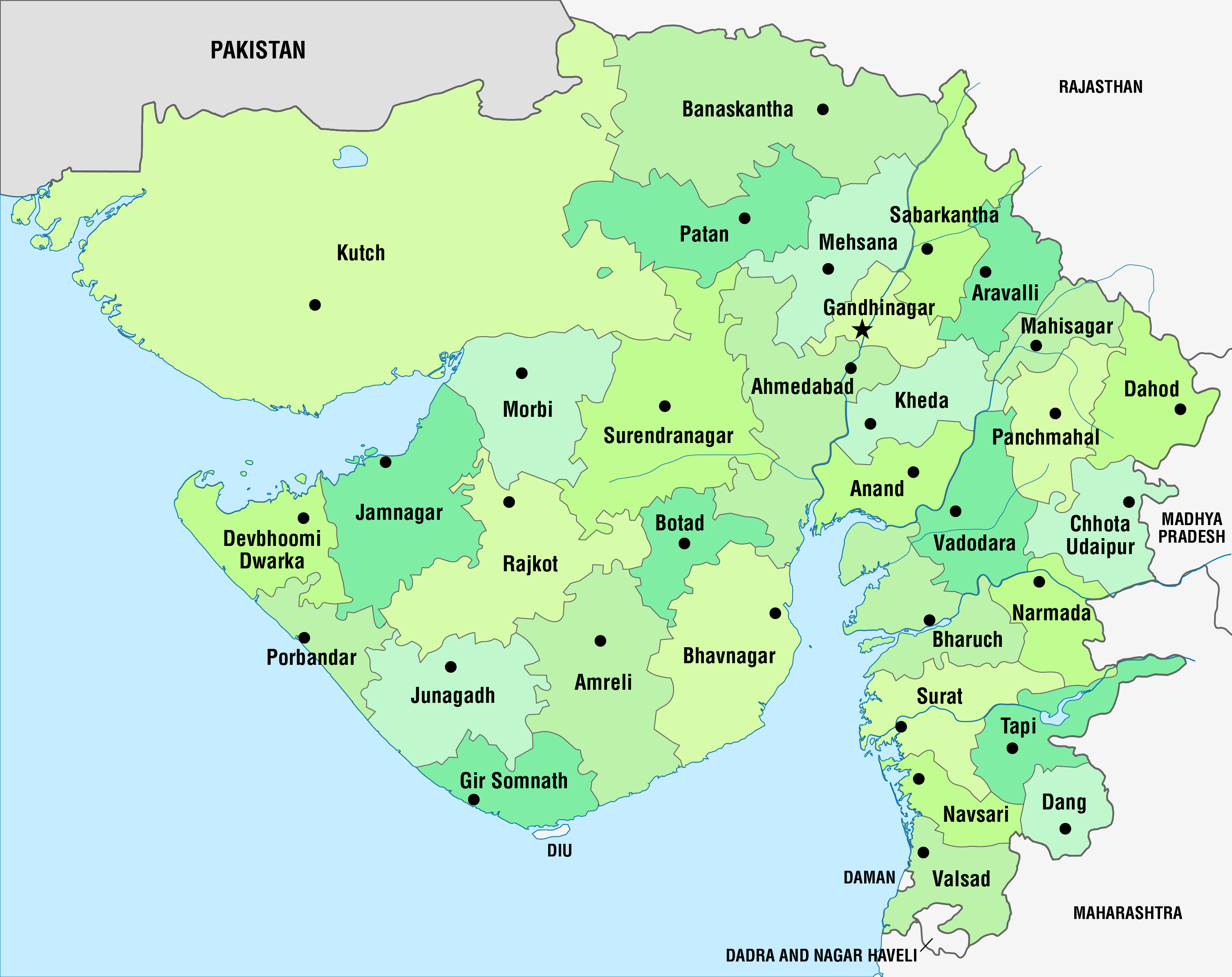
Districts of Gujarat, 2013

- Central Gujarat
  - Ahmedabad
  - Vadodara
  - Anand
  - Chhota Udaipur
  - Dahod
  - Kheda
  - Mahisagar
  - Panchmahal
- North Gujarat
  - Gandhinagar
  - Aravalli
  - Banaskantha
  - Mehsana
  - Patan
  - Sabarkantha
- Saurashtra – Kutch
  - Rajkot
  - Amreli
  - Bhavnagar
  - Botad
  - Devbhoomi Dwarka
  - Gir Somnath
  - Jamnagar
  - Junagadh
  - Morbi
  - Porbandar
  - Surendranagar
  - Kutch
- South Gujarat
  - Surat
  - Bharuch
  - Dang
  - Narmada
  - Navsari
  - Tapi
  - Valsad

Year			2021				2011			
	City	Area	Population	GDP	GDP per Capita	Literacy	Population	GDP	GDP per Capita	Literacy
01.	Ahmedabad	505.00	8,253,000	$68 billion			6,357,693			92.30
02.	Surat	474.185	6,936,534	$59.9 billion			4,645,384			
03.	Vadodara	454.33	5,240,522				3,041,791			
04.	Rajkot	160	1,934,000				1,390,640			
05.	Bhavnagar	108.27	712,000				605,882			
06.	Jamnagar	125.67	711,000				600,934			
07.	Gandhinagar	326.00	410,323				206,167			
08.	Junagadh	57.16	407,000				319,462			
09.	Gandhidham	63.49	406,000				247,992			
10.	Anand	47.89	385,291				288,092			
11.	Navsari	43.716	367,322				292,719			
12.	Morbi	46.58	360,001				251,859			
13.	Nadiad	45.16	330,400				225,071			
14.	Surendranagar	58.60	298,692				253,606			
15.	Bharuch	43.80	288,244				223,647			
16.	Mehsana	31.76	257,043				190,753			
17.	Bhuj	39.79	251,489				219,514			
18.	Porbandar	50.48	243,584				217,203			
19.	Palanpur	39.50	242,936				141,532			
20.	Valsad	24.10	231,756				170,060			
21.	Vapi	31.35	230,598				163,630			
22.	Gondal	74.48	189,797				173,353			
23.	Veraval	39.95	185,797				156,696			
24.	Godhra	20.16	173,014				143,644			
25.	Patan	17.82	171,614				133,744			
26.	Kalol	25.42	171,395				133,737			
27.	Dahod	14.00	159,326				130,505			
28.	Botad	10.36	158,985				130,327			
29.	Amreli	65.00	146,014				117,967			
30.	Deesa	20.81	135,869				111,160			
31.	Jetpur	36.00	129,653				118,302			

== Energy ==
Energy is an essential building block in the economic development of Gujarat. In an effort to meet the demands of rapid industrialization, the energy sector of Gujarat has undergone significant growth in past few years. Areas like resource exploration, capacity additions and sectoral reforms have been revolutionized. The energy sector can be categorized primarily into power, oil, and gas. The power sector includes generation, transmission and distribution of electricity. The power sector has grown considerably over the years and is able to support infrastructure development in the state. As far as the oil and gas sectors are concerned, the state has major contribution in areas of exploration and production, LNG terminal infrastructure, pipeline networks, refining, petroleum marketing, and city gas distribution.

=== Electricity ===
Electricity generation for the state of Gujarat is handled by the Gujarat State Electricity Corporation Limited. The major distributors of electricity in Gujarat are Uttar Gujarat Vij Company Ltd., Dakshin Gujarat Vij Company Ltd., Paschim Gujarat Vij Company Ltd. and Madhya Gujarat Vij Company Ltd. These institutions are subsidiaries of Guvnl with the transmission of electricity of handled by Gujarat Energy Transmission Corporation Limited.

=== Installed capacity ===
The total installed capacity of Gujarat is 42208 megawatts (MW). Most of the electricity in Gujarat is generated through coal. Hydropower is the second largest means of producing electricity in the state. Gujarat also has significant installed capacities of Natural Gas, Renewables and Nuclear power plants. As of 2021–22, the share of electricity generated through coal stands at 16302 MW with a percentage share of 40 percent. The share of hydropower is at 41 percentage with a capacity of 16588 MW. The contribution of natural gas stands at 16 percent with a capacity of 6587 MW. The installed capacity of renewable energy is 2 percent with a capacity of 772 MW. Finally, 559 MW is capacitated by Nuclear power having a share of 1 percentage.

==== Renewable energy ====
As of March 31, 2022 the installed capacity of the renewable energy sources of Gujarat is 13578 MW. The installed capacity of wind energy stands at 6662 MW, Solar energy has an installed capacity of 6717 MW and other Renewable sources stand at 199 MW.

The locations of major solar parks in Gujarat have been mentioned in the Solar power in Gujarat page.

=== Nuclear energy ===
Currently, the state of Gujarat has an installed nuclear power capacity of 559 MW. The only nuclear power plant in Gujarat is the Kakrapar Atomic Power Station.

The two existing units at the Kakrapar atomic power station feature pressurised heavy water reactors (PHWR) of 220MW capacity each. As of May 2020, unit one of the Kakrapar atomic power station generated 30,683 million units of electricity while unit two produced 32,442 million units

== Tourism ==
India's first world heritage city, Ahmedabad, is in Gujarat. Gujarat is the sixth largest state in India, located in the western part of India, with a coastline of 1,600 km (990 mi), which is the largest in India. It is one of the most popular states in the country, with an annual footfall of 19.81 million tourists in the fiscal years 2010–11. Gujarat offers scenic beauty from Great Rann of Kutch to the hills of Saputara. It is the world's only home of pure Asiatic lions.

During the Sultanate reign, Hindu craftsmanship mixed with Islamic architecture and gothic style to give rise to the Indo-Saracenic style. Many structures in the state are built in this fashion.

It is also the birthplace of Mahatma Gandhi and Sardar Vallabhbhai Patel, the great iconic figures of India's Independence movement.

Amitabh Bachchan is currently the brand ambassador of Gujarat Tourism. The ‘Khushboo Gujarat Ki' campaign by Amitabh Bachchan has grown tourism in Gujarat by 14 per cent, twice the national growth rate.

The Statue of Unity has emerged as a major tourist destination in Gujarat. It attracted average 15,036 visitors in the month of November, 2019.

== See also ==
- List of companies in Gujarat
