= List of electricity organisations in India =

This is a list of electricity-industry related organisations based in India.

== Under central government ==
=== Regulatory bodies ===
- Central Electricity Authority
- Central Electricity Regulatory Commission
- Bureau of Energy Efficiency

=== Central public sector units ===
- Nuclear Power Corporation of India
- PowerGrid Corporation of India
- NHPC Limited
- NTPC Limited
- Power System Operation Corporation
- Neyveli Lignite Corporation
- Damodar Valley Corporation

== Under state governments ==
=== Andhra Pradesh ===
- Andhra Pradesh Power Generation Corporation
- Andhra Pradesh Eastern Power Distribution Company Limited
- Andhra Pradesh Central Power Distribution Company Limited
- Andhra Pradesh Southern Power Distribution Company Limited
- Transmission Corporation of Andhra Pradesh

=== Assam ===
- Assam State Electricity Board

=== Bihar ===
- Bihar State Power Holding Company Limited
- North Bihar Power Distribution Company Limited
- South Bihar Power Distribution Company Limited

=== Chhattisgarh ===
- Chhattisgarh State Power Generation Company Limited

=== Gujarat ===
- Dakshin Gujarat Vij Company Ltd.
- Gujarat Urja Vikas Nigam Ltd.
- Madhya Gujarat Vij Company Ltd.
- Paschim Gujarat Vij Company Ltd.
- Gujarat State Electricity Corporation Ltd.
- Gujarat Electricity Corporation Ltd.
- Uttar Gujarat Vij Company Ltd.

=== Haryana ===
- Dakshin Haryana Bijli Vitran Nigam
- Uttar Haryana Bijli Vitran Nigam
- Haryana Vidyut Prasaran Nigam Limited
- Haryana Power Generation Corporation

=== Delhi ===
- Delhi Electricity Regulatory Commission
- Delhi Transco Limited
- BRPL
- BYPL
- TPDDL
- IPGCL
- PPCL

=== Jharkhand ===
- Jharkhand State Electricity Board
- Jharkhand Bijli Vitran Nigam Limited

=== Karnataka ===
- Karnataka Power Corporation Limited (KPCL)
- Karnataka Power Transmission Corporation Limited (KPTCL)
- MESCOM, Mangaluru
- CESC, Mysuru
- BESCOM, Bengaluru
- HESCOM, Hubballi
- GESCOM, Kalaburagi

=== Kerala ===
- Kerala State Electricity Board

=== Madhya Pradesh ===
- Madhya Pradesh Power Generation Company Limited
- Madhya Pradesh Power Transmission Company Limited
- Madhya Pradesh Poorv Kshetra Vidyut Company Limited
- Madhya Pradesh Madhya Kshetra Vidyut Vitaran Company Limited
- Madhya Pradesh Paschim Kshetra Vidyut Vitaran Company Limited
- Madhya Pradesh Power Management Company Limited
- Madhya Pradesh Electricity Regulatory Commission

=== Maharashtra ===
- Maharashtra State Electricity Board
- Maharashtra State Electricity Distribution Company Limited
- Maharashtra State Electricity Transmission Company Limited
- Maharashtra State Power Generation Company Limited

=== Rajasthan ===
- Rajasthan Rajya Vidyut Utpadan Nigam
- Rajasthan Rajya Vidyut Prasaran Nigam Limited

=== Uttar Pradesh ===
- Uttar Pradesh Rajya Vidyut Utpadan Nigam (UPRVUN)
- Uttar Pradesh Rajya Vidyut Utpadan Nigam Limited (UPRVUNL)
- Uttar Pradesh Power Corporation Limited (UPPCL)
- UP Power Transmission Corporation Limited (UPPTCL)
- UP Jal Vidyut Nigam Limited (UPJVNL)

=== Uttarakhand ===
- Uttarakhand Power Corporation Limited

=== West Bengal ===
- West Bengal Power Development Corporation Limited
- West Bengal State Electricity Transmission Company
- West Bengal State Electricity Distribution Company Limited
- CESC Limited

=== Odisha ===
- Odisha Hydro Power Corporation
- Odisha Power Generation Corporation
- Odisha Electricity Regulatory Commission
- Central Electricity Supply Utility of Odisha
- Western Electricity Supply Company of Odisha
- Odisha Power Transmission Corporation Limited
- TP Northern Odisha Distribution Limited (TPNODL)

=== Tamil Nadu ===
- TNEB Limited
- Tamil Nadu Power Generation Corporation Limited
- Tamil Nadu Power Distribution Corporation Limited
- Tamil Nadu Transmission Corporation Limited
- Tamil Nadu Green Energy Corporation Limited
- Tamil Nadu Electrical Licensing Board
- Tamil Nadu Electricity Regulatory Commission
- Tamil Nadu Electrical Inspectorate

=== Telangana ===
- Telangana Power Generation Corporation
- Transmission Corporation of Telangana
- Telangana Northern Power Distribution Company Limited
- Telangana Southern Power Distribution Company Limited

=== Punjab ===
- Punjab State Power Corporation Limited
- Punjab State Power Transmission Corporation Limited

== See also ==
- Off-the-grid
