= Economy of Ahmedabad =

- Currency: Indian rupee (INR, ₹)
- Fiscal year: 1 April – 31 March

Statistics
- Population: 5,577,940
- GDP: $136.1 billion (PPP) (2023)
- Main industries: Textiles & Apparel; Chemicals & Pharmaceuticals; IT & ITES; Gems & Jewelry
- All values, unless otherwise stated, are in US dollars. All values, unless otherwise stated, are in US dollars.

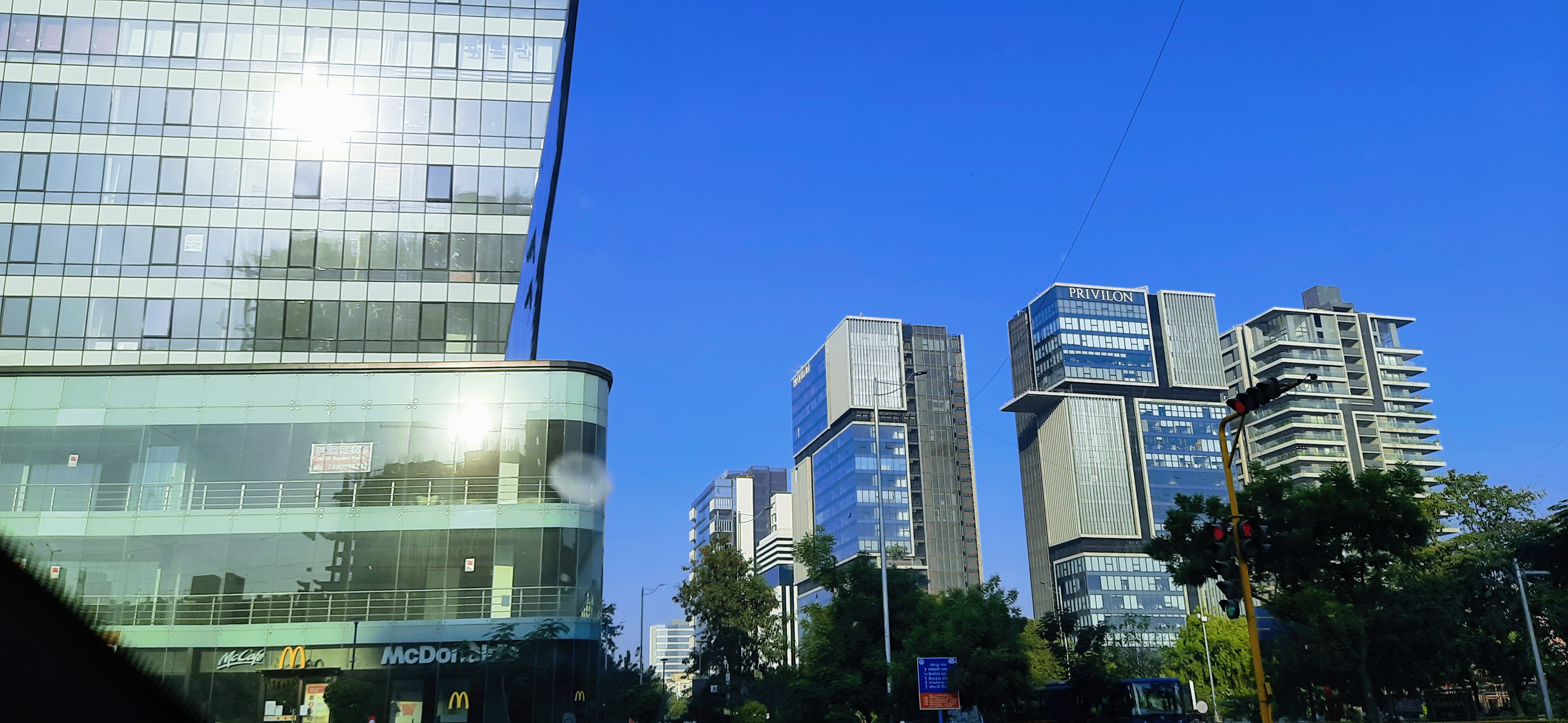
Skyline of SG Highway

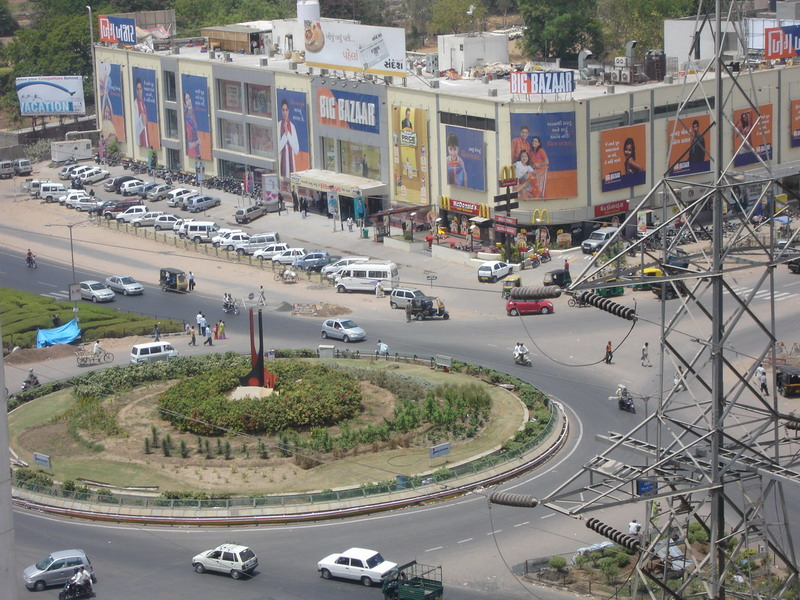
A retail mall on the Sarkhej-Gandhinagar Highway

Ahmedabad is the industrial center in western India after Mumbai. The gross domestic product of Ahmedabad metro was estimated at US$136.1 billion in 2023. Ahmedabad is the largest contributor to the GDP of Gujarat state, with an estimated US$68 billion as of 2017 out of $227 billion, textile and clothing in Ahmedabad is one of the oldest industries. It is the largest supplier of denim and one of the largest exporters of gems and jewellery in the country. Ahmedabad has one of the largest concentration of pharmaceutical and biotech companies in India. Ahmedabad hosts the headquarters of major public-sector banks Ahmedabad Dist Co Op Bank, Ahd Mercantile Co-Op Bank Ltd, Ahmedabad Mercantil Co Op Bank, Dena Bank, The Cosmos Co - Op Bank, Manager Gujarat Ambuja Co-Operative, The Gujarat State Co-operative Bank Ltd.Gujarat State Coop Bank, The Kalupur Bank, Ahmedabad Capital Bank, Kutch Bank co op, Bank of Rajasthan, Bank of Marwad.

The textile industry has been the main industry of Ahmedabad. On 30 May 1861, Ranchhodlal Chhotalal founded the first Indian textile mill called the Ahmedabad Spinning and Weaving Company Limited, to be more popularly known as the Shahpur Mill later on. This was followed with a series of textile mills like the Calico Mills in 1880 by Maganbhai, and other mills founded by industrialists like Ambalal Sarabhai and Kasturbhai Lalbhai which gave Ahmedabad the title of Manchester of India. The textile industry saw a decline in the early part of the 20th century, but was revived again due to the First World War and also by the Swadeshi movement led by Mahatma Gandhi during the independence movement. Arvind Mills is one of the largest textile mills in the country. An Arvind mill is one of the three largest producers of denim in the world. Dirubhai Ambani started his the first textile mill at Naroda in February, 1966.

Ahmedabad's GDP was US$64 billion in 2014. Ahmedabad also has a thriving chemicals and pharmaceuticals industry. Two of the biggest pharmaceutical companies of India - Zydus Cadila and Torrent Pharmaceuticals are located in the city. The city also serves as the corporate headquarters of the Adani Group which is a leading trading and export company of India. The Nirma group of industries running many detergent and chemical industrial units in Gujarat, also has its corporate headquarters in the city.

The last few years has seen the rise of the Information Technology industry in Ahmedabad. A Nasscom survey in 2002 on the ‘Super Nine Indian Destinations’ for IT-enabled services (ITES) had ranked Ahmedabad fifth among the top nine most competitive cities in the country.

== Companies ==
Company	Revenue (USD billion)	Industry
Adani Enterprises	7.86	Consumer Goods
Adani Green Energy	0.41	Renewable energy
Adani Power	4.00	Energy
Adani Transmission	1.40	Electric utility
Adani Ports	2.30	Shipping
Torrent Group		
Torrent Power		
Torrent Pharmaceuticals	1.10	Pharmaceuticals
Zydus Lifesciences	1.90	Pharmaceuticals
Gujarat Gas	1.30	Oil and gas
Gujarat Mineral	0.34	Mining
Gujarat State Petroleum	2.30	Oil and gas
Reliance Petroleum	102.95	Oil and gas
Sadbhav Engineering	0.20	Infrastructure
Torrent Power	1.80	Energy
Cadila Pharmaceuticals		Pharmaceuticals
CineMan Productions		
Reliance Petroleum		
Arvind (company)		
Atul (company)		
Suzuki Motor Gujarat		
Vadilal		
NeeRain		Water Management

== See also ==
- Gujarat
- Economy of Gujarat
