= The Post-Pandemic World Order =

2020 book by Sitakanta Mishra

The Post-Pandemic World Order: Nine Pointers
- Author: Sitakanta Mishra
- Language: English
- Subject: Geopolitics
- Genre: Nonfiction
- Published: 2020
- Publisher: IndraStra Papers, Bibliotheca Alexandrina
- Publication place: India
- Media type: Paperback
- Pages: 56
- ISBN: 979-863-674167-1

The Post-Pandemic World Order: Nine Pointers is a nonfiction academic book by Sitakanta Mishra, a professor of international relations at Pandit Deendayal Energy University.

== Background ==
The book was published under open access principles and deals with the future geopolitical scenarios in the post-pandemic world.

== Reception ==
Writing for the Nepal Institute for International Cooperation and Engagement, Aradhana Talwar writes, "Political shifts will inevitably have implications for security variables, wherein the author reminds that the nuclear race is also viewed within the framework of biological warfare, which has been brought to light in the present pandemic and the conspiracy theories surrounding it."

=== Translations ===
In 2021, the book was translated into Egyptian Arabic by Bibliotheca Alexandrina.
