= GETCO =

GETCO may refer to:

- Global Electronic Trading Company, an electronic trading firm now merged into KCG Holdings
- Gujarat Energy Transmission Corporation, an electrical power company in Gujarat, India
