= Hazira Port =

- Interactive map of Hazira Port
- Location in India Gujarat#India Hazira Port (India)

Location
- Country: India
- Location: Hazira
- Coordinates: 21°05′N 72°38′E

Details
- Owned by: Essar Group(original); Adani Group (current)
- Draft depth: 14 metres (46 ft)

Hazira Port or Surat Port is a deep-water liquefied natural gas (LNG) terminal and multi-cargo deep-water port about 20 miles southwest of Surat, India built by Essar Group. It was originally designed as a captive port for Essar Steel. The current container port has been acquired by Adani Group. The LNG facility is a joint venture between Shell Gas B.V (Shell) and Total Gaz Electricité Holdings France (Total). Shell has 74% stake in the venture, with Total holding the remainder.

== See also ==
- List of tourist attractions in Surat
