= John Vaux =

Deputy Governor of Bombay

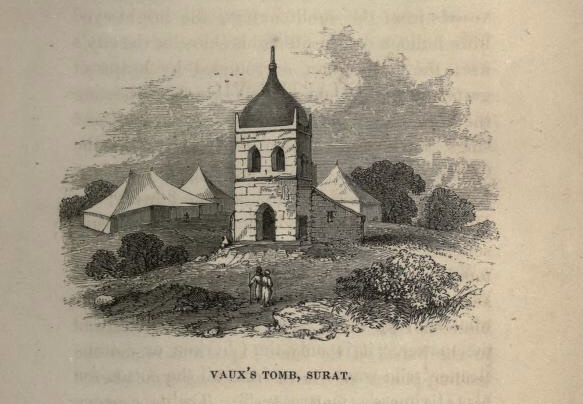
- Born: 1630s-1650s England
- Died: 1697; River Tapi, Surat, India
- Cause of death: Drowning
- Occupations: Book-keeper (-1685), Civil Judge (1685-89), Deputy Governor of Bombay (1689), East India Company worker (1689-1692)

John Vaux was the Deputy Governor of Bombay in 1689. In the year 1697, when Vaux, along with his wife, were enjoying a boat ride in River Tapi in Surat, the boat capsized. A landmark known as Vaux's Tomb was built at the mouth of the River Tapi. The tomb served as a guide to approaching sailors.

== Early life ==
John Vaux himself grew up in England, and later served as a book-keeper to Sir Josiah Child, the former Governor of the East India Company. The 'History of Gujarat' by M. S. Commissariat states that Vaux was on account of his good behaviour made by his master, a supercargo in charge of a ship employed to trade with China. Soon after, Vaux boarded a ship to Bombay where he was appointed a factor. Subsequently, in 1685, he was made Civil Judge in charge of prosecuting interlopers and pirates. In a letter to Sir Josiah Child, Vaux acknowledged his gratitude for the honour, power and position bestowed upon him. He wrote, "The laws of his country should be the rules he designed to walk by."

This remark however irritated the potentate at the India House, who wrote back, "He expected his orders to be his rule, not the laws of England." The then Admiralty Judge, St John, wrote to the secretary of the state complaining that Vaux, a man ignorant of law and unqualified for duties related to the bench, should not have been appointed for such an important office.

In spite of this, when Bartholomew Harris was appointed Governor of Bombay in 1690, John Vaux was promoted to Deputy Governor.

=== Accusation of spying ===
In the year 1692, John Vaux was discharged from the company, for having been suspected of having traitorous communication with the French. It was later said in a book by Alexander Hamilton, 'A New Account of the East Indies’, that Vaux had become hostile towards the English. Vaux did not have any major noted career after this event.

== Vaux’s Tomb ==
As mentioned above, in the year 1697, when Vaux and his wife were on a boat in the River Tapi, the boat capsized and both of them drowned to their deaths. A tomb was built to honor the couple, known as Vaux's Tomb.

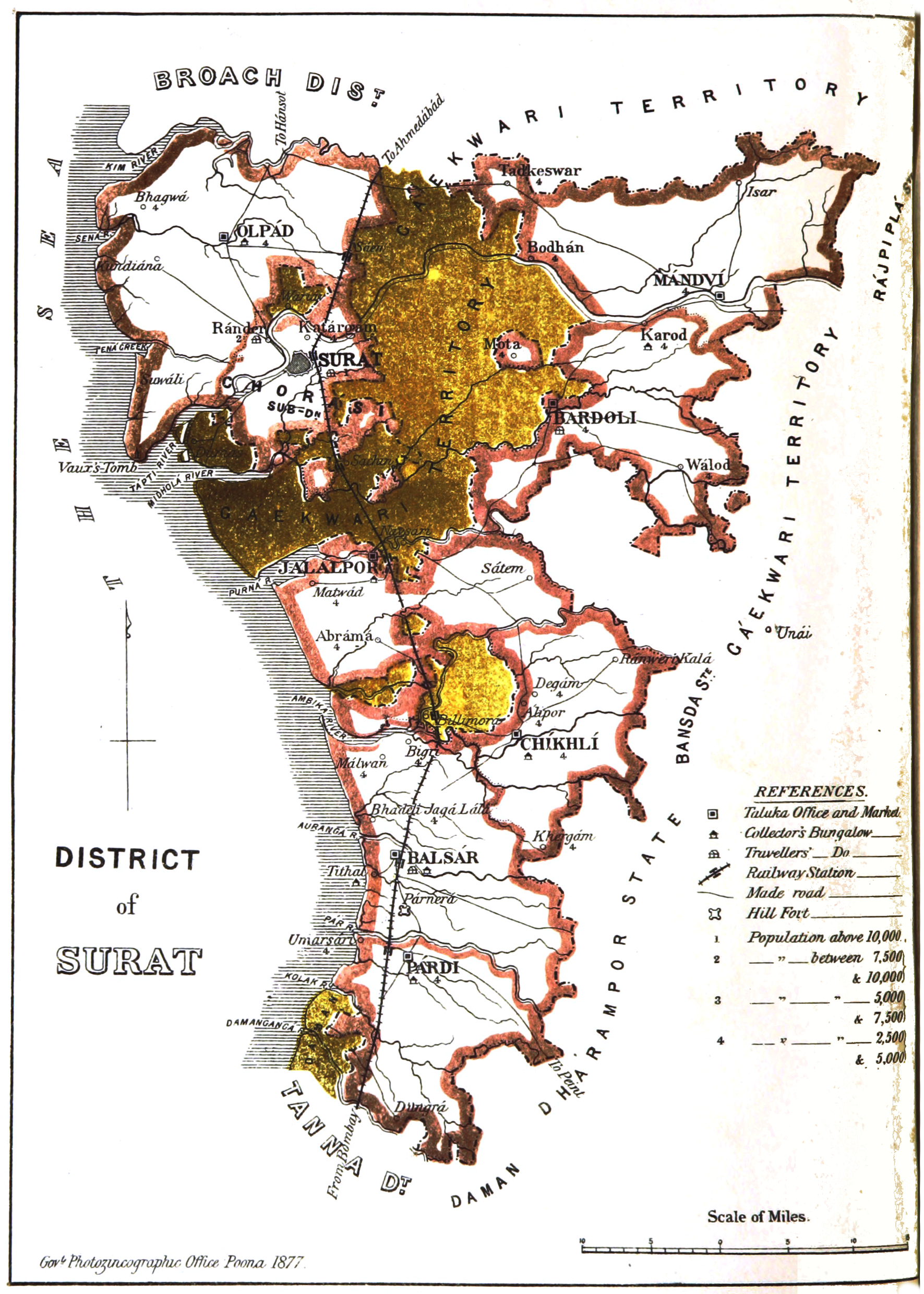
Vaux's Tomb is marked at the mouth of the River Tapi.

Constructed at the mouth of the river, with a dome 30 feet high, the Tomb served as a landmark for sailors and traders, signifying that they had reached the city of Surat, since the city used to be the emporium of India, a great port city and trading centre.

The location of Vaux's Tomb has been mentioned in Daniel Defoe's Robinson Crusoe. The Tomb was also a popular picnic destination and one of the main sights to see in Surat at the time.

The tomb was razed sometime in the 1800s to build the Hazira lighthouse. Only a plaque remains signifying its former glory.

=== Etymology of Hazira ===
Hazira today is one of the major ports of India and the most important part of Surat Metropolitan Region.

The village was originally known as Dhau. The name Hazira comes from Vaux's Tomb. The local Gujaratis called him 'Bakas', or 'Vakas' (બકાસ/વકાસ), and called the Tomb 'Bakasno Hajiro' (બકાસનો હજીરો), borrowed from the Persian word 'hajira' meaning tomb. The name changed and was given to the village of Dhau.

== See also ==
- Deputy Governor
- East India Company
- Hazira
- History of Surat
- List of governors of Bombay Presidency
- Tapti River
