= Hazira =

Hazira Surat
- Suburb
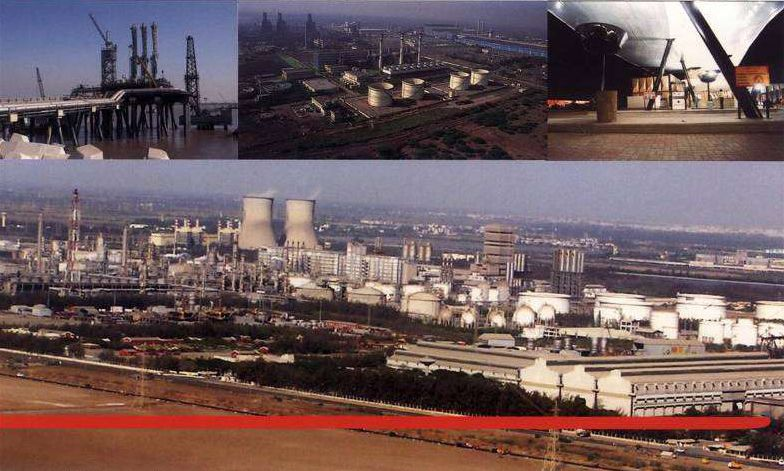
- Hazira Industries

- Location in Gujarat, India Hazira Surat (India)
- Coordinates: 21.161°N 72.664°E
- Country: India
- State: Gujarat
- District: Surat

Government
  - Type: Municipal Corporation
  - Body: Surat Municipal Corporation

Area
  - Total: 168 km^{2} (65 sq mi)
- Elevation: 4 m (13 ft)

Population (2011)
  - Total: 5,562
  - Density: 33.1/km^{2} (85.7/sq mi)

Languages
  - Official: Gujarati
- Time zone: UTC+5:30 (IST)
- PIN: 394270
- Phone code: 0261
- Vehicle registration: GJ-05
- City: Surat
- Civic agency: Surat Municipal Corporation

Hazira is a suburb and a transshipment port in the Surat City in the Gujarat state of India. It is the west most end of Surat.

Hazira is one of the major ports of India and the most important element of Surat Metropolitan Region. The town is known as the industrial hub of India and is located on the bank of the Tapti River, 8 kilometres away from the Arabian Sea. It is a centre for health tourism due to its natural springs, and a base for major industrial and shipping facilities like Essar, Kribhco, Shell, Larsen & Toubro, NTPC, ONGC, GAIL, GSEG power plant, Gujarat State Petroleum Corporation, UltraTech Cement and Hazira Manufacturing Division (HMD) of Reliance Industries.

== Etymology ==
The original name of the village was Dhau. The village had a grave, Vaux's Tomb of the Deputy Governor of Bombay named John Vaux. The grave in Gujarati was known as "Bakasno Hajiro" (બકાસનો હજીરો) is called as "Hajiro" (હજીરો). The name became popular and village became famous as Hajira.

== Transport ==
Hazira is 22 km from Surat and takes 30–35 minutes from Surat to Hazira. One can avail Gujarat State Road Transport Corporation's bus service from Adajan GSRTC Depot to reach Hazira.

== Port ==
Hazira Port is a deep-water liquefied natural gas (LNG) terminal and multi-cargo port. The LNG terminal is operational and it is India's largest, with a storage and export capacity of 2.5 million tonnes. It is a joint venture between Shell Oil and Total S.A. Storage and export capacity is intended to be increased to 3.8 million tonnes by the end of 2009.

A container terminal capable of handling one million TEU is currently under construction by Singapore company PSA Corporation.

L&T shipyard started production of small ships and naval crafts in 2010. In 2021 the facility was renamed the A M Naik Heavy Engineering Complex.

In May 2025, the Indian Navy warship INS Surat docked in Hazira.

== See also ==
- List of tourist attractions in Surat
