= Pandit Deendayal Energy University =

Private university in Gujarat, India

- PDEU Emblem
- Other names: PDEU (Acronym), formerly PDPU
- Former name: Pandit Deendayal Petroleum University
- Motto in English: A Reservoir of knowledge
- Established: 2007
- Parent institution: Gujarat Energy Research & Management Institute; GSPC Group, Government of Gujarat
- Accreditation: NAAC; AICTE; NBA; SIRO
- Affiliations: AIU; UGC
- Chairman: Mukesh Ambani
- President: Mukesh Ambani
- Director-General: Sundar S. Manoharan
- Location: Raysan, Gandhinagar, Gujarat, 382426, India; 23.156°N 72.666°E
- Campus: 100 acres (0.40 km^{2}); Urban
- Website: pdeu.ac.in pdpu.ac.in
- Location of PDEU, Gandhinagar, Gujarat, India

Pandit Deendayal Energy University (PDEU), formerly Pandit Deendayal Petroleum University (PDPU), is a private university in Gandhinagar, the capital of the Gujarat state of India. Originally founded with a focus on petroleum and other fossil fuels, it was established on the 4th of April, 2007, by the Gujarat Energy Research & Management Institute (GERMI), a subdivision of the GSPC Group, an oil and gas company owned by the Government of Gujarat. The university is located at Knowledge Corridor in Raysan municipality, adjacent to the GIFT City of Gandhinagar.

Pandit Deendayal Energy University (PDEU) has been awarded Scientific & Industrial Research Organization (SIRO) recognition by Department of Scientific and Industrial Research, Ministry of Science & Technology, Government of India.

PDEU has been ranked as No. 1 University in Gujarat (by Gujarat State Ranking Frameworks) and has received "Centre of Excellence Status" (in Principle) by Government of Gujarat.

The university has four schools, located on the same campus. The schools include the School of Energy Technology (SoET)(formerly, School of Petroleum Technology), the School of Technology (SoT), the School of Management (SoM) (formerly, School of Petroleum Management), and the School of Liberal Studies (SLS). The President of University Board of Governors is Mukesh Ambani and the Chairman of the Standing Committee is Dr. Hasmukh Adhia.

The university also has its own 1 megawatt solar power plant. The Government of Gujarat has set up an International Automobile Centre of Excellence near PDPU with investment of Rs. 150 Crores (US$25M) in joint venture with Maruti Suzuki.

== History ==
Pandit Deendayal Energy University (PDEU) has been formed on Gujarat energy Research and Management Institute (GERMI) as a university through the State Act enacted on 4 April 2007.

The university is recognized by UGC (University Grants Commission) and is a member of AIU (Association of Indian Universities). The university has been accredited with Grade A++ by the National Assessment and Accreditation Council

In March 2018, the University Grants Commission (India) granted autonomy to PDPU under its graded autonomy framework. The decision was announced by the then Minister of Human Resource Development, Prakash Javadekar. The university was one of only two private universities in India accorded this autonomy in 2018 and the first in Gujarat.

Henceforth university will have the freedom to start new courses, off-campus centers, skill development courses, research parks, and any other new academic programs. It will also give it the freedom to hire foreign faculty, enroll foreign students, give incentive-based emoluments to the faculty, enter into academic collaborations and run open distance learning programs.

== Schools ==
The 5 constituent schools of PDEU offer both niche programs as well as programs of general interest, covering undergraduate, postgraduate and Doctoral programs in Management, Humanities, Science, Engineering and Law.

- School of Management ( formerly School of Petroleum Management) (Established in 2006) offers MBA and Executive MBA programs with specialisations in Energy and Infrastructure, General Management (Operations, Marketing, HR, and Finance).
- School of Energy Technology ( formerly School of Petroleum Technology) Established in 2007 offers B.Tech., M.Tech., B.Sc., M.Sc. and Ph.D. programs in Chemical Engineering, Electrical Engineering, Petroleum Engineering, Petrochemical Engineering, Nuclear Energy, Solar Energy, Biotechnology, Physics and Chemistry.
- School of Technology, Established in 2010 offers B.Tech. M.Tech., B.Sc., M.Sc. and Ph.D. programs in, Automobile Engineering, Civil Engineering, Mechanical Engineering, Information and Communication Technology, and Computer Engineering and its subsidiary branches, and Mathematics.
- School of Liberal Studies (Established, 2009) offers UG honors degree programs in Humanities, Management, Science, and Commerce viz. Business Administration, Economics, English Literature, International Relations, Public Policy & Administration, Psychology, Mass Communication, Commerce. It also offers MA Programs in English Literature, Public Policy & Administration, and International Relations; as well as Ph.D. programs in the same areas.
- School of Law (Established in 2025) offers undergraduate, postgraduate and doctoral programs in Law.

== Rankings ==
University rankings

General – India
- NIRF (Universities) (2023): 151-200

Engineering – India
- NIRF (2023): 101-150

Business/Management – India
- NIRF (2023): 94

The university is ranked in the 151-200 band by National Institutional Ranking Framework (NIRF). It was also ranked in the 101-150th band in engineering and 94th in management.

== Campus and Infrastructure ==
The campus is located at 14 km from the Sardar Vallabhbhai Patel International Airport and 21 km from Ahmedabad's Kalupur Railway Station. It is 3 km off the main road connecting Gandhinagar to Ahmedabad Airport, Ahmedabad. The university is spread across a 100 acres campus. The campus is dotted with mango trees.
