= GSEG Combined Cycle Power plant, Hazira =

Gas-fired power plant in Hazira, India

- Country: India
- Location: Hazira, Gujarat
- Coordinates: 21°09′55.7″N 72°39′41.5″E
- Status: Operational
- Commission date: June 2002
- Owner: Gujarat State Energy Generation Ltd. (GSEG)

Thermal power station
- Primary fuel: Natural Gas
- Combined cycle?: Yes

Power generation
- Units operational: 2* 52 MW Gas Turbine Unit, 1 52.1 MW Steam Turbine Unit
- Make and model: Alstom
- Nameplate capacity: 156.1 MW

GSEG Combined Cycle Power plant, Hazira is a gas based combined cycle power plant located at Hazira, Gujarat, in India.

== History ==
The project is a joint venture between Gujarat State Petroleum Corporation (GSPC) Ltd., GAIL, Krishak Bharati Cooperative (KRIBHCO) and other Government of Gujarat Companies. Gujarat State Energy Generation Ltd. GSEG is a power company in Gujarat. It is a subsidiary of GSPC. The company is engaged in gas based generation of electricity.

The average natural gas requirement for the project is 0.78 million cubic metres (MCM)/day which is sourced from gas exploration company GSPC and is transported by gas transportation company Gujarat State Petronet Limited.

== Capacity ==
Combined Cycle Power Plant, Hazira
Unit	Installed Capacity (MW)	Type
1	52	GTG
2	52	GTG
3	52.1	STG
