= Gujarat State Financial Corporation =

State owned financial institution in Gujarat, India

Gujarat State Financial Corporation is a financial institution established by the State Government of Gujarat, India in 1961 under the State Financial Corporations Act, 1951. The corporation is under control of the Industries & Mines Department of the Government of Gujarat.

== Function ==
The main activity of the corporation was to sanction/disburse loans and advances to small and medium industrial units in Gujarat under various schemes.

In 2001, the corporation discontinued its main activity, viz., lending and advancing, and since then has been concentrating only on recovery and on its allied functions. The corporation discharges its functions/duties through a board of directors which consists of a chairman, a managing director, nominees of the state government and nominees of SIDBI.
