= Hardgrove Grindability Index =

Measure for the grindability of coal

Hardgrove Grindability Index (short HGI) is a measure for the grindability of coal. Grindability is an index, therefore it has no unit. The smaller the HGI, the harder is coal texture and less grindable is the coal.

Grindability is an important factor for the design a coal mill. As grindability depends on many unknown factors, HGI is determined empirically using a sample mill according to the following procedure:

== Procedure of measurement ==
50 g of air dried coal featuring a grain size in the range between 0.6 and 1.18 mm are filled into the sample mill and a weight is put on the mill's grinding stone. After 60 rounds the grinded coal is put on a sampling sieve. Factor D equals the fraction of the coal passing through the sieve of 74 μm corresponding to 200 mesh. HGI is calculated from D as follows:

$$H= 13 + 6{.}93 \cdot D$$

This procedure only results in relative values because the sampling mill is calibrated using a reference coal. The HGI of the reference coal is defined as 100.

== Developer ==
HGI is named after Ralph M. Hardgrove (born 1891 in Massillon, Ohio, died October 29, 1978, in Jacksonville, Florida), who developed this procedure in the 1930s for the company Babcock & Wilcox in the USA.

The procedure is generally accepted and standardized by ASTM-Standard D 409, DIN 51742 and ISO 5074.
