= Gujarat State Petroleum Corporation =

State-owned oil and gas exploration group

Gujarat State Petroleum Corporation Ltd
- Type: State Government Agency
- Industry: Oil and gas
- Founded: 1979
- Founder: Government of Gujarat
- Headquarters: Gandhinagar, Gujarat, India
- Area served: India
- Key people: J.N. Singh, IAS (Chairman & Managing Director); Sujit Gulati, IAS (Director); T.Natarajan, IAS (Joint Managing Director)
- Revenue: ▲₹18,000 crore (US$1.9 billion)(FY2022)
- Operating income: ▲₹2,920.63 crore (US$300 million)(FY2022)
- Net income: ▲₹1,638.30 crore (US$170 million)(FY2022)
- Owner: Government of Gujarat (95%)
- Parent: Department of Energy and Petrochemicals, Government of Gujarat
- Subsidiaries: Gujarat Gas; Gujarat State Petronet Limited; GSPL India Gasnet Limited; GSPL India Transco Limited (GITL); Sabarmati Gas Limited; GSPC Pipavav Power Company Limited; Gujarat State Energy Generation Limited; Guj Info Petro Limited; GSPC LNG Limited; Gujarat Energy Research and Management Institute
- Website: www.gspcgroup.com

Gujarat State Petroleum Corporation Ltd (GSPCL) is a state government-owned group of oil and gas exploration, production and distribution companies based in Gujarat, India. It is India's only state government-owned oil and gas company under the ownership of Department of Energy and Petrochemicals, Government of Gujarat. GSPC was incorporated in 1979 as a petrochemical company.

== History ==
Incorporated in 1979 as a petrochemical company, GSPC was originally involved in a wide gamut of hydrocarbon activities. In 1992, GSPC widened the scope of its activities, and rechristened itself as Gujarat State Petroleum Corporation in 1994. With the Government of India's decision to privatize the hydrocarbon sector in 1994, GSPC acquired several discovered fields in the first and second rounds of the bidding process.

== Current Operations ==
GSPC has commandeered one of India's largest gas finds in the Krishna Godavari Basin. It has also built the country's first land-based drilling platform, Ratnakar, at Hazira. GSPC is also currently involved in exploration activities in Egypt, Yemen, Indonesia, and Australia.

== Subsidiaries ==
=== Gas ===
Gujarat State Petronet Limited (GSPL) is a natural gas transmission company. It has 2239 km long gas pipeline network (Gujarat Gas Grid) in Gujarat. Gujarat Gas (GGL) is natural gas distribution company which is India's largest city gas distribution company. GSPL India Gasnet Limited (GIGL) and GSPL India Transco Limited (GITL) are join ventures promoted by GSPL along with Indian Oil Corporation Limited (IOCL), Bharat Petroleum Corporation Limited (BPCL) and Hindustan Petroleum Corporation Limited (HPCL) for the purpose of implementation of 2100 km pipeline passing through Mehsana – Bhatinda – Jammu – Srinagar and another 2042 km pipeline passing through Mallavarm – Bhopal – Bhilwara – Vijaipur respectively. Sabarmati Gas Limited (27.47% holding) was incorporated in 2006 for developing gas distribution network in 3 districts; Gandhinagar, Mehsana and Sabarkantha. GSPL (27.47%), GSPC (11.25%) and BPCL holds another 25.0% and institutional investors together hold rest of the company. GSPC LNG Limited (GLL) holds stake in the 5.0 million tonnes per year LNG terminal at Mundra which shall be commissioned in 2020.

=== Power generation ===
Gujarat State Energy Generation (GSEG) is a company for power generation in Gujarat which operate Haziara Gas Powerplant commissioned in 2002. GSPC Pipavav Power Company is a company for implementation of a power project at Pipavav in Saurashtra region of Gujarat. It is jointly held by Gujarat Power Corporation Ltd. (GPCL) of Gujarat Government.

=== IT ===
Guj Info Petro Ltd. (GIPL) provides IT and telecommunication services.

=== Education ===
The Gujarat Energy Research and Management Institute (GERMI) is an institution for energy education (through PDEU), training, and research.
