= Gujarat Energy Transmission Corporation =

Electricity transmission company in Gujarat, India

GETCO
- Type: Public Sector Utility (subsidiary of GUVNL)
- Industry: Power
- Predecessor: Gujarat Electricity Board [GEB]
- Founded: Vadodara, INDIA (May 1999)
- Headquarters: Vadodara, INDIA
- Number of locations: 2024 Substations as on 31.03.2020
- Area served: Gujarat [INDIA]
- Key people: Ajay Prakash, IAS [Managing Director]
- Services: Power Transmission
- Owner: GUVNL, Government of Gujarat
- Number of employees: 17,000+ (2025)
- Parent: Gujarat Urja Vikas Nigam Ltd.
- Website: www.getcogujarat.com

The Gujarat Energy Transmission Corporation Limited (GETCO) is an electrical power transmission company in the state of Gujarat, India. It was set up in May 1999 and is registered under the Companies Act of 1956. The company was promoted by the erstwhile Gujarat Electricity Board (GEB) as its wholly owned-subsidiary in the context of liberalization and as a part of efforts towards restructuring of the power sector. The company is now a subsidiary of Gujarat Urja Vikas Nigam, the successor company to the GEB.

== GETCO at a glance ==
System Strength (as on 31 March 2020)

System Voltage (in KV)	No. Of Substations	Transmission Lines (in KM)
400	16	6,096
220	105	20,478
132	57	5,566
66/33	1846	33,468
All	2024	65,608

== See also ==
- Gujarat Urja Vikas Nigam Limited GUVNL
- Gujarat State Electricity Corporation Limited GSECL
- State Load Dispatch Center SLDC
- Dakshin Gujarat Vij Company Limited DGVCL
- Madhya Gujarat Vij Company Limited MGVCL
- Paschim Gujarat Vij Company Limited PGVCL
- Uttar Gujarat Vij Company Limited UGVCL
- Gujarat Energy Training and Research Institute GETRI
