= Paschim Gujarat Vij =

Electricity supply company in West Gujarat, India

Paschim Gujarat Vij Company Limited
- Type: Public Limited (subsidiary of GUVNL)
- Industry: Energy
- Predecessor: Gujarat Electricity Board [GEB]
- Founded: Vadodara, INDIA (May 1999)
- Headquarters: Rajkot, Rajkot, India
- Number of locations: Many 2008-03-31
- Area served: Saurastra and Ku tchchh, Gujarat [INDIA]
- Products: distribution of electricity
- Owner: GUVNL
- Number of employees: 14000+ (2010)
- Parent: Gujarat Urja Vikas Nigam Ltd.
- Subsidiaries: 0
- Website: www.pgvcl.com

Paschim Gujarat Vij Company Ltd. is an electricity company that was incorporated on 15 September 2003 by Gujarat Electricity Board (GEB). The Company obtained the Certificate of the Commencement of Business on 15 October 2003. The company was one of several created as a part of efforts towards restructuring of the power sector in the state of Gujarat in India.

== Description ==
The company is involved in electricity sub-transmission distribution and retail supply in the State of Gujarat. Their mandate is to establish and use a power system network and to buy and sell electrical energy, and to collect information with an eye towards further system improvements.

The Gujarat Electricity Industry (Re-Organization & Regulation) Act 2003 paved the way for comprehensive reform and restructuring of the State Electricity Board with an aim to restructure the Electricity Industry in a manner that will ensure the long term viability and sustainability of the power sector in the state. As a part of the reform process, the GEB was disaggregated into several autonomous entities. PGVCL is undertaken by government of Gujarat.

The Electricity Act 2003 introduced competition by way of open access in the transmission and distribution of electricity. The Act also provided for reorganization of the Electricity Boards through appropriate transfer schemes being formulated by the state governments. The Government of Gujarat reorganized the GEB functionally into a Generation Company, a Transmission Company and four Distribution Companies. Thereby Paschim Gujarat Vij Company Limited became functional on 1 April 2005.

== See also ==
- Gujarat State Electricity Corporation Limited GSEC
- Gujarat Energy Transmission Corporation limited Getco
- State Load Dispatch Center SLDC
- Dakshin Gujarat Vij Company Limited DGVCL
- Madhya Gujarat Vij Company Limited MGVCL
- Uttar Gujarat Vij Company Limited UGVCL
- Gujarat Energy Training and Research Institute GETRI
