= Gujarat Gas =

Indian natural gas distribution company

Gujarat Gas Company Limited
- Type: Public
- Traded as: BSE: 523477; NSE: GUJRATGAS
- Industry: Oil and gas
- Predecessor: Gujarat Gas Company Limited (GGCL); GSPC Gas; GSPC Distribution Network Ltd.
- Founded: 1980
- Founder: Government of Gujarat
- Headquarters: Gandhinagar, India
- Area served: India
- Key people: Pankaj Joshi (Chairman)
- Revenue: ▲₹10,610 crore (US$1.1 billion) (FY2019-20)
- Operating income: ▲₹1,718 crore (US$180 million) (FY2019-20)
- Net income: ▲₹1,195 crore (US$120 million) (FY2019-20)
- Owner: Gujarat State Petronet (54.17%)
- Website: www.gujaratgas.com

Gujarat Gas Limited is an Indian natural gas distribution company, which operates primarily in Gujarat. It was established in 1980 and is headquartered in Gandhinagar. It is India's largest city gas distribution (CGD) company.

== History ==
Gujarat Gas Company Limited (GGCL) was incorporated in 1980, and is in the business of procurement and distribution of natural gas. The company went public in October 1991, listing on the Bombay Stock Exchange and the National Stock Exchange. The BG Group acquired a majority stake in the company in 1997. In October 2012, the majority owner in the firm, BG Group, sold its 65% stake for a fee of around $470 million. The buyer was GSPC Gas, a unit of the state-run Gujarat State Petroleum Corporation (GSPC). GSPC Gas and GGCL were merged in 2015 and the new company was named Gujarat Gas Limited.

== Operations ==
As of May 2015, Gujarat Gas Limited has City Gas Distribution (CGD) network in 649 human settlements (city, town, villages) in 19 districts of Gujarat and Union Territory of Dadra and Nagar Haveli and Thane GA (including Palghar district) of Maharashtra.

As of 2017, it has the largest customer base in gas distribution sector in India: 10,80,000 domestic households, 2,835 industrial customers, 11,900 commercial and non-commercial customers, 233 CNG stations selling more than 7,65,000 kg of CNG per day serving to more than 1,60,000 vehicles per day. It has achieved the highest total daily gas sales volume in India, up to 6.5 million cubic metre per day at standard conditions. It market capitalisation was Rs. 10,600 crore (15 May 2015).
