= Energy in India =

Energy consumption by source, India

Development of carbon dioxide emissions

Since 2013, the total primary energy consumption in India has been the third greatest in the world (see world energy consumption) after China and the United States. Having the largest national population of over 1.4 billion people, its per capita energy consumption is still below the median for all nations despite its large total energy consumptionn. India was a net energy importer, importing nearly 47% of its total primary energy in 2019.

While much of its energy comes from fossil fuels, as of 2024, India is in the midst of a very rapid growth of solar and other renewable energy. However, this page currently only discusses the country's fossil fuel–based energy. For information about its renewable energy sources, see the page Renewable energy in India.

== Overview ==
In 2022-23, Total Primary Energy Supply (TPES) per capita is 25,745 mega joule whereas Total Final Consumption per capita is 16,699 mega joule. Electricity consumption per capita is 1015 kWh in 2022-23. The energy intensity of agriculture is seven times less than industries in 2022-23 (see Table 8.9)

Yearwise consumption of energy sources
Fiscal year	Mid Year Population (million)	Coal (million tonnes)	Lignite (million tonnes)	Crude oil (million tonnes)	Natural gas (billion cubic meters)	Electricity@ (billion kWh)	Eq CO_{2}-emissions (million tonnes)
2013-14	1,252	739	44	222	52	874	2,087.5
2014-15	1,268	822	47	223	51	948	2,248.1
2015-16	1,284	837	42	233	53	1,001	2,321.4
2016-17	1,299	837	43	245	56	1,061	2,425.2
2017-18	1,313	898	46	252	59	1,123	2,493.6
2018-19	1,328	968	46	257	61	1,209	2,613.2
2019-20	1,342	956	42	254	64	1,248	2,645.4
2020-21	1,357	906	38	222	61	1,230	2,450.3
2021-22	1,370	1,028	49	242	64	1,316	2,700.5
2022-23	1,383	1,115	47	255	60	1,403	2,865.2

@ Includes electricity generated from fossil fuels.

India: Total primary energy use of 753.7 Mtoe (excluding traditional biomass use) in the calendar year 2017
1. 424.0 Mtoe Coal (56.3%)
2. 222.1 Mtoe Petroleum & other liquids (29.5%)
3. 46.6 Mtoe Natural gas (6.18%)
4. 8.5 Mtoe Nuclear (1.13%)
5. 30.7 Mtoe Hydroelectricity (4.07%)
6. 21.8 Mtoe Other renewables (2.89%)

Energy in India
	Population million	Prim. energy TWh	Production TWh	Import TWh	Electricity TWh	CO_{2}-emission Mt
2004	1,080	6,662	5,430	1,230	494	1,103
2007	1,123	6,919	5,244	1,745	610	1,324
2008	1,140	7, 222	5,446	1,836	645	1,428
2009	1,155	7,860	5,844	2,116	690	1,586
2010	1,171	8,056	6,032	2,110	755	1,626
2012	1,241	8,716	6,291	2,483	835	1,745
2012R	1,237	9,166	6,333	2,829	940	1,954
2013	1,250	9,018	6,086	2,962	979	1,869
Change 2004–10	8.4%	20.9%	11.1%	72%	53%	47.4%
Mtoe = 11.63 TWh, Prim. energy includes energy losses that are 2/3 for nuclear power 2012R = CO2 calculation criteria changed, numbers updated

== Coal ==
Coal production of India

In 2023, India was both the second largest producer of coal and second largest consumer of coal, although for both statistics having less than a fourth of that of leading China. India is planning to use 100 million tonnes of coal for gasification by 2030. The abundantly available coal in India is low rank coal which is not suitable for coal gasification without blending with pet coke. However, low rank coal/lignite can be converted to natural gas by using hydrogen.

Coal and lignite production was 73.1 crore (731 million) tons in the financial year 2019-2020. India was the fourth top coal producer in 2017 with 294.2 Mtons (7.8% global share). Nearly 80% of total electricity generated (utility and captive) in India is from coal and it is the main source of the nation's greenhouse gas emissions.

According to Greenpeace the largest coal belt in India is at Jharia. Before coal mining Jharia had forests inhabited by tribes. In 1971 the coal mines were nationalised. Bharat Coking Coal Limited (BCCL) took over Jharia coal mines.

India accounts for the world’s greatest concentration of coal seam fires. Mine area suffers from pollution of air, water and land.

As of 2019, coal production was integrated into the Central Government; for example, the Government owned about 75% of Coal India Limited, which supplied about 84% of India's thermal coal.

India imports coking coal as good quality coking coal deposits suitable for iron and steel production are not available. In the financial year 2021 -22, India imported nearly 57.16 million tons (90%) against the consumption of 63.74 MT. Sponge iron route using noncoking coal is also followed to produce iron and steel which does not depend on coke or natural gas.

== Oil and natural gas ==
As of 2022, India was the fourth top oil consumer globally, at 5.2 million barrels per day (5% of global consumption). However, on a per capita basis, its standing is much lower. India was the second-top net crude oil (including crude oil products) importer of 205.3 Mt in 2019. India has 49.72 lakh (4.972 million) barrels per day (5.1% of the world) crude oil refining capacity which is ranked 4th globally in 2017.

== Liquefied petroleum gas ==
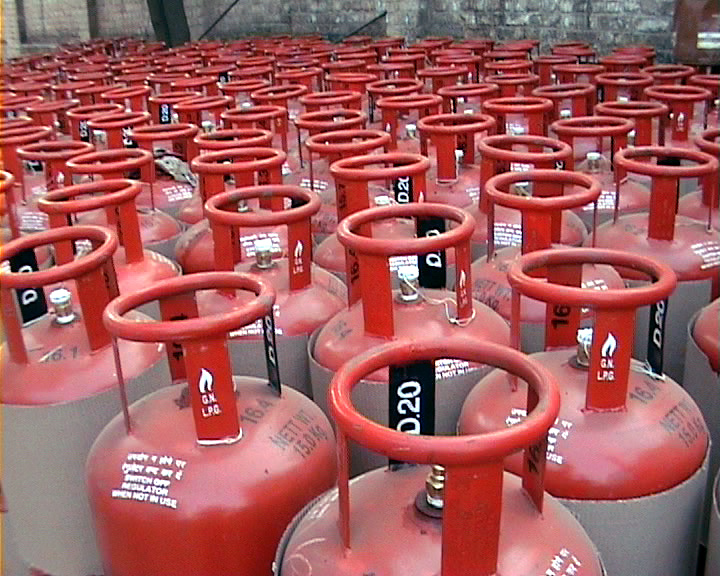
Cylinders with LPG in India

Nearly 1 crore (10.937 million) tons Liquefied Petroleum Gas (LPG) was consumed during April to September 2019 (six months) in the domestic sector mainly for cooking. The number of domestic connections are 274 million (one connection for five people) with a circulation of more than 40 crore (400 million) LPG cylinders whose net aggregate length would form a 2,00,000 km long pipe line which is more than the length of total railway track laid in India. India is second largest consumer of LPG globally. Most of the LPG requirement is imported. Piped city gas supply in India is not yet developed on major scale.

== Biomass and charcoal ==
Biomass is a renewable energy source and its use as feedstock to produce biofuels or organic chemicals is mostly carbon-neutral fuel. Carbon dioxide is first taken up by plants during photosynthesis, and later released when biomass is burned. Presently, only 20% of households in India use biomass and charcoal for cooking purposes as LPG use for cooking purposes is rising rapidly. In addition biomass is also used marginally in commercial cooking, electricity generation, process industries, etc. The total biomass use in India is nearly 177 Mtoe in the year 2013. Substantial surplus crop residue is also burnt in agriculture fields to clear the land for the next crop. Nearly 75 crores (750 million) tons of nonedible (by cattle) biomass is available annually in India which can be put to use for higher value addition without CO_{2} emissions.

Huge quantity of imported coal is being used in pulverised coal-fired power stations. Raw biomass is not suitable for use in the pulverised coal mills as they are difficult to grind into fine powder due to caking problem. However 100% biomass can be fired after torrefaction in the pulverised coal mills for replacing imported coal. Torrefied biomass plants can be integrated with existing pulverised coal-fired power stations using the available hot flue gas as heat source. Cofiring dry biomass up to 20% heat input with coal is also possible directly in pulverised coal-fired power stations without facing caking problem. North west and southern regions can replace imported coal use with biomass where surplus agriculture/crop residue biomass is burnt in the fields causing pollution problems. As traditional use of biomass is being replaced by LPG at a faster pace, biomass burning in agriculture fields would become major source for causing higher level air pollution.

When an existing blast furnace is modified to use biomass products as its fuel, production of green steel, green hydrogen/ammonia/urea and green slag cement are feasible.

Biogas which is mainly methane/natural gas can also be used to produce protein-rich feed for cattle, poultry and fish culture in villages economically by cultivating Methylococcus capsulatus bacteria culture with tiny land and water foot print. The carbon dioxide gas produced as by product from these plants can be put to use in cheaper production of algae oil from algae particularly in tropical countries like India which can displace the prime position of crude oil in near future. Union government is implementing many schemes to utilise productively the agro waste or biomass in rural areas to uplift rural economy and job potential.

== Biofuel ==
In 2021, India imported 85% of petroleum products worth $55 billion. The country set a target of blending 20% ethanol in petrol by 2025 resulting in import substitution and India provides financial assistance for manufacturing ethanol from rice, wheat, barley, corn, sorghum, sugarcane, sugar beet, etc. This target was achieved in 2025.

== Electricity ==
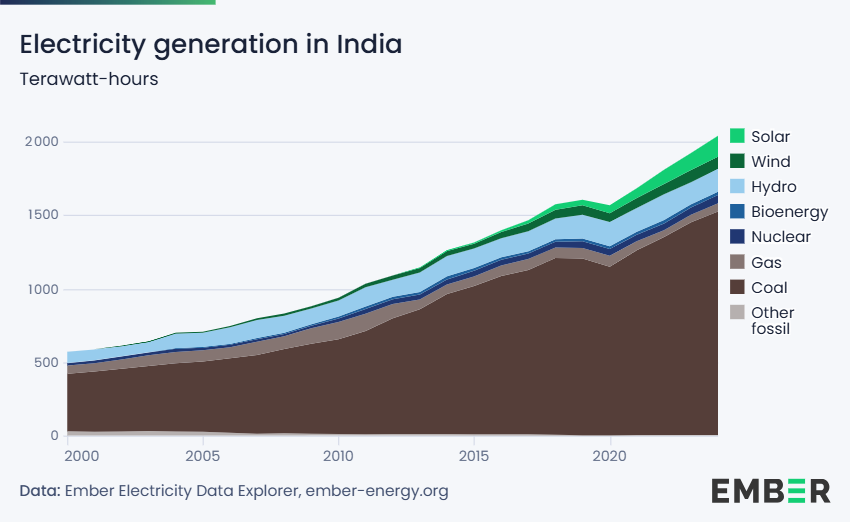
Electricity generation in India - terawatt hours

In India, 99.99% of the population have access to power supply. By 2013, India became the world's third largest producer of electricity with 4.8% global share, surpassing Japan and Russia. India ranks 6th globally in hydropower generation during the year 2019.

India had set a target of 175 gigawatts (GW) of renewable energy (excluding large hydro) capacity by 2022. It included 100 GW capacity from solar energy sources, 60 GW from wind power, 10 GW from biopower, and 5 GW from small hydropower.

As of 31 March 2024, India has 190.573 GW (43% of total) installed capacity of renewable energy. It is one of the world leaders in renewable energy investments and installations.

== Energy reserves ==
India has abundant solar, wind, hydro (including pumped storage) and biomass power potential. In addition, as of January 2011 India had approximately 38 trillion cubic feet (Tcf) of proven natural gas reserves, the world's 26th largest reserve. The United States Energy Information Administration estimates that India produced approximately 1.8 Tcf of natural gas in 2010 while consuming roughly 2.3 Tcf of natural gas. India already produces coalbed methane.

== See also ==
- Climate change in India
- Electricity sector in India
- Energy policy of India
- Hydroelectric power in India
- Renewable energy in India
- Wind power in India
- Solar power in India
- Nuclear power in India
