= Vasava (surname) =

Vasava is a surname. Notable people with the surname include:

- Chhotubhai Vasava (born 1945), Indian politician
- Ganpatsinh Vestabhai Vasava (born 1971), Indian politician
- Mansukhbhai Vasava (born 1957), Indian politician
- Motilal Puniyabhi Vasava, Indian politician
- Parbhubhai Vasava (born 1970), Indian politician
