= Ritesh Vasava =

Indian politician

Ritesh Kumar Ramanbhai Vasava (born 1978) is an Indian politician from Gujarat. He is a member of the Gujarat Legislative Assembly from Jhagadia Assembly constituency, which is a reserved for Scheduled Tribe community, in Bharuch district. He won the 2022 Gujarat Legislative Assembly election representing the Bharatiya Janata Party.

== Early life and education ==
Vasava is from Jhagadia, Bharuch district, Gujarat. He is the son of Ramanbhai Vasava. He studied Class 9 at Shri Indrajeet Vidhyalay, Umarva and passed the examinations in 1991. He later discontinued his studies.

== Career ==
Vasava won from Jhagadia Assembly constituency representing Bharatiya Janata Party in the 2022 Gujarat Legislative Assembly election. He polled 89,933 votes and defeated his nearest rival and seven time MLA, Chhotubhai Vasava an independent candidate and co founder of Bharatiya Tribal Party, by a margin of 23,500 votes. The differences with his son and the other co founder, Mahesh Vasava, forced him to contest as an independent candidate.

In the 2009 Indian general election in Gujarat, he lost from Bardoli Lok Sabha constituency to the Indian National Congress candidate Tushar Amarsinh Chaudhary by a margin of 58,985 votes.
