= Bharuch Lok Sabha constituency =

Lok Sabha constituency in Gujarat

Coordinates: 21.7°N 73.0°E

Bharuch
- Lok Sabha constituency
- Bharuch Lok Sabha Constituency ભરૂચ લોક સભા મતદાર વિભાગ

Constituency details
- Country: India
- Region: Western India
- State: Gujarat
- Assembly constituencies: Karjan; Dediapada; Jambusar; Vagra; Jhagadiya; Bharuch; Ankleshwar
- Established: 1957
- Reservation: None

Member of Parliament
- 18th Lok Sabha
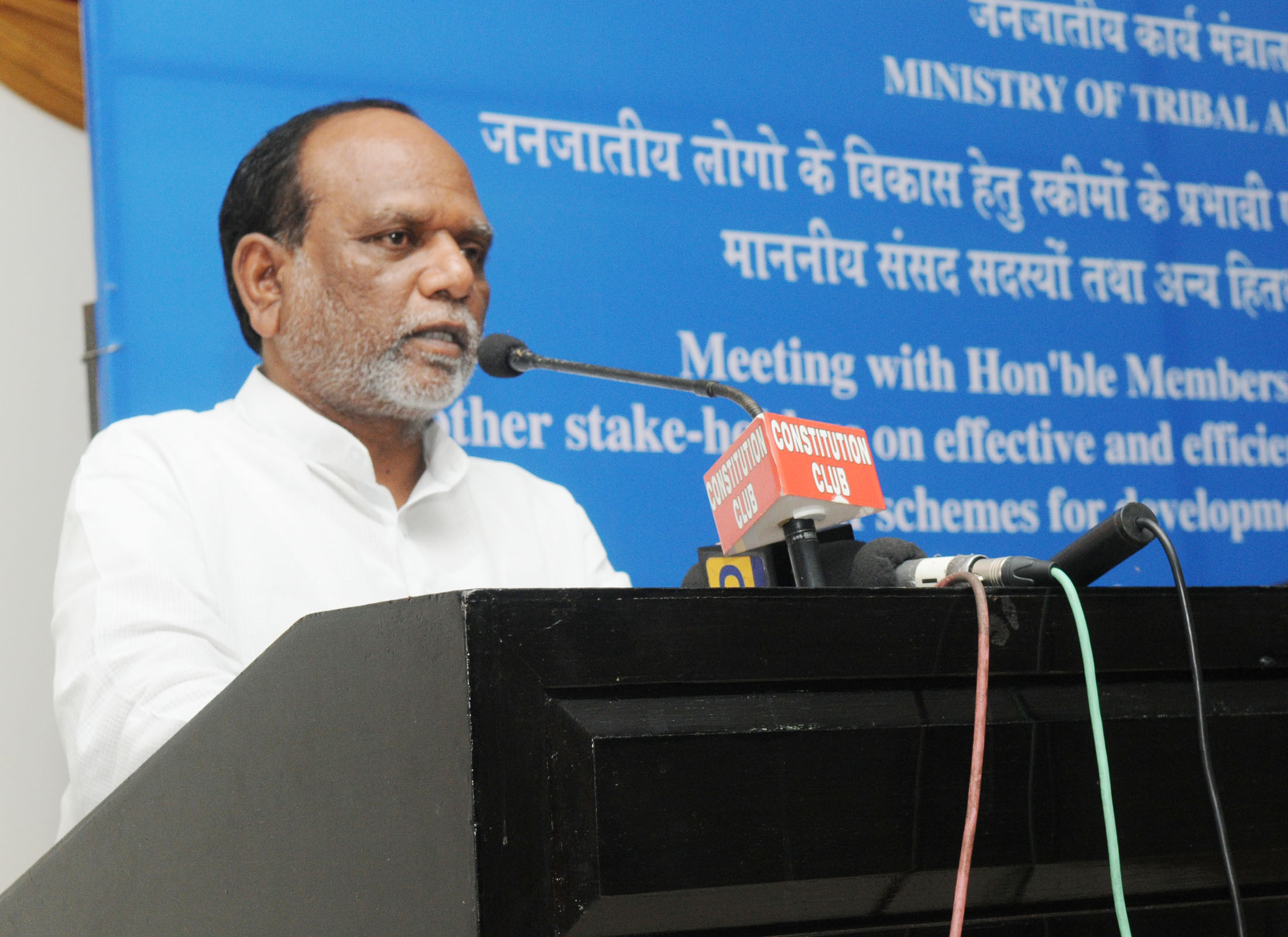
- Incumbent Mansukhbhai Vasava
- Party: Bharatiya Janata Party
- Elected year: 2024

Bharuch (formerly known as Broach) is one of the 26 Lok Sabha (parliamentary) constituencies in Gujarat state in western India.

== Vidhan Sabha segments ==
Presently, Bharuch Lok Sabha constituency comprises seven assembly segments. These are:

Constituency number	Name	Reserved for (SC/ST/None)	District	Party	2024 Lead
147	Karjan	None	Vadodara	BJP	BJP
149	Dediapada	ST	Narmada	Vacant	AAP
150	Jambusar	None	Bharuch	BJP	BJP
151	Vagra	None	Bharuch	BJP	BJP
152	Jhagadiya	ST	Bharuch	BJP	AAP
153	Bharuch	None	Bharuch	BJP	BJP
154	Ankleshwar	None	Bharuch	BJP	BJP

== Members of Parliament ==
Year	Winner	Party
1957	Chandrashanker Bhatt	Indian National Congress
1962	Chhotubhai Patel	Indian National Congress
1967	Mansinhji Rana	Indian National Congress
1971	Mansinhji Rana	Indian National Congress
1977	Ahmed Patel	Indian National Congress
1980	Ahmed Patel	Indian National Congress (I)
1984	Ahmed Patel	Indian National Congress (I)
1989	Chandubhai Deshmukh	Bharatiya Janata Party
1991	Chandubhai Deshmukh	Bharatiya Janata Party
1996	Chandubhai Deshmukh	Bharatiya Janata Party
1998	Chandubhai Deshmukh	Bharatiya Janata Party
1998^	Mansukhbhai Vasava	Bharatiya Janata Party
1999	Mansukhbhai Vasava	Bharatiya Janata Party
2004	Mansukhbhai Vasava	Bharatiya Janata Party
2009	Mansukhbhai Vasava	Bharatiya Janata Party
2014	Mansukhbhai Vasava	Bharatiya Janata Party
2019	Mansukhbhai Vasava	Bharatiya Janata Party
2024	Mansukhbhai Vasava	Bharatiya Janata Party

== Elections results ==
=== 2024 ===
2024 Indian general elections: Bharuch
Party	Candidate	Votes	%	±%
BJP	Mansukhbhai Vasava	608,157	50.72	▼4.75
AAP	Chaitar Vasava	5,22,461	43.58	New
NOTA	None of the above	23,283	1.94	▲1.39
BAP	Dilipbhai Chhotubhai Vasava	10,014	0.84	New
IND	Sajid Yakub Munshi	9,937	0.83	N/A
BSP	Vasava Chetanbhai Kanjibhai	6,324	0.53	N/A
Majority		85,696	7.15	▼21.92
Turnout		11,99,601	69.60	▼3.95
BJP hold		Swing		

=== 2019 ===
2019 Indian general elections: Bharuch
Party	Candidate	Votes	%	±%
BJP	Mansukhbhai Vasava	637,795	55.47	+3.70
INC	Sherkhan Abdulsakur Pathan	3,03,581	26.40	−10.92
BTP	Chhotubhai Vasava	1,44,083	12.53	+12.53
NOTA	None of the Above	6,321	0.55	−1.68
Majority		3,34,214	29.07	+14.61
Turnout		11,50,658	73.55	−1.30
BJP hold		Swing		

=== General election 2014 ===
2014 Indian general elections: Bharuch
Party	Candidate	Votes	%	±%
BJP	Mansukhbhai Vasava	548,902	51.77	+10.27
INC	Jayeshbhai Patel	3,95,629	37.32	−0.55
JD(U)	Anilkumar Bhagat	49,289	4.65	−3.84
NOTA	None of the Above	23,615	2.23	
Majority		1,53,273	14.46	+10.83
Turnout		10,61,060	74.85	+17.10
BJP hold		Swing		

=== General election 2009 ===
2009 Indian general elections: Bharuch
Party	Candidate	Votes	%	±%
BJP	Mansukhbhai Vasava	311,018	41.50	
INC	Aziz Tankarvi	283,787	37.87	
JD(U)	Chhotubhai Vasava	63,660	8.49	
Majority		27,232	3.63	
Turnout		749,420	57.14	
BJP hold		Swing		

=== General election 2004 ===
2004 Indian general elections: Bharuch
Party	Candidate	Votes	%	±%
BJP	Mansukhbhai Vasava	299,630	44.01	
INC	Muhammad Patel	227,428	33.40	
JD(U)	Chhotubhai Vasava	111,600	16.39	
Majority		72,202	10.61	
Turnout		680,834	54.92	
BJP hold		Swing		

== See also ==
- Bharuch district
- List of constituencies of the Lok Sabha
