= Results of the 2009 Indian general election by constituency =

Indian lower house election results

To constitute India's 15th Lok Sabha, general elections were held in April–May 2009. The results were announced on 16 May 2009. The main contenders were two alliance groups of the Incumbent United Progressive Alliance and the Opposition National Democratic Alliance; led by Indian National Congress and Bharatiya Janata Party respectively.

This article describes the performance of various political parties. For the performance of individual candidates, please see, List of members of the 15th Lok Sabha.

Results of the 2009 Indian general election by parliamentary constituency.

== Results by constituency ==
State	Parliamentary Constituency			Winner			Runner-up			Margin
State	No.	Name	Type	Candidate	Party	Votes	Candidate	Party	Votes	Margin
Andaman and Nicobar Islands	1	Andaman & Nicobar Islands	GEN	Bishnu Pada Ray	Bharatiya Janata Party	75,211	Kuldeep Rai Sharma	Indian National Congress	72,221	2,990
Andhra Pradesh	1	Adilabad	(ST)	Ramesh Rathod	Telugu Desam Party	3,72,268	Kotnak Ramesh	Indian National Congress	2,57,181	1,15,087
Andhra Pradesh	2	Peddapalli	(SC)	Gaddam Vivek Venkatswamy	Indian National Congress	3,13,748	Gomasa Srinivas	Telangana Rashtra Samithi	2,64,731	49,017
Andhra Pradesh	3	Karimnagar	GEN	Ponnam Prabhakar	Indian National Congress	3,17,927	Boianapalli Vinod Kumar	Telangana Rashtra Samithi	2,67,684	50,243
Andhra Pradesh	4	Nizamabad	GEN	Madhu Goud Yaskhi	Indian National Congress	2,96,504	Bigala Ganesh Gupta	Telangana Rashtra Samithi	2,36,114	60,390
Andhra Pradesh	5	Zahirabad	GEN	Suresh Shetkar	Indian National Congress	3,95,767	Syed Yousuf Ali	Telangana Rashtra Samithi	3,78,360	17,407
Andhra Pradesh	6	Medak	GEN	Vijayashanti	Telangana Rashtra Samithi	3,88,839	Chaganla Narendra Nath	Indian National Congress	3,82,762	6,077
Andhra Pradesh	7	Malkajgiri	GEN	Sarvey Sathyanarayana	Indian National Congress	3,88,368	Bheemsen T	Telugu Desam Party	2,95,042	93,326
Andhra Pradesh	8	Secunderabad	GEN	Anjan Kumar Yadav	Indian National Congress	3,40,549	Bandaru Dattatreya	Bharatiya Janata Party	1,70,382	1,70,167
Andhra Pradesh	9	Hyderabad	GEN	Asaduddin Owaisi	All India Majlis-e-Ittehadul Muslimeen	3,08,061	Zahid Ali Khan	Telugu Desam Party	1,94,196	1,13,865
Andhra Pradesh	10	Chevella	GEN	Jaipal Reddy	Indian National Congress	4,20,807	A. P. Jithender Reddy	Telugu Desam Party	4,02,275	18,532
Andhra Pradesh	11	Mahbubnagar	GEN	K. Chandrashekar Rao	Telangana Rashtra Samithi	3,66,569	Devarakonda Vittal Rao	Indian National Congress	3,46,385	20,184
Andhra Pradesh	12	Nagarkurnool	(SC)	Manda Jagannath	Indian National Congress	4,22,745	Guvvala Balaraju	Telangana Rashtra Samithi	3,74,978	47,767
Andhra Pradesh	13	Nalgonda	GEN	Gutha Sukender Reddy	Indian National Congress	4,93,849	Suravaram Sudhakar Reddy	Communist Party of India	3,40,867	1,52,982
Andhra Pradesh	14	Bhongir	GEN	Komatireddy Raj Gopal Reddy	Indian National Congress	5,04,103	Nomula Narsimhaiah	Communist Party of India (Marxist)	3,64,215	1,39,888
Andhra Pradesh	15	Warangal	(SC)	Siricilla Rajaiah	Indian National Congress	3,96,568	Ramagalla Parameshwar	Telangana Rashtra Samithi	2,71,907	1,24,661
Andhra Pradesh	16	Mahabubabad	(ST)	Balram Naik	Indian National Congress	3,94,447	Kunja Srinivasa Rao	Communist Party of India	3,25,490	68,957
Andhra Pradesh	17	Khammam	GEN	Nama Nageswara Rao	Telugu Desam Party	4,69,368	Renuka Chowdhury	Indian National Congress	3,44,920	1,24,448
Andhra Pradesh	18	Araku	(ST)	Kishore Chandra Deo	Indian National Congress	3,60,458	Midiyam Babu Rao	Communist Party of India (Marxist)	1,68,014	1,92,444
Andhra Pradesh	19	Srikakulam	GEN	Killi Krupa Rani	Indian National Congress	3,87,694	Kinjarapu Yerran Naidu	Telugu Desam Party	3,04,707	82,987
Andhra Pradesh	20	Vizianagaram	GEN	Jhansi Laxmi Botcha	Indian National Congress	4,11,584	Kondapalli Appalanaidu	Telugu Desam Party	3,51,013	60,571
Andhra Pradesh	21	Visakhapatnam	GEN	Daggubati Purandeswari	Indian National Congress	3,68,812	Palla Srinivasa Rao	Praja Rajyam Party	3,02,126	66,686
Andhra Pradesh	22	Anakapalli	GEN	Sabbam Hari	Indian National Congress	3,69,968	Nookarapu Surya Prakasa Rao	Telugu Desam Party	3,17,056	52,912
Andhra Pradesh	23	Kakinada	GEN	Mallipudi Mangapati Pallam Raju	Indian National Congress	3,23,607	Chalamalasetti Sunil	Praja Rajyam Party	2,89,563	34,044
Andhra Pradesh	24	Amalapuram	(SC)	G. V. Harsha Kumar	Indian National Congress	3,68,501	Pothula Prameela Devi	Praja Rajyam Party	3,28,496	40,005
Andhra Pradesh	25	Rajahmundry	GEN	Vundavalli Aruna Kumar	Indian National Congress	3,57,449	Murali Mohan	Telugu Desam Party	3,55,302	2,147
Andhra Pradesh	26	Narasapuram	GEN	Kanumuru Bapi Raju	Indian National Congress	3,89,422	Thota Seetharama Lakshmi	Telugu Desam Party	2,74,732	1,14,690
Andhra Pradesh	27	Eluru	GEN	Kavuri Samba Siva Rao	Indian National Congress	4,23,777	Maganti Venkateswara Rao	Telugu Desam Party	3,80,994	42,783
Andhra Pradesh	28	Machilipatnam	GEN	Konakalla Narayana Rao	Telugu Desam Party	4,09,936	Badiga Ramakrishna	Indian National Congress	3,97,480	12,456
Andhra Pradesh	29	Vijayawada	GEN	Lagadapati Rajagopal	Indian National Congress	4,29,394	Vallabhaneni Vamsi Mohan	Telugu Desam Party	4,16,682	12,712
Andhra Pradesh	30	Guntur	GEN	Rayapati Sambasiva Rao	Indian National Congress	4,03,937	Madala Rajendra	Telugu Desam Party	3,64,582	39,355
Andhra Pradesh	31	Narasaraopet	GEN	Modugula Venugopala Reddy	Telugu Desam Party	4,63,358	Vallabhaneni Balasouri	Indian National Congress	4,61,751	1,607
Andhra Pradesh	32	Bapatla	(SC)	Panabaka Lakshmi	Indian National Congress	4,60,757	Malyadri Sriram	Telugu Desam Party	3,91,419	69,338
Andhra Pradesh	33	Ongole	GEN	Magunta Sreenivasulu Reddy	Indian National Congress	4,50,442	Madduluri Malakondaiah Yadav	Telugu Desam Party	3,71,919	78,523
Andhra Pradesh	34	Nandyal	GEN	S. P. Y. Reddy	Indian National Congress	4,00,023	N. M. D. Farooq	Telugu Desam Party	3,09,176	90,847
Andhra Pradesh	35	Kurnool	GEN	Kotla Jayasurya Prakasha Reddy	Indian National Congress	3,82,668	B.T.Naidu	Telugu Desam Party	3,08,895	73,773
Andhra Pradesh	36	Anantapur	GEN	Anantha Venkatarami Reddy	Indian National Congress	4,57,876	Kalava Srinivasulu	Telugu Desam Party	3,79,955	77,921
Andhra Pradesh	37	Hindupur	GEN	Kristappa Nimmala	Telugu Desam Party	4,35,753	Khasim Khan	Indian National Congress	4,12,918	22,835
Andhra Pradesh	38	Kadapa	GEN	Y. S. Jagan Mohan Reddy	Indian National Congress	5,42,611	Palem Srikanth Reddy	Telugu Desam Party	3,63,765	1,78,846
Andhra Pradesh	39	Nellore	GEN	Mekapati Rajamohan Reddy	Indian National Congress	4,30,235	Vanteru Venu Gopala Reddy	Telugu Desam Party	3,75,242	54,993
Andhra Pradesh	40	Tirupati	(SC)	Chinta Mohan	Indian National Congress	4,28,403	Varla Ramaiah	Telugu Desam Party	4,09,127	19,276
Andhra Pradesh	41	Rajampet	GEN	Annayyagari Sai Prathap	Indian National Congress	4,23,910	Ramesh Kumar Reddy Reddappagari	Telugu Desam Party	1,80,537	1,10,377
Andhra Pradesh	42	Chittoor	(SC)	Naramalli Sivaprasad	Telugu Desam Party	4,34,376	M. Thippeswamy	Indian National Congress	4,23,717	10,659
Arunachal Pradesh	1	Arunachal West	(ST)	Takam Sanjoy	Indian National Congress	1,40,443	Kiren Rijiju	Bharatiya Janata Party	1,39,129	1,314
Arunachal Pradesh	2	Arunachal East	(ST)	Ninong Ering	Indian National Congress	1,15,423	Tapir Gao	Bharatiya Janata Party	46,974	68,449
Assam	1	Karimganj	(SC)	Lalit Mohan Suklabaidya	Indian National Congress	2,59,717	Rajesh Mallah	All India United Democratic Front	2,51,797	7,920
Assam	2	Silchar	GEN	Kabindra Purkayastha	Bharatiya Janata Party	2,43,532	Badruddin Ajmal	All India United Democratic Front	2,02,062	41,470
Assam	3	Autonomous District	(ST)	Biren Sing Engti	Indian National Congress	1,97,835	Elwin Teron	Autonomous State Demand Committee	1,23,287	74,548
Assam	4	Dhubri	GEN	Badruddin Ajmal	All India United Democratic Front	5,40,820	Anwar Hussain	Indian National Congress	3,56,401	1,84,419
Assam	5	Kokrajhar	(ST)	Sansuma Khunggur Bwiswmuthiary	Bodoland People's Front	4,95,211	Urkhao Gwra Brahma	Independent	3,04,889	1,90,322
Assam	6	Barpeta	GEN	Ismail Hussain	Indian National Congress	3,22,137	Bhupen Ray	Asom Gana Parishad	2,91,708	30,429
Assam	7	Gauhati	GEN	Bijoya Chakravarty	Bharatiya Janata Party	4,96,047	Robin Bordoloi	Indian National Congress	4,84,192	11,855
Assam	8	Mangaldoi	GEN	Ramen Deka	Bharatiya Janata Party	3,07,881	Madhab Rajbangshi	Indian National Congress	2,52,032	55,849
Assam	9	Tezpur	GEN	Joseph Toppo	Asom Gana Parishad	3,52,246	Moni Kumar Subba	Indian National Congress	3,22,093	30,153
Assam	10	Nowgong	GEN	Rajen Gohain	Bharatiya Janata Party	3,80,921	Anil Raja	Indian National Congress	3,35,541	45,380
Assam	11	Kaliabor	GEN	Dip Gogoi	Indian National Congress	4,34,676	Gunin Hazarika	Asom Gana Parishad	2,82,687	1,51,989
Assam	12	Jorhat	GEN	Bijoy Krishna Handique	Indian National Congress	3,62,320	Kamakhya Prasad Tasa	Bharatiya Janata Party	2,90,406	71,914
Assam	13	Dibrugarh	GEN	Paban Singh Ghatowar	Indian National Congress	3,59,163	Sarbananda Sonowal	Asom Gana Parishad	3,24,020	35,143
Assam	14	Lakhimpur	GEN	Ranee Narah	Indian National Congress	3,52,330	Arun Kumar Sarmah	Asom Gana Parishad	3,07,758	44,572
Bihar	1	Valmiki Nagar	GEN	Baidyanath Prasad Mahto	Janata Dal (United)	2,77,696	Fakhruddin	Independent	94,021	1,83,675
Bihar	2	Paschim Champaran	GEN	Sanjay Jaiswal	Bharatiya Janata Party	1,98,781	Prakash Jha	Lok Janshakti Party	1,51,438	47,343
Bihar	3	Purvi Champaran	GEN	Radha Mohan Singh	Bharatiya Janata Party	2,01,114	Akhilesh Prasad Singh	Rashtriya Janata Dal	1,21,824	79,290
Bihar	4	Sheohar	GEN	Rama Devi	Bharatiya Janata Party	2,33,499	Md Anwarul Haque	Bahujan Samaj Party	1,07,815	1,25,684
Bihar	5	Sitamarhi	GEN	Arjun Rai	Janata Dal (United)	2,32,782	Samir Kumar Mahaseth	Indian National Congress	1,22,216	1,10,566
Bihar	6	Madhubani	GEN	Hukmdev Narayan Yadav	Bharatiya Janata Party	1,64,094	Abdul Bari Siddiqui	Rashtriya Janata Dal	1,54,167	9,927
Bihar	7	Jhanjharpur	GEN	Mangani Lal Mandal	Janata Dal (United)	2,65,175	Devendra Prasad Yadav	Rashtriya Janata Dal	1,92,466	72,709
Bihar	8	Supaul	GEN	Vishwa Mohan Kumar	Janata Dal (United)	3,13,677	Ranjeet Ranjan	Indian National Congress	1,47,602	1,66,075
Bihar	9	Araria	GEN	Pradeep Kumar Singh	Bharatiya Janata Party	2,82,742	Zakir Hussain Khan	Lok Janshakti Party	2,60,240	22,502
Bihar	10	Kishanganj	GEN	Mohammad Asrarul Haque	Indian National Congress	2,39,405	Syed Mahmood Ashraf	Janata Dal (United)	1,59,136	80,269
Bihar	11	Katihar	GEN	Nikhil Kumar Choudhary	Bharatiya Janata Party	2,69,834	Tariq Anwar	Nationalist Congress Party	2,55,819	14,015
Bihar	12	Purnia	GEN	Uday Singh	Bharatiya Janata Party	3,62,952	Shanti Priya	Independent	1,76,725	1,86,227
Bihar	13	Madhepura	GEN	Sharad Yadav	Janata Dal (United)	3,70,585	Ravindra Charan Yadav	Rashtriya Janata Dal	1,92,964	1,77,621
Bihar	14	Darbhanga	GEN	Kirti Azad	Bharatiya Janata Party	2,39,268	Ali Ashraf Fatmi	Rashtriya Janata Dal	1,92,815	46,453
Bihar	15	Muzaffarpur	GEN	Jai Narain Prasad Nishad	Janata Dal (United)	1,95,091	Bhagwanlal Sahni	Lok Janshakti Party	1,47,282	47,809
Bihar	16	Vaishali	GEN	Raghuvansh Prasad Singh	Rashtriya Janata Dal	2,84,479	Vijay Kumar Shukla	Janata Dal (United)	2,62,171	22,308
Bihar	17	Gopalganj	(SC)	Purnmasi Ram	Janata Dal (United)	2,00,024	Anil Kumar	Rashtriya Janata Dal	1,57,552	42,472
Bihar	18	Siwan	GEN	Om Prakash Yadav	Independent	2,36,194	Hena Shahab	Rashtriya Janata Dal	1,72,764	63,430
Bihar	19	Maharajganj	GEN	Umashanker Singh	Rashtriya Janata Dal	2,11,610	Prabhunath Singh	Janata Dal (United)	2,08,813	2,797
Bihar	20	Saran	GEN	Lalu Prasad Yadav	Rashtriya Janata Dal	2,74,209	Rajiv Pratap Rudy	Bharatiya Janata Party	2,22,394	51,815
Bihar	21	Hajipur	(SC)	Ram Sundar Das	Janata Dal (United)	2,46,715	Ram Vilas Paswan	Lok Janshakti Party	2,08,761	37,954
Bihar	22	Ujiarpur	GEN	Ashwamedh Devi	Janata Dal (United)	1,80,082	Alok Kumar Mehta	Rashtriya Janata Dal	1,54,770	25,312
Bihar	23	Samastipur	(SC)	Maheshwar Hazari	Janata Dal (United)	2,59,458	Ram Chandra Paswan	Lok Janshakti Party	1,55,082	1,04,376
Bihar	24	Begusarai	GEN	Monazir Hassan	Janata Dal (United)	2,05,680	Shatrughna Prasad Singh	Communist Party of India	1,64,843	40,837
Bihar	25	Khagaria	GEN	Dinesh Chandra Yadav	Janata Dal (United)	2,66,964	Ravindar Rana	Rashtriya Janata Dal	1,28,209	1,38,755
Bihar	26	Bhagalpur	GEN	Syed Shahnawaz Hussain	Bharatiya Janata Party	2,28,384	Shakuni Choudhary	Rashtriya Janata Dal	1,72,573	55,811
Bihar	27	Banka	GEN	Digvijay Singh	Independent	1,85,762	Jay Prakash Narayan Yadav	Rashtriya Janata Dal	1,57,046	28,716
Bihar	28	Munger	GEN	Rajiv Ranjan Singh	Janata Dal (United)	3,74,317	Ram Badan Roy	Rashtriya Janata Dal	1,84,956	1,89,361
Bihar	29	Nalanda	GEN	Kaushalendra Kumar	Janata Dal (United)	2,99,155	Satish Kumar	Lok Janshakti Party	1,46,478	1,52,677
Bihar	30	Patna Sahib	GEN	Shatrughan Sinha	Bharatiya Janata Party	3,16,549	Vijay Kumar	Rashtriya Janata Dal	1,49,779	1,66,770
Bihar	31	Pataliputra	GEN	Ranjan Prasad Yadav	Janata Dal (United)	2,69,298	Lalu Prasad Yadav	Rashtriya Janata Dal	2,45,757	23,541
Bihar	32	Arrah	GEN	Meena Singh	Janata Dal (United)	2,12,726	Rama Kishore Singh	Lok Janshakti Party	1,38,006	74,720
Bihar	33	Buxar	GEN	Jagada Nand Singh	Rashtriya Janata Dal	1,32,614	Lalmuni Chaubey	Bharatiya Janata Party	1,30,376	2,238
Bihar	34	Sasaram	(SC)	Meira Kumar	Indian National Congress	1,92,213	Muni Lall	Bharatiya Janata Party	1,49,259	42,954
Bihar	35	Karakat	GEN	Mahabali Singh	Janata Dal (United)	1,96,946	Kanti Singh	Rashtriya Janata Dal	1,76,463	20,483
Bihar	36	Jahanabad	GEN	Jagdish Sharma	Janata Dal (United)	2,34,769	Surendra Yadav	Rashtriya Janata Dal	2,13,442	21,327
Bihar	37	Aurangabad	GEN	Sushil Kumar Singh	Janata Dal (United)	2,60,153	Shakil Ahmad Khan	Rashtriya Janata Dal	1,88,095	72,058
Bihar	38	Gaya	(SC)	Hari Manjhi	Bharatiya Janata Party	2,46,255	Ramji Manjhi	Rashtriya Janata Dal	1,83,802	62,453
Bihar	39	Nawada	GEN	Bhola Singh	Bharatiya Janata Party	1,30,608	Veena Devi	Lok Janshakti Party	95,691	34,917
Bihar	40	Jamui	(SC)	Bhudeo Choudhary	Janata Dal (United)	1,78,560	Shyam Rajak	Rashtriya Janata Dal	1,48,763	29,797
Chandigarh	1	Chandigarh	GEN	Pawan Kumar Bansal	Indian National Congress	1,61,042	Satya Pal Jain	Bharatiya Janata Party	1,02,075	58,967
Chhattisgarh	1	Sarguja	(ST)	Murarilal Singh	Bharatiya Janata Party	4,16,532	Bhanu Pratap Singh	Indian National Congress	2,56,984	1,59,548
Chhattisgarh	2	Raigarh	(ST)	Vishnu Deo Sai	Bharatiya Janata Party	4,43,948	Hridayaram Rathiya	Indian National Congress	3,88,100	55,848
Chhattisgarh	3	Janjgir-Champa	(SC)	Kamla Devi Patle	Bharatiya Janata Party	3,02,142	Shiv Kumar Dahariya	Indian National Congress	2,14,931	87,211
Chhattisgarh	4	Korba	GEN	Charan Das Mahant	Indian National Congress	3,14,616	Karuna Shukla	Bharatiya Janata Party	2,93,879	20,737
Chhattisgarh	5	Bilaspur	GEN	Dilip Singh Judeo	Bharatiya Janata Party	3,47,930	Renu Jogi	Indian National Congress	3,27,791	20,139
Chhattisgarh	6	Rajnandgaon	GEN	Madhusudan Yadav	Bharatiya Janata Party	4,37,721	Devwrat Singh	Indian National Congress	3,18,647	1,19,074
Chhattisgarh	7	Durg	GEN	Saroj Pandey	Bharatiya Janata Party	2,83,170	Pradeep Choubey	Indian National Congress	2,73,216	9,954
Chhattisgarh	8	Raipur	GEN	Ramesh Bais	Bharatiya Janata Party	3,64,943	Bhupesh Baghel	Indian National Congress	3,07,042	57,901
Chhattisgarh	9	Mahasamund	GEN	Chandu Lal Sahu	Bharatiya Janata Party	3,71,201	Motilal Sahu	Indian National Congress	3,19,726	51,475
Chhattisgarh	10	Bastar	(ST)	Baliram Kashyap	Bharatiya Janata Party	2,49,373	Shankar Sodi	Indian National Congress	1,49,111	1,00,262
Chhattisgarh	11	Kanker	(ST)	Sohan Potai	Bharatiya Janata Party	3,41,131	Phulo Devi Netam	Indian National Congress	3,21,843	19,288
Dadra and Nagar Haveli	1	Dadra And Nagar Haveli	(ST)	Natubhai Gomanbhai Patel	Bharatiya Janata Party	51,242	Mohanbhai Sanjibhai Delkar	Indian National Congress	50,624	618
Daman and Diu	1	Daman and Diu	GEN	Lalubhai Patel	Bharatiya Janata Party	44,546	Dahyabhai Vallabhbhai Patel	Indian National Congress	19,708	24,838
Delhi	1	Chandni Chowk	GEN	Kapil Sibal	Indian National Congress	4,65,713	Vijender Gupta	Bharatiya Janata Party	2,65,003	2,00,710
Delhi	2	North East Delhi	GEN	Jai Parkash Aggarwal	Indian National Congress	5,18,191	B. L. Sharma	Bharatiya Janata Party	2,95,948	2,22,243
Delhi	3	East Delhi	GEN	Sandeep Dikshit	Indian National Congress	5,18,001	Chetan Chauhan	Bharatiya Janata Party	2,76,948	2,41,053
Delhi	4	New Delhi	GEN	Ajay Maken	Indian National Congress	4,55,867	Vijay Goel	Bharatiya Janata Party	2,68,058	1,87,809
Delhi	5	North West Delhi	(SC)	Krishna Tirath	Indian National Congress	4,87,404	Meera Kanwaria	Bharatiya Janata Party	3,02,971	1,84,433
Delhi	6	West Delhi	GEN	Mahabal Mishra	Indian National Congress	4,79,899	Jagdish Mukhi	Bharatiya Janata Party	3,50,889	1,29,010
Delhi	7	South Delhi	GEN	Ramesh Kumar	Indian National Congress	3,60,278	Ramesh Bidhuri	Bharatiya Janata Party	2,67,059	93,219
Goa	1	North Goa	GEN	Shripad Yesso Naik	Bharatiya Janata Party	1,37,716	Jitendra Raghuraj Deshprabhu	Nationalist Congress Party	1,31,363	6,353
Goa	2	South Goa	GEN	Francisco Sardinha	Indian National Congress	1,27,494	Narendra Keshav Sawaikar	Bharatiya Janata Party	1,14,978	12,516
Gujarat	1	Kachchh	(SC)	Poonamben Jat	Bharatiya Janata Party	2,85,300	Valjibhai Danicha	Indian National Congress	2,13,957	71,343
Gujarat	2	Banaskantha	GEN	Mukesh Gadhvi	Indian National Congress	2,89,409	Haribhai Parthibhai Chaudhary	Bharatiya Janata Party	2,79,108	10,301
Gujarat	3	Patan	GEN	Jagdish Thakor	Indian National Congress	2,83,778	Bhavsinh Rathod	Bharatiya Janata Party	2,65,274	18,504
Gujarat	4	Mahesana	GEN	Jayshreeben Patel	Bharatiya Janata Party	3,34,631	Jivabhai Ambalal Patel	Indian National Congress	3,12,766	21,865
Gujarat	5	Sabarkantha	GEN	Mahendrasinh Chauhan	Bharatiya Janata Party	3,37,432	Madhusudan Mistry	Indian National Congress	3,20,272	17,160
Gujarat	6	Gandhinagar	GEN	L. K. Advani	Bharatiya Janata Party	4,34,044	Sureshkumar Chaturdas Patel	Indian National Congress	3,12,297	1,21,747
Gujarat	7	Ahmedabad East	GEN	Harin Pathak	Bharatiya Janata Party	3,18,846	Deepakbhai Babariya	Indian National Congress	2,32,790	86,056
Gujarat	8	Ahmedabad West	(SC)	Kirit Solanki	Bharatiya Janata Party	3,76,823	Shailesh Parmar	Indian National Congress	2,85,696	91,127
Gujarat	9	Surendranagar	GEN	Somabhai Patel	Indian National Congress	2,47,710	Laljibhai Mer	Bharatiya Janata Party	2,42,879	4,831
Gujarat	10	Rajkot	GEN	Kunwarjibhai Bavaliya	Indian National Congress	3,07,553	Kiran Kumar Patel	Bharatiya Janata Party	2,82,818	24,735
Gujarat	11	Porbandar	GEN	Vitthal Radadiya	Indian National Congress	3,29,436	Mansukhbhai Shamjibhai Kachariya	Bharatiya Janata Party	2,89,933	39,503
Gujarat	12	Jamnagar	GEN	Vikrambhai Arjanbhai Madam	Indian National Congress	2,81,410	Rameshbhai Mungra	Bharatiya Janata Party	2,54,992	26,418
Gujarat	13	Junagadh	GEN	Dinubhai Solanki	Bharatiya Janata Party	3,55,335	Jashubhai Barad	Indian National Congress	3,41,576	13,759
Gujarat	14	Amreli	GEN	Naranbhai Kachhadia	Bharatiya Janata Party	2,47,666	Nilaben Thummar	Indian National Congress	2,10,349	37,317
Gujarat	15	Bhavnagar	GEN	Rajendrasinh Rana	Bharatiya Janata Party	2,13,376	Mahavirsinh Gohil	Indian National Congress	2,07,483	5,893
Gujarat	16	Anand	GEN	Bharatsinh Solanki	Indian National Congress	3,48,655	Dipakbhai Patel	Bharatiya Janata Party	2,81,337	67,318
Gujarat	17	Kheda	GEN	Dinsha Patel	Indian National Congress	2,84,004	Devusinh Chauhan	Bharatiya Janata Party	2,83,158	846
Gujarat	18	Panchmahal	GEN	Prabhatsinh Pratapsinh Chauhan	Bharatiya Janata Party	2,82,079	Shankersinh Vaghela	Indian National Congress	2,79,998	2,081
Gujarat	19	Dahod	(ST)	Prabha Kishor Taviad	Indian National Congress	2,50,586	Somjibhai Damor	Bharatiya Janata Party	1,92,050	58,536
Gujarat	20	Vadodara	GEN	Balkrishna Khanderao Shukla	Bharatiya Janata Party	4,28,833	Satyajitsinh Gaekwad	Indian National Congress	2,92,805	1,36,028
Gujarat	21	Chhota Udaipur	(ST)	Ramsinh Rathwa	Bharatiya Janata Party	3,53,534	Naranbhai Rathwa	Indian National Congress	3,26,536	26,998
Gujarat	22	Bharuch	GEN	Mansukhbhai Vasava	Bharatiya Janata Party	3,11,019	Aziz Tankarvi	Indian National Congress	2,83,787	27,232
Gujarat	23	Bardoli	(ST)	Tushar Amarsinh Chaudhary	Indian National Congress	3,98,430	Riteshkumar Vasava	Bharatiya Janata Party	3,39,445	58,985
Gujarat	24	Surat	GEN	Darshana Jardosh	Bharatiya Janata Party	3,64,947	Dhirubhai Haribhai Gajera	Indian National Congress	2,90,149	74,798
Gujarat	25	Navsari	GEN	C. R. Patil	Bharatiya Janata Party	4,23,413	Dhansukh Rajput	Indian National Congress	2,90,770	1,32,643
Gujarat	26	Valsad	(ST)	Kishanbhai Vestabhai Patel	Indian National Congress	3,57,755	DC Patel	Bharatiya Janata Party	3,50,586	7,169
Haryana	1	Ambala	(SC)	Kumari Selja	Indian National Congress	3,22,258	Rattan Lal Kataria	Bharatiya Janata Party	3,07,688	14,570
Haryana	2	Kurukshetra	GEN	Naveen Jindal	Indian National Congress	3,97,204	Ashok Kumar Arora	Indian National Lok Dal	2,78,475	1,18,729
Haryana	3	Sirsa	(SC)	Ashok Tanwar	Indian National Congress	4,15,584	Sita Ram	Indian National Lok Dal	3,80,085	35,499
Haryana	4	Hisar	GEN	Bhajan Lal	Haryana Janhit Congress (BL)	2,48,476	Sampat Singh	Indian National Lok Dal	2,41,493	6,983
Haryana	5	Karnal	GEN	Arvind Kumar Sharma	Indian National Congress	3,04,698	Maratha Virender Verma	Bahujan Samaj Party	2,28,352	76,346
Haryana	6	Sonipat	GEN	Jitender Singh Malik	Indian National Congress	3,38,795	Kishan Singh Sangwan	Bharatiya Janata Party	1,77,511	1,61,284
Haryana	7	Rohtak	GEN	Deepender Singh Hooda	Indian National Congress	5,85,016	Nafe Singh Rathee	Indian National Lok Dal	1,39,280	4,45,736
Haryana	8	Bhiwani–Mahendragarh	GEN	Shruti Choudhry	Indian National Congress	3,02,817	Ajay Singh Chautala	Indian National Lok Dal	2,47,240	55,577
Haryana	9	Gurgaon	GEN	Rao Inderjit Singh	Indian National Congress	2,78,516	Zakir Hussain	Bahujan Samaj Party	1,93,652	84,864
Haryana	10	Faridabad	GEN	Avtar Singh Bhadana	Indian National Congress	2,57,864	Ram Chander Bainda	Bharatiya Janata Party	1,89,663	68,201
Himachal Pradesh	1	Kangra	GEN	Rajan Sushant	Bharatiya Janata Party	3,22,254	Chander Kumar	Indian National Congress	3,01,475	20,779
Himachal Pradesh	2	Mandi	GEN	Virbhadra Singh	Indian National Congress	3,40,973	Maheshwar Singh	Bharatiya Janata Party	3,26,976	13,997
Himachal Pradesh	3	Hamirpur	GEN	Anurag Thakur	Bharatiya Janata Party	3,73,598	Narinder Thakur	Indian National Congress	3,00,866	72,732
Himachal Pradesh	4	Shimla	(SC)	Virender Kashyap	Bharatiya Janata Party	3,10,946	Dhani Ram Shandil	Indian National Congress	2,83,619	27,327
Jammu and Kashmir	1	Baramulla	GEN	Sharifuddin Shariq	Jammu & Kashmir National Conference	2,03,022	Mohammad Dilawar Mir	Jammu and Kashmir Peoples Democratic Party	1,38,208	64,814
Jammu and Kashmir	2	Srinagar	GEN	Farooq Abdullah	Jammu & Kashmir National Conference	1,47,035	Iftikhar Hussain Ansari	Jammu and Kashmir Peoples Democratic Party	1,16,793	30,242
Jammu and Kashmir	3	Anantnag	GEN	Mirza Mehboob Beg	Jammu & Kashmir National Conference	1,48,317	Peer Mohd Hussain	Jammu and Kashmir Peoples Democratic Party	1,43,093	5,224
Jammu and Kashmir	4	Ladakh	GEN	Hassan Khan	Independent	32,701	Phuntsog Namgyal	Indian National Congress	29,017	3,684
Jammu and Kashmir	5	Udhampur	GEN	Chaudhary Lal Singh	Indian National Congress	2,31,853	Nirmal Singh	Bharatiya Janata Party	2,18,459	13,394
Jammu and Kashmir	6	Jammu	GEN	Madan Lal Sharma	Indian National Congress	3,82,305	Lila Karan Sharma	Bharatiya Janata Party	2,60,932	1,21,373
Jharkhand	1	Rajmahal	(ST)	Devidhan Besra	Bharatiya Janata Party	1,68,357	Hemlal Murmu	Jharkhand Mukti Morcha	1,59,374	8,983
Jharkhand	2	Dumka	(ST)	Shibu Soren	Jharkhand Mukti Morcha	2,08,518	Sunil Soren	Bharatiya Janata Party	1,89,706	18,812
Jharkhand	3	Godda	GEN	Nishikant Dubey	Bharatiya Janata Party	1,89,526	Furkan Ansari	Indian National Congress	1,83,119	6,407
Jharkhand	4	Chatra	GEN	Inder Singh Namdhari	Independent	1,08,336	Dhiraj Prasad Sahu	Indian National Congress	92,158	16,178
Jharkhand	5	Kodarma	GEN	Babulal Marandi	Jharkhand Vikas Morcha (Prajatantrik)	1,99,462	Raj Kumar Yadav	Communist Party of India (Marxist–Leninist) Liberation	1,50,942	48,520
Jharkhand	6	Giridih	GEN	Ravindra Kumar Pandey	Bharatiya Janata Party	2,33,435	Tek Lal Mahto	Jharkhand Mukti Morcha	1,38,697	94,738
Jharkhand	7	Dhanbad	GEN	Pashupati Nath Singh	Bharatiya Janata Party	2,60,521	Chandra Shekhar Dubey	Indian National Congress	2,02,474	58,047
Jharkhand	8	Ranchi	GEN	Subodh Kant Sahay	Indian National Congress	3,10,499	Ram Tahal Choudhary	Bharatiya Janata Party	2,97,149	13,350
Jharkhand	9	Jamshedpur	GEN	Arjun Munda	Bharatiya Janata Party	3,19,620	Suman Mahato	Jharkhand Mukti Morcha	1,99,957	1,19,663
Jharkhand	10	Singhbhum	(ST)	Madhu Koda	Independent	2,56,827	Barkuwar Gagrai	Bharatiya Janata Party	1,67,154	89,673
Jharkhand	11	Khunti	(ST)	Kariya Munda	Bharatiya Janata Party	2,10,214	Neil Tirkey	Indian National Congress	1,30,039	80,175
Jharkhand	12	Lohardaga	(ST)	Sudarshan Bhagat	Bharatiya Janata Party	1,44,628	Chamra Linda	Independent	1,36,345	8,283
Jharkhand	13	Palamau	(SC)	Kameshwar Baitha	Jharkhand Mukti Morcha	1,67,995	Ghuran Ram	Rashtriya Janata Dal	1,44,457	23,538
Jharkhand	14	Hazaribagh	GEN	Yashwant Sinha	Bharatiya Janata Party	2,19,810	Saurabh Narain Singh	Indian National Congress	1,79,646	40,164
Karnataka	1	Chikkodi	GEN	Ramesh Katti	Bharatiya Janata Party	4,38,081	Prakash Hukkeri	Indian National Congress	3,82,794	55,287
Karnataka	2	Belgaum	GEN	Suresh Angadi	Bharatiya Janata Party	3,84,324	Amarsinh Vasantrao Patil	Indian National Congress	2,65,637	1,18,687
Karnataka	3	Bagalkot	GEN	P. C. Gaddigoudar	Bharatiya Janata Party	4,13,272	J. T. Patil	Indian National Congress	3,77,826	35,446
Karnataka	4	Bijapur	(SC)	Ramesh Jigajinagi	Bharatiya Janata Party	3,08,939	Prakash Rathod	Indian National Congress	2,66,535	42,404
Karnataka	5	Gulbarga	(SC)	Mallikarjun Kharge	Indian National Congress	3,45,241	Revu Naik Belamgi	Bharatiya Janata Party	3,31,837	13,404
Karnataka	6	Raichur	(ST)	Sanna Pakirappa	Bharatiya Janata Party	3,16,450	Raja Venkatappa Naik	Indian National Congress	2,85,814	30,636
Karnataka	7	Bidar	GEN	Dharam Singh	Indian National Congress	3,37,957	Gurupadappa Nagamarapalli	Bharatiya Janata Party	2,98,338	39,619
Karnataka	8	Koppal	GEN	Shivaramagouda Shivanagouda	Bharatiya Janata Party	2,91,693	Basavaraj Rayareddy	Indian National Congress	2,91,693	81,789
Karnataka	9	Bellary	(ST)	J. Shantha	Bharatiya Janata Party	4,02,213	N. Y. Hanumanthappa	Indian National Congress	3,99,970	2,243
Karnataka	10	Haveri	GEN	Shivkumar Chanabasappa Udasi	Bharatiya Janata Party	4,30,293	Saleem Ahmed	Indian National Congress	3,42,373	87,920
Karnataka	11	Dharwad	GEN	Pralhad Joshi	Bharatiya Janata Party	4,46,786	Manjunath Kunnur	Indian National Congress	3,09,123	1,37,663
Karnataka	12	Uttara Kannada	GEN	Anant Kumar Hegde	Bharatiya Janata Party	3,39,300	Margaret Alva	Indian National Congress	3,16,531	22,769
Karnataka	13	Davanagere	GEN	G. M. Siddeshwara	Bharatiya Janata Party	4,23,447	SS Mallikarjuna	Indian National Congress	4,21,423	2,024
Karnataka	14	Shimoga	GEN	B. Y. Raghavendra	Bharatiya Janata Party	4,82,783	Sarekoppa Bangarappa	Indian National Congress	4,29,890	52,893
Karnataka	15	Udupi Chikmagalur	GEN	D. V. Sadananda Gowda	Bharatiya Janata Party	4,01,441	K. Jayaprakash Hegde	Indian National Congress	3,74,423	27,018
Karnataka	16	Hassan	GEN	H. D. Deve Gowda	Janata Dal (Secular)	4,96,429	K H Hanume Gowda	Bharatiya Janata Party	2,05,316	2,91,113
Karnataka	17	Dakshina Kannada	GEN	Nalin Kumar Kateel	Bharatiya Janata Party	4,99,385	Janardhana Poojary	Indian National Congress	4,58,965	40,420
Karnataka	18	Chitradurga	(SC)	Janardhana Swamy	Bharatiya Janata Party	3,70,920	B Thippeswamy	Indian National Congress	2,35,349	1,35,571
Karnataka	19	Tumkur	GEN	G. S. Basavaraj	Bharatiya Janata Party	3,31,064	S. P. Muddahanumegowda	Janata Dal (Secular)	3,09,619	21,445
Karnataka	20	Mandya	GEN	N Cheluvaraya Swamy	Janata Dal (Secular)	3,84,443	Ambareesh	Indian National Congress	3,60,943	23,500
Karnataka	21	Mysore	GEN	Adagur H. Vishwanath	Indian National Congress	3,54,810	C. H. Vijayashankar	Bharatiya Janata Party	3,47,119	7,691
Karnataka	22	Chamarajanagar	(SC)	R. Dhruvanarayana	Indian National Congress	3,69,970	A R Krishnamurthy	Bharatiya Janata Party	3,65,968	4,002
Karnataka	23	Bangalore Rural	GEN	H. D. Kumaraswamy	Janata Dal (Secular)	4,93,302	C. P. Yogeeshwara	Bharatiya Janata Party	3,63,027	1,30,275
Karnataka	24	Bangalore North	GEN	D. B. Chandre Gowda	Bharatiya Janata Party	4,52,920	C. K. Jaffer Sharief	Indian National Congress	3,93,255	59,665
Karnataka	25	Bangalore Central	GEN	P. C. Mohan	Bharatiya Janata Party	3,40,162	H. T. Sangliana	Indian National Congress	3,04,944	35,218
Karnataka	26	Bangalore South	GEN	Ananth Kumar	Bharatiya Janata Party	4,37,953	Krishna Byre Gowda	Indian National Congress	4,00,341	37,612
Karnataka	27	Chikballapur	GEN	Veerappa Moily	Indian National Congress	3,90,500	C Aswathanarayana	Bharatiya Janata Party	3,39,119	51,381
Karnataka	28	Kolar	GEN	K. H. Muniyappa	Indian National Congress	3,44,771	DS Veeraiah	Bharatiya Janata Party	3,21,765	23,006
Kerala	1	Kasaragod	GEN	P. Karunakaran	Communist Party of India (Marxist)	3,85,522	Shahida Kamal	Indian National Congress	3,21,095	64,427
Kerala	2	Kannur	GEN	K. Sudhakaran	Indian National Congress	4,32,878	K. K. Ragesh	Communist Party of India (Marxist)	3,89,727	43,151
Kerala	3	Vatakara	GEN	Mullappally Ramachandran	Indian National Congress	4,21,255	P Satheedevi	Communist Party of India (Marxist)	3,65,069	56,186
Kerala	4	Wayanad	GEN	M. I. Shanavas	Indian National Congress	4,10,703	M Rahmathulla	Communist Party of India	2,57,264	1,53,439
Kerala	5	Kozhikode	GEN	M. K. Raghavan	Indian National Congress	3,42,309	P. A. Mohammed Riyas	Communist Party of India (Marxist)	3,41,471	838
Kerala	6	Malappuram	GEN	E. Ahamed	Muslim League Kerala State Committee	4,27,940	T. K. Hamza	Communist Party of India (Marxist)	3,12,343	1,15,597
Kerala	7	Ponnani	GEN	E. T. Mohammed Basheer	Muslim League Kerala State Committee	3,85,801	Hussain Randathani	Independent	3,03,117	82,684
Kerala	8	Palakkad	GEN	M. B. Rajesh	Communist Party of India (Marxist)	3,38,070	Satheeshan Pacheni	Indian National Congress	3,36,250	1,820
Kerala	9	Alathur	(SC)	P. K. Biju	Communist Party of India (Marxist)	3,87,352	NK Sudheer	Indian National Congress	3,66,392	20,960
Kerala	10	Thrissur	GEN	P. C. Chacko	Indian National Congress	3,85,297	C. N. Jayadevan	Communist Party of India	3,60,146	25,151
Kerala	11	Chalakudy	GEN	K. P. Dhanapalan	Indian National Congress	3,99,035	UP Joseph	Communist Party of India (Marxist)	3,27,356	71,679
Kerala	12	Ernakulam	GEN	K. V. Thomas	Indian National Congress	3,42,845	Sindhu Joy	Communist Party of India (Marxist)	3,31,055	11,790
Kerala	13	Idukki	GEN	P. T. Thomas	Indian National Congress	4,08,484	Francis George	Kerala Congress	3,33,688	74,796
Kerala	14	Kottayam	GEN	Jose K. Mani	Kerala Congress (M)	4,04,962	K. Suresh Kurup	Communist Party of India (Marxist)	3,33,392	71,570
Kerala	15	Alappuzha	GEN	K. C. Venugopal	Indian National Congress	4,68,679	K. S. Manoj	Communist Party of India (Marxist)	4,11,044	57,635
Kerala	16	Mavelikkara	(SC)	Kodikunnil Suresh	Indian National Congress	3,97,211	RS Anil	Communist Party of India	3,49,163	48,048
Kerala	17	Pathanamthitta	GEN	Anto Antony	Indian National Congress	4,08,232	K Anantha Gopan	Communist Party of India (Marxist)	2,97,026	1,11,206
Kerala	18	Kollam	GEN	N. Peethambara Kurup	Indian National Congress	3,57,401	P. Rajendran	Communist Party of India (Marxist)	3,39,870	17,531
Kerala	19	Attingal	GEN	A Sampath	Communist Party of India (Marxist)	3,28,036	G Balachandran	Indian National Congress	3,09,695	18,341
Kerala	20	Thiruvananthapuram	GEN	Shashi Tharoor	Indian National Congress	3,26,725	P Ramachandran Nair	Communist Party of India (Marxist)	2,26,727	99,998
Lakshadweep	1	Lakshadweep	(ST)	Muhammed Hamdulla Sayeed	Indian National Congress	20,492	P. Pookunhi Koya	Nationalist Congress Party	18,294	2,198
Madhya Pradesh	1	Morena	GEN	Narendra Singh Tomar	Bharatiya Janata Party	3,00,647	Ramnivas Rawat	Indian National Congress	1,99,650	1,00,997
Madhya Pradesh	2	Bhind	(SC)	Ashok Argal	Bharatiya Janata Party	2,27,365	Bhagirath Prasad	Indian National Congress	2,08,479	18,886
Madhya Pradesh	3	Gwalior	GEN	Yashodhara Raje Scindia	Bharatiya Janata Party	2,52,314	Ashok Singh	Indian National Congress	2,25,723	26,591
Madhya Pradesh	4	Guna	GEN	Jyotiraditya Scindia	Indian National Congress	4,13,297	Narottam Mishra	Bharatiya Janata Party	1,63,560	2,49,737
Madhya Pradesh	5	Sagar	GEN	Bhupendra Singh	Bharatiya Janata Party	3,23,954	Aslam Sher Khan	Indian National Congress	1,92,786	1,31,168
Madhya Pradesh	6	Tikamgarh	(SC)	Virendra Kumar	Bharatiya Janata Party	2,00,109	Ahirwar Vrindavan	Indian National Congress	1,58,247	41,862
Madhya Pradesh	7	Damoh	GEN	Shivraj Singh Lodhi	Bharatiya Janata Party	3,02,673	Chandrabhan Bhaiya	Indian National Congress	2,31,796	70,877
Madhya Pradesh	8	Khajuraho	GEN	Jeetendra Singh Bundela	Bharatiya Janata Party	2,29,369	Raja Pateria	Indian National Congress	2,01,037	28,332
Madhya Pradesh	9	Satna	GEN	Ganesh Singh	Bharatiya Janata Party	1,94,624	Sukhlal Kushwaha	Bahujan Samaj Party	1,90,206	4,418
Madhya Pradesh	10	Rewa	GEN	Deoraj Singh Patel	Bahujan Samaj Party	1,72,002	Sundar Lal Tiwari	Indian National Congress	1,67,981	4,021
Madhya Pradesh	11	Sidhi	GEN	Govind Prasad Mishra	Bharatiya Janata Party	2,70,914	Indrajeet Kumar	Indian National Congress	2,25,174	45,740
Madhya Pradesh	12	Shahdol	(ST)	Rajesh Nandini Singh	Indian National Congress	2,63,434	Narendra Singh Maravi	Bharatiya Janata Party	2,50,019	13,415
Madhya Pradesh	13	Jabalpur	GEN	Rakesh Singh	Bharatiya Janata Party	3,43,922	Rameshwar Neekhra	Indian National Congress	2,37,919	1,06,003
Madhya Pradesh	14	Mandla	(ST)	Basori Singh Masram	Indian National Congress	3,91,133	Faggan Singh Kulaste	Bharatiya Janata Party	3,26,080	65,053
Madhya Pradesh	15	Balaghat	GEN	K. D. Deshmukh	Bharatiya Janata Party	2,99,959	Vishveshwar Bhagat	Indian National Congress	2,59,140	40,819
Madhya Pradesh	16	Chhindwara	GEN	Kamal Nath	Indian National Congress	4,09,736	Marot Rao Khavase	Bharatiya Janata Party	2,88,516	1,21,220
Madhya Pradesh	17	Narmadapuram	GEN	Uday Pratap Singh	Indian National Congress	3,39,496	Rampal Singh	Bharatiya Janata Party	3,20,251	19,245
Madhya Pradesh	18	Vidisha	GEN	Sushma Swaraj	Bharatiya Janata Party	4,38,235	Munvvar Saleem	Samajwadi Party	48,391	3,89,844
Madhya Pradesh	19	Bhopal	GEN	Kailash Joshi	Bharatiya Janata Party	3,35,678	Surendra Singh Thakur	Indian National Congress	2,70,521	65,157
Madhya Pradesh	20	Rajgarh	GEN	Narayan Singh Amlabe	Indian National Congress	3,19,371	Lakshman Singh	Bharatiya Janata Party	2,94,983	24,388
Madhya Pradesh	21	Dewas	(SC)	Sajjan Singh Verma	Indian National Congress	3,76,421	Thawar Chand Gehlot	Bharatiya Janata Party	3,60,964	15,457
Madhya Pradesh	22	Ujjain	(SC)	Premchand Guddu	Indian National Congress	3,26,905	Satyanarayan Jatiya	Bharatiya Janata Party	3,11,064	15,841
Madhya Pradesh	23	Mandsaur	GEN	Meenakshi Natarajan	Indian National Congress	3,73,532	Laxminarayan Pandey	Bharatiya Janata Party	3,42,713	30,819
Madhya Pradesh	24	Ratlam	(ST)	Kantilal Bhuria	Indian National Congress	3,08,923	Dileep Singh Bhuria	Bharatiya Janata Party	2,51,255	57,668
Madhya Pradesh	25	Dhar	(ST)	Gajendra Singh Rajukhedi	Indian National Congress	3,02,660	Mukam Singh Kirade	Bharatiya Janata Party	2,99,999	2,661
Madhya Pradesh	26	Indore	GEN	Sumitra Mahajan	Bharatiya Janata Party	3,88,662	Satyanarayan Patel	Indian National Congress	3,77,182	11,480
Madhya Pradesh	27	Khargone	(ST)	Makhansingh Solanki	Bharatiya Janata Party	3,51,296	Bala Bachchan	Indian National Congress	3,17,121	34,175
Madhya Pradesh	28	Khandwa	GEN	Arun Subhash Chandra Yadav	Indian National Congress	3,94,241	Nandkumar Singh Chauhan	Bharatiya Janata Party	3,45,160	49,081
Madhya Pradesh	29	Betul	(ST)	Jyoti Dhurve	Bharatiya Janata Party	3,34,939	Ojharam Evane	Indian National Congress	2,37,622	97,317
Maharashtra	1	Nandurbar	(ST)	Manikrao Hodlya Gavit	Indian National Congress	2,75,936	Sharad Gavit	Samajwadi Party	2,35,093	40,843
Maharashtra	2	Dhule	GEN	Pratap Narayanrao Sonawane	Bharatiya Janata Party	2,63,260	Amarishbhai Rasiklal Patel	Indian National Congress	2,43,841	19,419
Maharashtra	3	Jalgaon	GEN	AT Nana Patil	Bharatiya Janata Party	3,43,647	Vasantrao More	Nationalist Congress Party	2,47,627	96,020
Maharashtra	4	Raver	GEN	Haribhau Jawale	Bharatiya Janata Party	3,28,843	Ravindra Patil	Nationalist Congress Party	3,00,625	28,218
Maharashtra	5	Buldhana	GEN	Prataprao Ganpatrao Jadhav	Shiv Sena	3,53,671	Rajendra Shingne	Nationalist Congress Party	3,25,593	28,078
Maharashtra	6	Akola	GEN	Sanjay Shamrao Dhotre	Bharatiya Janata Party	2,87,526	Prakash Yashwant Ambedkar	Bharipa Bahujan Mahasangh	2,22,678	64,848
Maharashtra	7	Amravati	(SC)	Anandrao Vithoba Adsul	Shiv Sena	3,14,286	Rajendra Gavai	Republican Party of India (G)	2,52,570	61,716
Maharashtra	8	Wardha	GEN	Datta Meghe	Indian National Congress	3,52,853	Suresh Wagmare	Bharatiya Janata Party	2,56,935	95,918
Maharashtra	9	Ramtek	(SC)	Mukul Wasnik	Indian National Congress	3,11,614	Krupal Tumane	Shiv Sena	2,94,913	16,701
Maharashtra	10	Nagpur	GEN	Vilas Muttemwar	Indian National Congress	3,15,148	Banwarilal Purohit	Bharatiya Janata Party	2,90,749	24,399
Maharashtra	11	Bhandara-Gondiya	GEN	Praful Patel	Nationalist Congress Party	4,89,814	Nana Patole	Independent	2,37,899	2,51,915
Maharashtra	12	Gadchiroli-Chimur	(ST)	Marotrao Kowase	Indian National Congress	3,21,756	Ashok Nete	Bharatiya Janata Party	2,93,176	28,580
Maharashtra	13	Chandrapur	GEN	Hansraj Gangaram Ahir	Bharatiya Janata Party	3,01,467	Naresh Puglia	Indian National Congress	2,68,972	32,495
Maharashtra	14	Yavatmal-Washim	GEN	Bhavana Gawali	Shiv Sena	3,84,443	Harising Rathod	Indian National Congress	3,27,492	56,951
Maharashtra	15	Hingoli	GEN	Subhash Wankhede	Shiv Sena	3,40,148	Suryakanta Patil	Nationalist Congress Party	2,66,514	73,634
Maharashtra	16	Nanded	GEN	Bhaskarrao Khatgaonkar	Indian National Congress	3,46,400	Sambhaji Pawar	Bharatiya Janata Party	2,71,786	74,614
Maharashtra	17	Parbhani	GEN	Ganeshrao Dudhgaonkar	Shiv Sena	3,85,387	Suresh Warpudkar	Nationalist Congress Party	3,19,969	65,418
Maharashtra	18	Jalna	GEN	Raosaheb Danve	Bharatiya Janata Party	3,50,710	Kalyan Vaijinath Kale	Indian National Congress	3,42,228	8,482
Maharashtra	19	Aurangabad	GEN	Chandrakant Khaire	Shiv Sena	2,55,896	Uttamsingh Pawar	Indian National Congress	2,22,882	33,014
Maharashtra	20	Dindori	(ST)	Harischandra Devram Chavan	Bharatiya Janata Party	2,81,254	Zirwal Narhari Sitaram	Nationalist Congress Party	2,43,907	37,347
Maharashtra	21	Nashik	GEN	Sameer Bhujbal	Nationalist Congress Party	2,38,706	Hemant Godse	Maharashtra Navnirman Sena	2,16,674	22,032
Maharashtra	22	Palghar	(ST)	Baliram Jadhav	Bahujan Vikas Aaghadi	2,23,234	Chintaman Vanaga	Bharatiya Janata Party	2,10,874	12,360
Maharashtra	23	Bhiwandi	GEN	Suresh Kashinath Taware	Indian National Congress	1,82,789	Jagannath Patil	Bharatiya Janata Party	1,41,425	41,364
Maharashtra	24	Kalyan	GEN	Anand Paranjpe	Shiv Sena	2,12,476	Vasant Davkhare	Nationalist Congress Party	1,88,274	24,202
Maharashtra	25	Thane	GEN	Sanjeev Naik	Nationalist Congress Party	3,01,000	Vijay Chougule	Shiv Sena	2,51,980	49,020
Maharashtra	26	Mumbai North	GEN	Sanjay Nirupam	Indian National Congress	2,55,157	Ram Naik	Bharatiya Janata Party	2,49,378	5,779
Maharashtra	27	Mumbai North West	GEN	Gurudas Kamat	Indian National Congress	2,53,920	Gajanan Kirtikar	Shiv Sena	2,15,533	38,387
Maharashtra	28	Mumbai North East	GEN	Sanjay Dina Patil	Nationalist Congress Party	2,13,505	Kirit Somaiya	Bharatiya Janata Party	2,10,572	2,933
Maharashtra	29	Mumbai North Central	GEN	Priya Dutt	Indian National Congress	3,19,352	Mahesh Ram Jethmalani	Bharatiya Janata Party	1,44,797	1,74,555
Maharashtra	30	Mumbai South Central	GEN	Eknath Gaikwad	Indian National Congress	2,57,523	Suresh Anant Gambhir	Shiv Sena	1,81,817	75,706
Maharashtra	31	Mumbai South	GEN	Milind Deora	Indian National Congress	2,72,411	Bala Nandgaonkar	Maharashtra Navnirman Sena	1,59,729	1,12,682
Maharashtra	32	Raigad	GEN	Anant Geete	Shiv Sena	4,13,546	A. R. Antulay	Indian National Congress	2,67,025	1,46,521
Maharashtra	33	Maval	GEN	Gajanan Babar	Shiv Sena	3,64,857	Azam Pansare	Nationalist Congress Party	2,84,238	80,619
Maharashtra	34	Pune	GEN	Suresh Kalmadi	Indian National Congress	2,79,973	Anil Shirole	Bharatiya Janata Party	2,54,272	25,701
Maharashtra	35	Baramati	GEN	Supriya Sule	Nationalist Congress Party	4,87,827	Kanta Nalawade	Bharatiya Janata Party	1,50,996	3,36,831
Maharashtra	36	Shirur	GEN	Shivajirao Adhalarao Patil	Shiv Sena	4,82,563	Vilas Vithoba Lande	Nationalist Congress Party	3,03,952	1,78,611
Maharashtra	37	Ahmednagar	GEN	Dilip Kumar Gandhi	Bharatiya Janata Party	3,12,047	Kardile Shivaji Bhanudas	Nationalist Congress Party	2,65,316	46,731
Maharashtra	38	Shirdi	(SC)	Bhausaheb Wakchaure	Shiv Sena	3,59,921	Ramdas Athawale	Republican Party of India (A)	2,27,170	1,32,751
Maharashtra	39	Beed	GEN	Gopinath Munde	Bharatiya Janata Party	5,53,994	Rameshrao Baburao Kokate	Nationalist Congress Party	4,13,042	1,40,952
Maharashtra	40	Osmanabad	GEN	Padamsinha Patil	Nationalist Congress Party	4,08,840	Ravindra Gaikwad	Shiv Sena	4,02,053	6,787
Maharashtra	41	Latur	(SC)	Jaywantrao Awale	Indian National Congress	3,72,890	Sunil Gaikwad	Bharatiya Janata Party	3,64,915	7,975
Maharashtra	42	Solapur	(SC)	Sushilkumar Shinde	Indian National Congress	3,87,591	Sharad Bansode	Bharatiya Janata Party	2,87,959	99,632
Maharashtra	43	Madha	GEN	Sharad Pawar	Nationalist Congress Party	5,30,596	Subhash Sureshchandra Deshmukh	Bharatiya Janata Party	2,16,137	3,14,459
Maharashtra	44	Sangli	GEN	Pratik Patil	Indian National Congress	3,78,620	Ajitrao Shankarrao Ghorpade	Independent	3,38,837	39,783
Maharashtra	45	Satara	GEN	Udayanraje Bhosale	Nationalist Congress Party	5,32,583	Purushottam Bajirao Jadhav	Shiv Sena	2,35,068	2,97,515
Maharashtra	46	Ratnagiri-Sindhudurg	GEN	Nilesh Narayan Rane	Indian National Congress	3,53,915	Suresh Prabhu	Shiv Sena	3,07,165	46,750
Maharashtra	47	Kolhapur	GEN	Sadashivrao Mandlik	Independent	4,28,082	Sambhaji Raje	Nationalist Congress Party	3,83,282	44,800
Maharashtra	48	Hatkanangle	GEN	Raju Shetti	Swabhimani Paksha	4,81,025	Nivedita Mane	Nationalist Congress Party	3,85,965	95,060
Manipur	1	Inner Manipur	GEN	Thokchom Meinya	Indian National Congress	2,30,876	Moirangthem Nara	Communist Party of India	1,99,916	30,960
Manipur	2	Outer Manipur	(ST)	Thangso Baite	Indian National Congress	3,44,517	Mani Charenamei	People's Democratic Alliance	2,24,719	1,19,798
Meghalaya	1	Shillong	(ST)	Vincent Pala	Indian National Congress	2,32,270	John Filmore Kharshiing	United Democratic Party	1,24,402	1,07,868
Meghalaya	2	Tura	(ST)	Agatha Sangma	Nationalist Congress Party	1,54,476	Debora C Marak	Indian National Congress	1,36,531	17,945
Mizoram	1	Mizoram	(ST)	C. L. Ruala	Indian National Congress	2,13,779	H. Lallungmuana	Independent	1,04,824	1,08,955
Nagaland	1	Nagaland	(ST)	C. M. Chang	Naga People's Front	8,32,224	K. Asungba Sangtam	Indian National Congress	3,49,203	4,83,021
Odisha	1	Bargarh	GEN	Sanjay Bhoi	Indian National Congress	3,97,375	Hamid Hussain	Biju Janata Dal	2,98,931	98,444
Odisha	2	Sundargarh	(ST)	Hemananda Biswal	Indian National Congress	2,80,054	Jual Oram	Bharatiya Janata Party	2,68,430	11,624
Odisha	3	Sambalpur	GEN	Amarnath Pradhan	Indian National Congress	3,04,890	Rohit Pujari	Biju Janata Dal	2,90,016	14,874
Odisha	4	Keonjhar	(ST)	Yashbant Narayan Singh Laguri	Biju Janata Dal	3,89,104	Dhanurjaya Sidu	Indian National Congress	2,62,620	1,26,484
Odisha	5	Mayurbhanj	(ST)	Laxman Tudu	Biju Janata Dal	2,56,648	Sudam Marndi	Jharkhand Mukti Morcha	1,90,470	66,178
Odisha	6	Balasore	GEN	Srikant Kumar Jena	Indian National Congress	3,13,888	Arun Dey	Nationalist Congress Party	2,74,988	38,900
Odisha	7	Bhadrak	(SC)	Arjun Charan Sethi	Biju Janata Dal	4,16,808	Ananta Prasad Sethi	Indian National Congress	3,61,870	54,938
Odisha	8	Jajpur	(SC)	Mohan Jena	Biju Janata Dal	4,33,350	Amiya Kanta Mallik	Indian National Congress	3,05,603	1,27,747
Odisha	9	Dhenkanal	GEN	Tathagata Satpathy	Biju Janata Dal	3,98,568	Chandra Sekhar Tripathi	Indian National Congress	2,11,981	1,86,587
Odisha	10	Bolangir	GEN	Kalikesh Narayan Singh Deo	Biju Janata Dal	4,30,150	Narasingha Mishra	Indian National Congress	3,39,315	90,835
Odisha	11	Kalahandi	GEN	Bhakta Charan Das	Indian National Congress	4,01,736	Subash Chandra Nayak	Biju Janata Dal	2,47,699	1,54,037
Odisha	12	Nabarangpur	(ST)	Pradeep Kumar Majhi	Indian National Congress	3,08,307	Domburu Majhi	Biju Janata Dal	2,78,330	29,977
Odisha	13	Kandhamal	GEN	Rudra Madhab Ray	Biju Janata Dal	3,15,314	Suzit Kumar Padhi	Indian National Congress	1,64,307	1,51,007
Odisha	14	Cuttack	GEN	Bhartruhari Mahtab	Biju Janata Dal	4,65,089	Bibhuti Bhusan Mishra	Indian National Congress	2,28,797	2,36,292
Odisha	15	Kendrapara	GEN	Baijayant Panda	Biju Janata Dal	5,02,635	Ranjib Biswal	Indian National Congress	3,75,528	1,27,107
Odisha	16	Jagatsinghpur	(SC)	Bibhu Prasad Tarai	Communist Party of India	4,57,234	Rabindra Kumar Sethy	Indian National Congress	3,80,499	76,735
Odisha	17	Puri	GEN	Pinaki Misra	Biju Janata Dal	4,36,961	Debendra Nath Mansingh	Indian National Congress	2,25,656	2,11,305
Odisha	18	Bhubaneswar	GEN	Prasanna Kumar Patasani	Biju Janata Dal	4,00,472	Santosh Mohanty	Indian National Congress	1,47,712	2,52,760
Odisha	19	Aska	GEN	Nityananda Pradhan	Biju Janata Dal	4,19,862	Ramchandra Rath	Indian National Congress	1,87,028	2,32,834
Odisha	20	Berhampur	GEN	Siddhanta Mahapatra	Biju Janata Dal	3,19,839	Chandra Sekhar Sahu	Indian National Congress	2,62,552	57,287
Odisha	21	Koraput	(ST)	Jayaram Pangi	Biju Janata Dal	3,12,776	Giridhar Gamang	Indian National Congress	2,16,416	96,360
Puducherry	1	Puducherry	GEN	V. Narayanasamy	Indian National Congress	3,00,391	M. Ramadass	Pattali Makkal Katchi	2,08,619	91,772
Punjab	1	Gurdaspur	GEN	Partap Singh Bajwa	Indian National Congress	4,47,994	Vinod Khanna	Bharatiya Janata Party	4,39,652	8,342
Punjab	2	Amritsar	GEN	Navjot Singh Sidhu	Bharatiya Janata Party	3,92,046	Om Parkash Soni	Indian National Congress	3,85,188	6,858
Punjab	3	Khadoor Sahib	GEN	Rattan Singh Ajnala	Shiromani Akali Dal	4,67,980	Rana Gurjeet Singh	Indian National Congress	4,35,720	32,260
Punjab	4	Jalandhar	(SC)	Mohinder Singh Kaypee	Indian National Congress	4,08,103	Hans Raj Hans	Shiromani Akali Dal	3,71,658	36,445
Punjab	5	Hoshiarpur	(SC)	Santosh Chowdhary	Indian National Congress	3,58,812	Som Parkash	Bharatiya Janata Party	3,58,446	366
Punjab	6	Anandpur Sahib	GEN	Ravneet Singh Bittu	Indian National Congress	4,04,836	Daljit Singh Cheema	Shiromani Akali Dal	3,37,632	67,204
Punjab	7	Ludhiana	GEN	Manish Tewari	Indian National Congress	4,49,264	Gurcharan Singh Galib	Shiromani Akali Dal	3,35,558	1,13,706
Punjab	8	Fatehgarh Sahib	(SC)	Sukhdev Singh Libra	Indian National Congress	3,93,557	Charanjit Singh Atwal	Shiromani Akali Dal	3,59,258	34,299
Punjab	9	Faridkot	(SC)	Paramjit Kaur Gulshan	Shiromani Akali Dal	4,57,734	Sukhwinder Singh Danny	Indian National Congress	3,95,692	62,042
Punjab	10	Ferozepur	GEN	Sher Singh Ghubaya	Shiromani Akali Dal	4,50,900	Jagmeet Singh Brar	Indian National Congress	4,29,829	21,071
Punjab	11	Bathinda	GEN	Harsimrat Kaur Badal	Shiromani Akali Dal	5,29,472	Raninder Singh	Indian National Congress	4,08,524	1,20,948
Punjab	12	Sangrur	GEN	Vijay Inder Singla	Indian National Congress	3,58,670	Sukhdev Singh Dhindsa	Shiromani Akali Dal	3,17,798	40,872
Punjab	13	Patiala	GEN	Preneet Kaur	Indian National Congress	4,74,188	Prem Singh Chandumajra	Shiromani Akali Dal	3,76,799	97,389
Rajasthan	1	Ganganagar	(SC)	Bharat Ram Meghwal	Indian National Congress	4,76,554	Nihalchand	Bharatiya Janata Party	3,35,886	1,40,668
Rajasthan	2	Bikaner	(SC)	Arjun Ram Meghwal	Bharatiya Janata Party	2,44,537	Rewat Ram Panwar	Indian National Congress	2,24,962	19,575
Rajasthan	3	Churu	GEN	Ram Singh Kaswan	Bharatiya Janata Party	3,76,708	Rafique Mandelia	Indian National Congress	3,64,268	12,440
Rajasthan	4	Jhunjhunu	GEN	Sis Ram Ola	Indian National Congress	3,06,330	Dasrath Singh Shekhawat	Bharatiya Janata Party	2,40,998	65,332
Rajasthan	5	Sikar	GEN	Mahadeo Singh Khandela	Indian National Congress	3,24,812	Subhash Maharia	Bharatiya Janata Party	1,75,386	1,49,426
Rajasthan	6	Jaipur Rural	GEN	Lal Chand Kataria	Indian National Congress	2,78,266	Rao Rajendra Singh	Bharatiya Janata Party	2,26,029	52,237
Rajasthan	7	Jaipur	GEN	Mahesh Joshi	Indian National Congress	3,97,438	Ramcharan Bohra	Bharatiya Janata Party	3,81,339	16,099
Rajasthan	8	Alwar	GEN	Bhanwar Jitendra Singh	Indian National Congress	4,50,119	Kiran Yadav	Bharatiya Janata Party	2,93,500	1,56,619
Rajasthan	9	Bharatpur	(SC)	Ratan Singh	Indian National Congress	3,01,434	Khemchand	Bharatiya Janata Party	2,19,980	81,454
Rajasthan	10	Karauli–Dholpur	(SC)	Khiladi Lal Bairwa	Indian National Congress	2,15,810	Manoj Rajoria	Bharatiya Janata Party	1,86,087	29,723
Rajasthan	11	Dausa	(ST)	Kirodi Lal Meena	Independent	4,33,666	Qummer Rubbani	Independent	2,95,907	1,37,759
Rajasthan	12	Tonk–Sawai Madhopur	GEN	Namo Narain Meena	Indian National Congress	3,75,572	Kirori Singh Bainsla	Bharatiya Janata Party	3,75,255	317
Rajasthan	13	Ajmer	GEN	Sachin Pilot	Indian National Congress	4,05,575	Kiran Maheshwari	Bharatiya Janata Party	3,29,440	76,135
Rajasthan	14	Nagaur	GEN	Jyoti Mirdha	Indian National Congress	3,33,261	Bindu Chaudhary	Bharatiya Janata Party	1,78,124	1,55,137
Rajasthan	15	Pali	GEN	Badri Ram Jakhar	Indian National Congress	3,87,604	Pusp Jain	Bharatiya Janata Party	1,90,887	1,96,717
Rajasthan	16	Jodhpur	GEN	Chandresh Kumari Katoch	Indian National Congress	3,61,577	Jaswant Singh Bishnoi	Bharatiya Janata Party	2,63,248	98,329
Rajasthan	17	Barmer	GEN	Harish Chaudhary	Indian National Congress	4,16,497	Manvendra Singh	Bharatiya Janata Party	2,97,391	1,19,106
Rajasthan	18	Jalore	(SC)	Devji Patel	Bharatiya Janata Party	1,94,503	Buta Singh	Independent	1,44,698	49,805
Rajasthan	19	Udaipur	(ST)	Raghuveer Meena	Indian National Congress	4,11,510	Mahaveer Bhagora	Bharatiya Janata Party	2,46,585	1,64,925
Rajasthan	20	Banswara	(ST)	Tarachand Bhagora	Indian National Congress	4,13,169	Hakaru Maida	Bharatiya Janata Party	2,13,751	1,99,418
Rajasthan	21	Chittorgarh	GEN	Girija Vyas	Indian National Congress	3,99,663	Shrichand Kriplani	Bharatiya Janata Party	3,26,885	72,778
Rajasthan	22	Rajsamand	GEN	Gopal Singh Shekhawat	Indian National Congress	2,94,451	Rasa Singh Rawat	Bharatiya Janata Party	2,48,561	45,890
Rajasthan	23	Bhilwara	GEN	C. P. Joshi	Indian National Congress	4,13,128	V. P. Singh Badnore	Bharatiya Janata Party	2,77,760	1,35,368
Rajasthan	24	Kota	GEN	Ijyaraj Singh	Indian National Congress	3,60,486	Shyam Sharma	Bharatiya Janata Party	2,77,393	83,093
Rajasthan	25	Jhalawar–Baran	GEN	Dushyant Singh	Bharatiya Janata Party	4,29,096	Urmila Jain	Indian National Congress	3,76,255	52,841
Sikkim	1	Sikkim	GEN	Prem Das Rai	Sikkim Democratic Front	1,59,351	Kharananda Upreti	Indian National Congress	74,483	84,868
Tamil Nadu	1	Thiruvallur	(SC)	P Venugopal	All India Anna Dravida Munnetra Kazhagam	3,68,294	Gayathri S	Dravida Munnetra Kazhagam	3,36,621	31,673
Tamil Nadu	2	Chennai North	GEN	T. K. S. Elangovan	Dravida Munnetra Kazhagam	2,81,055	D. Pandian	Communist Party of India	2,61,902	19,153
Tamil Nadu	3	Chennai South	GEN	C. Rajendran	All India Anna Dravida Munnetra Kazhagam	3,08,567	R. S. Bharathi	Dravida Munnetra Kazhagam	2,75,632	32,935
Tamil Nadu	4	Chennai Central	GEN	Dayanidhi Maran	Dravida Munnetra Kazhagam	2,85,783	S.M.K Mogamed Ali Jinnah	All India Anna Dravida Munnetra Kazhagam	2,52,329	33,454
Tamil Nadu	5	Sriperumbudur	(SC)	T. R. Baalu	Dravida Munnetra Kazhagam	3,52,641	A. K. Moorthy	Pattali Makkal Katchi	3,27,605	25,036
Tamil Nadu	6	Kancheepuram	(SC)	P. Viswanathan	Indian National Congress	3,30,237	Ramakrishnan E	All India Anna Dravida Munnetra Kazhagam	3,17,134	13,103
Tamil Nadu	7	Arakkonam	(SC)	S. Jagathrakshakan	Dravida Munnetra Kazhagam	4,15,041	R. Velu	Pattali Makkal Katchi	3,05,245	1,09,796
Tamil Nadu	8	Vellore	(SC)	Abdul Rahman	Dravida Munnetra Kazhagam	3,60,474	L.K.M.B Vasu	All India Anna Dravida Munnetra Kazhagam	2,53,081	1,07,393
Tamil Nadu	9	Krishnagiri	GEN	E. G. Sugavanam	Dravida Munnetra Kazhagam	3,35,977	Nanjegowdu K	All India Anna Dravida Munnetra Kazhagam	2,59,379	76,598
Tamil Nadu	10	Dharmapuri	GEN	R. Thamaraiselvan	Dravida Munnetra Kazhagam	3,65,812	R. Senthil	Pattali Makkal Katchi	2,29,870	1,35,942
Tamil Nadu	11	Tiruvannamalai	GEN	D. Venugopal	Dravida Munnetra Kazhagam	4,36,866	Guru Gurunathan	Pattali Makkal Katchi	2,88,566	1,48,300
Tamil Nadu	12	Arani	GEN	M. Krishnasamy	Indian National Congress	3,96,728	N. Subramanian	All India Anna Dravida Munnetra Kazhagam	2,89,898	1,06,830
Tamil Nadu	13	Viluppuram	GEN	Anandan M	All India Anna Dravida Munnetra Kazhagam	3,06,826	Swamidurai K	Viduthalai Chiruthaigal Katchi	3,04,029	2,797
Tamil Nadu	14	Kallakurichi	GEN	Adhi Sankar	Dravida Munnetra Kazhagam	3,63,601	K. Dhanaraju	Pattali Makkal Katchi	2,54,993	1,08,608
Tamil Nadu	15	Salem	GEN	S. Semmalai	All India Anna Dravida Munnetra Kazhagam	3,80,460	K. V. Thangkabalu	Indian National Congress	3,33,969	46,491
Tamil Nadu	16	Namakkal	GEN	S. Gandhiselvan	Dravida Munnetra Kazhagam	3,71,476	Vairam Tamilarasi	All India Anna Dravida Munnetra Kazhagam	2,69,045	1,02,431
Tamil Nadu	17	Erode	GEN	A. Ganeshamurthi	Marumalarchi Dravida Munnetra Kazhagam	2,84,148	E. V. K. S. Elangovan	Indian National Congress	2,34,812	49,336
Tamil Nadu	18	Tiruppur	GEN	C. Sivasamy	All India Anna Dravida Munnetra Kazhagam	2,95,731	S. K. Kharventhan	Indian National Congress	2,10,385	85,346
Tamil Nadu	19	Nilgiris	GEN	A. Raja	Dravida Munnetra Kazhagam	3,16,802	Krishnan C	Marumalarchi Dravida Munnetra Kazhagam	2,30,781	86,021
Tamil Nadu	20	Coimbatore	GEN	P. R. Natarajan	Communist Party of India (Marxist)	2,93,165	R. Prabhu	Indian National Congress	2,54,501	38,664
Tamil Nadu	21	Pollachi	GEN	K. Sugumar	All India Anna Dravida Munnetra Kazhagam	3,05,935	K. Shamugasundaram	Dravida Munnetra Kazhagam	2,59,910	46,025
Tamil Nadu	22	Dindigul	GEN	N. S. V. Chitthan	Indian National Congress	3,61,545	Baalasubramani P	All India Anna Dravida Munnetra Kazhagam	3,07,198	54,347
Tamil Nadu	23	Karur	GEN	M. Thambidurai	All India Anna Dravida Munnetra Kazhagam	3,80,542	K. C. Palanisamy	Dravida Munnetra Kazhagam	3,33,288	47,254
Tamil Nadu	24	Tiruchirappalli	GEN	P Kumar	All India Anna Dravida Munnetra Kazhagam	2,98,710	Sarubala R Thondaiman	Indian National Congress	2,94,375	4,335
Tamil Nadu	25	Perambalur	GEN	Napoleon D	Dravida Munnetra Kazhagam	3,98,742	Balasubramanian KK	All India Anna Dravida Munnetra Kazhagam	3,21,138	77,604
Tamil Nadu	26	Cuddalore	GEN	K. S. Alagiri	Indian National Congress	3,20,473	M. C. Sampath	All India Anna Dravida Munnetra Kazhagam	2,96,941	23,532
Tamil Nadu	27	Chidambaram	(SC)	Thol. Thirumavalavan	Viduthalai Chiruthaigal Katchi	4,28,804	E. Ponnuswamy	Pattali Makkal Katchi	3,29,721	99,083
Tamil Nadu	28	Mayiladuthurai	GEN	O. S. Manian	All India Anna Dravida Munnetra Kazhagam	3,64,089	Mani Shankar Aiyar	Indian National Congress	3,27,235	36,854
Tamil Nadu	29	Nagapattinam	(SC)	A. K. S. Vijayan	Dravida Munnetra Kazhagam	3,69,915	Selvaraj M	Communist Party of India	3,21,953	47,962
Tamil Nadu	30	Thanjavur	(SC)	S. S. Palanimanickam	Dravida Munnetra Kazhagam	4,08,343	Durai Balakrishnan	Marumalarchi Dravida Munnetra Kazhagam	3,06,556	1,01,787
Tamil Nadu	31	Sivaganga	GEN	P. Chidambaram	Indian National Congress	3,34,348	R. S. Raja Kannappan	All India Anna Dravida Munnetra Kazhagam	3,30,994	3,354
Tamil Nadu	32	Madurai	GEN	M. K. Alagiri	Dravida Munnetra Kazhagam	4,31,295	P. Mohan	Communist Party of India (Marxist)	2,90,310	1,40,985
Tamil Nadu	33	Theni	GEN	J. M. Aaroon Rashid	Indian National Congress	3,40,575	Thanga Tamil Selvan	All India Anna Dravida Munnetra Kazhagam	3,34,273	6,302
Tamil Nadu	34	Virudhunagar	GEN	Manickam Tagore	Indian National Congress	3,07,187	Vaiko	Marumalarchi Dravida Munnetra Kazhagam	2,91,423	15,764
Tamil Nadu	35	Ramanathapuram	GEN	J. K. Rithesh	Dravida Munnetra Kazhagam	2,94,945	Sathiamoorthy V	All India Anna Dravida Munnetra Kazhagam	2,25,030	69,915
Tamil Nadu	36	Thoothukkudi	GEN	S. R. Jeyadurai	Dravida Munnetra Kazhagam	3,11,017	Cynthia Pandian	All India Anna Dravida Munnetra Kazhagam	2,34,368	76,649
Tamil Nadu	37	Tenkasi	GEN	P. Lingam	Communist Party of India	2,81,174	Vellaipandi G	Indian National Congress	2,46,497	34,677
Tamil Nadu	38	Tirunelveli	GEN	S. S. Ramasubbu	Indian National Congress	2,74,932	K Annamalai	All India Anna Dravida Munnetra Kazhagam	2,53,629	21,303
Tamil Nadu	39	Kanyakumari	GEN	J. Helen Davidson	Dravida Munnetra Kazhagam	3,20,161	Pon Radhakrishnan	Bharatiya Janata Party	2,54,474	65,687
Tripura	1	Tripura West	GEN	Khagen Das	Communist Party of India (Marxist)	5,63,799	Sudip Roy Barman	Indian National Congress	3,15,250	2,48,549
Tripura	2	Tripura East	(ST)	Baju Ban Riyan	Communist Party of India (Marxist)	5,21,084	Diba Chandra Hrangkhawl	Indian National Congress	2,25,503	2,95,581
Uttar Pradesh	1	Saharanpur	GEN	Jagdish Singh Rana	Bahujan Samaj Party	3,54,807	Rasheed Masood	Samajwadi Party	2,69,934	84,873
Uttar Pradesh	2	Kairana	GEN	Begum Tabassum Hasan	Bahujan Samaj Party	2,83,259	Hukum Singh	Bharatiya Janata Party	2,60,796	22,463
Uttar Pradesh	3	Muzaffarnagar	GEN	Kadir Rana	Bahujan Samaj Party	2,75,318	Anuradha Choudhary	Rashtriya Lok Dal	2,54,720	20,598
Uttar Pradesh	4	Bijnor	GEN	Sanjay Singh Chauhan	Rashtriya Lok Dal	2,44,587	Shahid Siddiqui	Bahujan Samaj Party	2,16,157	28,430
Uttar Pradesh	5	Nagina	(SC)	Yashvir Singh	Samajwadi Party	2,34,815	Ram Kishan Singh	Bahujan Samaj Party	1,75,127	59,688
Uttar Pradesh	6	Moradabad	GEN	Mohammad Azharuddin	Indian National Congress	3,01,283	Kunwar Sarvesh Kumar Singh	Bharatiya Janata Party	2,52,176	49,107
Uttar Pradesh	7	Rampur	GEN	Jaya Prada	Samajwadi Party	2,30,724	Begum Noor Bano	Indian National Congress	1,99,793	30,931
Uttar Pradesh	8	Sambhal	GEN	Shafiqur Rahman Barq	Bahujan Samaj Party	2,07,422	Iqbal Mehmood	Samajwadi Party	1,93,958	13,464
Uttar Pradesh	9	Amroha	GEN	Devendra Nagpal	Rashtriya Lok Dal	2,83,182	Mehboob Ali	Samajwadi Party	1,91,099	92,083
Uttar Pradesh	10	Meerut	GEN	Rajendra Agrawal	Bharatiya Janata Party	2,32,137	Malook Nagar	Bahujan Samaj Party	1,84,991	47,146
Uttar Pradesh	11	Baghpat	GEN	Ajit Singh	Rashtriya Lok Dal	2,38,638	Mukesh Sharma	Bahujan Samaj Party	1,75,611	63,027
Uttar Pradesh	12	Ghaziabad	GEN	Rajnath Singh	Bharatiya Janata Party	3,59,637	Surendra Prakash Goel	Indian National Congress	2,68,956	90,681
Uttar Pradesh	13	Gautam Buddh Nagar	GEN	Surendra Singh Nagar	Bahujan Samaj Party	2,45,613	Mahesh Sharma	Bharatiya Janata Party	2,29,709	15,904
Uttar Pradesh	14	Bulandshahr	(SC)	Kamlesh Balmiki	Samajwadi Party	2,36,257	Ashok Kumar Pradhan	Bharatiya Janata Party	1,70,192	66,065
Uttar Pradesh	15	Aligarh	GEN	Raj Kumari Chauhan	Bahujan Samaj Party	1,93,444	Zafar Alam	Samajwadi Party	1,76,887	16,557
Uttar Pradesh	16	Hathras	(SC)	Sarika Singh	Rashtriya Lok Dal	2,47,927	Rajendra Kumar	Bahujan Samaj Party	2,11,075	36,852
Uttar Pradesh	17	Mathura	GEN	Jayant Chaudhary	Rashtriya Lok Dal	3,79,870	Shyam Sunder Sharma	Bahujan Samaj Party	2,10,257	1,69,613
Uttar Pradesh	18	Agra	(SC)	Ram Shankar Katheria	Bharatiya Janata Party	2,03,697	Kunwar Chand	Bahujan Samaj Party	1,93,982	9,715
Uttar Pradesh	19	Fatehpur Sikri	GEN	Seema Upadhyay	Bahujan Samaj Party	2,09,466	Raj Babbar	Indian National Congress	1,99,530	9,936
Uttar Pradesh	20	Firozabad	GEN	Akhilesh Yadav	Samajwadi Party	2,87,011	S. P. Singh Baghel	Bahujan Samaj Party	2,19,710	67,301
Uttar Pradesh	21	Mainpuri	GEN	Mulayam Singh Yadav	Samajwadi Party	3,92,308	Vinay Shakya	Bahujan Samaj Party	2,19,239	1,73,069
Uttar Pradesh	22	Etah	GEN	Kalyan Singh	Independent	2,75,717	Devendra Singh Yadav	Bahujan Samaj Party	1,47,449	1,28,268
Uttar Pradesh	23	Badaun	GEN	Dharmendra Yadav	Samajwadi Party	2,33,744	Dharam Yadav	Bahujan Samaj Party	2,01,202	32,542
Uttar Pradesh	24	Aonla	GEN	Maneka Gandhi	Bharatiya Janata Party	2,16,503	Dharmendra Kashyap	Samajwadi Party	2,08,822	7,681
Uttar Pradesh	25	Bareilly	GEN	Praveen Singh Aron	Indian National Congress	2,20,976	Santosh Kumar Gangwar	Bharatiya Janata Party	2,11,638	9,338
Uttar Pradesh	26	Pilibhit	GEN	Varun Gandhi	Bharatiya Janata Party	4,19,539	V M Singh	Indian National Congress	1,38,038	2,81,501
Uttar Pradesh	27	Shahjahanpur	(SC)	Mithlesh Kumar	Samajwadi Party	2,57,033	Sunita Singh	Bahujan Samaj Party	1,86,454	70,579
Uttar Pradesh	28	Kheri	GEN	Zafar Ali Naqvi	Indian National Congress	1,84,982	Iliyas Azmi	Bahujan Samaj Party	1,76,205	8,777
Uttar Pradesh	29	Dhaurahra	GEN	Jitin Prasada	Indian National Congress	3,91,391	Rajesh Verma	Bahujan Samaj Party	2,06,882	1,84,509
Uttar Pradesh	30	Sitapur	GEN	Kaisar Jahan	Bahujan Samaj Party	2,41,106	Mahendra Singh Verma	Samajwadi Party	2,21,474	19,632
Uttar Pradesh	31	Hardoi	(SC)	Usha Verma	Samajwadi Party	2,94,030	Ram Kumar Kuril	Bahujan Samaj Party	2,01,095	92,935
Uttar Pradesh	32	Misrikh	(SC)	Ashok Kumar Rawat	Bahujan Samaj Party	2,07,627	Shyam Prakash	Samajwadi Party	1,84,335	23,292
Uttar Pradesh	33	Unnao	GEN	Annu Tandon	Indian National Congress	4,75,476	Arun Shankar Shukla	Bahujan Samaj Party	1,73,384	3,02,092
Uttar Pradesh	34	Mohanlalganj	(SC)	Sushila Saroj	Samajwadi Party	2,56,367	Jai Prakash Rawat	Bahujan Samaj Party	1,79,772	76,595
Uttar Pradesh	35	Lucknow	GEN	Lalji Tandon	Bharatiya Janata Party	2,04,028	Rita Bahuguna Joshi	Indian National Congress	1,63,127	40,901
Uttar Pradesh	36	Rae Bareli	GEN	Sonia Gandhi	Indian National Congress	4,81,490	R. S. Kushwaha	Bahujan Samaj Party	1,09,325	3,72,165
Uttar Pradesh	37	Amethi	GEN	Rahul Gandhi	Indian National Congress	4,64,195	Asheesh Shukla	Bahujan Samaj Party	93,997	3,70,198
Uttar Pradesh	38	Sultanpur	GEN	Sanjaya Sinh	Indian National Congress	3,00,411	Mohammad Tahir	Bahujan Samaj Party	2,01,632	98,779
Uttar Pradesh	39	Pratapgarh	GEN	Ratna Singh	Indian National Congress	1,69,137	Shivakant Ojha	Bahujan Samaj Party	1,39,358	29,779
Uttar Pradesh	40	Farrukhabad	GEN	Salman Khurshid	Indian National Congress	1,69,351	Naresh Chandra Agrawal	Bahujan Samaj Party	1,42,152	27,199
Uttar Pradesh	41	Etawah	(SC)	Premdas Katheria	Samajwadi Party	2,78,776	Gaurishanker	Bahujan Samaj Party	2,32,030	46,746
Uttar Pradesh	42	Kannauj	GEN	Akhilesh Yadav	Samajwadi Party	3,37,751	Mahesh Chandra Verma	Bahujan Samaj Party	2,21,887	1,15,864
Uttar Pradesh	43	Kanpur Urban	GEN	Sriprakash Jaiswal	Indian National Congress	2,14,988	Satish Mahana	Bharatiya Janata Party	1,96,082	18,906
Uttar Pradesh	44	Akbarpur	GEN	Raja Ram Pal	Indian National Congress	1,92,549	Anil Shukla Warsi	Bahujan Samaj Party	1,60,506	32,043
Uttar Pradesh	45	Jalaun	(SC)	Ghanshyam Anuragi	Samajwadi Party	2,83,023	Tilak Chandra Ahirwar	Bahujan Samaj Party	2,71,614	11,409
Uttar Pradesh	46	Jhansi	GEN	Pradeep Jain Aditya	Indian National Congress	2,52,712	Ramesh Kumar Sharma	Bahujan Samaj Party	2,05,042	47,670
Uttar Pradesh	47	Hamirpur	GEN	Vijay Bahadur Singh	Bahujan Samaj Party	1,99,143	Siddha Gopal Sahu	Indian National Congress	1,73,641	25,502
Uttar Pradesh	48	Banda	GEN	R. K. Singh Patel	Samajwadi Party	2,40,948	Bhairon Prasad Mishra	Bahujan Samaj Party	2,06,355	34,593
Uttar Pradesh	49	Fatehpur	GEN	Rakesh Sachan	Samajwadi Party	2,18,953	Mahendra Prasad Nishad	Bahujan Samaj Party	1,66,725	52,228
Uttar Pradesh	50	Kaushambi	(SC)	Shailendra Kumar	Samajwadi Party	2,46,501	Girish Chandra Pasi	Bahujan Samaj Party	1,90,712	55,789
Uttar Pradesh	51	Phulpur	GEN	Kapil Muni Karwariya	Bahujan Samaj Party	1,67,542	Shyama Charan Gupta	Samajwadi Party	1,52,964	14,578
Uttar Pradesh	52	Allahabad	GEN	Rewati Raman Singh	Samajwadi Party	2,09,431	Ashok Kumar Bajpai	Bahujan Samaj Party	1,74,511	34,920
Uttar Pradesh	53	Barabanki	(SC)	P. L. Punia	Indian National Congress	3,28,418	Ram Sagar Rawat	Samajwadi Party	1,60,505	1,67,913
Uttar Pradesh	54	Faizabad	GEN	Nirmal Khatri	Indian National Congress	2,11,543	Mitrasen Yadav	Samajwadi Party	1,57,315	54,228
Uttar Pradesh	55	Ambedkar Nagar	GEN	Rakesh Pandey	Bahujan Samaj Party	2,59,487	Shankhlal Majhi	Samajwadi Party	2,36,751	22,736
Uttar Pradesh	56	Bahraich	(SC)	Kamal Kishor	Indian National Congress	1,60,005	Lal Mani Prasad	Bahujan Samaj Party	1,21,052	38,953
Uttar Pradesh	57	Kaiserganj	GEN	Brij Bhushan Sharan Singh	Samajwadi Party	1,96,063	Surendra Nath Awasthi	Bahujan Samaj Party	1,23,864	72,199
Uttar Pradesh	58	Shrawasti	GEN	Vinay Kumar Pandey	Indian National Congress	2,01,556	Rizwan Zaheer	Bahujan Samaj Party	1,59,527	42,029
Uttar Pradesh	59	Gonda	GEN	Beni Prasad Verma	Indian National Congress	1,55,675	Kirti Vardhan Singh	Bahujan Samaj Party	1,32,000	23,675
Uttar Pradesh	60	Domariyaganj	GEN	Jagdambika Pal	Indian National Congress	2,29,872	Jai Pratap Singh	Bharatiya Janata Party	1,53,306	76,566
Uttar Pradesh	61	Basti	GEN	Arvind Kumar Chaudhary	Bahujan Samaj Party	2,68,666	Raj Kishor Singh	Samajwadi Party	1,63,456	1,05,210
Uttar Pradesh	62	Sant Kabir Nagar	GEN	Bhishma Shankar Tiwari	Bahujan Samaj Party	2,11,043	Sharad Tripathi	Bharatiya Janata Party	1,81,547	29,496
Uttar Pradesh	63	Maharajganj	GEN	Harsh Vardhan	Indian National Congress	3,05,474	Ganesh Shanker Pandey	Bahujan Samaj Party	1,81,846	1,23,628
Uttar Pradesh	64	Gorakhpur	GEN	Yogi Adityanath	Bharatiya Janata Party	4,03,156	Vinay Shankar Tiwari	Bahujan Samaj Party	1,82,885	2,20,271
Uttar Pradesh	65	Kushi Nagar	GEN	R. P. N. Singh	Indian National Congress	2,23,954	Swami Prasad Maurya	Bahujan Samaj Party	2,02,860	21,094
Uttar Pradesh	66	Deoria	GEN	Gorakh Prasad Jaiswal	Bahujan Samaj Party	2,19,889	Prakash Mani Tripathi	Bharatiya Janata Party	1,78,110	41,779
Uttar Pradesh	67	Bansgaon	(SC)	Kamlesh Paswan	Bharatiya Janata Party	2,23,011	Shree Nath Ji	Bahujan Samaj Party	1,70,224	52,787
Uttar Pradesh	68	Lalganj	(SC)	Bali Ram	Bahujan Samaj Party	2,07,998	Neelam Sonkar	Bharatiya Janata Party	1,68,050	39,948
Uttar Pradesh	69	Azamgarh	GEN	Ramakant Yadav	Bharatiya Janata Party	2,47,648	Akbar Ahmad Dumpy	Bahujan Samaj Party	1,98,609	49,039
Uttar Pradesh	70	Ghosi	GEN	Dara Singh Chauhan	Bahujan Samaj Party	2,20,695	Arshad Jamal Ansari	Samajwadi Party	1,59,750	60,945
Uttar Pradesh	71	Salempur	GEN	Ramashankar Rajbhar	Bahujan Samaj Party	1,75,088	Bhola Pandey	Indian National Congress	1,56,783	18,305
Uttar Pradesh	72	Ballia	GEN	Neeraj Shekhar	Samajwadi Party	2,76,649	Sangram Singh Yadav	Bahujan Samaj Party	2,04,094	72,555
Uttar Pradesh	73	Jaunpur	GEN	Dhananjay Singh	Bahujan Samaj Party	3,02,618	Parasnath Yadav	Samajwadi Party	2,22,267	80,351
Uttar Pradesh	74	Machhlishahr	(SC)	Tufani Saroj	Samajwadi Party	2,23,152	Kamla Kant Gautam	Bahujan Samaj Party	1,98,846	24,306
Uttar Pradesh	75	Ghazipur	GEN	Radhe Mohan Singh	Samajwadi Party	3,79,233	Afzal Ansari	Bahujan Samaj Party	3,09,924	69,309
Uttar Pradesh	76	Chandauli	GEN	Ramkishun	Samajwadi Party	1,80,114	Kailash Nath Singh Yadav	Bahujan Samaj Party	1,79,655	459
Uttar Pradesh	77	Varanasi	GEN	Murli Manohar Joshi	Bharatiya Janata Party	2,03,122	Mukhtar Ansari	Bahujan Samaj Party	1,85,911	17,211
Uttar Pradesh	78	Bhadohi	GEN	Gorakh Nath Pandey	Bahujan Samaj Party	1,95,808	Chhotelal Bind	Samajwadi Party	1,82,845	12,963
Uttar Pradesh	79	Mirzapur	GEN	Bal Kumar Patel	Samajwadi Party	2,18,898	Anil Kumar Maurya	Bahujan Samaj Party	1,99,216	19,682
Uttar Pradesh	80	Robertsganj	(SC)	Pakaudi Lal Kol	Samajwadi Party	2,16,478	Ram Chandra Tyagi	Bahujan Samaj Party	1,66,219	50,259
Uttarakhand	1	Tehri Garhwal	GEN	Vijay Bahuguna	Indian National Congress	2,63,083	Jaspal Rana	Bharatiya Janata Party	2,10,144	52,939
Uttarakhand	2	Garhwal	GEN	Satpal Maharaj	Indian National Congress	2,36,949	Tejpal Singh Rawat	Bharatiya Janata Party	2,19,552	17,397
Uttarakhand	3	Almora	(SC)	Pradeep Tamta	Indian National Congress	2,00,824	Ajay Tamta	Bharatiya Janata Party	1,93,874	6,950
Uttarakhand	4	Nainital–Udhamsingh Nagar	GEN	K. C. Singh Baba	Indian National Congress	3,21,377	Bachi Singh Rawat	Bharatiya Janata Party	2,32,965	88,412
Uttarakhand	5	Haridwar	GEN	Harish Rawat	Indian National Congress	3,32,235	Swami Yatindranand Giri	Bharatiya Janata Party	1,27,412	2,04,823
West Bengal	1	Cooch Behar	(SC)	Nripendra Nath Roy	All India Forward Bloc	5,00,677	Arghya Roy Pradhan	All India Trinamool Congress	4,66,928	33,749
West Bengal	2	Alipurduars	(SC)	Manohar Tirkey	Revolutionary Socialist Party	3,84,890	Paban Kumar Lakra	All India Trinamool Congress	2,72,068	1,12,822
West Bengal	3	Jalpaiguri	(SC)	Mahendra Kumar Roy	Communist Party of India (Marxist)	4,69,613	Sukhbilas Barma	Indian National Congress	3,81,242	88,371
West Bengal	4	Darjeeling	GEN	Jaswant Singh	Bharatiya Janata Party	4,97,649	Jibesh Sarkar	Communist Party of India (Marxist)	2,44,360	2,53,289
West Bengal	5	Raiganj	GEN	Deepa Dasmunsi	Indian National Congress	4,51,776	Bireswar Lahiri	Communist Party of India (Marxist)	3,46,573	1,05,203
West Bengal	6	Balurghat	GEN	Prasanta Kumar Majumdar	Revolutionary Socialist Party	3,88,444	Biplab Mitra	All India Trinamool Congress	3,83,339	5,105
West Bengal	7	Maldaha Uttar	GEN	Mausam Noor	Indian National Congress	4,40,264	Sailen Sarkar	Communist Party of India (Marxist)	3,80,123	60,141
West Bengal	8	Maldaha Dakshin	GEN	Abu Hasem Khan Choudhury	Indian National Congress	4,43,377	Abdur Razzaque	Communist Party of India (Marxist)	3,07,097	1,36,280
West Bengal	9	Jangipur	GEN	Pranab Mukherjee	Indian National Congress	5,06,749	Mriganka Sekhar Bhattacharya	Communist Party of India (Marxist)	3,78,600	1,28,149
West Bengal	10	Baharampur	GEN	Adhir Ranjan Chowdhury	Indian National Congress	5,41,920	Promothes Mukherjee	Revolutionary Socialist Party	3,54,943	1,86,977
West Bengal	11	Murshidabad	GEN	Abdul Mannan Hossain	Indian National Congress	4,96,348	Anisur Rahman Sarkar	Communist Party of India (Marxist)	4,60,701	35,647
West Bengal	12	Krishnanagar	GEN	Tapas Paul	All India Trinamool Congress	4,43,679	Jyotirmoyee Sikdar	Communist Party of India (Marxist)	3,66,293	77,386
West Bengal	13	Ranaghat	(SC)	Sucharu Ranjan Haldar	All India Trinamool Congress	5,75,058	Basudeb Barman	Communist Party of India (Marxist)	4,73,235	1,01,823
West Bengal	14	Bangaon	(SC)	Gobinda Chandra Naskar	All India Trinamool Congress	5,46,596	Asim Bala	Communist Party of India (Marxist)	4,53,770	92,826
West Bengal	15	Barrackpur	GEN	Dinesh Trivedi	All India Trinamool Congress	4,28,699	Tarit Baran Topdar	Communist Party of India (Marxist)	3,72,675	56,024
West Bengal	16	Dum Dum	GEN	Saugata Roy	All India Trinamool Congress	4,58,988	Amitava Nandy	Communist Party of India (Marxist)	4,38,510	20,478
West Bengal	17	Barasat	GEN	Kakoli Ghosh Dastidar	All India Trinamool Congress	5,22,530	Sudin Chattopadhyay	All India Forward Bloc	3,99,629	1,22,901
West Bengal	18	Basirhat	GEN	Haji Nurul Islam	All India Trinamool Congress	4,79,650	Ajay Chakraborty	Communist Party of India	4,19,267	60,383
West Bengal	19	Jaynagar	(SC)	Tarun Mandal	Socialist Unity Centre of India (C)	4,46,200	Nimai Barman	Revolutionary Socialist Party	3,92,495	53,705
West Bengal	20	Mathurapur	(SC)	Choudhury Mohan Jatua	All India Trinamool Congress	5,65,505	Animesh Naskar	Communist Party of India (Marxist)	4,35,542	1,29,963
West Bengal	21	Diamond Harbour	GEN	Somen Mitra	All India Trinamool Congress	5,64,612	Samik Lahiri	Communist Party of India (Marxist)	4,12,923	1,51,689
West Bengal	22	Jadavpur	GEN	Kabir Suman	All India Trinamool Congress	5,40,667	Sujan Chakraborty	Communist Party of India (Marxist)	4,84,400	56,267
West Bengal	23	Kolkata Dakshin	GEN	Mamata Banerjee	All India Trinamool Congress	5,76,045	Rabin Deb	Communist Party of India (Marxist)	3,56,474	2,19,571
West Bengal	24	Kolkata Uttar	GEN	Sudip Bandyopadhyay	All India Trinamool Congress	4,60,646	Mohammed Salim	Communist Party of India (Marxist)	3,51,368	1,09,278
West Bengal	25	Howrah	GEN	Ambica Banerjee	All India Trinamool Congress	4,77,449	Swadesh Chakraborty	Communist Party of India (Marxist)	4,40,057	37,392
West Bengal	26	Uluberia	GEN	Sultan Ahmed	All India Trinamool Congress	5,14,193	Hannan Mollah	Communist Party of India (Marxist)	4,15,257	98,936
West Bengal	27	Srerampur	GEN	Kalyan Banerjee	All India Trinamool Congress	5,69,725	Santasri Chatterjee	Communist Party of India (Marxist)	4,32,535	1,37,190
West Bengal	28	Hooghly	GEN	Ratna De	All India Trinamool Congress	5,74,022	Rupchand Pal	Communist Party of India (Marxist)	4,92,499	81,523
West Bengal	29	Arambagh	(SC)	Sakti Mohan Malik	Communist Party of India (Marxist)	6,30,254	Sambhu Nath Malik	Indian National Congress	4,28,696	2,01,558
West Bengal	30	Tamluk	GEN	Suvendu Adhikari	All India Trinamool Congress	6,37,664	Lakshman Chandra Seth	Communist Party of India (Marxist)	4,64,706	1,72,958
West Bengal	31	Kanthi	GEN	Sisir Adhikari	All India Trinamool Congress	6,06,712	Prasanta Pradhan	Communist Party of India (Marxist)	4,77,609	1,29,103
West Bengal	32	Ghatal	GEN	Gurudas Dasgupta	Communist Party of India	6,25,923	Noor Alam Chowdhury	All India Trinamool Congress	4,78,739	1,47,184
West Bengal	33	Jhargram	(ST)	Pulin Bihari Baske	Communist Party of India (Marxist)	5,45,231	Amrit Hansda	Indian National Congress	2,52,886	2,92,345
West Bengal	34	Medinipur	GEN	Prabodh Panda	Communist Party of India	4,93,021	Dipak Kumar Ghosh	All India Trinamool Congress	4,45,004	48,017
West Bengal	35	Purulia	GEN	Narahari Mahato	All India Forward Bloc	3,99,201	Santiram Mahato	Indian National Congress	3,79,900	19,301
West Bengal	36	Bankura	GEN	Basudeb Acharia	Communist Party of India (Marxist)	4,69,223	Subrata Mukherjee	Indian National Congress	3,61,421	1,07,802
West Bengal	37	Bishnupur	(SC)	Susmita Bauri	Communist Party of India (Marxist)	5,41,075	Seuli Saha	All India Trinamool Congress	4,11,709	1,29,366
West Bengal	38	Bardhaman Purba	(SC)	Anup Kumar Saha	Communist Party of India (Marxist)	5,31,987	Ashoke Biswas	All India Trinamool Congress	4,72,568	59,419
West Bengal	39	Bardhaman-Durgapur	GEN	Sheikh Saidul Haque	Communist Party of India (Marxist)	5,73,399	Nargis Begum	Indian National Congress	4,65,162	1,08,237
West Bengal	40	Asansol	GEN	Bansa Gopal Chowdhury	Communist Party of India (Marxist)	4,35,161	Moloy Ghatak	All India Trinamool Congress	3,62,205	72,956
West Bengal	41	Bolpur	(SC)	Ram Chandra Dome	Communist Party of India (Marxist)	5,38,383	Asit Kumar Mal	Indian National Congress	4,11,501	1,26,882
West Bengal	42	Birbhum	GEN	Satabdi Roy	All India Trinamool Congress	4,86,553	Braja Mukherjee	Communist Party of India (Marxist)	4,25,034	61,519

== See also ==
- Results of the 2004 Indian general election by parliamentary constituency
- Results of the 2009 Indian general election by party
- Results of the 2009 Indian general election by state
