= Dediapada Assembly constituency =

Legislative Assembly constituency in Gujarat State, India

Coordinates: 21.63°N 73.59°E

Dediapada
- Constituency No. 149 for the Gujarat Legislative Assembly

Constituency details
- Country: India
- Region: Western India
- State: Gujarat
- District: Narmada
- Lok Sabha constituency: Bharuch
- Established: 1972
- Total electors: 222,807
- Reservation: ST

Member of Legislative Assembly
- 15th Gujarat Legislative Assembly
- Incumbent Vacant

Dediapada is one of the 182 Legislative Assembly constituencies of Gujarat state in India. It is part of Narmada district and is reserved for candidates belonging to the Scheduled Tribes.

== List of segments ==
This assembly seat represents the following segments,

1. Dediapada Taluka
2. Sagbara Taluka

== Members of the Legislative Assembly ==
Year	Member	Picture	Party
1995	Motilal Puniyabhi Vasava		Bharatiya Janata Party
2002	Maheshbhai Chhotubhai Vasava		Janata Dal
2007	Amarsinh Vasava		Indian National Congress
2012	Motilal Puniyabhi Vasava		Bharatiya Janata Party
2017	Maheshbhai Chhotubhai Vasava		Bharatiya Tribal Party
2022	Chaitarbhai Damjibhai Vasava		Aam Aadmi Party

== Election results ==
=== 2022 ===
Gujarat Assembly election, 2022:Dediapada Assembly constituency
Party	Candidate	Votes	%	±%
AAP	Chaitarbhai Damjibhai Vasava	1,03,433	55.87	
BJP	Hiteshkumar Devjibhai Vasava	63,151	34.11	
INC	Jermaben Suklal Vasava	12,587	6.8	
NOTA	None of the above	2,974	1.61	
Majority		40,282	21.76	
Turnout		1,82,162	83.1	
gain from		Swing		

=== 2017 ===
Gujarat Assembly Election, 2017: Dediapada
Party	Candidate	Votes	%	±%
BTP	Maheshbhai Chhotubhai Vasava	83,026	50.22	New
BJP	Motilal Puniyabhi Vasava	61,275	37.06	▲0.01
NCP	Rajendrasinh Deshmukh	6,721	4.07	New
Majority		21,751	13.16	▲11.48
Turnout		1,65,333	85.42	▼3.77
BTP gain from BJP		Swing		

=== 2012 ===
Gujarat Assembly Election, 2012
Party	Candidate	Votes	%	±%
BJP	Motilal Puniyabhi Vasava	56,471	37.05	▲23.69
INC	Amarsinh Vasava	53,916	35.37	▼0.05
JD(U)	Maheshbhai Chhotubhai Vasava	20,109	13.19	▼6.41
IND	Sureshbhai Vasava	10,212	6.70	New
Majority		2,555	1.68	▼14.14
Turnout		1,52,442	89.19	−−−
BJP gain from INC		Swing		

=== 2007 ===
Gujarat Assembly Election, 2007
Party	Candidate	Votes	%	±%
INC	Amarsinh Vasava	50,105	35.42	▲18.08
JD(U)	Maheshbhai Chhotubhai Vasava	27,726	19.6	▼11.61
IND	Motilal Puniyabhi Vasava	27,050	19.12	New
BJP	Manjula Vasava	18,898	13.36	▼13.2
IND	Pratapbhai Vasava	9,691	6.85	New
Majority		22,379	15.82	▲11.17
Turnout		1,41,467	---	−−−
INC gain from JD(U)		Swing		

=== 2002 ===
Gujarat Assembly Election, 2002
Party	Candidate	Votes	%	±%
JD(U)	Maheshbhai Chhotubhai Vasava	38,665	31.21	New
BJP	Shankarbhai Vasava	32,902	26.56	−−−
INC	Amarsinh Vasava	21,481	17.34	−−−
Majority		5,763	4.65	−−−
Turnout		1,23,871	67.63	−−−
JD(U) gain from JD		Swing		

== See also ==
- List of constituencies of the Gujarat Legislative Assembly
- Narmada district
