= Mansukhbhai Vasava =

Indian politician

Mansukhbhai Dhanjibhai Vasava
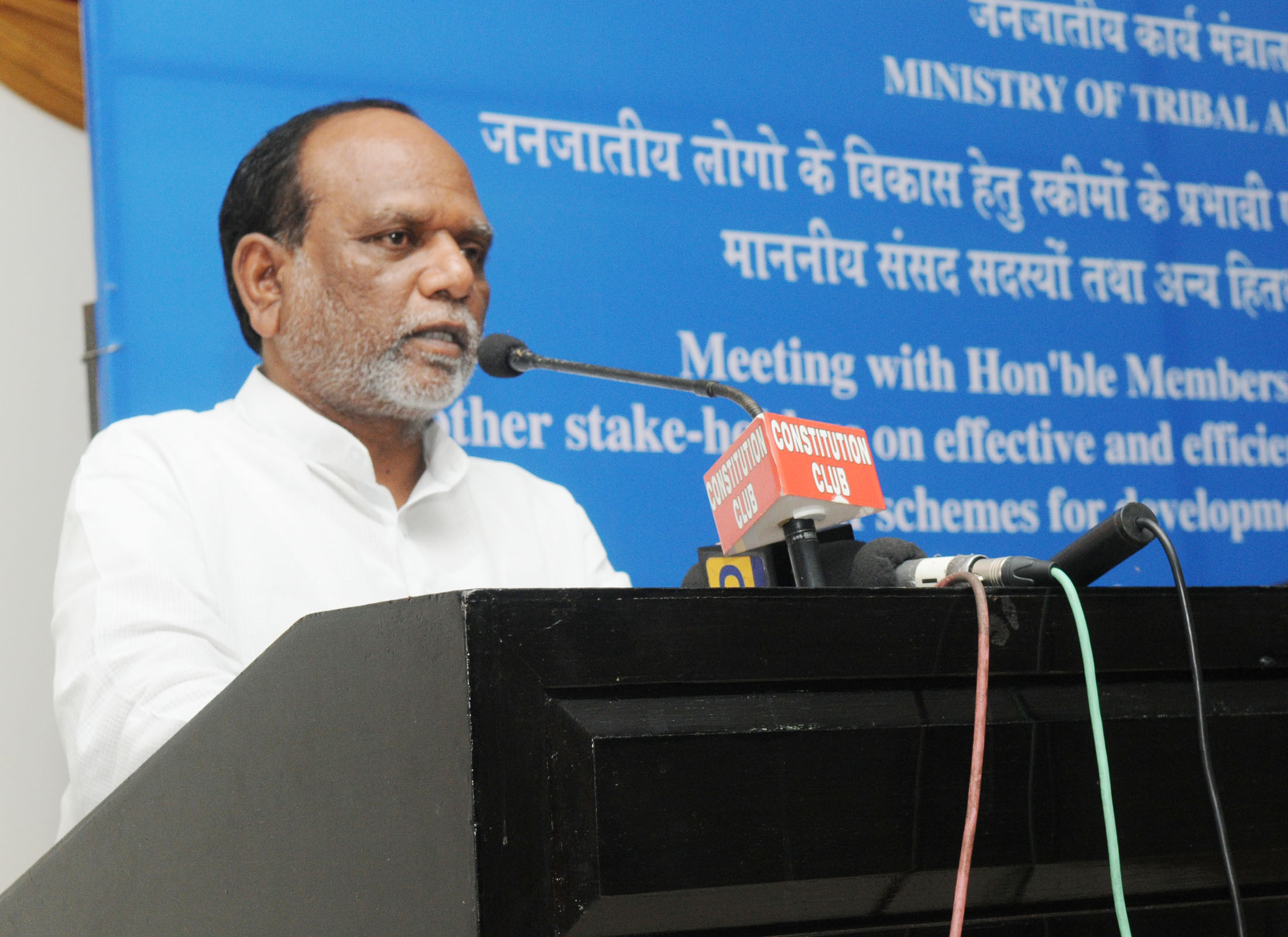

Member of Parliament, Lok Sabha
- Incumbent
- Assumed office 1998
- Preceded by: Chandubhai Deshmukh
- Constituency: Bharuch

Minister of State Ministry of Tribal Affairs
- In office 22 May 2014 – 5 July 2016
- Prime Minister: Narendra Modi

Personal details
- Born: 1 June 1957 (age 68) Narmada, Bombay State, India
- Party: Bharatiya Janata Party
- Spouse: Saraswatiben Vasava
- Children: 1 son and 2 daughters
- Education: B.A, M.S.W.
- Profession: Agriculturist
- Source

Mansukhbhai Dhanjibhai Vasava (born 1 June 1957) is an Indian politician associated with Bharatiya Janata Party and former Union Minister of State for Tribal Affairs (till July 5, 2016) in the Government of India under the Prime Ministership of Narendra Modi. He is a senior leader of the bharatiya janata party. He first got elected to 12th Lok Sabha in a by-election held on 25 November 1998 from the Bharuch Parliamentary Constituency of Gujarat, once a stronghold of Congress President Sonia Gandhi's political advisor Ahmed Patel. He was re-elected to the Lok Sabha in 1998, 1999, 2004, 2009 and 2014 from the same constituency (renamed as Bharuch in 2008); five times in a row. He also served in the Government of Gujarat in 1994 as a Deputy Minister. He holds a master's degree in Social Work (M.S.W.) from Gujarat Vidyapith, Ahemadabad and was graduated (B.A.) from South Gujarat University.

== Political career ==
He served as Minister of State from May 2014 to 5 July 2016.

Year	Position
1994-96	Member, Gujarat Legislative Assembly
1994-96	Deputy Minister, Government of Gujarat
1998	Elected to 12th Lok Sabha
1998-99	Member, Committee on Members of Parliament Local Area Development Scheme
1998-99	Member, Consultative Committee, Ministry of Social Justice and Empowerment
1999	Re-elected to 13th Lok Sabha (2nd term)
1999-2000	Member, Committee on Labour and Welfare
1999-2000	Member, Committee on Private Members' Bills and Resolutions
1999-2000	Member, Consultative Committee, Ministry of Rural Development
2004	Re-elected to 14th Lok Sabha (3rd term)
2004-2007	Member, Committee on Chemicals and Fertilizers
2004-2007	Member, Committee on Petitions
5 Aug. 2007	Member, Committee on Chemicals and Fertilizers
2009	Re-elected to 15th Lok Sabha (4th term)
31 Aug. 2009	Member, Committee on Science and Technology, Environment and Forests
