= Kerwada =

Kerwada Kervada
- village
- Location in Gujarat, India Kerwada (India)
- Coordinates: 21°54′0″N 72°51′0″E
- Country: India
- State: Gujarat
- District: Bharuch

Population
  - Total: 10,000

Languages
  - Official: Gujarati, Hindi
- Time zone: UTC+5:30 (IST)
- PIN: 392025
- Telephone code: 02641
- Vehicle registration: GJ16
- Nearest city: Bharuch
- Literacy: 55%
- Lok Sabha constituency: Bharuch
- Vidhan Sabha constituency: Jambusar
- Website: gujaratindia.com

Kerwada is a small village in Gujarat, India. The village's population is mainly Muslim and Hindu and Jain. The second speaker of Gujarat Legislative Assembly, Mansinhji Rana was from the Garasiya family of the village.

Dajipir Dargah Urs (fun fair) celebrate every year on 'Vaisakh Sud Poonam'.

Mansinhji Bhasaheb from Kerwada represented Bharuch in the 5th Lok Sabha.
