= Ahmed Patel =

Indian politician (1949–2020)

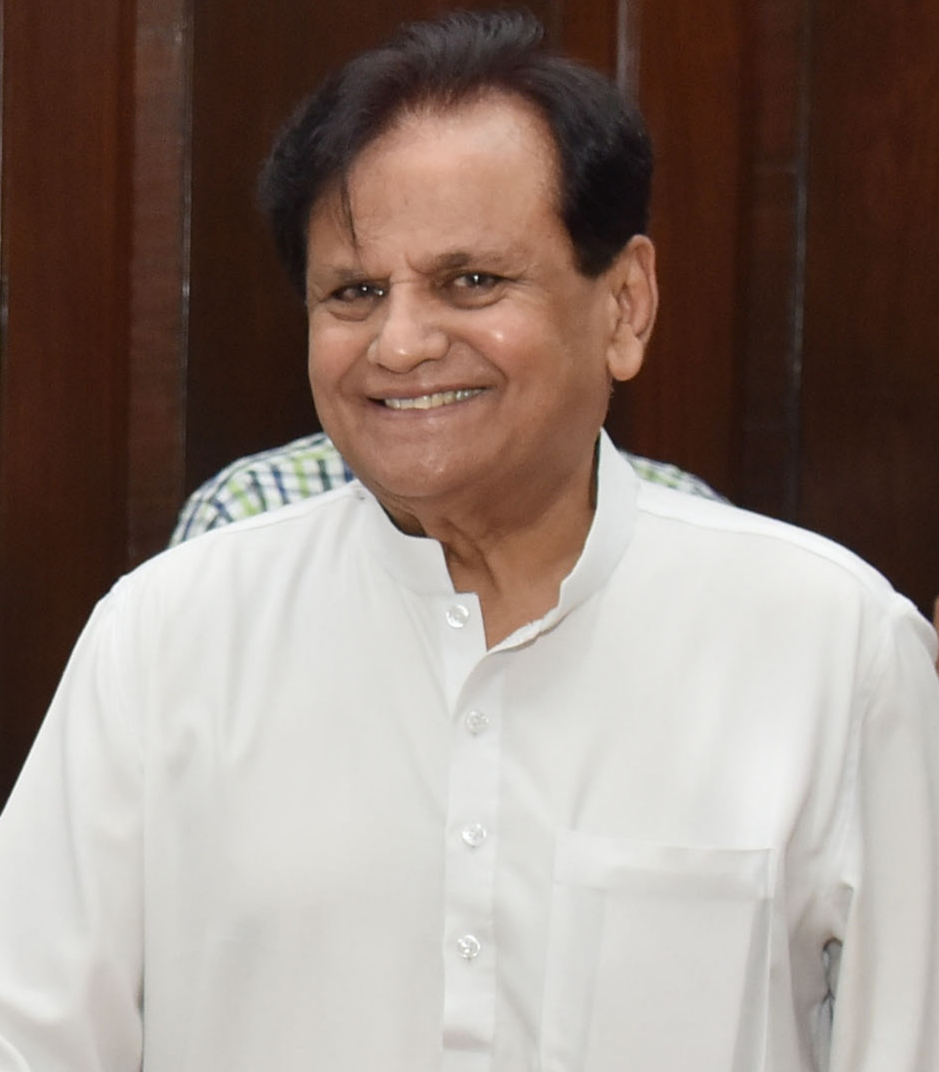

Treasurer of All India Congress Committee
- In office 2018 – 25 November 2020
- Preceded by: Motilal Vora
- Succeeded by: Pawan Kumar Bansal (Interim)

Member of Parliament, Rajya Sabha
- In office 19 August 1993 – 25 November 2020
- Succeeded by: Dineshchandra Anavadiya
- Constituency: Gujarat

Member of Parliament, Lok Sabha
- In office 1977–1989
- Preceded by: Mansinhji Rana
- Succeeded by: Chandubhai Deshmukh
- Constituency: Bharuch

Personal details
- Born: 21 August 1949 Bharuch, Bombay State, India (now in Gujarat, India)
- Died: 25 November 2020 (aged 71) Gurugram, Haryana, India
- Cause of death: COVID-19
- Party: Indian National Congress
- Spouse: Memoona Patel (m. 1976)
- Children: 2 Faisal Patel, Mumtaaz Patel
- Education: South Gujarat University

Ahmedbhai Muhamedbhai Patel (21 August 1949 – 25 November 2020), also known as Ahmed Patel, was an Indian politician and Member of Parliament from the Indian National Congress. He was the political secretary to Congress President Sonia Gandhi.

Patel has represented Gujarat for eight terms in the Parliament of India; three times in the lower house or Lok Sabha (1977–1989) and five times in the upper House or Rajya Sabha (1993–2020). He was also the treasurer of the All India Congress Committee (2018–2020).

== Early life ==
Patel was born on 21 August 1949, in the small village piraman, Ta-Ankleshwar, dist-Bharuch-based agriculturalist family, as the third child of Mohammed Ishaakji Patel and Hawaben Mohammedbhai in the western Indian state of Gujarat. His father was a social worker. He went on to join the Youth Congress, the youth wing of the Indian National Congress.

== Political career ==
Patel started his political career by contesting local body elections in the Bharuch District of Gujarat in 1976.

He was selected by the then Indian Prime Minister, Indira Gandhi, in 1977 to contest elections for the Sixth Lok Sabha from Bharuch. He went on to win the elections, and also won subsequent Lok Sabha elections in 1980 and 1984, continuing to represent Bharuch in the Parliament through 1989. In 1985, he went on to become the Parliamentary Secretary to then Prime Minister Rajiv Gandhi. In 1987, in his capacity as Member of Parliament, he had helped set up the Narmada Management Authority to monitor the Sardar Sarovar Project. He was appointed the secretary of the Jawahar Bhavan Trust in 1988 and is credited with having completed the construction of the Jawahar Bhavan in time for Nehru's birth centenary celebrations.

In 2005, Ahmed Patel was inducted into the Rajya Sabha for his fourth term. Though considered Sonia Gandhi's chief strategist, he chose to keep out of the UPA government in the 14th and 15th Lok Sabha between 2004 and 2014. Patel is only the second Muslim after Ehsan Jafri to be elected as a Lok Sabha MP in Gujarat.

He served as political secretary to Sonia Gandhi, the president of the Indian National Congress. He had served as the parliamentary secretary to the late prime minister Rajiv Gandhi in 1985. He had also been appointed as the treasurer of the All India Congress Committee in 2018, replacing senior party member Motilal Vora.

His last election to the Rajya Sabha in 2017, was heavily contested with the Gujarat state legislators being taken away to the southern state of Karnataka in order to prevent dissent, and select defectors being disqualified for revealing their ballots before casting them. This ended up being the first Rajya Sabha election from Gujarat to be contested in decades, while prior candidates had been elected unopposed.

=== Political legacy ===
During the UPA Government regime between 2004 and 2014, Patel was one of the chief troubleshooters, coordinators and translators between the government and party.

In 2005, he had got Bharuch included as one of the first five districts to be covered under the then launched Rajiv Gandhi Grameen Vidyutikaran Yojana, to boost electrification in the district. The Sardar Patel bridge to de-congest traffic between the twin cities of Bharuch and Ankleshwar has also been one of his contributions to the region. The establishment of Sardar Patel Hospital & Heart Institute in Ankleshwar is also credited to his efforts

He was considered a part of the power center in the Congress party due to his proximity to the president, Sonia Gandhi.

=== Lalit Modi allegations ===
Lalit Modi, an Indian businessman, who was the founder and first chairman of the Indian Premier League (IPL), and was banned by the Board of Control for Cricket in India (BCCI) for life on September 25, 2013, made a spate of podcast and media interviews in June 2026. In these interviews, including a detailed interview with ANI Editor-in-Chief Smita Prakash, Modi made several sensational claims against many Congress leaders, including ex Congress President Sonia Gandhi. Modi claimed that his strict crackdown on illegal betting and match-fixing had angered the mafia and the underworld. He claimed that Gandhi had backed the then Minister Shashi Tharoor, who was at the back of Kochi Tuskers, whose matters finally led to Modi's exit from IPL. Modi claimed Tharoor initially "sucked up" to him, visiting his house and making sweet talks to accommodate the franchise arrangements to Sunanda Pushkar in Kochi Tuskers. When Modi allegedly declined to do so, Tharoor allegedly directly threatened Modi with government raids if he questioned the equity structure of the Kochi Tuskers. He even named Sonia Gandhi, claiming that "all guns were trained on me", naming Patel, Pranab Mukherjee, and Rajiv Shukla, as pressurizing him to clear the Kochi franchise deal on behalf of Gandhi. He alleged that the then BCCI President Shashank Manohar had also asked him to do so, specifically mentioned 10-Janpath pressure. Modi claimed the Congress party is running a long-term vendetta against him, where Rahul Gandhi continues to target him during elections even today. He said he possesses huge amount of evidences of this targeted witch-hunt against him.

So far there has been no response from the Congress Party on this matter.

== Personal life ==
Patel was married to Memoona Ahmed Patel in 1976. The couple had a daughter and a son. He was known to keep a low profile and rarely interacted with the media.

== Death ==
He died on 25 November 2020, due to multiple organ failure stemming from COVID-19. He had been admitted to the Medanta Hospital and was in the ICU upon being diagnosed with COVID-19. His dead body was taken to his ancestral village in Gujarat, and was buried there.

Rajya Sabha
Preceded by NA	Member of Parliament for Gujarat; 1993	Succeeded by Incumbent
Lok Sabha
Preceded by Mansinhji Rana	Member of Parliament for Bharuch; 1977–1989	Succeeded by Chandubhai Deshmukh
