= Jhagadiya Assembly constituency =

Legislative Assembly constituency in Gujarat State, India

Coordinates: 21.72°N 73.15°E

Jhagadiya
- Constituency No. 152 for the Gujarat Legislative Assembly

Constituency details
- Country: India
- Region: Western India
- State: Gujarat
- District: Bharuch
- Lok Sabha constituency: Bharuch
- Established: 1962
- Total electors: 258,955
- Reservation: ST

Member of Legislative Assembly
- 15th Gujarat Legislative Assembly
- Incumbent Riteshkumar Vasava
- Party: Bharatiya Janata Party
- Elected year: 2022

Jhagadiya is one of the 182 Legislative Assembly constituencies of Gujarat state in India. It is part of Bharuch district and is reserved for candidates belonging to the Scheduled Tribes.

== List of segments ==
This assembly seat represents the following segments,

1. Jhagadia Taluka
2. Valia Taluka
3. Netrang taluka

== Members of Legislative Assembly ==
Year	Member	Picture	Party
1962	Dhanuben Dalpatbhai Vasava		Indian National Congress
1967	Zinabhai Ramsang Vasava		Indian National Congress
1972	Chimanlal K Vasava		Indian National Congress
1977	Zinabhai Ramsang Vasava		Indian National Congress
1980	Ravadas Limjibha Vasava		Indian National Congress
1985	Ravadas Limjibha Vasava		Indian National Congress
1990	Chhotubhai Vasava		Janata Dal
1995	Chhotubhai Vasava		Janata Dal
1998	Chhotubhai Vasava		Janata Dal
2002	Chhotubhai Vasava		Janata Dal
2007	Chhotubhai Vasava		Janata Dal
2012	Chhotubhai Vasava		Janata Dal
2017	Chhotubhai Vasava		Bharatiya Tribal Party
2022	Riteshkumar Vasava		Bharatiya Janata Party

== Election results ==
=== 2022 ===
Gujarat Assembly Election, 2022
Party	Candidate	Votes	%	±%
BJP	Ritesh Vasava	89,933	45.55	+11.24
Independent	Chhotubhai Vasava	66,433	33.64	
AAP	Urmila Bhagat	19,722	9.99	New
INC	Fatehsinghbhai Vasava	15,219	7.71	New
Majority		23,500	11.91	
Turnout		1,97,456		
BJP gain from BTP		Swing		

=== 2017 ===
Gujarat Assembly Election, 2017: Jhagadiya
Party	Candidate	Votes	%	±%
BTP	Chhotubhai Vasava	113,854	60.18	New
BJP	Ravjibhai Vasava	64,906	34.31	+12.87
JD(U)	Chhotubhai A. Vasava	5,055	2.67	−36.49
Majority			25.87	
Turnout		1,89,179	81.44	+0.05
BTP gain from JD(U)		Swing		

=== 2012 ===
Gujarat Assembly Election, 2012
Party	Candidate	Votes	%	±%
JD(U)	Chhotubhai Vasava	66,622	39.16	+0.1
INC	Balubhai Vasava	53,318	31.34	−0.62
BJP	Narendrabhai Vasava	36,473	21.44	−0.21
GPP	Rakeshkumar Vasava	8,056	4.74	New
BSP	Thakorbhai Vasava	5,641	3.32	New
Majority		13,304	7.82	
Turnout		170110	81.39	
JD(U) hold		Swing		

=== 2007 ===
Gujarat Assembly Election, 2007
Party	Candidate	Votes	%	±%
JD(U)	Chhotubhai Vasava	41,460	39.06	−3.75
INC	Chandubhai Vasava	33,927	31.96	+3.64
BJP	Rashmikaben Vasava	22,983	21.65	+0.37
Majority			7.1	−7.39
Turnout		1,06,156		
JD(U) hold		Swing		

=== 2002 ===
Gujarat Assembly Election, 2002
Party	Candidate	Votes	%	±%
JD(U)	Chhotubhai Vasava	45,157	42.81	
INC	Dalpatsinh Vasava	29,868	28.32	
BJP	Ramanbhai Vasava	22,442	21.28	
Majority			14.49	
Turnout		1,05,471	69.12	
JD(U) hold		Swing		

== See also ==
- List of constituencies of the Gujarat Legislative Assembly
- Bharuch district
- Gujarat Legislative Assembly
