= Dineshchandra Anavadiya =

Indian politician

Member of Parliament, Rajya Sabha
- In office 19 February 2021 – 11 August 2023
- Preceded by: Ahmed Patel
- Constituency: Gujarat

Personal details
- Born: Deesa, Banaskantha
- Party: Bharatiya Janata Party

Dineshchandra Anavadiya is an Indian politician who was a former Member of Parliament in the Rajya Sabha from Gujarat. He was elected in a bypoll on 19 February 2021 due to the death of Ahmed Patel. He retired in August 2023.

He was also worked as President of Bakshipanch Morcha Gujarat State. He was former Director and Chairman of Gujarat State Road Transport Corporation. He is also member of Institute of Teaching and Research in Ayurveda in Jamnagar.
