= Mansinhji Rana =

Indian politician

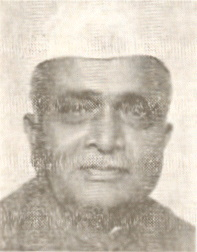

Member of the Lok Sabha
- In office 1967–1977
- Succeeded by: Ahmed Patel
- Constituency: Broach

Personal details
- Born: 10 March 1904 Kervada, Broach district, India
- Party: Indian National Congress
- Education: College of Estate Management

Mansinhji Bhasaheb Rana (born 10 March 1904) was an Indian politician, landlord, agriculturist, and advocate who served as a Member of Parliament in the Lok Sabha, representing the Broach (now Bharuch) constituency of Gujarat in 1967. He also served as a cabinet minister in at least two different ministries. He was affiliated with the Indian National Congress.

== Early life and education ==
Born in Kerwada, Broach District (now Bharuch), Gujarat, Mansinhji was the son of Sardar Bhasaheb Raisinhji. He pursued higher education at Bombay University Law College and the Agriculture College in Poona. He further studied at the Middle Temple, London, earning a Bar-at-Law degree, and attended the College of Estate Management, London.

== Career ==
Mansinhji had a diverse career as a landlord, agriculturist, and advocate. Before his parliamentary tenure, he held several significant positions, including President of the Taluka Panchayat Vagra (1935–38), Honorary Magistrate (First Class) in Broach and Vagra (1938–39), and Commandant of the Bombay Civil Pioneer Force (1942–45). He was also a trustee of the Vagra Education Trust and the Sir David Sassoon Trust, Bombay (1940–44).

His political career included serving as a Member of the Bombay Legislative Assembly (1946–52 and 1956–60) and the Gujarat Legislative Assembly (1962–67), where he was Speaker from 1960 to 1962.

In 1967, he was elected to the Lok Sabha from the Broach constituency, representing the Indian National Congress. He also attended the Commonwealth Parliamentary Conference in London in 1961, representing all state branches of India on its Executive Council.

He also served as a cabinet minister in at least two different ministries.

== Personal life ==
Mansinhji married Rani Saheb Rajrani on 12 May 1926. The couple had two sons and three daughters.
