= Chaitar Vasava =

Indian politician

Member of the Gujarat Legislative Assembly
- Incumbent
- Assumed office 8 December 2022
- Preceded by: Maheshbhai Chhotubhai Vasava
- Constituency: Dediapada

Personal details
- Born: Gujarat, India
- Party: Aam Aadmi Party
- Occupation: Politician

Chaitarbhai Damjibhai Vasava is an Indian politician. He served as a Member of The Gujarat Legislative Assembly from the Dediapada Assembly constituency representing the Aam Aadmi Party from 8 December 2022 to 23 June 2026. In January 2023, he was appointed the legislative party leader of AAP in the Gujarat assembly.

In 2023, he raised demand for separate state of Bhil Pradesh for the tribals.

He was recently in news when his video slapping a common citizen surfaced.

== Election history ==
Gujarat Assembly election, 2022:Dediapada Assembly constituency
Party	Candidate	Votes	%	±%
AAP	Chaitarbhai Damjibhai Vasava	103433	55.87	
BJP	Hiteshkumar Devjibhai Vasava	63151	34.11	
INC	Jermaben Suklal Vasava	12587	6.8	
NOTA	None of the above	2974	1.61	
Majority		40,282	21.76	{{{change}}}
Turnout				{{{change}}}
Registered electors		218,873		
