= Motilal Puniyabhi Vasava =

Indian politician

Motilal Puniyabhi Vasava is an Indian politician from Gujarat. He is a member of the BJP.

In 1995, he was elected from Narmada district's Dediapada assembly constituency of Gujarat.
