= Bharatiya Tribal Party =

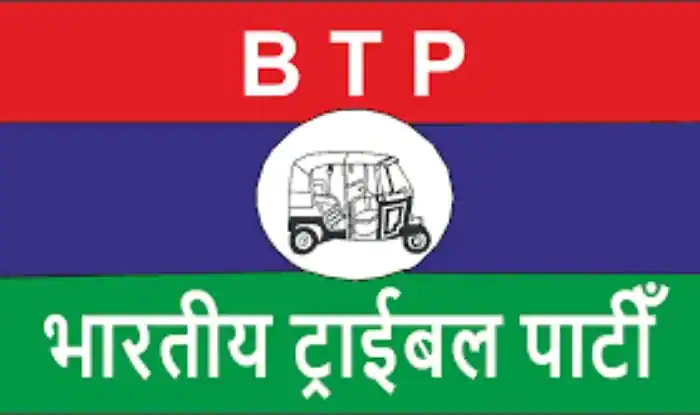
- Abbreviation: BTP
- Leader: Chhotubhai Vasava
- Founder: Maheshbhai Vasava
- Founded: 2018
- Split from: Loktantrik Janata Dal
- Headquarters: Gujarat
- Ideology: Tribal interest Bhilistan statehood
- Colours: Red
- Alliance: United Progressive Alliance (2018-2020); AIMIM+ (2020-2022)
- Seats in Rajasthan Legislative Assembly: 0 / 200

Election symbol

Website
- bharatiyatribalparty.org

Bharatiya Tribal Party (abbr. BTP) is a political party based in Gujarat, India. It was formed in 2017 by Chhotubhai Vasava and Maheshbhai Vasava. The Election Commission of India allotted the Auto rickshaw symbol to BTP.

== History ==
=== Gujarat ===
Chhotubhai Vasava, a Bhil tribal leader, was a member of the Janata Dal (United) (JD(U)) from 1990 to 2017. He left the party and founded the BTP ahead of the 2017 Gujarat Legislative Assembly election when JD(U) allied with the Bharatiya Janata Party. It won 2 seats; Chhotubhai Vasava from Jhagadiya Assembly constituency and his son Mahesh Vasava from Dediapada Assembly constituency; in the 2017 Gujarat election.

BTP formed the alliance with AIMIM in 2020 Gujarat panchayat election. They announced an alliance with the AIMIM for the 2022 Gujarat Legislative Assembly election, but it broke its alliance with AIMIM and allied with the Aam Aadmi Party in April 2022. It again broke its alliance with AAP in September 2022 and announced contesting the state legislative elections by itself but lost its two seats.

=== Rajasthan ===
The BTP fought and won two seats Chorasi and Sagwara in the 2018 Rajasthan Legislative Assembly election. It joined the Indian National Congress government, but withdrew its support in 2020. In September 2023, both of them left BTP and formed a new party Bharat Adivasi Party.

== See also ==
- Bahujan Samaj Party
- Samata Party
- 2017 Gujarat Legislative Assembly election
- 2018 Rajasthan Legislative Assembly election
- Elections in India
- List of political parties in India
