= Chandubhai Deshmukh =

Indian politician

Chandubhai Deshmukh (1940–1998) was a leader of Bharatiya Janata Party from Gujarat. He was elected to the Lok Sabha, lower house of the Parliament of India from the Baroach constituency four times. He was a member of Gujarat Legislative Assembly during 1977-79 period and served as a cabinet minister holding Forests, Tribal Welfare and Rural Housing portfolios in ministry headed by Babubhai Patel.
