= Chhotubhai Vasava =

Indian politician

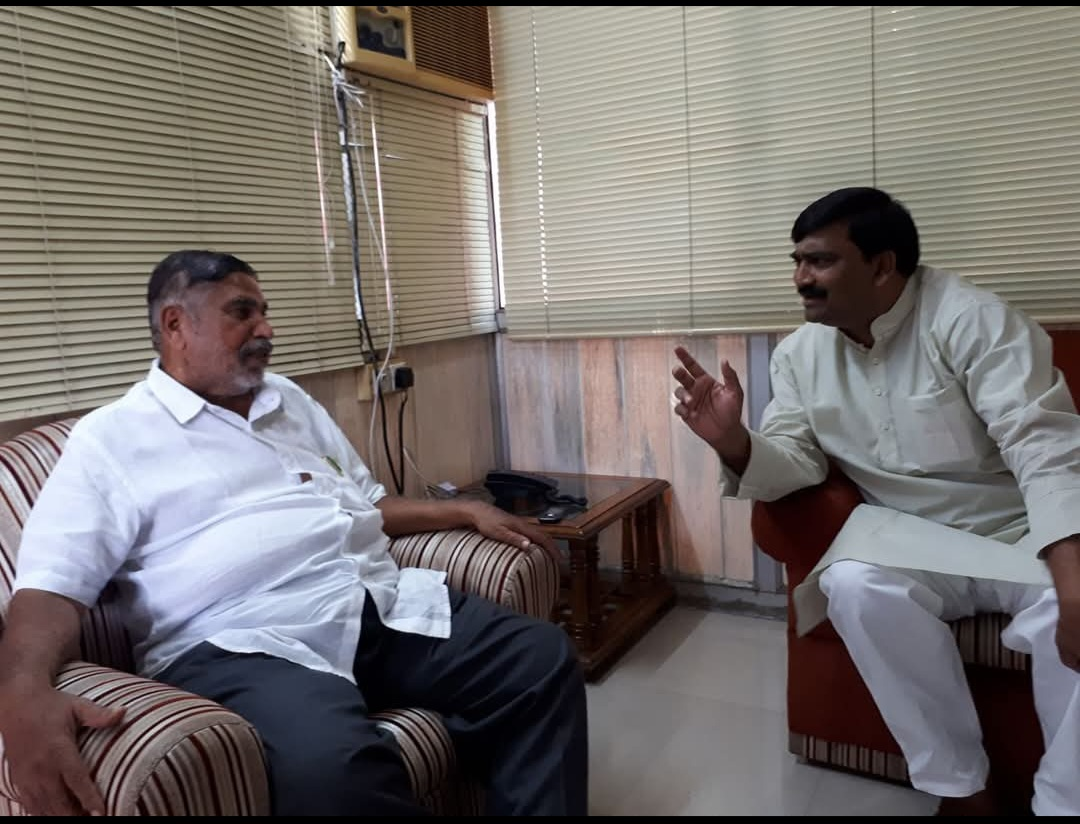
- Chhotubhai Vasava at JDU office Delhi

Member of Gujarat Legislative Assembly
- In office 1990–2022
- Constituency: Jhagadia

Personal details
- Born: 15 July 1945 (age 81) Bharuch, Bombay Presidency, British India
- Party: Bhartiya Tribal Party (2026-Present)
- Other political affiliations: Loktantrik Janata Dal (2018-2018) Janata Dal (United) (2007–2017); Bharatiya Tribal Party (2017–2026)
- Children: 3 sons including Maheshbhai Vasava kishorbhai Vasava

Chhotubhai Amarasinhbhai Vasava (born 15 July 1945) is an Indian politician from Western Indian state of Gujarat. He founded the Bharatiya Tribal Party (BTP) in 2017 after leaving Janata Dal (United). He is a seven term Member of the Legislative Assembly from the Jhagadia constituency since 1990.

== Early life ==
He was born in Bharuch district of Gujarat state of northern India. He belongs to an Adivasi ethnic Bhil tribal community.

== Career ==
He is an MLA from Jhagadiya Assembly constituency. He was a member of Janata Dal (United) (JD(U)) from 1990 to 2017. He left JD (U) when it formed an alliance with Bharatiya Janata Party in Bihar state in 2017.

He founded the Bharatiya Tribal Party (BTP), less than a month before the 2017 Gujarat Legislative Assembly election which won two seats in assembly in an alliance with the Indian National Congress.

He is a well-known tribal leader. He is one advocate of Bhilistan a separate state comprising tribal dominated parts of Gujarat, Rajasthan, Madhya Pradesh and Maharashtra.

== Electoral performance ==
Gujarat Assembly Election, 2017: Jhagadiya
Party	Candidate	Votes	%	±%
BTP	Chhotubhai Vasava	113,854	60.18	New
BJP	Ravjibhai Vasava	64,906	34.31	+12.87
JD(U)	Chhotubhai A. Vasava	5,055	2.67	−36.49
Majority			25.87	
Turnout		1,89,179	81.44	+0.05
BTP gain from JD(U)		Swing		
