= ITM =

ITM may stand for:

== Education ==
- ITM Law School, one of the professional graduate schools of ITM University
- ITM-IFM, Mumbai, India
- Institut Teknologi Mara, a public university in Shah Alam, Selangor, Malaysia
- Institute for Information, Telecommunication and Media Law, educational organization in Münster, Germany
- Institute of Tropical Medicine Antwerp, research and training in tropical medicine, Belgium
- Information technology management
- International Tourism Management

== Music ==
- In This Moment, a female-led metalcore band
- Irish traditional music
- In the Meantime (Alessia Cara album)

== Science and Engineering ==
- Irregular Terrain Model, an algorithm to estimate radio frequency propagation pathloss (a.k.a. the "Longley-Rice" algorithm).

== Other ==
- Independent Timber Merchants, a New Zealand building supplies and hardware retailer
- ITM Cup, a rugby union professional competition for New Zealand unions
- ITM Power, manufactures integrated hydrogen energy solutions
- ITM Stadium, in Whangarei, New Zealand
- Indiana Transportation Museum, a railroad museum
- Intermediate-term memory, a stage of memory
- International Trade Mart
- Irish Transverse Mercator, new geographic coordinate system of Ireland
- Israeli Transverse Mercator, new geographic coordinate system of Israel
- IATA Airport Code of Osaka International Airport, Japan

== See also ==
- ITM University (disambiguation)
- In the Morning (disambiguation)
