= Deepak Foundation =

Indian non-profit organization

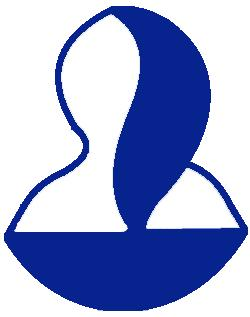
- Founded: 1982; Vadodara, Gujarat, India
- Founder: C.K. Mehta
- Type: non-governmental organization (NGO)
- Purpose: Rural and Tribal areas, Motherhood, Childcare
- Method: Development of Infrastructure, Education
- Owner: C.K. Metha
- Key people: C.K. Mehta (Founder and Chairman), Archana Joshi (Director)
- Employees: 400 professionals
- Website: deepakfoundation.org

Deepak Foundation is a non-profit organization based in Vadodara, Gujarat. It was founded by Shri C.K. Mehta of Deepak Group of Industries in 1982 with the aim of providing maternal and child care services to industrial workers living in the GIDC (Gujarat Industrial Development Corporation) area, and area with a rural population of nearly 50,000 around its plant in Nandesari, Vadodara in Gujarat. Deepak Foundation provides development aid in rural and tribal areas of the district of Vadodara. The foundation's mission is to create and enable a sustainable environment among rural and tribal communities by setting up a basis of livelihood and an intact healthcare system. Nearly 400 full-time professional staff are sanctioned at 22 different locations throughout Vadodara district. Women compromise 35% of the total staff, their work helps almost 2 Million beneficiaries.

== Vision ==
The Deepak Foundation's vision is a world that is free of distress, disease, deprivation and exploitation. Our focus is the woman and the child: they are the vehicles through which the future can be determined and changed.

— C.K. Mehta, The Healing Touch - annual report 2008 - 2009

To approach to that vision, Deepak Foundation set the following goals to itself:

1. Promote practices for safe motherhood and child survival.
2. Offer access to health and preschool education services.
3. Ensure sustainable livelihood for underprivileged communities.
4. Provide disaster relief and rehabilitation services.

== History ==
Caused by the people suffering from floods in the Amreli District of Gujarat State in the year 1981, Shri C.K. Mehta decided to become socially active. He is the founder and today the chairman of the Deepak Foundation. The first initiative was a small 15-bed maternal and child care hospital to provide curative and preventive services for the industrial workers living around in 30 villages surrounding the industrial belt of Nandesari, Vadodara. The population of this area was 40,000. An Emergency Transport Facility was established in 1982. This service assisted the government in delivering maternal and child care services in these 30 villages.

The foundation gradually made a foray into sectors like livelihood promoting by setting up the first women's dairy cooperative societies and women's self-help groups, disaster relief and rehabilitation, preschool education, HIV prevention, and adolescent health.

In the early nineties, the foundation started to promote the socio-economic development of the communities through Women's Savings, Credit groups, and the first Women's Dairy Cooperative in 1995. Due to the heavy influx of migrant workers in industrial belts, the foundation initiated HIV/AIDS prevention interventions in 1997. Since 2004–2005 the Deepak Foundation is in partnership with the Department of Health and Family Welfare, Government of Gujarat providing motherhood and child survival in the entire tribal area of Vadodara district. Today, the Organization has evolved into a full-fledged foundation covering all 1548 villages of Vadodara district in Gujarat. The interventions that initially catered to the needs of only the industrial workers for nearly twenty years today through its multifaceted programs reach out to nearly 2 million population spread over 1548 villages of Vadodara district to provide services in various development sectors through public–private partnership (PPP).

== Projects ==
The Deepak Foundation operates several projects. The main focus is on SMCS and KALP-Project.

=== Safe Motherhood & Child Survival (SMCS) ===
The SMCS project has been implemented since 2005 in cooperation with the government of Gujarat. The project aims to reduce infant and maternal mortality in the district through the existing government health delivery systems. The key components of the project are:

1. Formation and strengthening of Village Health and Sanitation Committees.
2. Behavior Change Communications through village volunteers i.e. Accredited Social Health Activists (ASHAs).
3. Setting up an emergency transport network and two Mobile Health Units in difficult tribal areas.
4. Establishment of a Comprehensive Emergency Obstetric and Newborn Care (CEmONC) unit linked to a Community Health Centre covering 9 lakhs tribal population.
5. Setting up Help Desk at the district level receiving referral cases from peripheral areas.
6. Providing a comprehensive package of services for anemia prevention and control.

=== Kawant Livelihood Project (KALP) ===
Started in 2009, the KALP-Project contains multiple steps to develop livelihood in Kawant. Kawant comprises more than 30,000 households. Holistic development through people's participation calls for the integration of services at a grassroots level. KALP is an initiative in this direction. The project has been implemented in partnership with the Tribal Development Department, Government of Gujarat. The foundation plans to undertake the following:

1. Promote livelihood opportunities in conventional and potential farm and non-farm sectors.
2. Generate additional employment through skills development, extension and credit support, and micro-entrepreneurship promotion.
3. Mitigate distress migration by the creation of a strong social safety net for vulnerable groups and create fallback employment sources.
4. Promote community participation in the process of development and establish Kawant Development Corporation under section 25 of the Companies Act.

=== Further More Projects ===
Other projects are for example Deepak Medical Foundation Hospital (DMF), Pre-School Education & Care, Integrated Child Development Services, Sexual Health and HIV/AIDS Awareness, or Disaster Relief and Rehabilitation.
