= ITM University =

ITM University may refer to:

- ITM University (Gwalior), Madhya Pradesh, India
- ITM University, Raipur, Naya Raipur, Chhattisgarh, India
- ITM Vocational University, Waghodia, Gujarat, India
- The NorthCap University, formerly known as ITM University, Gurugram, Haryana, India
