= GIPCL Vadodara Gas based Power Station =

Power plant in India

- Country: India
- Location: Vadodara, Gujarat
- Coordinates: 22°22′32.1″N 73°06′08.4″E
- Status: Operational
- Commission date: February, 1992
- Owner: Gujarat Industries Power Company Ltd.

Thermal power station
- Primary fuel: Fuel gas

Power generation
- Nameplate capacity: 310 MW

Gujarat Industries Power Company Ltd.
- Type: Public Limited company
- Traded as: BSE: 517300; NSE: GIPCL
- Industry: Electricity
- Headquarters: Vadodara, Gujarat, India
- Revenue: ▼₹1,378 crore (US$140 million) (2020)
- Net income: ▲₹247 crore (US$26 million) (2020)
- Total assets: ▲₹3,929 crore (US$410 million) (2020)
- Total equity: ▲₹1,247.82 crore (US$130 million)
- Owner: Government of Gujarat (GoG)
- Website: www.gipcl.com

GIPCL Vadodara Gas based Power Station is Gas turbine based combined cycle power plant. It is located at Dhanora village in Vadodara, Gujarat. The power plant is run by state-owned Gujarat Industrial Power Corporation Limited (GIPCL). The primary electricity generation is through the Gas turbines. Waste heat from the gas turbine is recovered by a heat recovery steam generator (HRSG) to power a conventional steam turbine. The HRSG recovers heat from a hot gas stream and produces steam, the steam utilized to power the steam turbines.

== About GIPCL ==
Gujarat Industrial Power Corporation Limited (GIPCL) is a Public Limited company incorporated in 1985. The company has been promoted by Gujarat's Public Sector Undertakings (PSUs), namely GSFC, GACL, Petrofils Co-operative Ltd., and GUVNL. In 1992, GIPCL commissioned its first power plant at Vadodara. It is a gas bases combined cycle power plant with 145 MW capacity. The concept of this power plant is a group captive power plant, which supplies power to promoter companies; the power distribution to the promoters is in proportion to their original equity holding.

== Capacity ==
The installed capacity of the power plant is 310 MW.

Phase	Unit Number	Installed Capacity (MW)	Type	Date of Commissioning	Status
1	1	32	GT	February, 1992	Running
1	2	32	GT	February, 1992	Running
1	3	32	GT	February, 1992	Running
1	4	49	STG	February, 1992	Running
2	5	111	GT	November, 1997	Running
2	6	54	STG	November, 1997	Running

== See also ==
- GIPCL Surat Thermal Power Station
- NTPC Kawas Gas based power plant
