= Deepak Nitrite =

Indian chemical manufacturer

Deepak Nitrite Ltd
- Type: Public
- Traded as: BSE: 506401; NSE: DEEPAKNTR
- ISIN: INE288B01029
- Industry: Chemicals
- Founded: 1970; 56 years ago
- Founder: Chimanlal Khimchand Mehta
- Headquarters: Vadodara, Gujarat, India
- Key people: Deepak Chimanlal Mehta (Chairman & Managing Director); Maulik Deepak Mehta (CEO)
- Products: Acetone; Agrochemicals; Detergents; Dyes; Pigments; Pharmaceutical intermediates; Phenol; Rubber; Fuel Additives
- Revenue: ▲₹8,019 crore (US$840 million) (FY23)
- Net income: ▲₹852 crore (US$89 million) (FY23)
- Total assets: ▲₹3,208 crore (US$340 million) (2020)
- Subsidiaries: Deepak Phenolics
- Website: www.godeepak.com

Deepak Nitrite Ltd. is an Indian chemical manufacturing company. The company’s manufacturing facilities are located at Nandesari and Dahej in Gujarat, Roha and Taloja in Maharashtra and Hyderabad in Telangana. Deepak Nitrite produces a spectrum of chemicals, including agrochemicals, colourants, rubber, pharmaceuticals, speciality and fine chemicals. Deepak Mehta is the chairman of the company and his son Maulik Mehta is the chief executive officer.

== History ==
The founder of the company Chimanlal Khimchand Mehta (father of Deepak Mehta) was the known chemical trader in Jain family of Gujarat. The company was incorporated in March 1970.

Sodium nitrite and nitrate plants were commissioned at Nadesari, Vadodara, Gujarat and production started in 1972. The plant produces chemicals like sodium nitrite, sodium nitrate and other allied chemicals, dyes, hexamethylene tetramine and dyes intermediates.

The company held its Initial public offering (IPO) in 1971. The IPO oversubscribed by 20 times.

In 1984 company acquire Sahyadri Dyestuffs & Chemicals unit from Mafatlal Industries.

Company established Hydrogenation Plant at Taloja, Maharashtra in 1995.

The company acquired management and control of Aryan Pesticides Limited, Roha and DASDA Division of Vasant Chemicals, Telangana in 2003 and 2007 respectively.

In 2015, The company promoted Deepak Phenolics Limited for the manufacturing of phenol & acetone at Dahej, Gujarat. Deepak Phenolics is a subsidiary of Deepak Nitrate. Deepak Phenolics manufactures pharmaceutical grade isopropyl alcohol (IPA) and acetone. The company is also planning on producing downstream products of phenol and acetone.

In 2021, Deepak Mehta stated that the company also has hydrogenation capabilities, and are also looking to add fluorination to their chemical offerings.

== See also ==
- Gujarat Alkalies and Chemicals Limited
