= ITM Group of Institutions =

Group of educational institutions in India

- Established: 1991
- Chairman: P. V. Ramana
- Location: Navi Mumbai, Maharashtra, India
- Website: www.itm.edu

The ITM Group of Institutions is a group of educational institutions in India, headquartered in Mumbai, Maharashtra, India, which and is managed by the ITM Trust. It was founded in 1991 by founder and chairman Dr P. V. Ramana.

Institutions established by the group include two universities, ITM University, Raipur and ITM Vocational University.

== ITM business schools ==
The ITM business schools offer a 2-year full-time AICTE Post Graduate Diploma in Management program. They include:

- ITM Business School, Bengaluru in Bengaluru, Karnataka, established in 1992
- ITM University, Raipur in Raipur, Chhattisgarh, established in 2012
- ITM Business School, Chennai, in Chennai, Tamil Nadu, established in 1993
- ITM Business School Navi Mumbai, in Navi Mumbai, established in 1991
- ITM Business School, Warangal, in Warangal, Telangana, established in 1995
- ITM Institute of Financial Markets, established in 2004 in Navi Mumbai
- ITM Skills University, Kharghar, in Kharghar, Maharashtra, established in 2023

== ITM Executive Education Centre ==
The ITM Group of Institutions offer a 2-year weekend Executive Management program in multiple Centres across Mumbai, Navi Mumbai, Bangalore, Chennai, etc.

- ITM EEC, Bengaluru, Karnataka
- ITM EEC, Vashi, Kharghar, Dombivli, Thane, Sion, Vile Parle, Kandivali
- ITM EEC, Chennai
- ITM EEC, Pune

== Undergraduate schools ==
- ITM Institute of Hotel Management (ITM-IHM), founded in 2002
- ITM Institute of Fashion, Design and Technology (ITM IFDT)
- ITM Institute of Health Sciences (ITM-IHS)
- ITM College of Engineering, Nagpur
- Coastal Institute For Technology and Management
- ITM Institute of Design & Media (ITM-IDM), Mumbai

== Universities ==
The ITM group has established two private universities, ITM University, Raipur establish in 2012 and ITM Vocational University, Vadodara, established in 2014.
