= Gujarat Alkalies and Chemicals Limited =

Manufacturer of chemical substance

- Company type: Public
- Traded as: BSE: 530001; NSE: GUJALKALI
- Industry: Chemicals
- Founded: 1973
- Headquarters: Vadodara, Gujarat, India
- Key people: Hasmukh Adhia (Chairman)
- Products: Caustic soda, sodium cyanide, sodium ferrocyanide, hydrochloric acid, chloromethanes, caustic potash, potassium carbonate, phosphoric acid (85%) and hydrogen peroxide.
- Revenue: ▲₹3,762.2 crore (US$390 million) (2022)
- Operating income: ▲₹788.39 crore (US$82 million) (2022)
- Net income: ▲₹559.76 crore (US$58 million) (2022)
- Total assets: ▲₹5,890 crore (US$610 million) (2020)
- Owner: Government of Gujarat
- Website: www.gacl.com

Gujarat Alkalies and Chemicals Limited (GACL) is an Indian chemical substance manufacturing company, promoted by the Government of Gujarat. Its manufacturing facilities are located at Dahej and Vadodara in Gujarat. The company manufactures chemicals such as caustic soda, sodium cyanide, chloromethanes, sodium ferrocyanide, caustic potash, potassium carbonate, hydrochloric acid, phosphoric acid (85%) and hydrogen peroxide.

== History ==
GACL was incorporated by Gujarat Industrial Investment Corporation (GIIC) on 29 March 1973. The Government of Gujarat is the owner and major promoter of GACL. The production began in 1976 at the Vadodara plant with a capacity of 37,425 MTPA of caustic soda. The company, along with other corporations like GSFC, Petrofils Co-operative Ltd., and Gujarat Electricity Board, promoted GIPCL Vadodara Gas based Power Station to fulfill electricity demand. After subsequent expansion at both the Vadodara and Dahej plant the total caustic soda productions reach 4,29,050 MTPA.

== GNAL ==
GACL and National Aluminium Company (NALCO) will jointly expand the GACL's plant at Dahej. The joint venture plant, named GNAL, will have a capacity of 266,667 MTPA caustic soda plant along with a 130 MW CPP at Dahej. The equity holding of GACL and NALCO for the GNAL is in the ratio of 60:40. NALCO will purchase a minimum of 50,000 MTPA caustic soda from GNAL for its aluminium refineries.

== See also ==
- Deepak Nitrite
