= ITM Law School =

- Established: 2010
- School type: Private
- Dean: S. Shantha Kumar
- Location: Gurgaon, Delhi NCR, India
- Enrollment: 320
- Faculty: 15

ITM Law School (also known as ITML or ITMLS) is one of the professional graduate schools of ITM University. It is a specialised law school offering courses at undergraduate and postgraduate levels. It is situated in HUDA Sector 23A-Gurgaon, India. ITML is built on the five-year law degree model proposed and implemented by the Bar Council of India. It is a member of the International Association of Law Schools(IALS), USA and also has a chapter of the International Law Students Association (ILSA), USA.

== History ==
ITML was established in 2010 under the leadership of Prof. S. Shantha Kumar (also the Director of MATS Law School, MATS University, Raipur). The University initially offers a 5-year integrated BBA, LL.B (Hons.) degree programme with effect from the Academic Year 2010-11 starting in August, 2010.

== Academics ==
NLUD offers a five year undergraduate (UG) BBA, LL.B. (Hons.) program. Admission is through the scores of All India Law Entrance Test (AILET), Common Law Admission Test (CLAT), Law School Admission Test (LSAT). ITML also offers an LL.M. program. The admission is through percentage of marks secured in LL.B. Degree Examination and the marks secured in the personal interview conducted by the Admissions Committee of ITM University.

== Learning Resource Centre ==
ITML is subscribed to professional law journals such as All India Reporter, Supreme Court Cases, Criminal Law Journal, Divorce & Matrimonial Cases, Company Law Journal, Consumer Protection Judgments, Labour Law Journal, etc. with back volumes. It also procures titles of leading law publishers like LexisNexis Butterworth Wadhwa Nagpur, Eastern Book Company and Universal Law Publishing, and plenty of other books on Management and other social sciences. ITML Library works on OPAC technology. It also provides access to Judgments of the Supreme Court and all other High Courts, Orders of the Tribunals (CEGAT, ITAT, SAT, NCDRC, CLB, DRAT, MRTP) with daily updations; Court Rules, Court Fees, Stamp Duties, Bare Acts, Ordinances, Bills in Parliament and more on the Indian Legal System. There is a computer section attached to the library with 20 machines to facilitate online research.

== Collaboration ==
ITM Law School has signed MoU's with the Chartered Institute of Arbitrators(CIArb) and National Law University, Delhi.
