= Thomas Hoeren =

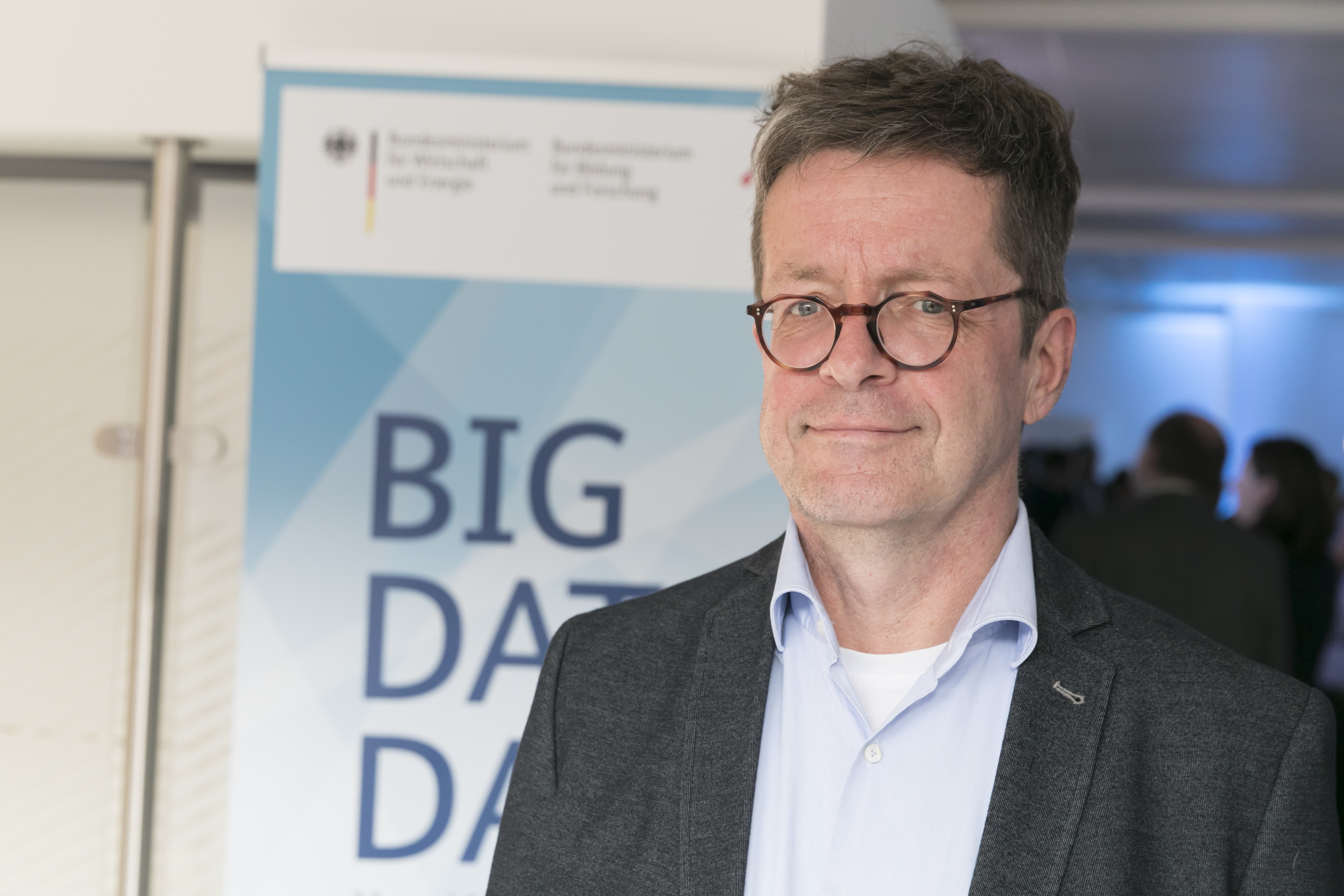
Prof. Dr. Thomas Hoeren (2018)

Thomas Hoeren (born on 22 August 1961 in Dinslaken) is a German law professor and a former court of appeal judge with focus on Information and Media Law.

== Career ==
=== Studies ===
Thomas Hoeren studied Theology and Law at the Universities of Tübingen, Münster and London Guildhall University from 1980 to 1987. In 1986 he graduated from Theology in Münster. From October 1986 to May 1988 he wrote his doctorate's thesis in IT Law at the University of Münster (title of the dissertation: “Softwareüberlassung als Sachkauf” (“Software Licensing as a Product Purchase”)). In May 1994, Thomas Hoeren qualified as a professor of Civil Law (degree: Dr. habil.) at the Faculty of Law of the University of Münster (title: "Selbstregulierung im Banken- und Versicherungsrecht" ("Problems in competition law with regard to self-regulation in the banking and insurance sector")).

=== Academic career ===
Hoeren taught at the Faculty of Law of the Heinrich-Heine-University Düsseldorf from April 1994 to June 1997. He was appointed as professor of Information, Media and Business Law at the Faculty of Law of the University of Münster and Head of the Institute for Information, Telecommunication and Media Law in June 1997. This Institute deals with Civil Law, Public Law and Criminal Law on the Information Law sector and conducts research on Industrial Property Rights and E-Learning. Since 2004 Hoeren is appointed a Research Fellow at the Oxford Internet Institute of the Balliol College (Oxford). Since 2004 Hoeren was also a lecturer at the Academy of Art of Münster. Additionally, he is a lecturer for Information and IT law at the University of Zurich and the University of Vienna. Since 2006 he is a liaison lecturer of the German National Merit Foundation (Studienstiftung des Deutschen Volkes).

- Hoeren is an editorial member of the magazine "Computer und Recht" and a co-editor of the magazines "Information and Communications Technology Law" and "EDI Law Review" since 1997.
- In 1998, he was named co-editor of the magazine Multimedia und Recht (MMR).
- In May 2005 he became editor for "Informatik und Recht" of the Swiss juridical professional journal "Jusletter".
- Hoeren is an editorial advisor of the educational magazine "Ad Legendum".

=== Legal career ===
From June 1996 until the end of 2011 Hoeren was a Judge at the Court of Appeals in Düsseldorf (IP Law senate). Hoeren was one of the legal advisors of the European Commission (DG XIII) at the “Legal Advisory Board on Information Technology”. Furthermore, he served as legal counsel to the DENIC and is a board member of the Research Center for Information Law of the University of St. Gallen (Switzerland). Since June 2000 he is working as a 'domain name panelist' for the WIPO. In 2005 he became a member of the expert committee for Copyright and Publishing Law at the German Union for Intellectual Property Protection. From 2012 to 2014 he was Dean of the Faculty of Law at the University of Muenster. He is as well working as a professional photographer.

== Honours ==
- Thomas Hoeren was honoured with the ALCATEL-SEL research award “Technische Kommunikation” ('Technical Communication') in 2005.
- Nomination as a Member of the European Academy of Science and Art in 2016
- Honered with the Daidalos Silver-Medal of the German National Academic Foundation in 2018
