= In the Morning =

In the Morning is the title of:

== Songs ==
- "In the Morning" (Boom Crash Opera song), 1993
- "In the Morning" (J. Cole song), 2010
- "In the Morning" (The Coral song), 2005
- "In the Morning" (Itzy song), 2021
- "In the Morning" (Jack Johnson song), 2011
- "In the Morning" (Razorlight song), 2006
- "In the Morning" (Ledisi song), 2007
- "In the Morning" (Jennifer Lopez song), 2020
- "Morning of My Life", written by Barry Gibb and originally titled "In the Morning"
- "In the Morning", by Built to Spill from the 1994 album There's Nothing Wrong with Love
- "In the Morning", by Graham Coxon from the 2009 album The Spinning Top
- "In the Morning", by E-40 from the 2011 album Revenue Retrievin': Overtime Shift
- "In the Morning", by Aretha Franklin from the 1998 album A Rose Is Still a Rose
- "In the Morning", by Jefferson Airplane, first released on the 1974 compilation album Early Flight
- "In the Morning", by Low Roar from the album 0, 2014
- "In the Morning", written by Irving Berlin and performed by Al Jolson in the 1930 film Mammy
- "In the Morning", by Junior Boys from the 2006 album So This Is Goodbye
- "In the Morning", by Soulsavers from the 2012 album The Light the Dead See
- "In the Morning", by the Trews from the 2014 album The Trews

== See also ==
- "Into the Morning" (song), by Canadian band the Weekend, 2005
- ITM (disambiguation)
