= Vadodara Bus Station =

Bus station in Gujarat, India

Vadodara Central Bus Station
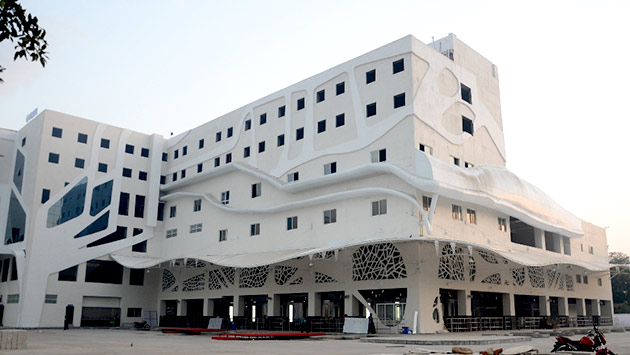
- Vadodara Bus Station

General information
- Location: Vadodara; Gujarat; India
- Coordinates: 22.313531°N 73.181417°E
- System: Public Transport
- Owner: Government of Gujarat
- Operator: Gujarat State Road Transport (GSRTC)
- Bus routes: Gujarat; Rajasthan; Maharashtra; Madhya Pradesh
- Bus operators: GSRTC; RSRTC; MSRTC; MPSRTC

Construction
- Parking: available
- Accessible: available

History
- Opened: 15 February 2014

Passengers
- 2014: 28,000 – 35,000 per day
Location

The Vadodara bus station or Vadodara Central Bus Terminal is the central bus station serving Vadodara city in Gujarat, India.

== History ==
The bus station was built under a public-private partnership between the Gujarat State Road Transport Corporation (GSRTC) and realty firm Cube Construction. The building is known as the Ved Transcube Plaza. Built at a cost of ₹114 crore (US$12 million), the five-storey station is spread over 2.4 lakh square feet. The station handles over 800 buses and as many as 28,000 to 35,000 passengers daily. The commercial complex of the station building has 400 retail shops of an average 250 to 350 square feet each, a flea market, a food court with 22 outlets, a seven-screen multiplex run by PVR Cinemas and a 100-room budget hotel.

The design of exterior takes inspiration from the banyan tree which is associated with the name of the city.

It was inaugurated by then Gujarat Chief Minister Narendra Modi on 15 February 2014.
