= Vadodara =

Vadodara Baroda
- Metropolis
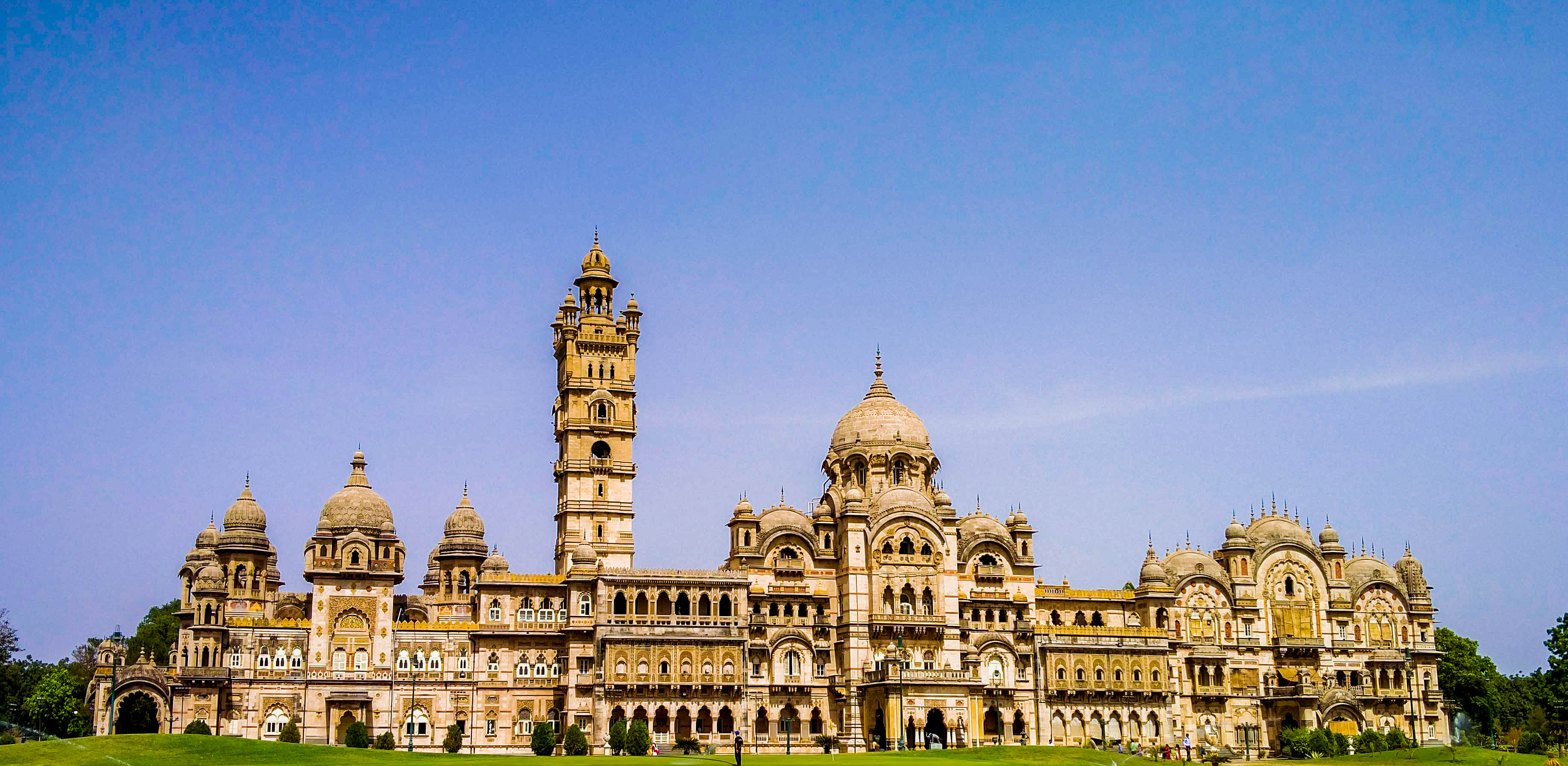
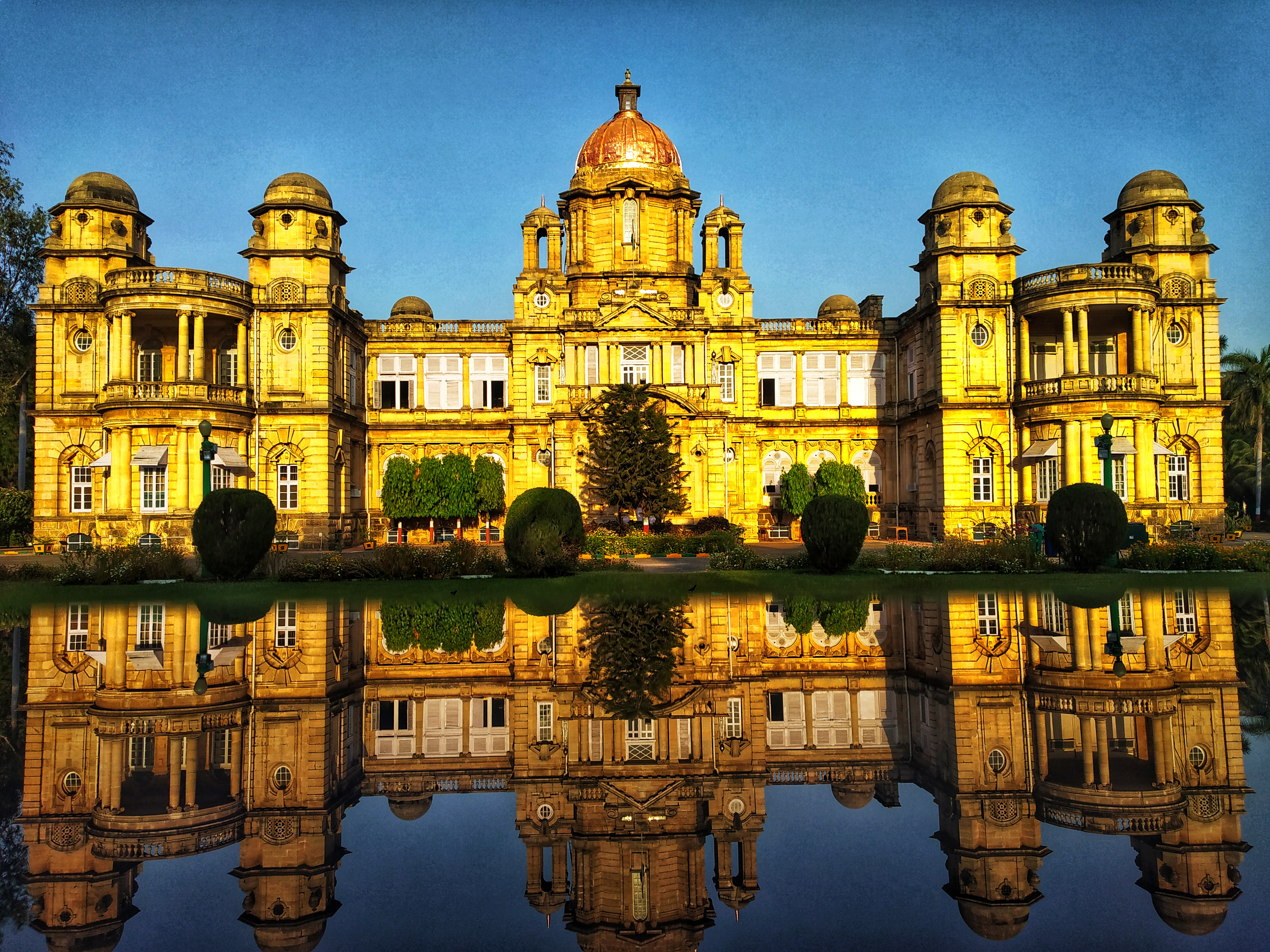
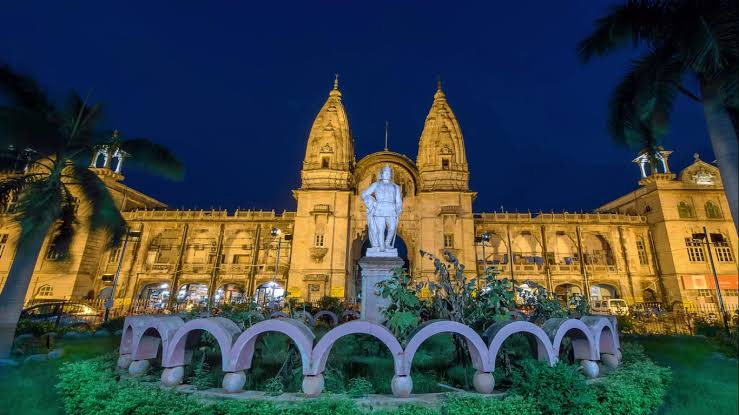
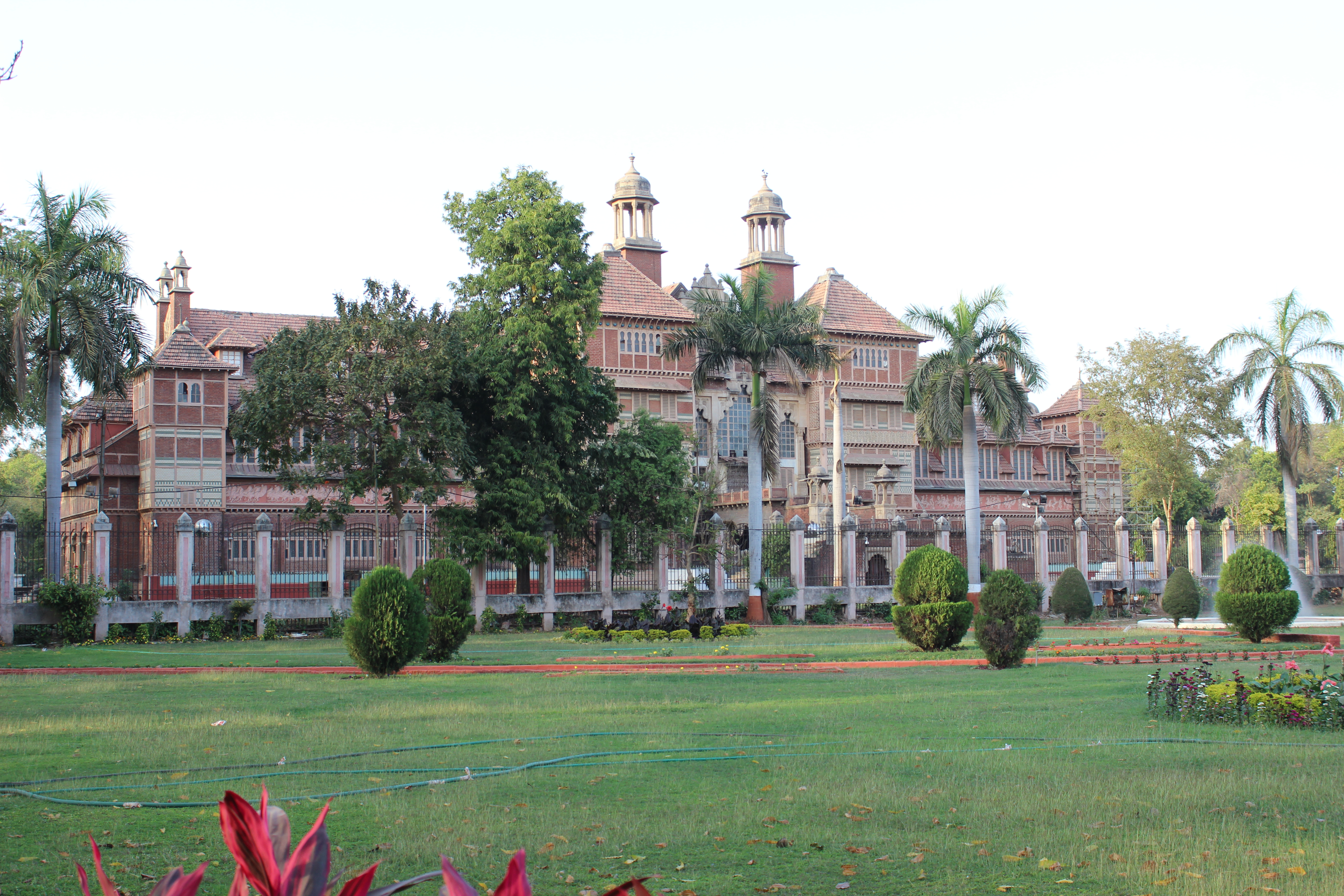
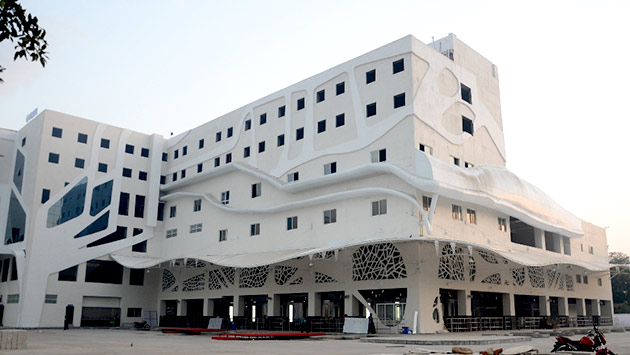
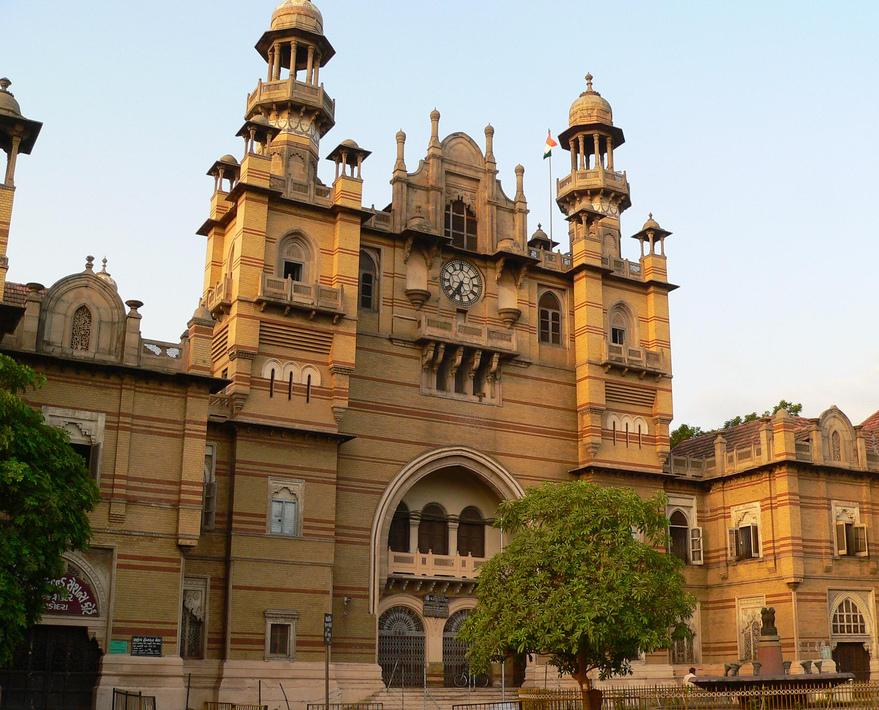
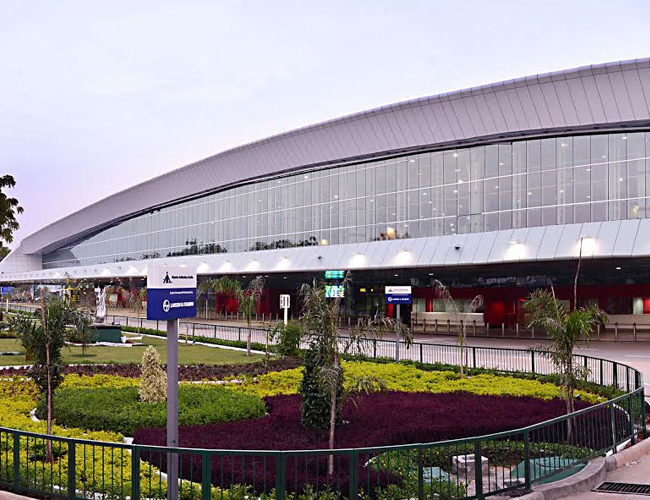
- Clockwise from top: Lakshmi Vilas Palace, Khanderao Market, Central Bus Terminal, Vadodara Airport, Nyay Mandir, Baroda Museum, Pratap Vilas Palace
- Nicknames: Sayaji Nagari (City of Sayajirao), Sanskrutik Nagari (Cultural City), Kala Nagari (City of Art)
- Location within the Indian state of Gujarat Location within India
- Coordinates: 22°18′N 73°12′E
- Country: India
- State: Gujarat
- District: Vadodara

Government
  - Type: Municipal Corporation
  - Body: Vadodara Municipal Corporation
  - Mayor: Geetaben Makwana (BJP)
  - Deputy Mayor: Aditya Patel

Area
  - Metropolis: 420.33 km^{2} (162.29 sq mi)
- Elevation: 35.5 m (116 ft)

Population (2022)
  - Metropolis: 3,100,260
  - Rank: 20th (3rd in Gujarat)
  - Density: 7,375.8/km^{2} (19,103/sq mi)
  - Metro: 3.50 million
  - Metro rank: 22nd
- Demonym: Barodian
- Time zone: UTC+5:30 (IST)
- PIN: 390 0XX
- Telephone code: (91)265
- ISO 3166 code: ISO 3166-2:IN
- Vehicle registration: GJ-06 (Urban), GJ-29 (Rural)
- Literacy Rate: 94.5%
- Legislature Strength: 76
- Lok Sabha constituency: Vadodara
- Vidhan Sabha constituency: 10
- Climate: Tropical savanna (Köppen: Aw)
- Urban planning agency: VUDA
- Website: www.vmc.gov.in

Vadodara (Gujarati: [ˌʋəˈɖo.d̪ɾɐ̯]), also known as Baroda, is a city on the banks of the Vishwamitri River in the Indian state of Gujarat. It serves as the administrative headquarters of the Vadodara district. The city is named for its abundance of banyan (vad) trees. Vadodara is also locally referred to as the Sanskrutik Nagari (transl. 'Cultural City') and Kala Nagari (transl. 'City of Art') of India.

The city is prominent for landmarks such as the Laxmi Vilas Palace, which served as the residence of the Maratha royal Gaekwad dynasty that ruled over Baroda State. It is also the home of the Maharaja Sayajirao University of Baroda.

== Etymology ==
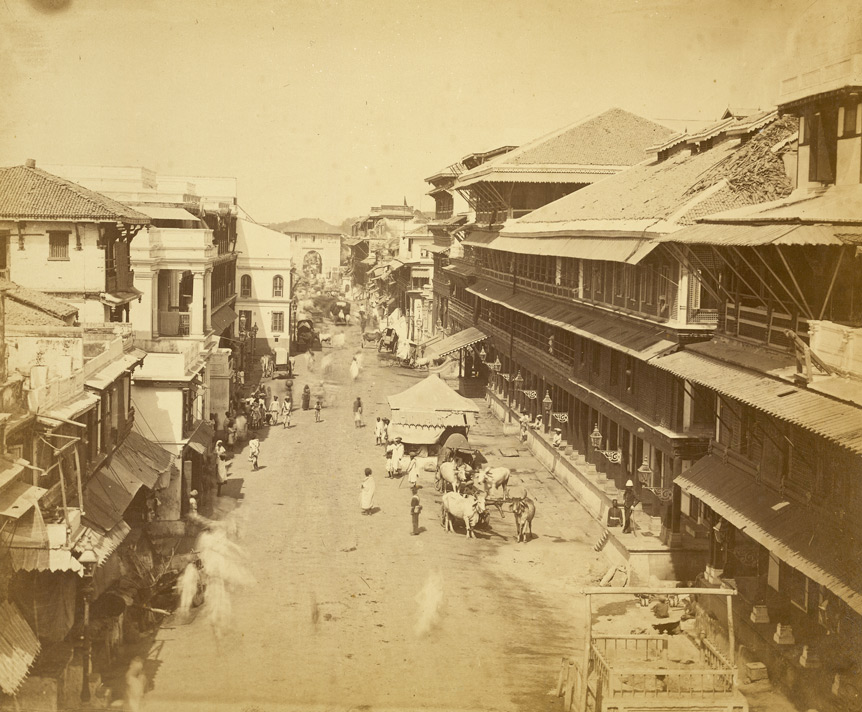
Street scene in Baroda (circa 1880)

The city was once called Chandanavati after Raja Chandan of the Dod Parmar Rajputs. The capital was also known as Virakshetra (Land of Warriors). Later, it was known as Vadpatraka or Vadodará, and according to tradition, is a corrupt form of the Sanskrit word vatodara, meaning "in the belly of the banyan tree". It is, as of 2009, almost impossible to ascertain when the various changes in the name were made; early English travelers and merchants of the 15th century mention the town as Baroda, and it is from this that the name Baroda is derived; in 1974 (well after independence), the official name of the city was changed to Vadodara.

== History ==
=== Prehistory ===
At Akota, now a suburb of Vadodara, excavations have found rich microlith deposits, providing early evidence of habitation in the area. These prehistoric people took part in hunting and fishing and lived no later than 1000 BCE.

=== First millennium CE ===
By the first centuries CE, Akota was the site of a commercial town with far-reaching trade links. Known in antiquity as Aṅkoṭṭaka, it had well-built houses made from burnt bricks. Two re-struck coins of the early Western Satraps have been found here, along with artifacts possibly of Greco-Roman origin. A Gupta-era coin has also been found here.

Akota flourished under the Maitraka dynasty, although it experienced periodic severe flooding. A huge hoard of Jain bronzes, largely dating from this period, was found at Akota's old site, indicating that the city was a centre of Jainism. The bronzes include images of various tirthankaras as well as an elephant-shaped incense burner. Many of them have inscriptions that have been used to indicate when they were made.

In the 6th century, the town's inhabitants shifted away from the river to a new site near Akota's modern centre. At Kothi, which also now forms part of Vadodara, evidence of habitation also first emerges during this period.

An early mention of Vadodara itself is in an 812 copper-plate grant of the Rashtrakuta dynasty. It records Karka Suvarṇavasha, second ruler of the Lata branch of the Rashtrakutas, giving the village of Vaḍapadraka, in the province of Aṅkoṭṭaka and identified with present-day Vadodara, to a Brahmin from Valabhi. Meanwhile, Akota continued to flourish during this period.

=== Chaulukya period: from village to city ===
By the 11th century, under the Chaulukya dynasty, Vadodara appears to have gained in importance. A plate dated to 1077 mentions a battle on the bank of the Vishvamitri river in the vishaya of Vaṭapadraka, which had evidently replaced the earlier province of Aṅkoṭṭaka. The Akota bronzes continue until the 11th century but cease thereafter. The main centre of Jainism in the area shifted to Vadodara. By this period, Vadodara is referred to as a pura, or city, rather than just a village.

A manuscript of the Panchavastuka written at Vadodara in 1123 indicates that the province of Lāṭa was then governed by Santūka, a minister of the Chaulukya king Jayasimha Siddharaja. At some point, Santūka organised a rathayatra, or chariot procession, at Vaṭapadraka. Several other manuscripts from Vadodara are known from this period, including a Prakrit work composed by Chandraprabhasuri in 1128 along with two copies of Jain works made in 1156 and 1168 respectively. Another manuscript, although copied at Dabhoi, was written by a scribe named Vosari whose father was a pandit named Kesava who came from Vadodara.

During this period, merchants from Vadodara contributed to the temples at the Chaulukya capital of Patan. At some point, the minister Tejpal, returning from a victory at Godhra, stopped at Vadodara for several days and renovated the local shrine of Parshvanatha. Around 1264, shrines to Mahavira and Adishvara were built at Vadodara by one Pethad Shah.

=== Delhi Sultanate ===
Under the Delhi Sultanate, Vadodara was home to a group of Afghan amirs known collectively as the Amir-i Sadgan, or "the nobles of the hundred", because each one commanded a force of 100 cavalry. In 1344, during the reign of Muhammad bin Tughluq, they revolted. Led by one Qazi Jalal, they defeated Muqbil, the sultan's main deputy in Gujarat, in a decisive battle near Dabhoi. They went on to occupy a large territory stretching from Kadi in the north to Bharuch in the south, and from Khambhat in the west to the hill country in the east. In 1345, Muhammad bin Tughluq led an army to Gujarat to put down the rebellion and, after initially camping at Pandu Mewas, defeated them in battle at Bharuch.

=== Gujarat Sultanate ===
Muzaffar Shah I, founder of the Gujarat Sultanate, appointed his son Firuz Khan as governor of Vadodara at some point. After Muzaffar Shah's death in 1411, he was succeeded by his grandson Ahmad Shah I (Firuz's nephew). Firuz immediately laid claim to the throne. Because the sultanate's central authority in central and southern Gujarat was weak at this point, Firuz had little trouble assembling an army at Vadodara. He then marched to Nadiad and then to Bharuch, which he seized by force. Ultimately, the rebellion dissipated without a pitched battle: internal tensions had already arisen among Firuz Khan's main allies, and when Ahmad Shah offered them amnesty in return for standing down, they readily complied. Firuz Khan was forgiven and given Navsari as a jagir, thus giving up his position as governor of Vadodara.

In 1451, Vadodara was sacked by troops under Mahmud Khalji, ruler of the Malwa Sultanate. Later, during the reign of Mahmud Begada, a major re-foundation of Vadodara took place. A new city called Daulatabad was built, close to the old site. The Muslim name evidently did not stick, but the city itself did, and this new foundation became the basis for the modern city of Vadodara. A later atlas by John Ogilby refers to people moving from the old town to the new one.

=== Mughal Empire ===
After Akbar conquered Gujarat in 1573, he gave Vadodara to one Nawab Aurang Khan. There was an administrative reform under Akbar's reign, and Raja Todar Mal conducted a land survey of parts of Gujarat. Vadodara, however, does not seem to have been included in this survey.

In the late 1600s, Gujarat was increasingly attacked by Maratha and Koli raids. One raid, by the Kolis, hit Vadodara in 1705; they looted the city for two days.

== Geography ==
Vadodara is located at 22.30°N 73.19°E in western India at an elevation of 128 ft (39 m). It is the 10th-largest city in India with an area of 400 km^{2} (150 sq mi) and a population of 3.5 million, according to the 2010–11 census. The city sits on the banks of the Vishwamitri River, in central Gujarat. The Vishwamitri frequently dries up in the summer, leaving only a small stream of water. The city is located on the fertile plain between the Mahi and Narmada Rivers. According to the Bureau of Indian Standards, the cosmopolis falls under seismic zone-III, on a scale of I to V (in order of increasing proneness to earthquakes).

=== Climate ===
Vadodara features a borderline tropical savanna climate (Köppen Aw) that despite the roughly 950 mm or 37 in of rain that the city receives annually is due to the area's high potential evapotranspiration very close to being classified as a hot semi-arid climate (BSh). There are three main seasons: summer, monsoon and winter. Aside from the monsoon season, the climate is dry. The weather is hot during March to July, when the average maximum is 39 °C or 102.2 °F, and the average minimum is 24 °C or 75.2 °F. From November to February, the average maximum temperature is 30 °C or 86 °F, the average minimum is 15 °C or 59 °F, and the climate is extremely dry. Cold northerly winds are responsible for mildly chilly days in January. The southwest monsoon brings a humid climate from mid-June to mid-September. The average rainfall is 95 cm (37 in), but infrequent, torrential rains cause the river to flood like the 2005 Gujarat flood or the 2008 Indian floods, which were catastrophic.

The highest recorded temperature was 46.7 °C (116.1 °F) on 11 May 1960 crossed with 48.0 °C (118.4 °F) on 19 May 2016, while the lowest recorded temperature was −1.1 °C (30.0 °F) on 15 January 1935.

Climate data for Vadodara Airport (1991-2020, extremes 1952-present)
Month	Jan	Feb	Mar	Apr	May	Jun	Jul	Aug	Sep	Oct	Nov	Dec	Year
Record high °C (°F)	37.4 (99.3)	40.6 (105.1)	44.2 (111.6)	45.9 (114.6)	46.2 (115.2)	45.6 (114.1)	40.1 (104.2)	39.1 (102.4)	41.1 (106.0)	41.4 (106.5)	39.4 (102.9)	37.2 (99.0)	46.2 (115.2)
Mean daily maximum °C (°F)	29.4 (84.9)	32.1 (89.8)	36.5 (97.7)	39.3 (102.7)	40.1 (104.2)	37.3 (99.1)	32.6 (90.7)	31.7 (89.1)	33.2 (91.8)	35.8 (96.4)	33.8 (92.8)	30.8 (87.4)	34.4 (93.9)
Mean daily minimum °C (°F)	13.2 (55.8)	15.4 (59.7)	19.7 (67.5)	24.2 (75.6)	27.4 (81.3)	27.6 (81.7)	26.1 (79.0)	25.5 (77.9)	25.2 (77.4)	22.7 (72.9)	18.0 (64.4)	14.3 (57.7)	21.6 (70.9)
Record low °C (°F)	2.8 (37.0)	3.9 (39.0)	9.3 (48.7)	14.4 (57.9)	19.4 (66.9)	21.2 (70.2)	22.2 (72.0)	21.7 (71.1)	18.1 (64.6)	12.8 (55.0)	6.0 (42.8)	5.5 (41.9)	2.8 (37.0)
Average rainfall mm (inches)	4.4 (0.17)	0.0 (0.0)	0.1 (0.00)	1.3 (0.05)	3.6 (0.14)	128.8 (5.07)	363.7 (14.32)	316.1 (12.44)	163.0 (6.42)	15.5 (0.61)	3.7 (0.15)	2.0 (0.08)	1,001.1 (39.41)
Average rainy days	0.3	0.0	0.0	0.1	0.2	4.2	13.8	12.2	6.8	1.2	0.3	0.2	39.4
Average relative humidity (%) (at 17:30 IST)	38	31	26	24	32	52	74	74	65	46	41	42	45
Source: India Meteorological Department

Vadodara has been ranked 6th best “National Clean Air City” (under Category 1 >10L Population cities) in India.

== Demographics ==
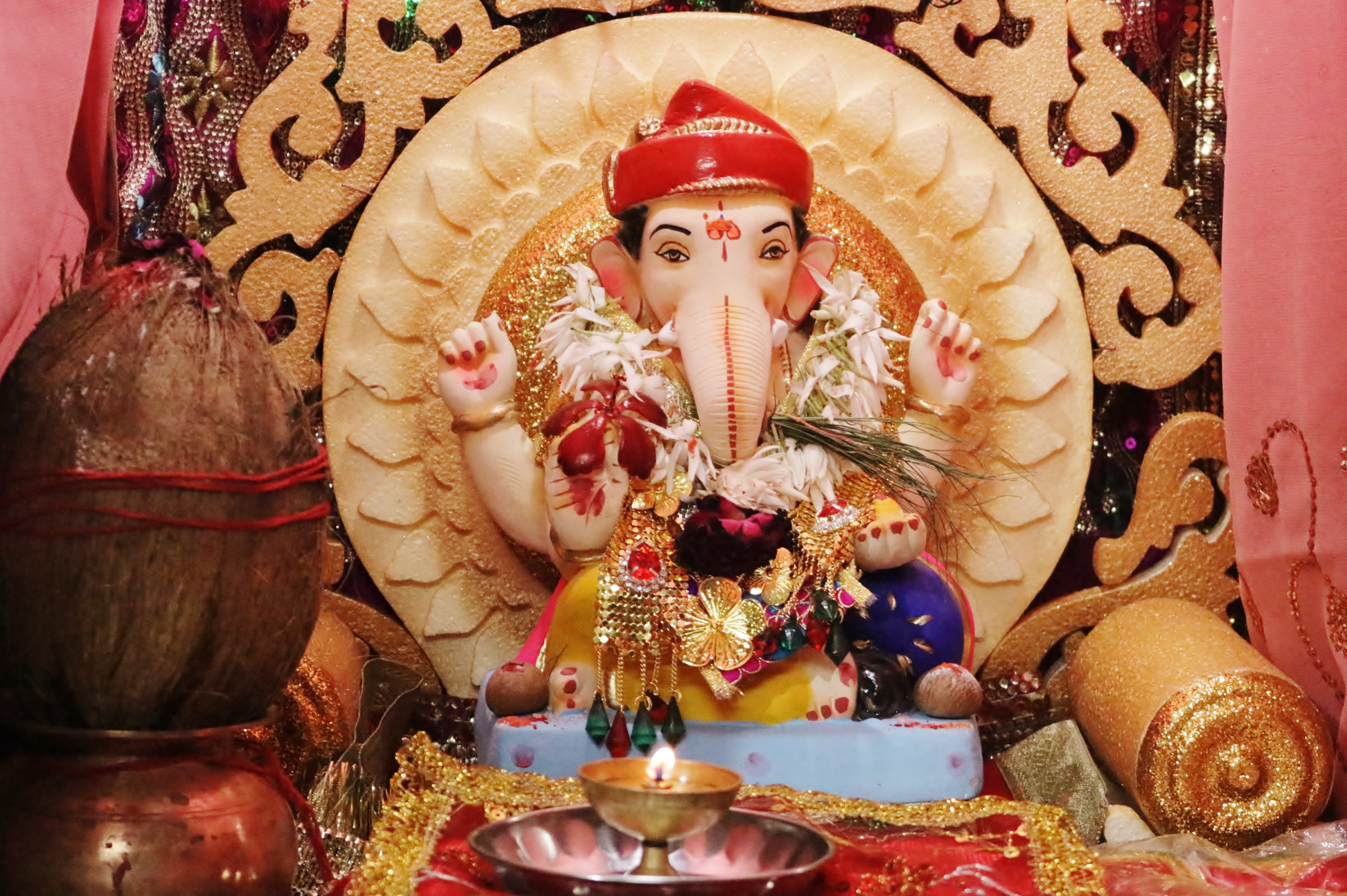
Ganesh Chaturthi Celebration at JKSP Home Vadodara

At the time of the 2011 census of India, Vadodara Municipal Corporation and associated outgrowths had a population of 1,670,806. About 9.45% of the population was under 6 years of age. Vadodara had a sex ratio of 920 females per 1000 males and a literacy rate of 90.48%. Scheduled Castes and Scheduled Tribes made up 6.63% and 4.07% of the population, respectively.

Religions in Vadodara (2011)
Hinduism	85.39%
Islam	11.20%
Jainism	2.02%
Christianity	0.82%
Sikhism	0.45%
Other or not stated	0.20%
Distribution of religions

Hinduism was the main religion, practiced by 85.39% of the population. Islam was the second-largest religion (11.20%). Jains were 2.02%, Christians 0.82%, and Sikhs 0.45%.

Historical population
Year	Pop.	±%
1820	100,000	—
1865	140,000	+40.0%
1881	101,800	−27.3%
1891	116,400	+14.3%
1901	103,790	−10.8%
1911	99,345	−4.3%
1921	94,712	−4.7%
1931	112,860	+19.2%
1941	153,301	+35.8%
1951	211,407	+37.9%
1961	309,716	+46.5%
1968	400,700	+29.4%
1971	467,487	+16.7%
1981	734,473	+57.1%
1991	1,031,346	+40.4%
2001	1,338,244	+29.8%
2011	1,670,806	+24.9%

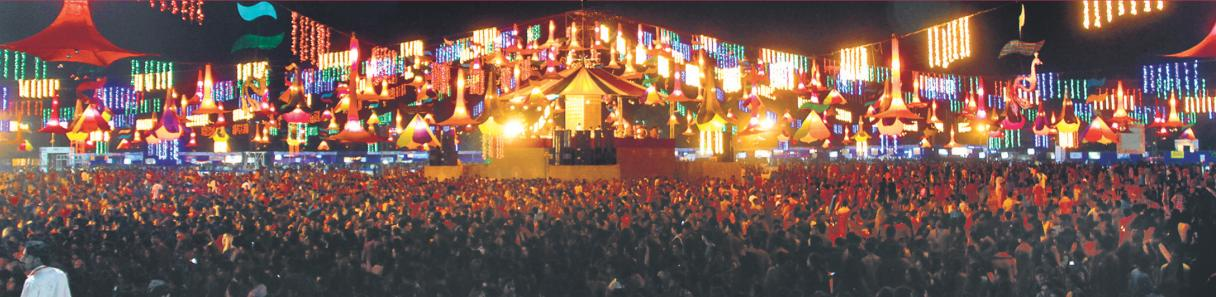
United Way of Baroda Navratri Garba Festival
Languages of Vadodara (2011)
1. Gujarati (71.4%)
2. Hindi (14.8%)
3. Marathi (7.60%)
4. Sindhi (1.91%)
5. Others (4.29%)

At the time of the 2011 census, 71.37% of the population spoke Gujarati, 14.83% Hindi, 7.60% Marathi and 1.91% Sindhi as their first language.

== Economy ==
In Vadodara, various large-scale industries such as Gujarat Refinery of Indian Oil Corporation, Gujarat State Fertilizers & Chemicals, Vadodara Manufacturing Division (formerly IPCL) of Reliance Industries Limited, Deepak Nitrite, Parikh Industries, Linde Engineering India, and Gujarat Alkalies and Chemicals Limited have come up in the vicinity of Gujarat Refinery. Other large-scale public-sector units are Heavy Water Project, Gujarat Industries Power Company Limited (GIPCL), Oil and Natural Gas Corporation and Gas Authority of India Limited. Vadodara is also a manufacturing hub of power equipment, rail coaches, and defense aircraft, and several IT sector companies in Vadodara are rapidly growing. Vadodara is also a hub of pharmaceutical industries; many pharmaceutical companies are located within and nearby. Vadodara is home to many big pharmaceutical companies, and is a major hub of pharmaceutical industries in Gujarat.

Located in Vadodara are over 35% of India's power-transmission and distribution equipment manufacturers and an estimated 800 ancillaries supporting the big players in power sector equipment manufacturing and engineering industry. Larsen & Tourbo (L&T) has established "Knowledge City" in Vadodara. This Knowledge City is the hub of several key businesses of the L&T Group. The power business, mid- and downstream Hydrocarbon, L&T Technology Services, and the engineering joint venture L&T-Sargent & Lundy operate out of the facility. It also houses manufacturing facilities for switchgear, air circuit breakers, and moulded-case circuit breakers.

Bombardier Transportation, a Canadian company, has established a rail-coach manufacturing plant in Savli along with other manufacturing companies such as Alstom, Siemens, and Voltas. This plant manufactures coaches for Delhi Metro and the New Generation Rollingstock for Brisbane, Australia. The plant is also manufacturing trainsets for Delhi - Meerut RRTS. Beside this Vadodara holds a key position in Gujarat's pharmaceutical industry, as many small and big pharma companies are located in Vadodara.

Tata Advanced Systems Limited, a subsidiary of Tata Group and Airbus joint venture, has set up a C-295 transport aircraft manufacturing facility at Vadodara as part of a Rs 22,000 crore deal to supply 56 such aircraft. The C-295 will replace the Avro aircraft in service with the Indian Air Force. This project will make Vadodara a defense manufacturing hub. The first "Made in India" aircraft is expected in September 2026.

The revenue for the city is generated through taxes, service provision, and state government assistance. The taxes include general taxes, conservancy taxes, and water taxes, whereas the nontax or service revenue can include water charges, rent from municipal properties, public service charges, etc. The VMC budget for the year 2020–2021 against the proposed budget of Rs 3,554 crore last year, stood at Rs 3,770 crore this year.

=== Petrochemicals ===
Since the discovery of oil and natural gas in the area, Vadodara has become the site of various petrochemical industries. These are concentrated in the peri-urban areas to the northwest and south of the city proper.

In 1963, construction began on Gujarat Refinery outside of Vadodara, on a 1800-acre tract surrounded by the villages of Koyali, Ranoli, Karachia, and Dhanora. Jawaharlal Nehru ceremonially laid the foundation. The refinery's first trial production was in October 1965. As of 1973 it was producing 4.3 million tonnes of various products per year and it employed some 1,450 people. It was the third public-sector refinery to be built in India.

Among the refinery's products as of 1979 were gasoline, diesel fuel, kerosene, jet fuel, and various industrial materials such as benzene, toluene, and naphtha. Crude was piped in from Ankleshwar and from northern Gujarat (around Kalol and Vadagam), and condensate was also supplied from the Khambhat gas fields.

In early 1978, two new petrochemical plants began operation in Vadodara: a naphtha cracking plant in March and a low-density polyethylene plant with an 80,000-tonne capacity in April. Both were operated by Indian Petrochemicals Corporation Limited (now part of Reliance Industries) and both were also the first plant of their kind in Gujarat. In March 1979, IPCL also formally commissioned a major petrochemical complex at Vadodara that included an aromatics plant (producing dimethyl terephthalate and two types of xylene), an oil refinery, and seven other downstream facilities. The 7 downstream facilities were: 1. acrylonitrile, 2. synthetic rubber, 3. low-density polyethylene, 4. polypropylene, 5. ethylene glycol, 6. detergent alkylate, and 7. acrylic fibre. There were also plans in the works for a polyester yarn plant as part of the complex with a capacity of 3,500 to 7,000 tonnes per year.

== Government and politics ==
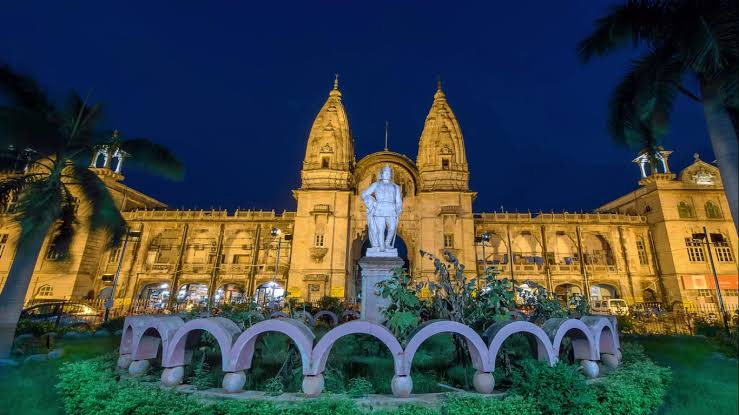
Khanderao Market – Vadodara Mahanagar Seva Sadan Building

Vadodara City Officials
Mayor	Pinky Soni
Municipal Commissioner	Arun Mahesh Babu
Police Commissioner	Narsimha N. Komar

The Vadodara city's municipal corporation or Maha Nagar Palika is a part of the Vadodara district. The district is set up in three distinct levels of administration, which are the collectorate - the district falls under the jurisdiction of a collector; the prant offices which take care of the affairs of taluka and other state government offices and the mamlatdar or taluka offices. The overall district administration has four departments: city survey, district supply office, district planning office, and district election office.

The City elects one member to the Lok Sabha (parliament) and five to the Gujarat Vidhan Sabha (Assembly). All of the five assembly seats of Vadodara were won by the BJP during the legislative elections in 2017. In the 2021 VMSS/VMC elections, the BJP won 69 seats, seven seats went to the Congress.

- Election wards: 19
- Seats (Corporators): 76
- Population per ward: 87,826
- Seats reserved for women: 38
- Total voters (as on 1 January 2019): 1,638,300

=== Civic administration ===
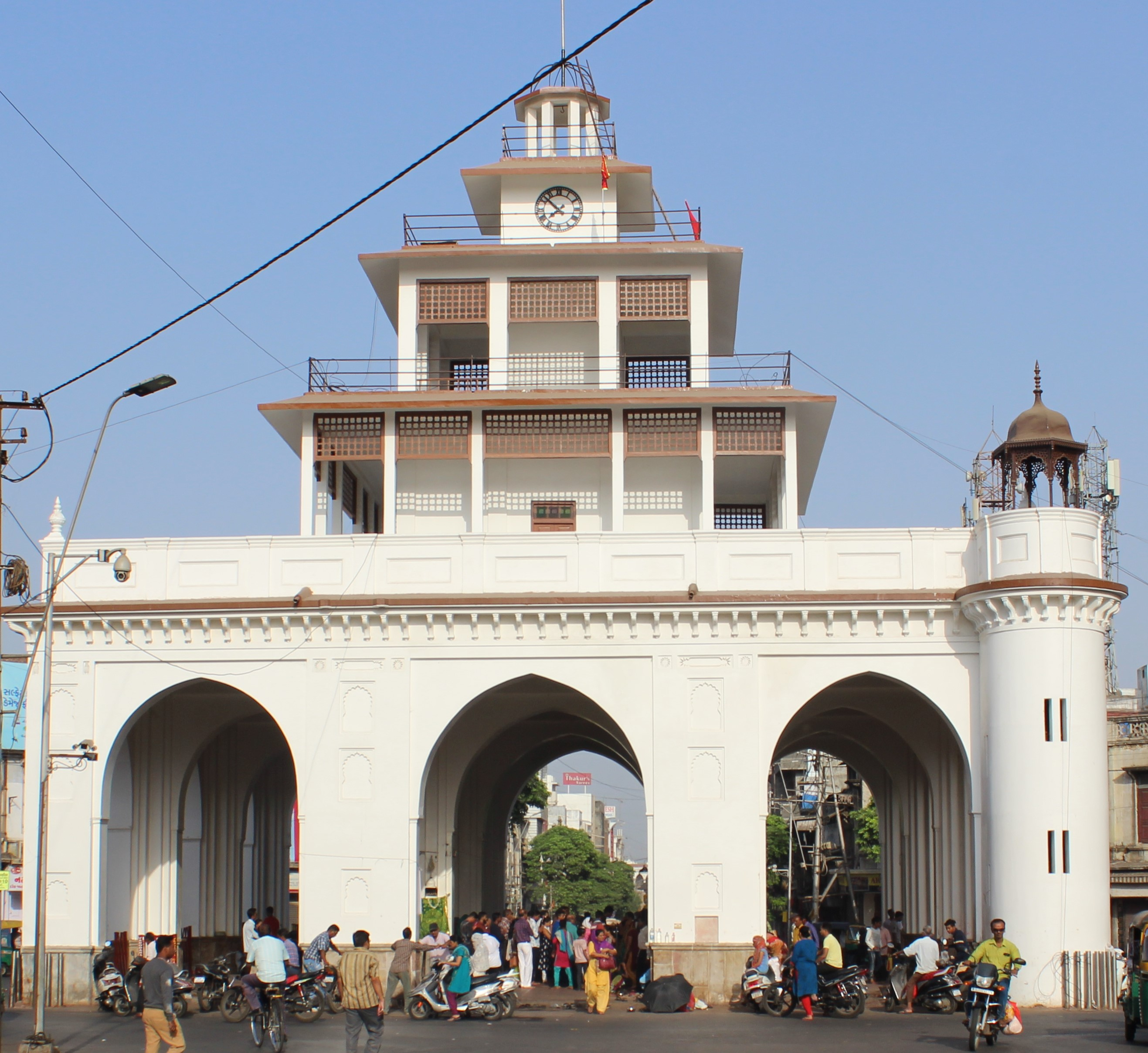
Mandvi Gate

According to the 2011 census, the total Urban Agglomeration (UA) population of Vadodara is 35,17,191. This is governed by the Vadodara Municipal Corporation which was founded in 1951. It was initially called the Baroda Municipal Corporation but later changed to Vadodara Municipal Corporation after the city's name was changed in the year 1974. The Bombay Municipal Corporation Act of 1951 was set up as the main legislation for the administration and governance of the Vadodara Municipal Corporation.

The city limits of Vadodara have expanded since: an area of 148 km^{2} (57 sq mi) was added in the year 2002, followed by 15 to 20 km^{2} (5.8 to 7.7 sq mi) of additional expansion to the north of the city in 2006. The villages Sayajipura, Bapod, Kapurai, Khatamba, Tarsal Kalali, Gorva, Chhani and Vemali were added to the VMC boundaries in 2017 and the latest expansion notice has been given to the seven villages of Sevasi, Bhayli, Vemali, Bil, Karodiya, Undera and Vadadala in the year 2020.

==== City governance ====
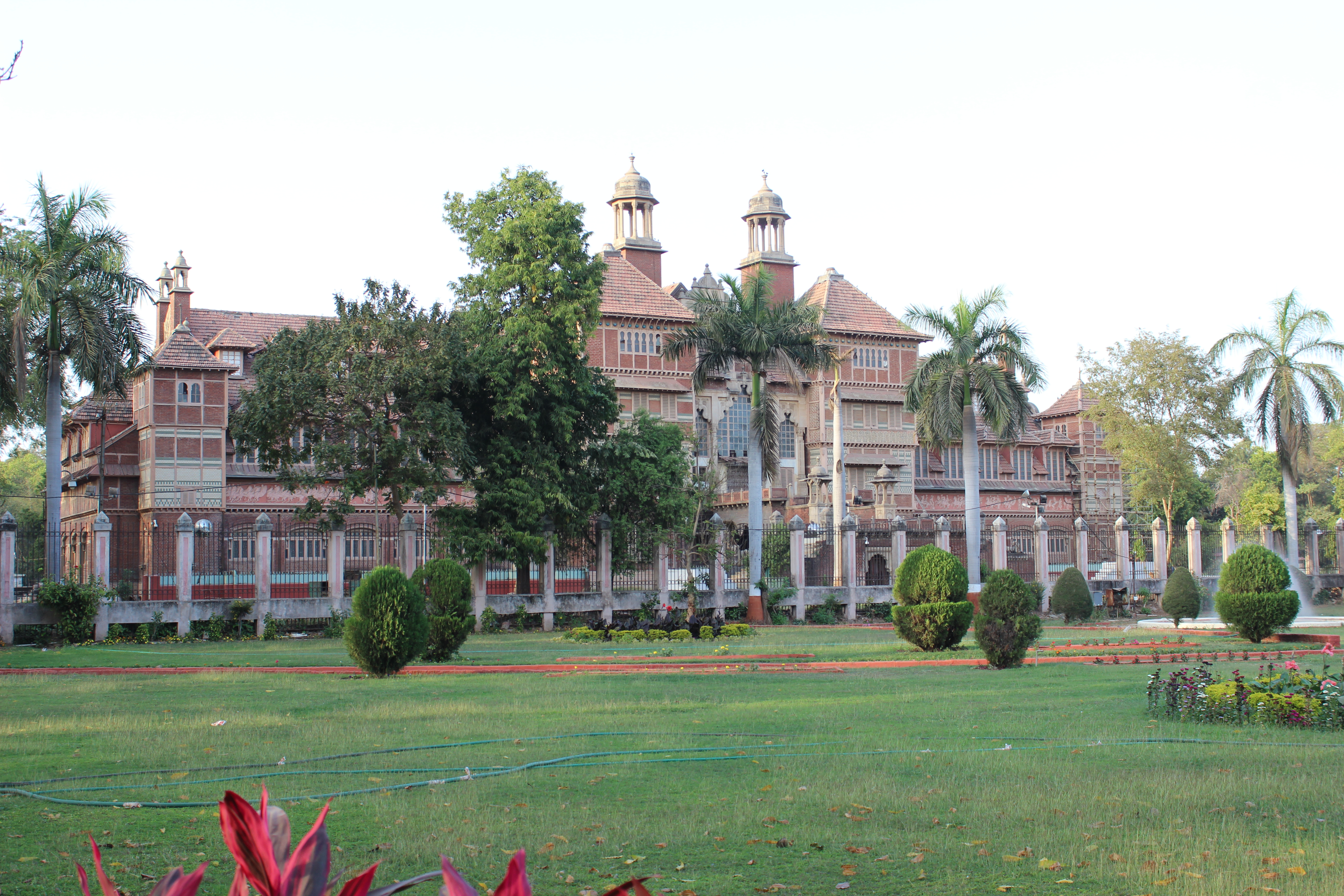
Baroda Museum and Picture Gallery

The Bombay Provincial Municipal Corporations Act, 1949 governs the Vadodara Municipal Corporation. The Gujarat Provincial Municipal Corporations Act of 1949 which is derived from the Bombay Act No. LIX of 1949 is another legislation which most municipal corporation, including Vadodara in Gujarat function under.

The highest body of power in the municipal corporation is the General Board, which is composed of elected members from each ward within the VMC. There are 19 wards under the VMC, each of which consists 4 seats of councilor which has a 50% reservation of seats for women. There are a total of 76 councilors elected for this VMC term where every councilor is appointed in various committees for a period of one year.

The VMC has twelve executive committees apart from the standing committee, which look after the specialized functions of VMC. These committees include public works committee, water work committee, drainage and sewerage committee, health committee, town planning committee, estate management committee, recreation and culture committee, electric committee, and legal committee. Each committee consists of 12 councilors each. The formulation of an additional ward committee is recommended by the Gujarat Provincial Municipal Corporation Act of 1949 for a city exceeding the population of three lakhs- which is above the current population of Vadodara.

==== Politics ====
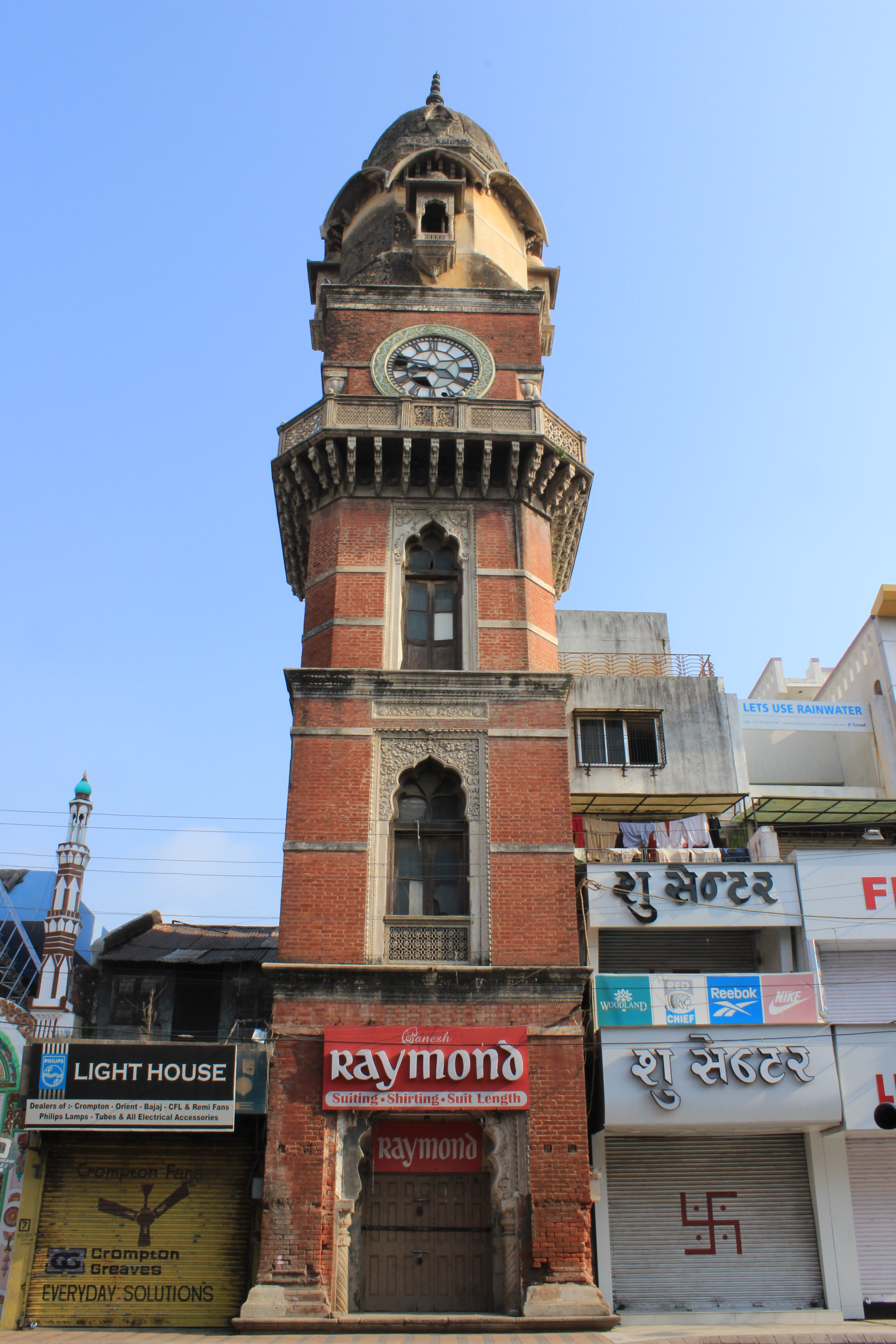
Raopura Tower

Three corporators are elected from each ward, who in turn elect a mayor. Executive powers are vested in the municipal commissioner, who is an IAS officer appointed by the Gujarat state government. The mayor is responsible for the day-to-day running of the city services, municipal school board, the city bus service, the municipal hospital and the city library. The last municipal corporation election for Vadodara took place in the year 2015 where Bhartiya Janta Party won in the majority with 57 out of the total 76 seats, followed by the Indian National Congress (INC) with 14 seats.

There are six sitting MLAs who have VMC under their jurisdiction and are currently part of the state ministry. Rajendrabhai Trivedi is the BJP MLA and incumbent 14th Speaker of Gujarat Legislative Assembly, who was unanimously elected on 9 February 2018. Jitendra Sukhadia is the Minister of Tourism, Non-resident Gujarati division as well as the Food, Civil Supplies, and Consumer Affairs. Saurabhbhai Patel is the incumbent Energy Minister of Gujarat while Yogeshbhai Patel heads the Ministry of State for Narmada Development. The MLA Madhubhai Shrivastav is the state appointed Gujarat Agro Industries Corporation (GAIC) chief and Manisha Vakil is BJP's Vadodara City Assembly Constituency MLA.

==== Law and order ====
The Vadodara City Police are responsible for law enforcement and public safety in Vadodara, Gujarat. The Vadodara City Police is headed by a Police Commissioner, an IPS officer. They are a subdivision of the state police force of Gujarat and are headed by a commissioner. The Vadodara police force is responsible for the protection and safety of Vadodara citizens. Shri Narsimha N. Komar (IPS), is the current Police commissioner of the Vadodara.

== Culture ==
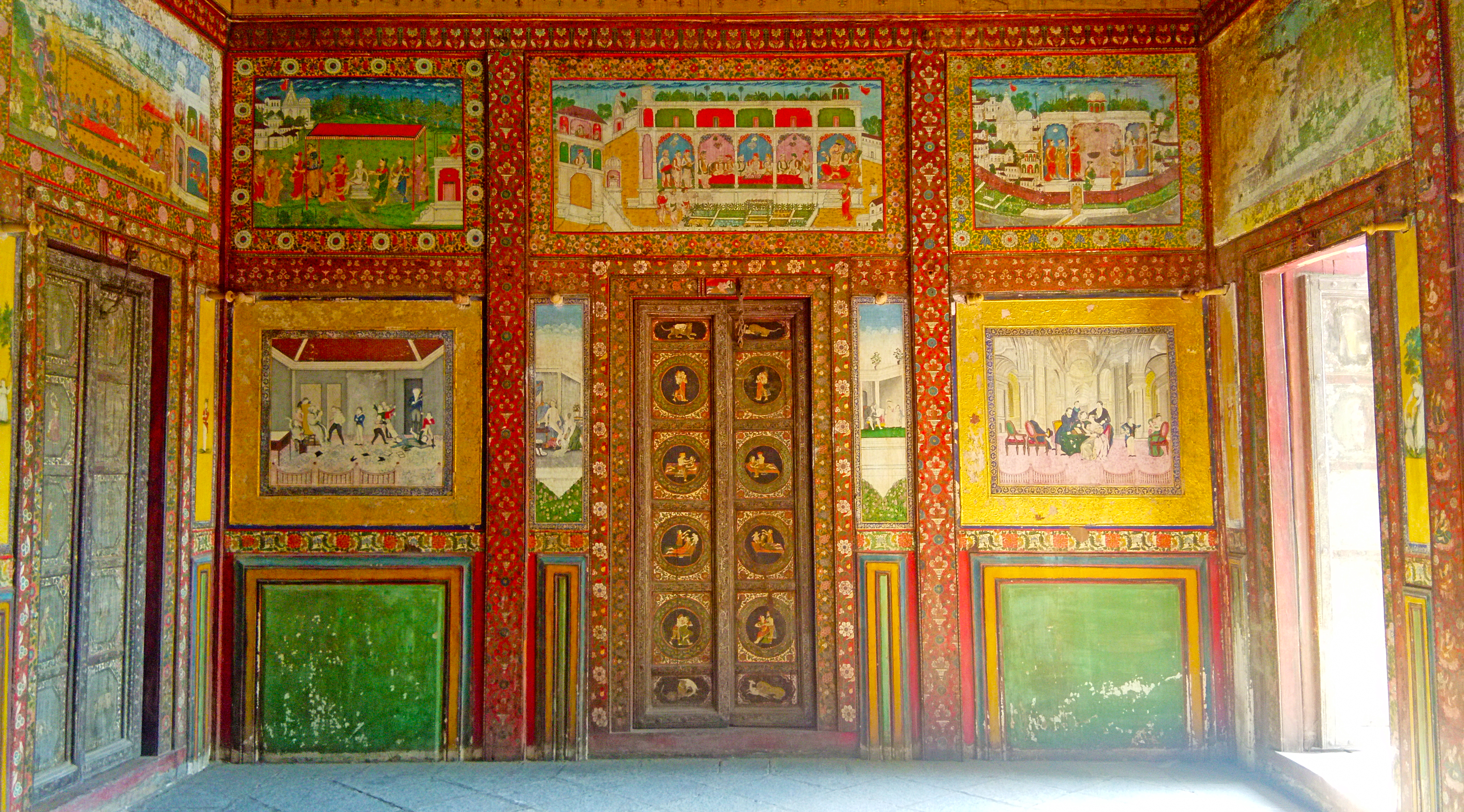
Fresco Rooms in Bhau Tambekar's Wada

=== Museums ===
Vadodara is home to notable museums like:

- Sayaji Baug, Baroda Museum and Picture Gallery
- Maharaja Fatehsinh Museum
- Museum Of Archeology And Ancient History
- Health Museum, Sayaji Baug

== Civic services ==
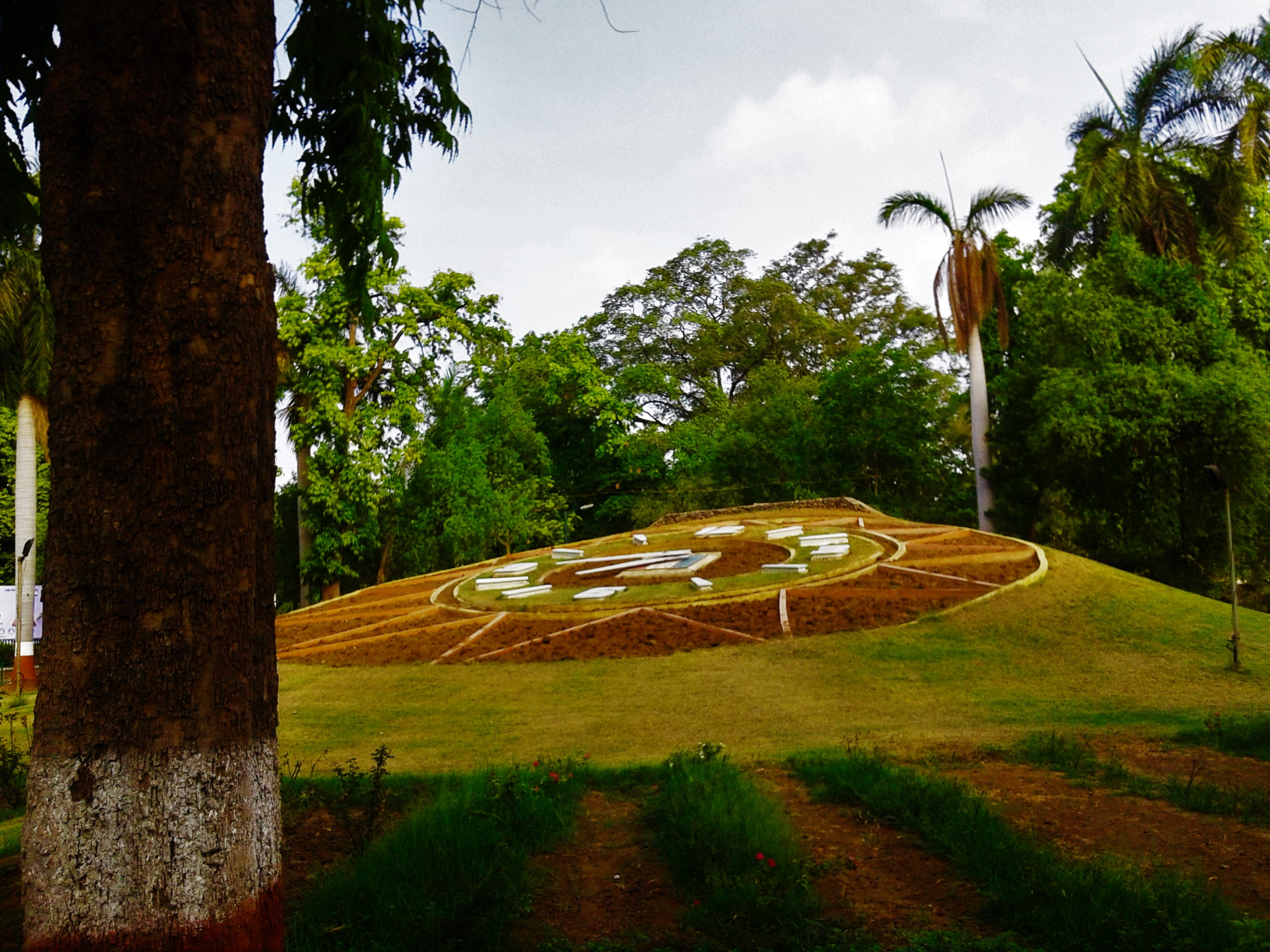
The Flora Clock at Sayaji Baug

Three civic service departments are under the municipal corporation - the engineering department, the health department, and the support or administration department.

These departments together provide services, infrastructure, and management for the entire city. The engineering department manages infrastructure and services provided through cells or subdepartments such as bridge cell, drainage project, town development, streetlight, electrical sewerage, mechanical sewerage, building project, solid-waste management, road, storm-water drainage, water work, land, and estate. The health department takes care of public health-related issues and services through its solid-waste management, health, and ICDS subdepartments. The health department also has a subdepartment for managing birth, death, and marriage registrations. The support department handles all IT and administration-related issues and services, with cells such as IT, accounts audit, census, PRO, election, real estate (acquisition), shops and establishment, assessment, and UCD-NULM departments.

=== Urban planning ===
The two main institutions involved in planning and development in Vadodara are VMSS and the Vadodara Urban Development Authority (VUDA). The responsibilities of both these agencies are demarcated clearly not only physically but also functionally. The governing acts for both institutions differ. The principal responsibility of VUDA is to ensure a holistic development of the Vadodara agglomeration covering an area of 714.56 km^{2} (275.89 sq mi), whereas VMSS is involved in the development of area of 235 km^{2} (91 sq mi).

Vadodara's population grew the fastest during the decade between 1961 and 1971. The Vadodara Municipal Corporation drew up the first official urban plan for the city's growth in 1970, the Vadodara Development Plan. The VUDA was formed in 1980. The second Development Plan, developed in 1984, included decentralising the city's infrastructure. During the mid-late 70s early 80s, development on the city's outskirts focused on building cheap, low-income housing for industrial workers. By the 1990s, the focus had shifted to mixed-density, "self-sustainable settlements" in peri-urban areas, especially on the west and southwest sides of town. Farmland was purchased from nearby villages to provide space for these new developments, which caused a large drop in cultivated acreage and overall agricultural produce in the area.

Initially, major industrial development happened on the city's north side; the east side also saw plenty of development because of its location near the old city core. The south and west were relatively less populated in comparison.

Various unplanned slum areas have been formed by rapid immigration from rural areas that outpaced formal city planning. These slum areas consist largely of temporary (kachcha) structures with communal toilets or none at all. They are often found in less-desired areas along river banks and nallahs or in other low-lying spots. Sanitation in these developments is generally poor.

A low of relatively lower-income, blue-collar workers live in industrial housing developments on Vadodara's outskirts. Economically Weaker Section (EWS) housing and slums are located especially on the northwest, northeast, and east sides of the city. In recent decades (as of 2021), major industrial development has taken place along the NH-8 corridor. Religious institutions like temples and ashrams have especially developed on the east side of town, while the Transport Nagar development is located on the northeast.

=== Solid waste management ===
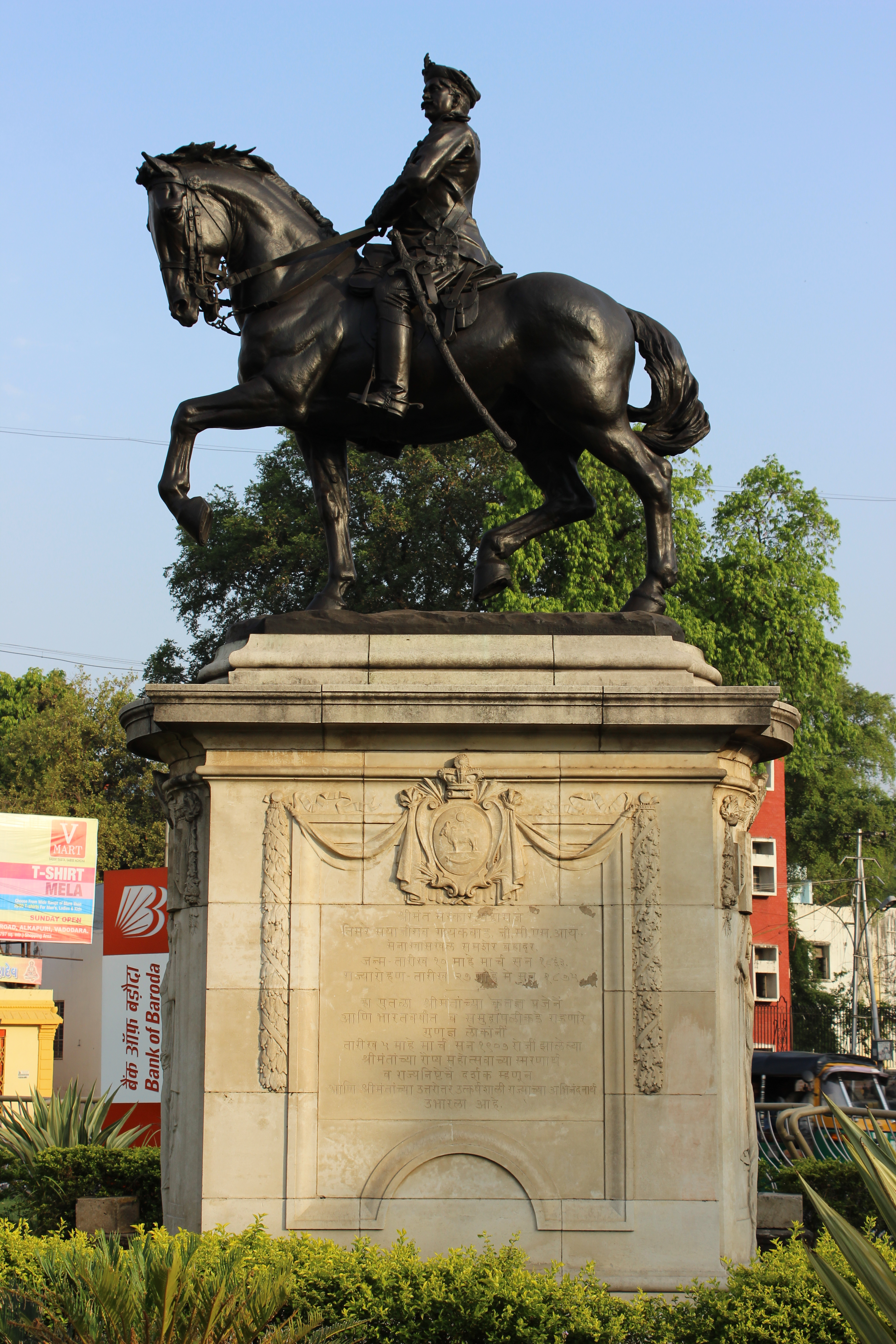
Kalaghoda circle

The municipal corporation under its health department provides the solid waste management for the Vadodara city. All zonal asst. municipal commissioners, zonal health officers, ward officers, sanitary inspectors are part of the solid waste management committee who need to be present during the weekly SWM coordination meetings. The department takes care of the sweeping, cleaning and maintenance along with complaint redressal. All zonal chief, assistant municipal commissioners, zonal health officers and other sanitary staff are expected to work on field between 7am to 11am on weekdays. The solid waste management also has a litter prevention system which carries out litter patrol and charges fines as administrative fees from the defaulters.

=== Water supply ===
An average of 53.2 million gallon (240 million litres) of water per day, or 38 gallon (190 litres) per person per day is provided the city daily to meets its daily water requirement. The water supply is provided by the water works department of the municipal corporation along with other agencies like the Sardar Sarovar Narmada limited who directly supply water to VMC which is looked after the Gujarat Pollution Control Board, the Gujarat Water Supply and Sewerage Board, and the Water and Sanitation Management Organization. The city receives its drinking water supply from 16 high rise water tanks and one busting station located within the city.

The Sardar Sarovar Dam which is one of the drinking water sources for the city, had halted supply temporarily in 2019 after receiving complains about the high sulphur content from the Narmada river, but the water supply was restarted again after a few days. The other sources of water are the Mahi River for which the water is obtained from a French well that has naturally purified water through layers of sand. The Ajwa Sarovar is another source of drinking water and is filtered at Nimeta Water Purification Plant.

In January 2019, VUDA and GWSSB joined hands to reduce the acute shortage of drinking water for residential societies near close to the Vadodara city. A quantity of 3 MLD water per day for three years will be provided as a temporary measure until water from the Timbi pond and Narmada canal reaches these residences.

=== Drainage and sewage ===
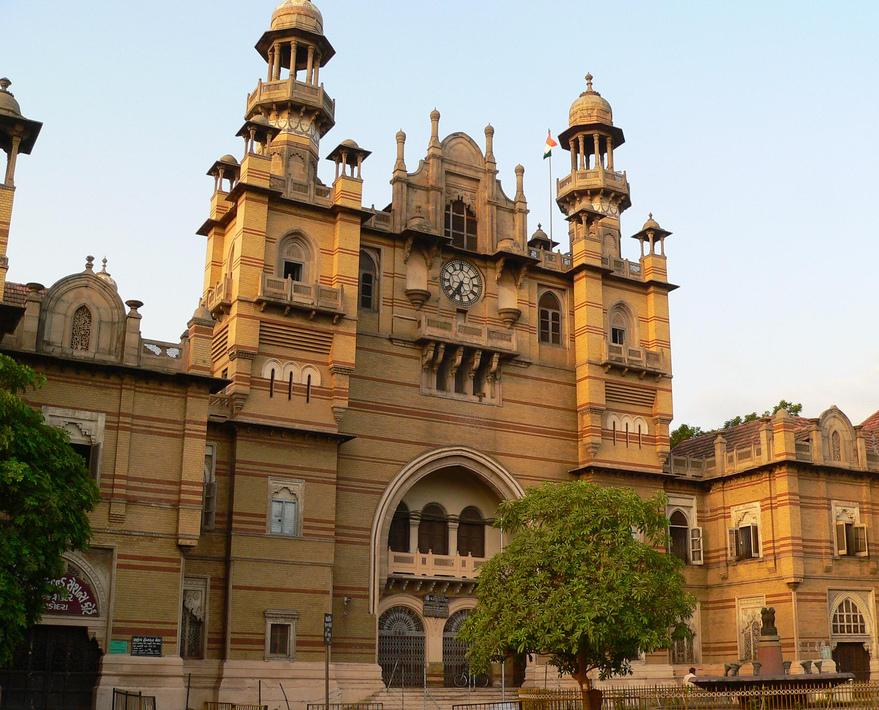
Nyay Mandir, Vadodara High Court

The drainage is provided under the Engineering department's drainage projects or the Public Health Engineering Laboratory (PHEL). The department provides planning, designing, estimating, tendering, executing and operating and maintaining the sewerage systems like the sewerage network, sewage pumping stations, sewage pumping mains, sewage treatment and effluent disposal works.

The sewage as of 2001 covered 55% area and 65% of the present population when the VMC limits extended to 108.00 km^{2} (41.70 sq mi). The Public Health Engineering Laboratory (PHEL) has been working on a comprehensive sewerage system Master Plan for 1,425 km^{2} (550 sq mi) of sewers and nine sewage treatment works. The plan master plan is designed for the year 2021 where the project aims to increase the sewage coverage from 55% to 95% by area and 65% to 93% by population for an area of 159.31 km^{2} (61.51 sq mi).

=== Electricity ===
Madhya Gujarat Vij Company Limited (MGVCL) is the main electricity provision company for the Gujarat state and Vadodara. Hydroelectricity is additionally being generated by water from Sardar Sarovar Dam with six units of river bed power houses of 200 megawatt each.

=== Fire and emergency ===
Fire and rescue operations are provided by the VMC under its fire department which is provided according to the Section 285 to 289 of the BPMC Act. VMC has fixed rates for rescue operations & fire extinguishing within the VMC limits and outside it. The VMC's fire department also provide additional services like water tanker provision for domestic, religious or marriage purposes, providing ambulance, dead body carrier.

== Transport ==
The city is on the major rail and road arteries joining Mumbai with Delhi and Mumbai with Ahmedabad.

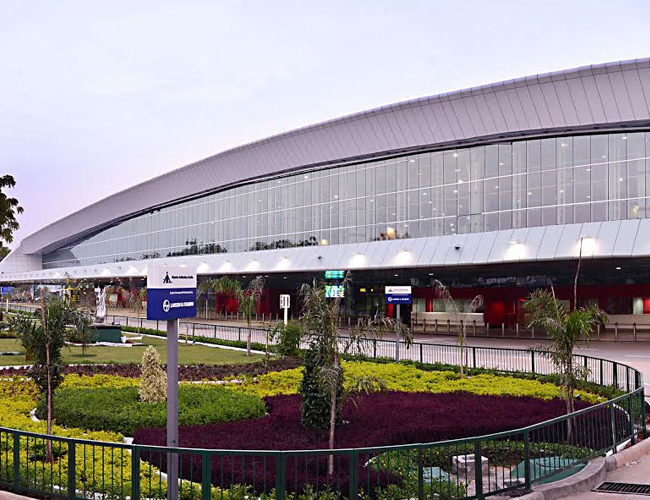
Vadodara Airport

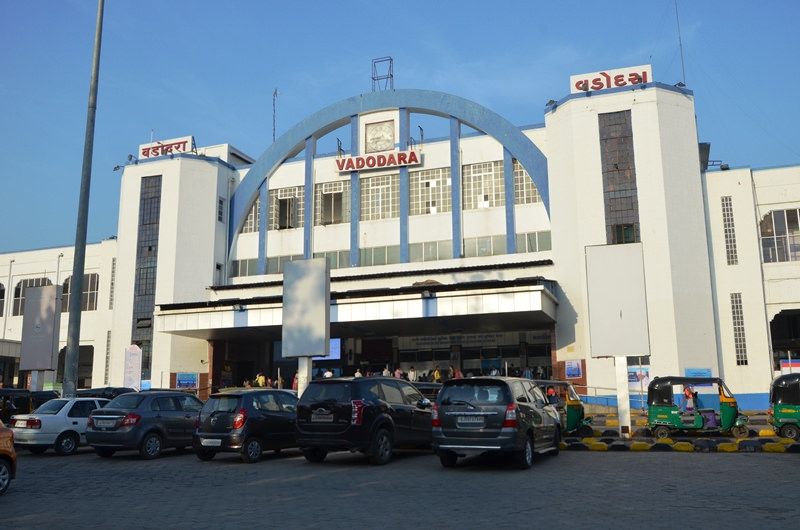
Vadodara Junction Railway Station

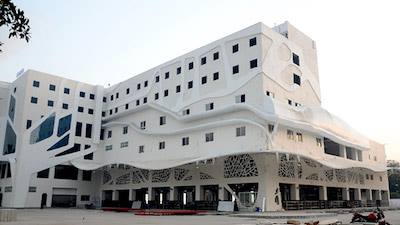
Bus Terminus in Vadodara

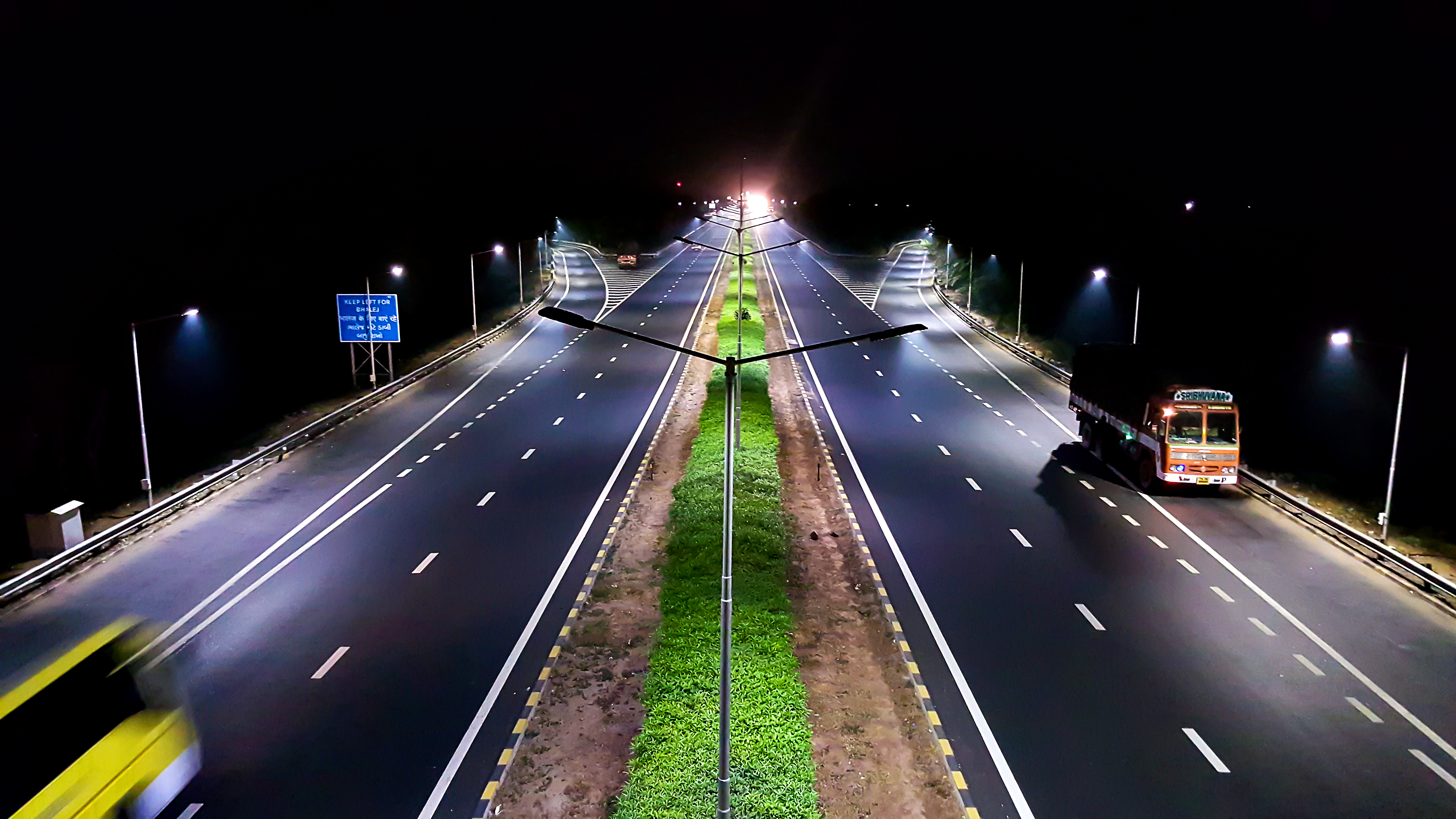
Ahmedabad-Vadodara Expressway

=== Air ===
Vadodara Airport (IATA: BDQ) is located north-east of the city. Vadodara has flight connections with Mumbai, New Delhi, Hyderabad, Bangalore, Pune and Goa. Air India and IndiGo are currently operating their services from the airport. A new integrated international terminal has been constructed at the Vadodara airport and was inaugurated in October 2016. Vadodara is the first Green Airport in Gujarat and Second Green Airport in India after Kochi.

=== Railway ===
Vadodara was part of the historic Bombay, Baroda and Central India Railway (BBCI), which arrived in the city in January 1861. On 5 November 1951 the BBCI Railway was merged with the Saurashtra, Rajputana and Jaipur railways to create the Western Railway. Vadodara Railway Station now belongs to the Western Railway zone of Indian Railways and is a major junction on the Western Railway Main Line.

The under-construction Mumbai–Ahmedabad high-speed rail corridor, India's first High-speed rail line will have a stop at the existing Vadodara Junction railway station. The station is planned for renovation to accommodate the new line.

=== Bus ===
Vadodara bus station is also beautifully designed as a symbol of Banyan (Vad) trees and located near by Railway Station. It also has a market, food court and multiplex facilities.

=== Road ===
Vadodara has taxi services that is operational mostly around Vadodara Railway station and the Vadodara Airport, apart from this Vadodara has private cab services like Ola, Uber, etc. Vadodara also has self drive car rental services operated by private companies like Just Drive Self Drive Cars.

== Sports ==
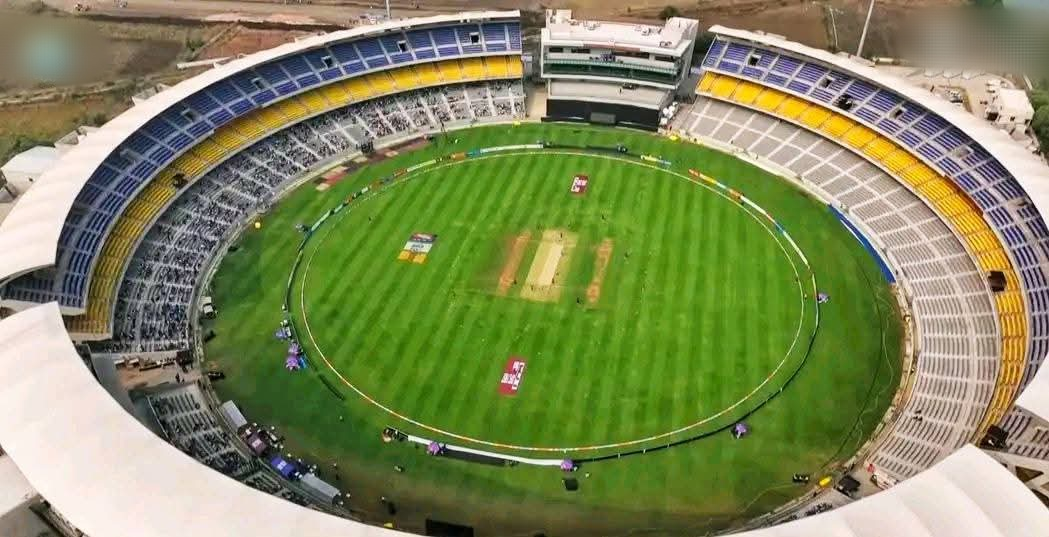
Baroda Cricket Association Stadium

Vadodara has a professional cricket team, the Baroda cricket team, as well as a cricket stadium called Moti Baug. The team has won the Ranji Trophy six times. Reliance Stadium, a private cricket ground owned by Reliance Industries, hosts ODIs. Some of the notable cricketer's from Baroda are Vijay Hazare, Anshuman Gaekwad, Kiran More, Nayan Mongia, Atul Bedade, Irfan Pathan, Yusuf Pathan, Hardik Pandya, Krunal Pandya, Deepak Hooda.

The Baroda Cricket Association Stadium (BCA Stadium), also known as the Vadodara International Cricket Stadium or Kotambi Stadium, opened in December 2024 through an organized Women's ODI series between India and West Indies women's teams. The stadium is the home ground for the Baroda Cricket Association in the domestic circle.

Vadodara would also have a sports university in Desar.

== Media ==
The city has five local FM stations: Radio City (91.1 MHz), Radio Mirchi (98.3 MHz), Red FM (93.5 MHz), Big FM (92.7 MHz), and All India Radio, Vividh Bharti (93.9 MHz)(Aakashwani). Radio City (91.1 MHz) is known all over Vadodara for its Rag Rag Ma Vadodara City profile. All India Radio is broadcast on the AM band. Satellite radio was launched in nearby city of Ahmedabad by WorldSpace in 2005. Vadodara News Magazine(VNM) is a local news TV channel that covers events in the city. Sandesh News is a local news TV channel.

== Education ==
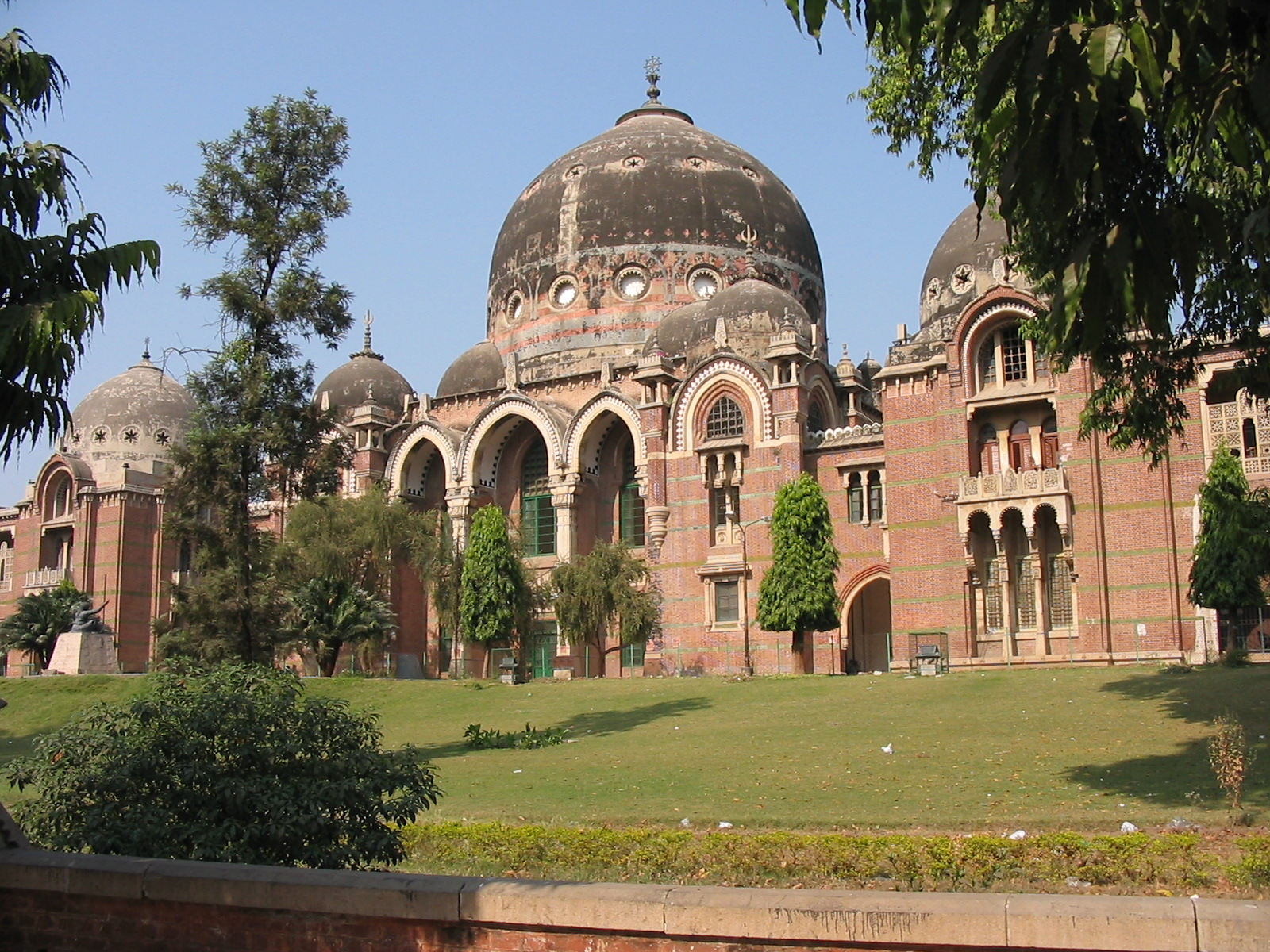
The Maharaja Sayajirao University of Baroda

The city houses many Schools and Colleges, including Baroda High School. Higher Education Institutions across various disciplines attract international students mainly from the African countries such as Ethiopia, Zimbabwe, Malawi, South Africa, and Kenya.

In 1909 there were plans to open a school for the deaf.

=== Universities ===
- The Maharaja Sayajirao University of Baroda
- Central University of Gujarat
- Parul University
- Navrachana University
- Gati Shakti Vishwavidyalaya (formerly National Rail and Transportation Institute)
- Sumandeep Vidyapeeth
- ITM Vocational University
- ITM SLS University
- Sigma University
