= Surat Thermal Power Station =

GIPCL Surat Thermal Power Station
- Country: India
- Location: Surat, Gujarat
- Coordinates: 21°23′48.6″N 73°06′30.0″E
- Status: Operational
- Owner: Gujarat Industries Power Company Ltd.

Thermal power station
- Primary fuel: Lignite coal

Power generation
- Units operational: 4 X 125 MW
- Nameplate capacity: 500 MW

Surat Thermal Power Station is lignite-based thermal power plant. It is located at Nani Naroli village in Surat, Gujarat. The power plant is run by state owned Gujarat Industrial Power Corporation Limited (GIPCL).

== Capacity ==
The installed capacity of the power plant is 500 MW (4x125 MW).

Stage	Unit Number	Installed Capacity (MW)	Date of Commissioning	Status
1	1	125	1999 November	Running
1	2	125	1999 November	Running
2	3	125	2010 April	Running
2	4	125	2010 April	Running
