= ITM University, Raipur =

State private university in Raipur, India

Coordinates: 21.112°N 81.754°E

Institute of Technology And Management, Raipur
- Type: State Private University
- Established: 2012
- Affiliations: UGC, AIU, BCI
- Chancellor: P. V. Ramana
- Vice-Chancellor: Dr. Sumer Singh
- Location: Raipur, Chhattisgarh, India
- Campus: 23 acres (9.3 ha)
- Website: www.itmuniversity.org

Institute of Technology and Management, Raipur (ITM University), is a state private university located in Raipur, Chhattisgarh, established under Section 9 (2) of the Chhattisgarh Private Universities (Establishment and Operations Amendment) Act 2011 by the private organization ITM Society Raipur. As part of the larger ITM Group of Institutions, the university was created to provide more higher-education opportunities in central India, offering programs in engineering, management, life sciences, humanities, and other professional areas.

== Infrastructure ==
The university’s campus covers about 23 acres and includes two main academic buildings. These buildings house the Vice Chancellor’s office, 40 classrooms, 12 laboratories, two computer labs, and a central library. The campus also has open sports areas and basic facilities to support teaching, research, and student life. According to official information, the university emphasizes modern labs, digital classrooms, and industry-focused programs to help students gain practical skills and prepare for their careers.

== Student Feedback ==
Independent student reviews of ITM University Raipur say the university has good infrastructure and helpful teachers across many departments, though experiences vary by program. Some students mention the well-kept labs and friendly staff, while others note issues such as transportation and fewer extracurricular facilities. Placement results are mixed, with some students getting high salary offers, but most see average outcomes similar to other private universities nearby.

Feedback on placements and internships suggests that outcomes are moderate. Some students do get good offers or internships, but overall results seem similar to what other private universities in the region achieve. Chances of getting placed appear to depend on the specific department, a student’s grades, and the current job market in different industries.
