= Institute for Information, Telecommunication and Media Law =

German research organisation

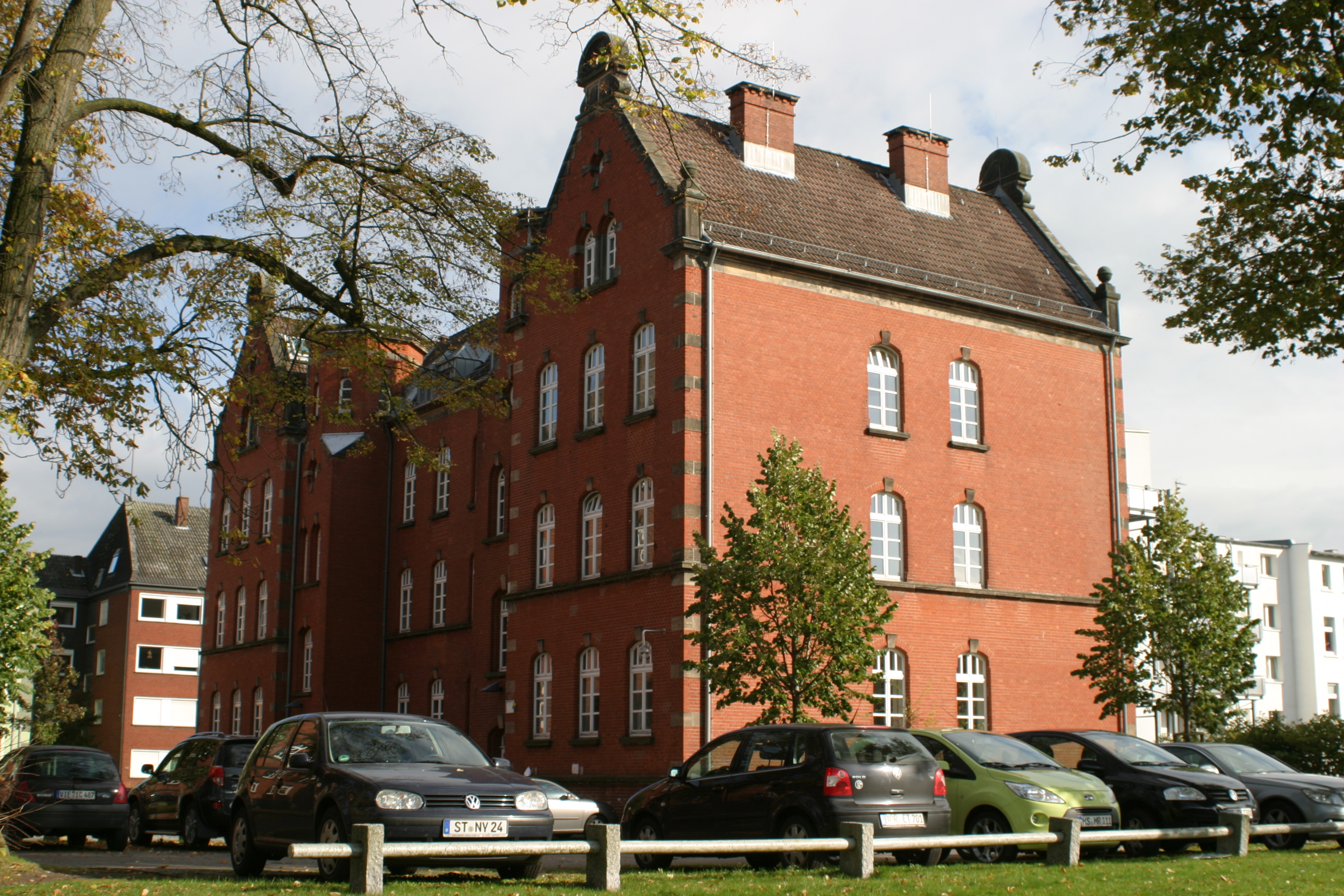
- Established: 1997
- President: Prof. Dr. Thomas Hoeren
- Staff: 40
- Address: Leonardo-Campus 9, 48149 Münster, Germany
- Location: Münster, North Rhine-Westphalia, Germany
- Coordinates: 51°58′29.28″N 7°36′13.68″E
- Website: ITM Web-site

The Institute for Information, Telecommunication and Media Law or ITM (German: Institut für Informations-, Telekommunikations- und Medienrecht) is a research and educational organisation located in Münster, North Rhine-Westphalia, Germany. All major research projects conducted by ITM are ordered by the European Commission. The institute's scientific council is made up of Prof. Dr. Gunnar Bender, Wilhelm Berneke, Jon Bing, Santiago Cavanillas, Herbert Fiedler, Heinz Lothar Grob, Fritjof Haft, Bernt Hugenholtz, Hans Jarass, Wolfgang Kilian, Miriam Meckel, Ernst-Joachim Mestmäcker, Ursula Nelles and other prominent scientists.

== Research objective ==
ITM logo

The Institute for Information, Telecommunication and Media Law (ITM) aims to explore the legal framework conditions of information society. To learn from the experiences of other countries, comparative law is granted a special position. Furthermore, the institute's tasks consist of the representation of information, telecommunication and media law in academics and further training. Its members focus on possible applications for interactive media in academic teaching and further legal information topics.

Information, telecommunication and media law is a multidisciplinary matter which cannot even approximately be covered by any of the traditional legal disciplines – civil, criminal and public law. The ITM therefore strives for interdisciplinary research and teaching activities. For that reason the board of directors contains professors for civil law, criminal law and public law. This institutional structure is the only of its kind in Germany.

== Area of researches ==
=== Information law ===
Information law deals with legal problems arising from electronic data processing (EDP). Whereas formerly goods and services were the main focus, today intangible assets like know-how, data collections, experience and ideas have gained increasing economic importance. Information society is a term used to describe the modern world, where images, texts and sounds are linked digitally. Despite the significance data has gained in society, its legal classification is still open. Most notably in terms of civil law, there are great difficulties in determining who certain data belongs to as well as in defining the individual rights involved in that ownership. These issues constitute the primary concern of the department's research activities.

=== Telecommunication law ===
Research is especially required in the following fields:

- The right of way in terms of para. 50 and 57 TKG (German Telecommunications Act)
- Telecommunications business and consumer protection
- Competition and anti-trust law

=== Media law ===
Media law comprises film and music law, more precisely legal issues regarding the creation and utilisation of films and music. Particular emphasis is put on copyright aspects and legal problems in film and music distribution.

=== Informatics in the legal profession ===
This area deals with changes in the legal professions (e.g. judges, lawyers in the private sector and those in public administration) due to the use of electronic data processing.

== Scientific activities ==
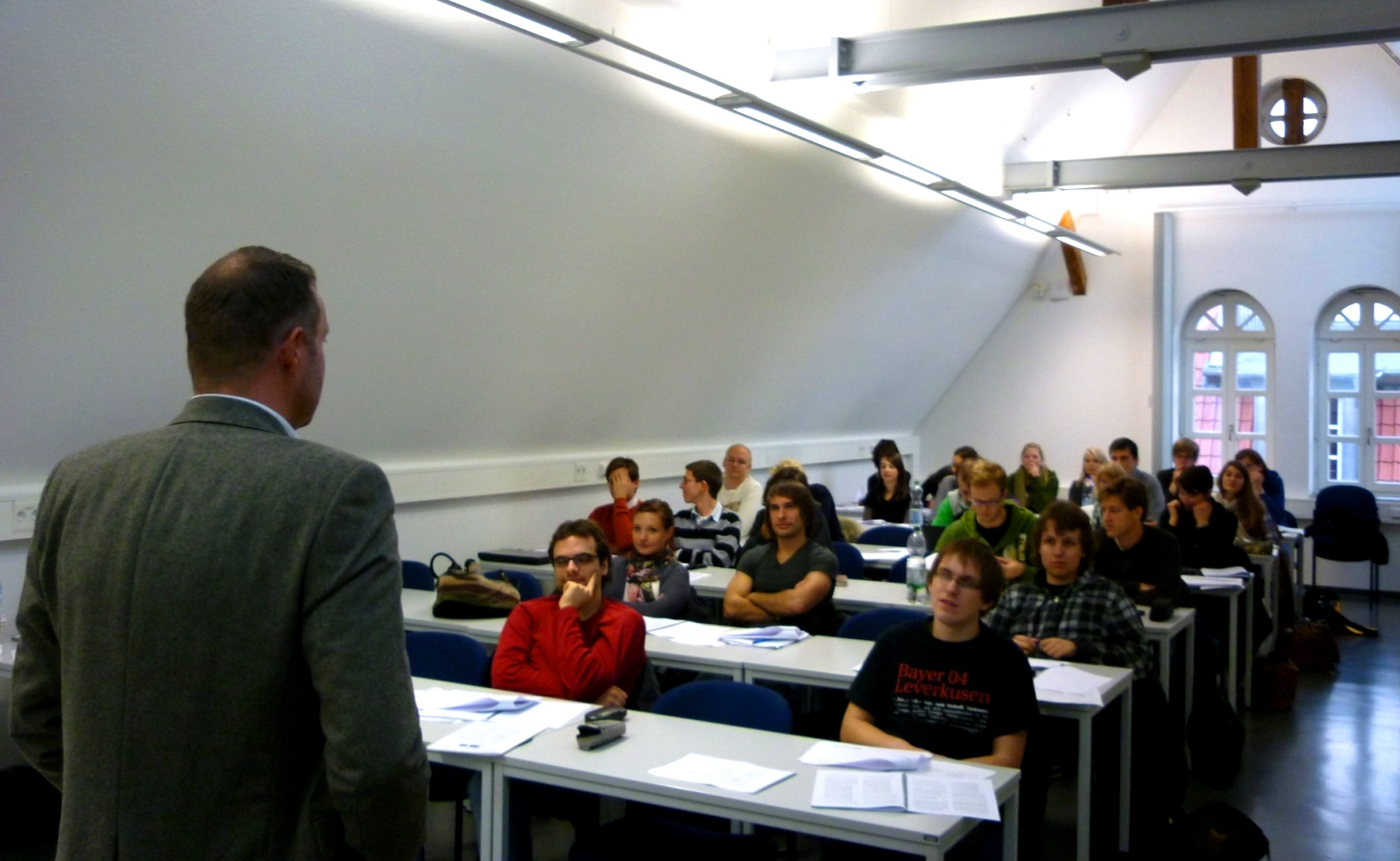
A lecture on the legal matters of data protection held at the ITM

=== Current research projects ===
- CONSENT (Consumer sentiment regarding privacy on user generated content services in the digital economy) is a medium-scale research project promoted by the Commission of the European Union. 19 partners from 13 European countries, including interdisciplinary institutes, research centres, universities and NGOs, are participating in this project. CONSENT aims to examine consumer sentiment regarding privacy on user-generated content (UGC) services such as YouTube, Facebook and MySpace in the digital economy. This project seeks to examine how consumer behaviour and commercial practices are changing the role of consent in the processing of personal data and whether recent changes to consumer and commercial practices lead to consumers (in)voluntarily signing away their fundamental right to privacy. CONSENT's multidisciplinary team intends to carry out a status quo analysis of commercial practices, legal positions and consumer attitudes, identifying criteria for fairness and best practices, and then create a toolkit for policy-makers and corporate counsel which will enable them to address problems identified in the analysis. CONSENT began in May 2010 and ended in April 2012.
- LAPSI (Legal Aspects of Public Sector Information) is a research project promoted by the European Commission and deals with the legal problems regarding public sector information. 20 partners from 13 European countries are participating in this project. The main aim is to identify and discuss legal barriers to access and re-use of public sector information in the digital environment and suggest ways to overcome them. Additionally, the LAPSI project intends to build a network apt to become the main European point of reference for high-level policy discussions and strategic action on all legal issues related to the access to and the re-use of public sector information in the digital environment. The LAPSI project will have a duration of 30 months.
- E-Learning: The competence centre for e-learning is part of the European Research Center for Information Systems (ERCIS) of the University of Münster. It is funded by the Federal Ministry for Education and Research with a focus on new media and education. The aim of this project is the development of a technology-driven model for organizing the promotion and integration of e-learning projects at universities. The Civil Law Department is in charge of the legal aspects of e-learning issue. The ITM's focus is mainly on problems regarding data protection and copyright in the field of teaching at universities.
- History of information law: The project is sponsored by the German Research Foundation (DFG) and constitutes a scientific attempt to reveal the origin and evolution of the field of law known as information law. From the very beginning of the use of electronic data processing by the public administration and the business community, many legal problems have emerged and have had to be solved. The question to be answered is whether information law is simply a generic term describing a loose selection of topics dealing with the legal review of problems concerning information, or if there is a common theoretical foundation to constitute a legal discipline of its own. Analysis is concentrated on the development of privacy protection, freedom of information, legal informatics and IT law. Besides the review of significant publications and court decisions, the project also involves interviewing prominent jurists who worked in the field of information law early on.
- Law & ICT Shared Virtual Campus: The ITM is a member of the Law & ICT Shared Virtual Campus, a project of the LEFIS networks. The project aims to offer online courses towards different degrees. The project is led by Fernando Galindo of the University of Zaragoza.
- Matters of Law in the German Research Network (DFN): The German Research Network (DFN) supports communication and the exchange of information or data between representatives of science, research, education and culture in national and international networks. In this context, the DFN also operates as an online provider. With reference to legal questions of liability, telecommunications and data protection, DFN members are faced with increasing problems. As recent dispensation on liability of providers and the new German multimedia acts could not resolve the legal uncertainty in this area, practical and efficient assistance is required. Therefore, the ITM functions as a legal consultant in terms of information and communication services.
- Research Centre for Industrial Property Rights: Industrial property rights play a significant role in many economic sectors. An effective legal protection of inventions and technical advances is an unalterable condition for a working political economy. A business owner would quickly lose their advantage if industrial property rights did not exist. Many law graduates are faced with an increasing demand for skills in the field, though hardly any curriculum covers this branch of law. Since its establishment in 1998, the Research Centre for Industrial Property Rights has aimed to supply this need by offering additional training besides its research activities in this sector.

=== Completed research projects ===
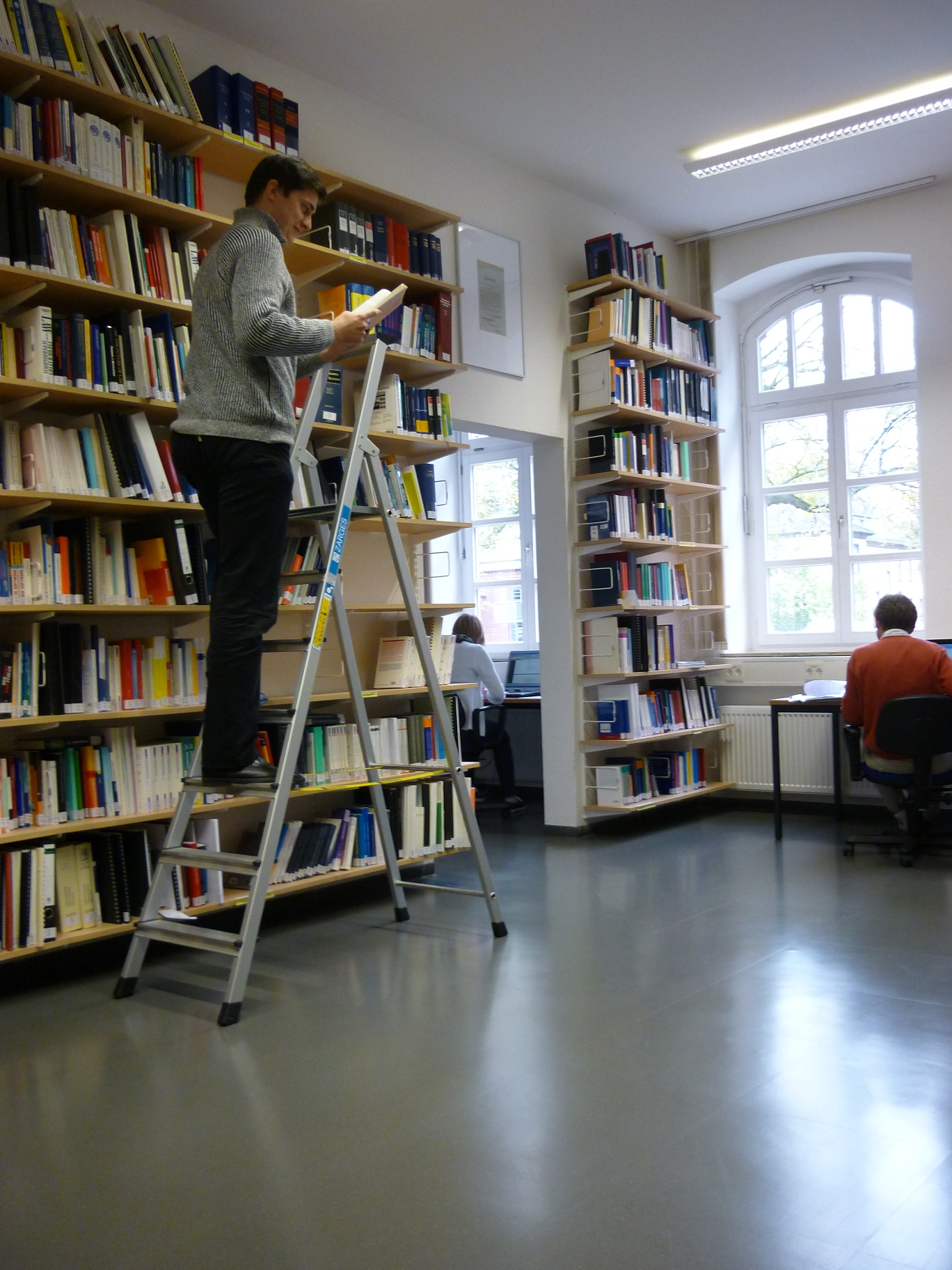
ITM Library

- ECLIP (Electronic Commerce Legal Issues Platform): The ITM was coordinating partner of this major research project initiated by the Commission of the EU. In cooperation with four other research institutes in Belgium, Great Britain, Norway and Spain, questions of law with reference to e-commerce were investigated from 1998 to 2000. The ITM's contribution focussed on legal aspects of copyright and taxation. Besides their extensive cross-border research activities, the ECLIP partners assisted other EU projects with legal advice on technical or economic matters of e-commerce. Furthermore, ECLIP aimed at enriching the scientific debate and raising general consciousness concerning legal issues of e-commerce. For this reason, the project partners organised specific workshops, participated in international conferences and published many works on this topic.
- Interactive Media (PISA): This project was founded by the federal state of North Rhine-Westphalia and aimed at the creation of an interactive teaching system on immovable property law (PISA stands for a practical approach to immovable property law). Students are enabled to deepen and practice their knowledge through the use of personal computers. Within the scope of these do-it-yourself studies, the students themselves control the time, place and speed of the learning process. The concept of the programme is based on new findings in educational psychology. Another objective was the development of general standards for a legal learning software program (EuLe) which could be used in education.
- MOF project (Moderated online case study on business economics and private law): The MOF project aimed at the development of a modular system for the moderation of interactive case studies on the internet. Then the system was applied to case studies in particular disciplines and also on an interdisciplinary level.
- ZAP Project: The project dealt with electronic presentation of legal information. As a main target, even jurists who have only limited knowledge of EDP should be enabled to find the relevant information without great difficulty. New technologies like the internet and the possibilities of e-commerce were in the forefront of the project.
- IPR-HD (The IPR Helpdesk) is a European network consisting of several research institutes, law firms and consultancies. The project is promoted by the Commission of the EU and aims at supporting the use and commercialization of intellectual property rights by SMEs (small and medium-sized entities) and research institutes, particularly on a European level. The work includes, for example, assistance in finding advisory boards for registration, protection and utilization of copyrights, patents and trademarks. The IPR-HD uses various tools including websites, newsletters, CD-ROMs, a helpline, seminars and workshops. The project is headed by the University of Alicante (Spain) and the Global Europe Consulting Group (Brussels). The ITM serves as a content provider for the German-speaking region. Further partners in the field of science are the Centre de recherches informatique et droit in Namur, Belgium, the Institute of Commercial Protection of Law at the University of Alicante and the Centre for Commercial Law Studies in London.
- RESPECT is another project initiated by the Commission of the EU. Within the scope of the Information Society Technologies (IST) programme, RESPECT is an interdisciplinary cooperation of several institutes in Great Britain, Belgium, Hungary, Austria and Germany. The project aims to draw up a set of professional and ethical rules for socio-economic research within the EU. As the German partner, the ITM is developing guidelines for the use of intellectual property in compliance with copyright provisions of the member states. For this, great emphasis is put on recent EU copyright directives and changes in national laws.
