= Nandesari =

Coordinates: 22°24′59″N 73°05′13″E

Nandesari Nandesari GIDC
- town
- Nickname: Nandesari GIDC
- Interactive map of Nandesari
- Country: India
- State: Gujarat
- District: Vadodara

Population (2001)
  - Total: 7,259

Languages
  - Official: Gujarati, Hindi
- Time zone: UTC+5:30 (IST)
- PIN: 391340
- Vehicle registration: GJ
- Website: gujaratindia.com

Nandesari is a census town in Vadodara district in the Indian state of Gujarat.

== Demographics ==
As of 2001 India census, Nandesari had a population of 7259. Males constitute 53% of the population and females 47%. Nandesari has an average literacy rate of 72%, higher than the national average of 59.5%: male literacy is 80%, and female literacy is 62%. In Nandesari, 13% of the population is under 6 years of age.

Nandesari has a large notified industrial area consisting of large amount of chemical factories. It homes gujarats first GIDC with concrete roads and storm water drains.
