= ITM Vocational University =

University in Waghodia, Gujarat, India

- Type: Private
- Established: 2014
- Affiliations: UGC
- Chairperson: Dr. P. V. Ramana
- Provost: Dr. Anil M. Bisen
- Location: Waghodia, Gujarat, India; 22°20′24″N 73°21′41″E
- Website: www.itm.ac.in
- Location within Gujarat Location within India

ITM Vocational University is a private university located in Waghodia, Vadodara district, Gujarat, India. The university was established in 2014 by the ITM Group of Institutions through The Gujarat Private Universities (Amendment) Act, 2014.
