= NorthCap University =

Private university in Haryana, India

The NorthCap University
- Former name: ITM University
- Motto: Tradition Transformation Innovation
- Type: Private
- Established: 1996; 30 years ago
- Affiliations: UGC, BCI
- Chancellor: Avdhesh Mishra
- Vice-Chancellor: Nupur Prakash
- Location: Gurugram, Haryana, India; 28.504299°N 77.04904°E
- Campus: Partially residential
- Nickname: NCU
- Website: www.ncuindia.edu

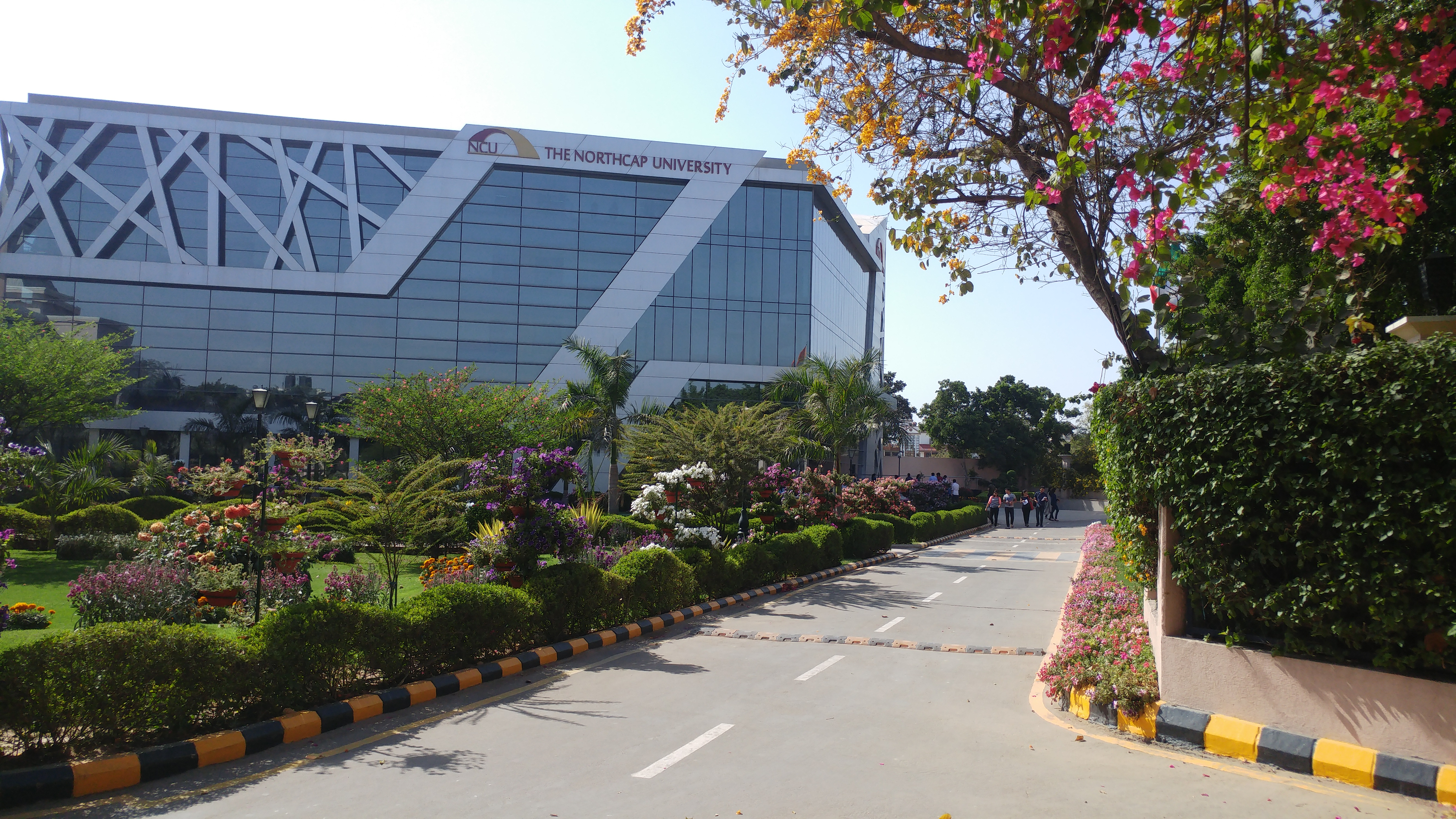
The NorthCap University

The NorthCap University (abbreviated as NCU; formerly ITM University) is an Indian private university situated in Sector 23-A, Gurgaon, Haryana. Formerly it was under Maharshi Dayanand University, Rohtak.

The Institute gained the status of private university in the Academic Year 2009–10, and was renamed ITM University.(*needs verification*)

== Campus ==
The university is located in Sector 23-A, Gurgaon, Haryana, which is about 15 km from Indira Gandhi International Airport. The university's campus is spread over 10 acres with a covered area of over 32,000 square metres.

== Schools ==
The university has four schools offering degrees at the undergraduate, postgraduate and doctoral level, namely the School of Engineering & Technology, School of Management and Liberal Studies, School of Law and School of Business.

- School of Engineering and Technology
  - Department of Applied Sciences
  - Department of Multidisciplinary Engineering
  - Department of Computer Science and Engineering
  - Centre of Media and Entertainment
- School of Management and Liberal Studies
  - Department of Psychology
  - Centre for Language Learning
  - Department of Management and Commerce
- School of Law
- School of Business

== Rankings ==
University and college rankings

Engineering – India
- NIRF (2024): 101-150

The National Institutional Ranking Framework (NIRF) ranked it in the 101-150 band among engineering colleges in 2024.

== See also ==
- State University of Performing And Visual Arts
- State Institute of Film and Television
