= Amod, Gujarat =

Amod
- town
- Location in Gujarat, India Amod (India)
- Coordinates: 22.00°N 72.87°E
- Country: India
- State: Gujarat
- District: Bharuch

Languages
  - Official: Gujarati, Hindi
- Time zone: UTC+5:30 (IST)
- Vehicle registration: GJ
- Website: gujaratindia.com

Amod is a town and capital of a taluka in Bharuch district, Gujarat, India. It is situated about a mile south of the Dhadhar River. on the NH 228 road (the "Dandi heritage route") between Bharuch and Jambusar.

Maharaja Naharsinhji

== Economy ==
Amod was the seat of a Thakur who owned about

21,200 acres (86 km^{2}) of land at the start of the 20th century. The income of the estate was about ₨72,000, compared with the income of Amod municipality (established 1890) of ₨6,100.

== See also ==
- Sigam
