= Samni Junction railway station =

Railway Station in Gujarat, India

Samni Junction
- Indian Railway Stations logo

General information
- Location: Bharuch–Jambusar Road, Vachhnad, Gujarat; India
- Coordinates: 21°51′10″N 72°55′28″E
- Elevation: 16 metres (52 ft)
- System: Indian Railways station
- Owner: Indian Railways
- Operator: Western Railway
- Line: Bharuch–Dahej line
- Platforms: 2
- Tracks: 3

Construction
- Structure type: Standard (on-ground station)
- Parking: No
- Cycle facilities: No

Other information
- Status: Functioning
- Station code: SAMN
- Zone(s): Western Railway
- Division(s): Vadodara
Location
- Location within India Location within Gujarat

Samni Junction railway station is a small railway station in Bharuch district, Gujarat. Its code is SAMN. It serves Vora Samni village. The station consists of two platforms, neither well sheltered. It lacks many facilities including water and sanitation.

== Trains ==
- 69195/96 Bharuch–Dahej MEMU
