= Bharuch Assembly constituency =

Legislative Assembly constituency in Gujarat State, India

Coordinates: 21.73°N 73°E

Bharuch
- Constituency No. 153 for the Gujarat Legislative Assembly

Constituency details
- Country: India
- Region: Western India
- State: Gujarat
- District: Bharuch
- Lok Sabha constituency: Bharuch
- Established: 1951
- Total electors: 293,510
- Reservation: None

Member of Legislative Assembly
- 15th Gujarat Legislative Assembly
- Incumbent Rameshbhai Narandas Mistry
- Party: Bharatiya Janata Party
- Elected year: 2022

Bharuch is one of the 182 Legislative Assembly constituencies of Gujarat state in India. It is part of Bharuch district.

== List of segments ==
This assembly seat represents the following segments since the 2008 delimitation,

1. Bharuch Taluka (Part) Villages – Kanthariya, Sherpura, Umraj, Chavaj, Vadadla, Haldarwa, Jhadeshwar, Bholav, Nandelav, Rahadpor, Borbhatha Bet, Bharuch INA, Bharuch (M), Maktampur (CT)
2. Ankleshwar Taluka (Part) Villages – Chhapra, Kansiya, Mandvabuzarg, Naugama, Samor, Motali, Amrutpura, Uchhali, Kararvel, Dadhal, Sarangpore, Jitali, Piprod, Avadar, Pardi Mokha, Sangpor, Andada (CT)

== Members of Legislative Assembly ==
Year	Member	Party
1995	Bipinbhai Shah	Bharatiya Janata Party
1998	Bipinbhai Shah	Bharatiya Janata Party
2002	Ramesh Mistry	Bharatiya Janata Party
2007	Dushyantbhai Rajneekant Patel	Bharatiya Janata Party
2012	Dushyantbhai Rajneekant Patel	Bharatiya Janata Party
2017	Dushyantbhai Rajneekant Patel	Bharatiya Janata Party
2022	Ramesh Mistry	Bharatiya Janata Party

== Election results ==
=== 2022 ===
2022 Gujarat Legislative Assembly election
Party	Candidate	Votes	%	±%
BJP	Ramesh Mistry	108,655	63.24	+5.41
INC	Jaykant Patel	44,182	25.71	−12.92
AAP	Manharbhai Parmar	14,514	8.45	New
Majority		64,473	37.53	
Turnout		171819		
BJP hold		Swing		

=== 2017 ===
2017 Gujarat Legislative Assembly election: Bharuch
Party	Candidate	Votes	%	±%
BJP	Dushyantbhai Patel	99,699	57.83	
INC	Jayeshbhai Patel	66,600	38.63	
Majority			19.2	
Turnout		1,72,396	67.52	
BJP hold		Swing		

=== 2012 ===
2012 Gujarat Legislative Assembly election
Party	Candidate	Votes	%	±%
BJP	Dushyantbhai Patel	92,219	59.35	
INC	Sandip Mangrola	55029	35.42	
Majority		37190	23.94	
Turnout		155377	71.96	
BJP hold		Swing		

== See also ==
- List of constituencies of the Gujarat Legislative Assembly
- Bharuch district
