= Kalpasar Project =

Dam project in India

- Location of Kalpasar Project in Gujarat Location of Kalpasar Project in India
- Interactive map of Kalpasar Project
- Country: India
- Location: Gulf of Khambhāt, Gujarat
- Coordinates: 21°48′05″N 72°24′13″E
- Status: Proposed
- Construction began: May 2028 (projected)
- Opening date: Late 2035 target (projected)
- Construction cost: ₹1,33,246 crore
- Owner: Government of Gujarat
- Operators: Narmada, Water Resources, Water Supply and Kalpasar Department

Dam and spillways
- Type of dam: Dyke
- Impounds: Gulf of Khambhāt
- Length: 60.13 km (37.36 mi); 26.7 km (16.6 mi) in sea portion
- Elevation at crest: 14.5 m (48 ft) AMSL
- Width (crest): 140 m (460 ft)

Reservoir
- Creates: Kalpasar reservoir
- Total capacity: 7,807 million cubic metres
- Catchment area: Mahi, Sabarmati, Dhadhar and coastal rivers of Saurashtra
- Surface area: 1,600 km^{2} (620 sq mi)
- Normal elevation: Full reservoir level 3 m (9.8 ft) ASML; maximum water level 5 m (16 ft) AMSL
- Website; Official website

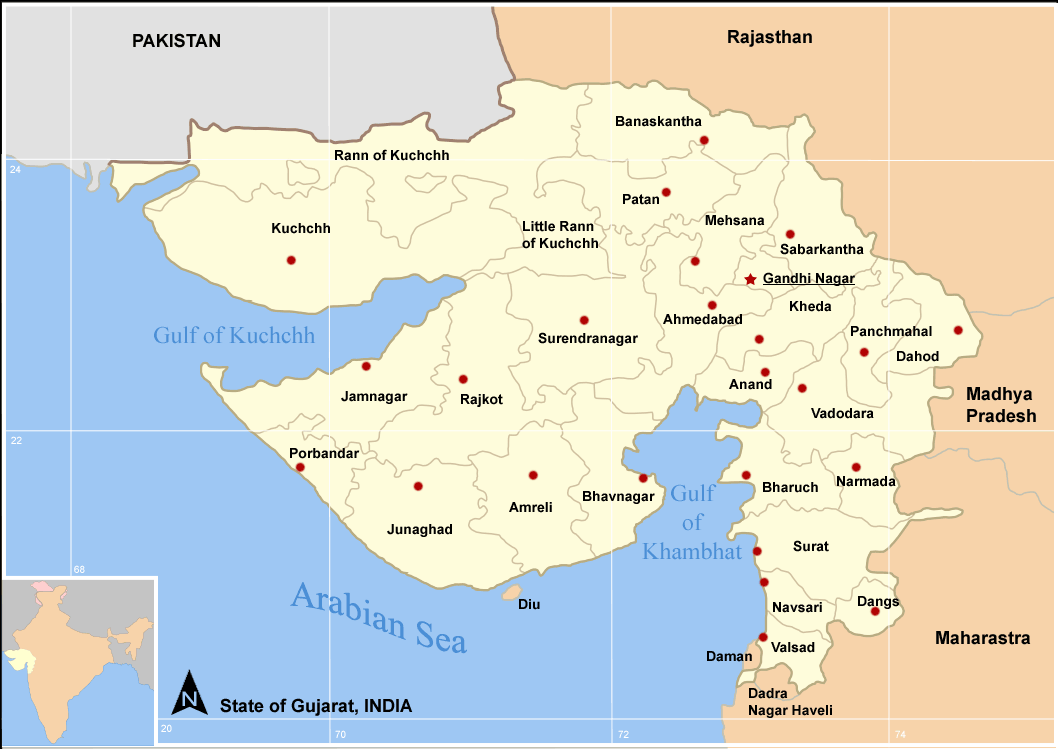
The Gulf of Khambhat is at the lower-right-centre of the map of Gujarat on the Arabian Sea.

The Kalpasar Project or the Gulf of Khambhat Development Project is a proposed water and transport infrastructure project in Gujarat, India. It envisages constructing a dyke across the Gulf of Khambhāt to create a large freshwater coastal reservoir by storing runoff from rivers draining into the gulf, including the Mahi, Sabarmati, Dhadhar and coastal rivers of Saurashtra.

The project has undergone several revisions since it was first proposed. Earlier versions envisaged a larger dam with a tidal power component, but the tidal power component was later dropped from the proposal. The 2022 pre-feasibility report described a proposed Kalpasar dyke of about 60.13 km (37.36 mi), including about 26.7 km (16.6 mi) in the gulf, with a freshwater reservoir of about 7,800 million cubic metres and an estimated cost of ₹100,200 crore. An environmental clearance application submitted in May 2026 gave an updated project estimate of ₹133,246 crore (US$14 billion).

Spending on feasibility studies began in 2004. As of December 2025, the detailed project report was at the finalisation stage. A later revised alignment kept the Narmada's discharge outside the proposed freshwater reservoir. In May 2026, India and the Netherlands signed a Letter of Intent for technical cooperation on the Kalpasar Project, while the Government of Gujarat submitted an application to the Ministry of Environment, Forest and Climate Change to begin detailed environmental studies for the project..

The Bhadbhut barrage on the Narmada River, associated with the wider Kalpasar planning framework, is under construction. Plans for an expressway linking Bhavnagar and Bharuch via the dyke began consultation in May 2026.

== Background ==
=== Etymology ===
Kalpasar means a lake that fulfils all wishes in Sanskrit. The construction of the word is similar to Kalpavriksha, a wish-fulfilling tree in Jain and Hindu mythology.

=== History ===
The Gulf of Khambhat was identified as a promising site for tidal-power generation by UNDP expert Eric Wilson in 1975. Successive governments were later presented with proposals for a project that came to be known as the Kalpasar Project. In 1988-89, a reconnaissance report was prepared for a dam across the Gulf of Khambhat. The report concluded that, assuming sound foundation conditions, closure of the gulf was technically feasible.

The project was later redesigned several times. In earlier versions, the main dam was proposed together with a tidal-power plant; later revisions reduced the scope and dropped the tidal-power component from the main proposal. The 2022 pre-feasibility report described a dyke of about 60.13 km (37.36 mi) and placed the estimated project cost at ₹100,200 crore. In February 2026, the Gujarat government stated that the detailed project report was in the finalisation stage and that, after approvals from the state and Union governments, the project was planned to be completed within eight years from the start of work.

== Project details ==
=== Objectives ===
Kalpasar aims to create a fresh water coastal reservoir in the Gulf of Khambhat by constructing a dyke across the gulf. The reservoir is intended to store runoff from rivers such as the Sabarmati, Mahi and Dhadhar, as well as coastal rivers of Saurashtra draining into the gulf. The stored water is proposed to be used for irrigation, drinking-water supply and industrial purposes in Gujarat.

The project is intended to provide irrigation to about 9.99 lakh hectares across 42 talukas in nine districts of Saurashtra, provide drinking and industrial water, support groundwater recharge, and reclaim nearly one lakh hectares of tide-affected land for development. The official Kalpasar website also describes the project as intended to provide irrigation benefits to about 10 lakh hectares in Saurashtra, improve drinking-water and industrial-water supply, support groundwater recharge and improve transport connectivity across the Gulf of Khambhat.

The project has also been proposed to improve transport connectivity between Saurashtra and South Gujarat through a road and rail corridor over the dyke. The 2026 proposal described a 130 m (430 ft) corridor carrying a 16-lane roadway and four-lane railway line, reducing the travel distance between Bhavnagar and Surat or Mumbai from about 240 km (150 mi) to about 60 km (37 mi).

Earlier versions of the project included tidal-power generation, but the tidal-power component was later dropped from the main proposal.

=== Scope and cost ===
==== Abandoned original plan and scope ====
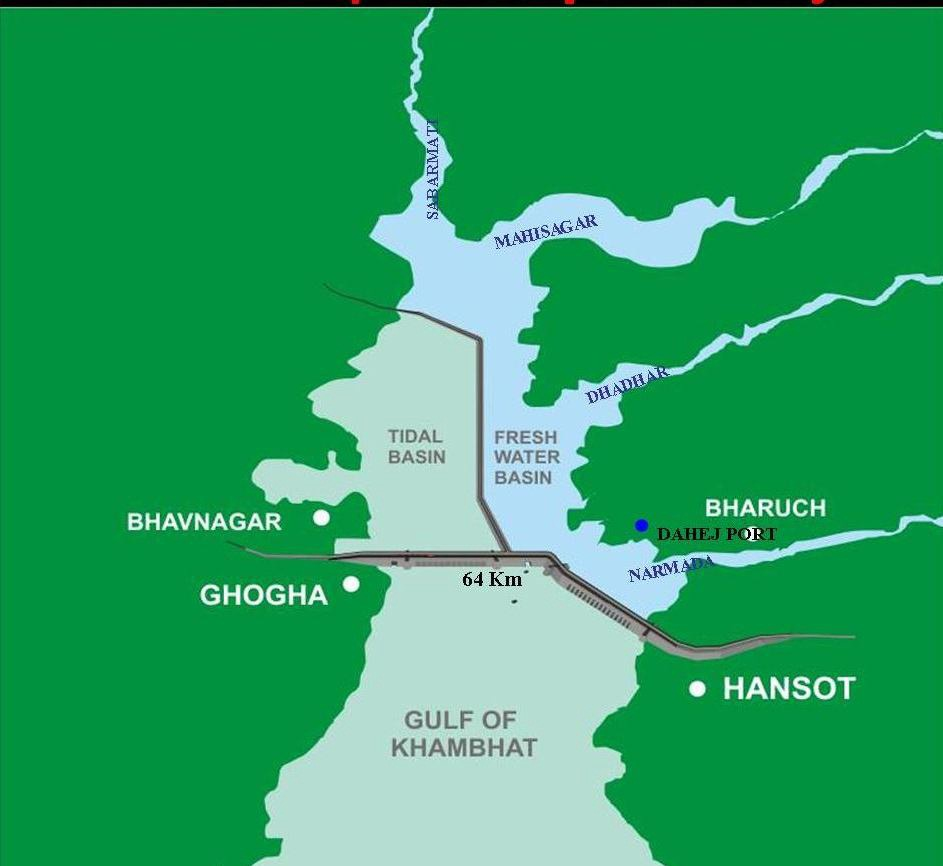
Map of old proposal scope with larger 64 km long Kalpasar dam and tidal-power plant, no longer valid.

The original plan envisaged a larger dam along with a tidal-power plant. A state government release described a Rs 55,000 crore project, then expected to be completed by 2020, with a reservoir having gross storage of 16,791 million cubic metres, a 64 km dam across the Gulf of Khambhat connecting Ghogha in Bhavnagar district with Hansot in Bharuch district, and a tidal-power generation house with an installed capacity of 5,880 MW. The tidal-power scheme would have required turbines and related power-generation works, but this component was dropped from the current main proposal. Another estimate given by the government in October 2010 stated that the proposed dam would be built from north of Bhavnagar in the west to Alandar in Dahej on the east. In 2017, the revised project plan reduced the size of the proposal and dropped the tidal-power component from the main scheme.

==== Revised current scope ====
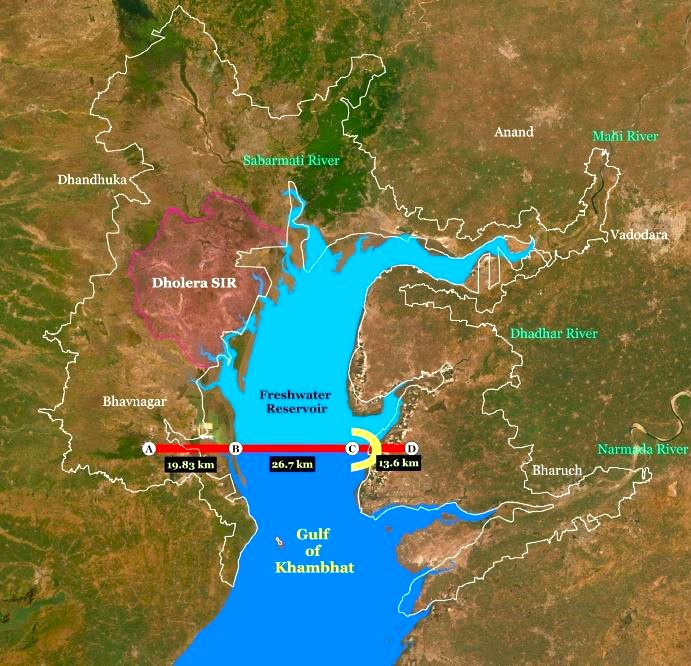
Map of the revised proposed Kalpasar Project

The current proposal differs from the earlier 64 km dam and tidal-power scheme. The 2022 pre-feasibility report describes a 60.13 km (37.36 mi) dyke across the Gulf of Khambhat, including about 26.7 km (16.6 mi) in the sea portion and landward sections on the Bhavnagar and Bharuch sides. The 2022 pre-feasibility report divides the proposed dyke into a 26.7 km (16.6 mi) sea portion, a 13.6 km (8.5 mi) eastern section towards Bharuch district and a 19.83 km (12.32 mi) western section towards Bhavnagar district.

The proposal includes a freshwater reservoir of about 7,800 million cubic metres and a 150 m (490 ft) wide road-rail corridor over the dyke. The official salient-features page describes the dam top width as 140 m (460 ft), with a 16-lane road and four-lane rail corridor, while the 2026 environmental-clearance figures describe a 130 m (430 ft) transport corridor. Tidal-power generation is not envisaged in the 2022 proposal, although the report identifies wind and solar potential around the project area.

A fresh environmental-clearance application submitted in May 2026 revised the project estimate to ₹1,33,246 crore. The updated proposal included a 60.13 km (37.36 mi) dyke, a reservoir of 7,807 million cubic metres, and a 130 m (430 ft) transport corridor carrying a 16-lane roadway and a four-lane railway line. The proposal also included a wind-solar hybrid system capable of generating 2,500 million units annually.

The updated alignment connects Kardej village in Bhavnagar district to Paniyadra village in Bharuch district. The alignment was selected to reduce direct impacts on ecologically sensitive areas.

- Kalpasar dyke: The proposed dyke across the Gulf of Khambhat is described in the 2022 pre-feasibility report as about 60.13 km (37.36 mi) long, including sea and landward sections in Bhavnagar and Bharuch districts.
- Bhadbhut barrage: The Bhadbhut Barrage Project is being constructed near Bhadbhut in Bharuch district on the Narmada River. The project includes a 1,648 m (5,407 ft) barrage with 90 gates, a six-lane bridge and about 20 km (12 mi) of flood-protection embankments with service roads on both banks. The official project website states that the work was awarded to DBL-HCC JV on an EPC basis and is in progress.
- Transport corridor: The dyke route has been described as reducing the road distance between Bhavnagar and South Gujarat from about 240 km around the gulf to about 60 km across it.
- Water storage and irrigation: The proposed reservoir is intended to store river runoff for irrigation, drinking-water supply and industrial use.

=== Issues ===
The Narmada River is one of India's notified national waterways. In 2019, the Union water-transport authorities raised concerns that the then design of the Bhadbhut barrage would allow only lower-capacity class III vessels, whereas the national-waterway notification envisaged class IV navigation. The Union government therefore asked the Gujarat government to upgrade the barrage and navigation-lock design to accommodate larger vessels.

The Kalpasar proposal also requires environmental and Coastal Regulation Zone appraisal. In 2022, the Expert Appraisal Committee deferred the proposal and asked for additional studies and information because of the project's multiple components. In 2026, the official Kalpasar website stated that the process for including the Kalpasar dyke as a permissible activity under the CRZ Notification, 2019, was under progress at the Ministry of Environment, Forest and Climate Change.

The revised alignment keeps the Narmada mouth outside the proposed reservoir. The L3 alignment shifts the dyke nearly 15 km north of the Narmada estuary, a design choice linked to estuarine ecology, fish breeding and migration patterns, and seabed conditions near the river mouth.

=== Dutch cooperation ===
In May 2026, India and the Netherlands signed a Letter of Intent for technical cooperation on the Kalpasar Project during Prime Minister Narendra Modi's visit to the Netherlands. The Letter of Intent was between India's Ministry of Jal Shakti and the Netherlands' Ministry of Infrastructure and Water Management.

During the same visit, Modi and the Dutch Prime Minister visited the Afsluitdijk, a 32 km Dutch dam and causeway. The Ministry of External Affairs stated that the visit highlighted parallels between Afsluitdijk and Kalpasar, and that both sides welcomed the Letter of Intent for technical cooperation on Kalpasar. It also stated that Dutch expertise in hydraulic engineering and India's scale of implementation presented opportunities for partnership.

The joint statement issued by the governments of India and the Netherlands stated that both leaders agreed to further enhance cooperation on the Kalpasar Project in Gujarat, where Dutch expertise and technical assistance could strengthen the India-Netherlands Strategic Partnership on Water.

=== Project progress ===
Feasibility, DPR and approvals

- 1975-2004: early planning and feasibility work: The project concept dates to the 1970s, with reconnaissance studies carried out in 1988-89. Spending on feasibility studies began in 2004.
- 2014-2019: feasibility studies: Bathymetric and land surveys were undertaken in the Gulf of Khambhat region, including work supervised by the National Institute of Ocean Technology. By July 2019, the state government said that 25 of 43 feasibility studies had been completed, eight were underway and ten were yet to commence.
- 2022: environmental-clearance proposal: In 2022, the Kalpasar Department submitted an environmental-clearance proposal for development of the Kalpasar project across the Gulf of Khambhat. The pre-feasibility report described a dyke of about 60.13 km (37.36 mi), of which about 26.7 km (16.6 mi) would be in the gulf, and listed the estimated project cost as ₹100,200 crore. The Expert Appraisal Committee deferred the proposal and sought further studies and information.
- 2023-2026: CRZ and DPR process: In May 2026, the official Kalpasar website stated that the process for including the Kalpasar dyke as a permissible activity under the CRZ Notification, 2019, was under progress at the Ministry of Environment, Forest and Climate Change. In February 2026, the Gujarat government told the state assembly that the DPR was in the finalisation stage as of 31 December 2025. The government stated that, once the DPR was finalised and approvals were received from the state and Union governments, the project was expected to take eight years from commencement. On 21 May 2026, the Kalpasar Department submitted a fresh application to the Ministry of Environment, Forest and Climate Change to begin detailed environmental studies for the project. The application identified collection of baseline data for the environmental impact assessment as the next priority, with CSIR-National Environmental Engineering Research Institute engaged as the accredited consultant. The 2026 filing indicated that, if required clearances are granted on schedule, construction could commence in May 2028 and be completed by late 2035.
- 2026: India-Netherlands cooperation and environmental clearance application: India and the Netherlands signed a Letter of Intent for technical cooperation on the Kalpasar Project in May 2026. In May, Government of Gujarat's Kalpasar Department also submitted an application to the Ministry of Environment, Forest and Climate Change to obtain approval for conducting a detailed Environmental Impact Assessment (EIA) study.

Construction

- Main Kalpasar dyke: As of 2026, construction of the main Kalpasar dyke had not commenced.
- Bhadbhut barrage: The Bhadbhut Barrage Project, associated with the wider Kalpasar planning framework, is under construction. The work was awarded to a DBL-HCC joint venture . In March 2025, officials reported that the project was 53% complete, with the first phase expected to be completed by July 2026 and the full project, including flood-protection embankments, by June 2027.

== Related projects ==
In December 2019, Chief Minister Vijay Rupani laid the foundation stone for a 100 MLD desalination plant in Dahej and announced additional desalination plants in Gujarat to meet industrial water demand. These projects are separate from the Kalpasar proposal but form part of wider water-supply planning in the state.

In May 2026, the Union Ministry of Road Transport and Highways initiated a separate planning process for a proposed 4-6 lane Bhavnagar-Bharuch expressway with a sea bridge across the Gulf of Khambhat. The proposed corridor, including the sea bridge, was tentatively estimated at 68 km (42 mi) and was being coordinated with the Gujarat government's Kalpasar Project. The ministry invited consultants to prepare a detailed project report covering the final alignment, sea bridge design, and environmental and social impact studies.

== See also ==
- Similar projects
  - Polavaram Project, under construction in India
  - Saemangeum Seawall, functional in Korea
  - Indian Rivers Inter-link
- Lists
  - List of rivers by dissolved load
  - List of drainage basins by area
  - List of rivers of India by discharge
  - List of rivers by discharge
  - List of dams and reservoirs in India
- Water management in India
  - Environment of India
  - Ground water in India
  - Interstate River Water Disputes Act
  - Irrigation in India
  - National Water Policy
  - Water scarcity in India
  - Water supply and sanitation in India
  - Water pollution in India
