= Goladara =

Coordinates: 21.812°N 72.665°E

Goladara is a village in Vagra Block of Bharuch district in Gujarat State of India. Its Panchayat name is Goladar. It is 33 km from Bharuch, district headquarters.
