= Bhadbhut barrage =

- Bhadbhut dam
- Interactive map of Bhadbhut barrage
- Country: India
- Location: Bhadbhut, Bharuch district, Gujarat
- Coordinates: 21.657345948098033°N 72.7939161852691°E
- Purpose: Irrigation, water supply, seawater ingress protection, flood protection
- Status: Under construction
- Construction began: 7 August 2020
- Construction cost: ₹4,167.7 crore (US$430 million)
- Owner: Government of Gujarat

Dam and spillways
- Type of dam: Barrage
- Impounds: Narmada River
- Length: 1.663 kilometres (1.0 mi)
- Width (crest): 27 metres (89 ft)

Reservoir
- Total capacity: 599 MCM
- Catchment area: 96,650 square kilometres (24,000,000 acres)
- Maximum length: 47 kilometres (29 mi)
- Maximum width: 1,600 metres (5,200 ft)
- Maximum water depth: 7.5 metres (25 ft)

The Bhadbhut barrage or Bhadbhut dam is an under-construction barrage on the Narmada River near Bhadbhut village in Bharuch district, Gujarat, India. The construction started on 7 August 2020 and will be completed by July 2027.

== History ==
The tender for the construction of the barrage and associated works was opened in June 2018. A joint venture of Dilip Buildcon and HCC was awarded the design and construction contract in July 2020. The barrage will cost ₹4,167.7 crore (US$430 million). The project period is 48 months.

On 7 August 2020, Chief Minister of Gujarat Vijay Rupani flagged off the construction. The Government of Gujarat had approved ₹5,322.19 crore (US$550 million) for the project. The Phase I of the project is expected to be completed in June 2026 and the Phase II in July 2027.

== Features ==
The project is a part of the envisaged Kalpasar Project. The project is tendered by the Narmada Water Resources, Water Supply and Kalpsar Department of the Government of Gujarat.

The barrage will be constructed 25 km upstream of the river mouth where it enters the Gulf of Khambhat in the Arabian Sea and 125 km downstream of the Sardar Sarovar dam. A 1.663 km long causeway-cum-weir barrage will be constructed. It will form a reservoir holding 599 MCM of fresh water.

The barrage will have 90 gates. A six-lane bridge will also be constructed on the barrage which will connect Dahej and Hazira with a reduced distance of 18 km. A total of 131.53 hectares (325.0 acres) of land in 14 villages will be acquired to build the flood protection embankment on both banks of the river. The north and south bank embankments were 14 km-long and 4 metres high while the south bank embankment will be 27 km-long and 8 metres high.

The barrage will provide fresh water for drinking, agriculture and industries in the region as well as stop the ingress of seawater. It will also have a separate channel for fishing activities.

Some local fishermen opposed the project citing that the fish population will decrease due to the barrage.
