= Shuklatirth =

Location in Gujarat, India

Coordinates: 21°45′10″N 73°07′16″E

Shuklatirth is a village and a tourist attraction in Bharuch district, Gujarat, India. It has five temples.

== Location ==
It is on the bank of Narmada River, 18 kilometers from Bharuch.
