= Nikora =

- village
- Location in Gujarat, India Nikora (India)
- Coordinates: 21.7858600°N 73.1396800°E
- Country: India
- State: Gujarat
- District: Bharuch

Languages
  - Official: Gujarati, Hindi
- Time zone: UTC+5:30 (IST)
- Vehicle registration: GJ
- Website: gujaratindia.com

Nikora is a village in Bharuch district in the state of Gujarat in India.
