= Vorasamni =

Village in Gujarat, India

- Village
- Location in Gujarat, India Vorasamni (India)
- Coordinates: 21°47′50″N 72°52′47″E
- Country: India
- State: Gujarat
- District: Bharuch
- Taluk: Vagra

Area
  - Total: 5.446 km^{2} (2.103 sq mi)
- Elevation: 14 m (46 ft)

Population (2011)
  - Total: 2,514
  - Density: 461.6/km^{2} (1,196/sq mi)

Languages
  - Official: Gujarati, Hindi
- Time zone: UTC+5:30 (IST)
- PIN: 392012
- STD code: 91 (0)2642

Vorasamni is a village located in Vagra Taluka of Bharuch District, Gujarat, India. It is located to the northwest of the city of Bharuch. At the 2011 census, its population was 2,514.

== Geography ==
Vorasamni is located to the north of Narmada River. It covers an area of 544.6 hectares of land.

== Demographics ==
As of the 2011 Indian census, vorasamni had 2,514 residents. The literacy rate of the village was 74.58%, slightly lower than the Gujarat state average of 78.03%.
