= Lord Patel =

Lord Patel may refer to:

- Narendra Patel, Baron Patel (born 1938), British physician
- Adam Patel, Baron Patel of Blackburn (born 1940), British businessman
- Kamlesh Patel, Baron Patel of Bradford (born 1960), British politician
