= Andada =

- Village
- Location in Gujarat, India Andada (India)
- Coordinates: 21.66509°N 73.03661°E
- Country: India
- State: Gujarat
- District: Bharuch

Population (2001)
  - Total: 13,506

Languages
  - Official: Gujarati, Hindi
- Time zone: UTC+5:30 (IST)
- PIN: 393010
- Vehicle registration: GJ
- Website: gujaratindia.com

Andada is a census town in Bharuch district in the state of Gujarat, India.

== Demographics ==
As of 2001 India census, Andada had a population of 13,506. Males constituted 54% of the population and females 46%. Andada has an average literacy rate of 73%, higher than the national average of 59.5%; with 57% of the males and 43% of females literate. 16% of the population is under 6 years of age.
