= Arunsinh Rana =

Indian politician

Arunsinh Rana (born 1958) is an Indian politician from Gujarat. He is a three time member of the Gujarat Legislative Assembly from Vagra Assembly constituency in Bharuch district. He won the 2022 Gujarat Legislative Assembly election representing the Bharatiya Janata Party.

== Early life and education ==
Rana is from Bharuch, Gujarat. He is the son of Ajitsinh Rana. He studied Class 10 and passed the SSC examinations in 1975. He is a business man who owns and runs a dairy farm and a petrol pump and his wife is also into family business.

== Career ==
Rana won from Vagra Assembly constituency representing the Bharatiya Janata Party in the 2022 Gujarat Legislative Assembly election. He polled 83,036 votes and defeated his nearest rival, Suleman Patel of the Indian National Congress, by a margin of 13,452 votes. He first became an MLA winning the 2012 Gujarat Legislative Assembly election beating Iqbal Patel of the Congress by a margin of 14,318 votes. He retained the Vagra seat for the BJP in the 2017 Gujarat Legislative Assembly election defeating Patel Sulemanbhai Musabhai of the Congress by a margin of 2,628 votes.
