= Ramesh Mistry =

Indian politician

Ramesh Mistry (born 1962) is an Indian politician from Gujarat. He is a member of the Gujarat Legislative Assembly from Bharuch Assembly constituency in Bharuch district. He won the 2022 Gujarat Legislative Assembly election representing the Bharatiya Janata Party.

== Early life and education ==
Mistry is from Bharuch, Gujarat. He is the son of Narandas Mistry. He passed Class 11 in 1982 at the Pioneer High School, Bharuch and later discontinued his studies. He is a contractor and his wife runs a grain shop.

== Career ==
Mistry won from Bharuch Assembly constituency representing the Bharatiya Janata Party in the 2022 Gujarat Legislative Assembly election. He polled 108,655 votes and defeated his nearest rival, Jaykant Patel of the Indian National Congress, by a margin of 64,473 votes. He first became an MLA winning the 2002 Gujarat Legislative Assembly election.
