= Barucha =

Barucha is a surname. Notable people with the surname include:

- Andreas Barucha (born 1979), German bobsledder
- Patrizia Barucha (born 1983), German footballer
- Stefan Barucha (born 1977), German bobsledder

== See also ==
- Baruch (given name)
- Bharucha
