= Shapurji =

Shapurji is a surname. Notable people with the surname include:

- Shapurji Broacha (1845–1920), Indian industrialist
- Shapurji Edalji (1841/1842–1918), Indian-born convert to Anglicanism
- Shapurji Saklatvala (1874–1936), Indian activist
- Kaikhosru Shapurji Sorabji (1892–1988), English composer
