= Anklesvar INA =

Ankleshwar INA
- city
- Location in Gujarat, India Ankleshwar INA (India)
- Coordinates: 21°37′37″N 73°00′43″E
- Country: India
- State: Gujarat
- District: Bharuch

Population (2001)
  - Total: 16,288

Languages
  - Official: Gujarati, Hindi
- Time zone: UTC+5:30 (IST)
- Vehicle registration: GJ
- Website: gujaratindia.com

Ankleshwar INA is a town and an industrial notified area in Bharuch district in the state of Gujarat, India.

== Demographics ==
At the 2001 India census, Ankleshwar INA had a population of 16,288 (males 54%, females 46%). Ankleshwar INA had an average literacy rate of 78%, higher than the national average of 59.5%; with 55% of the males and 45% of females literate. 14% of the population was under 6 years of age.
