= Achhod =

Coordinates: 21.9628594°N 72.8323462999999°E

Achhod is a village panchayat located in the Bharuch district of Gujarat state, India. It has a population of around 15,000.

Gandhinagar is the state capital for Achhod village, and is located around 150km away.
