= Bharucha =

Bharucha is an Indian (Parsi/Dawoodi Bohra) toponymic surname for someone originally from Bharuch in Gujarat, India. It may refer to:

- Albert Turner Bharucha-Reid (1927–1985), American mathematician
- Chitra Bharucha (born 1945), British-Indian haematologist, former vice chairman of the BBC Trust
- Farzana Barucha, Indian actress, choreographer and model
- Jamshed Bharucha (born 1956), Indian cognitive neuroscientist
- Kurush Bharucha-Reid (1995–2010), United States Army official
- Jimmy Bharucha (–2005), Sri Lankan broadcaster
- Nushrat Bharucha (born 1985), Indian film actress
- Perin Chandra née Bharucha (1918–2015), Indian author, communist, freedom fighter and peace activist
- Rustom Bharucha (born 1953), Indian writer, director and cultural critic
- Roshan Khursheed Bharucha, Pakistani politician
- Sam Piroj Bharucha (born 1936), 30th Chief Justice of India
- Zubin Bharucha (born 1970), Indian former first-class cricketer
