= Ikhar =

- Village
- Location in Gujarat, India Ikhar (India)
- Coordinates: 21.96°N 73.04°E
- Country: India
- State: Gujarat
- District: Bharuch

Population
  - Total: 12,342

Languages
  - Official: Gujarati, Hindi
- Time zone: UTC+5:30 (IST)
- PIN: 392230
- Telephone code: 2641
- Vehicle registration: GJ-16
- Website: gujaratindia.com

Ikhar is a village in the Bharuch district of the Indian state of Gujarat. The village has a population of 12,342.

== Notable people ==
- Ibrahim Ali Patel, Indian Politician
- Munaf Patel, cricketer
- Soyeb Sopariya, cricketer
