= GSFC (disambiguation) =

GSFC may refer to:

- Goddard Space Flight Center, a major NASA center in Maryland, US
- Gujarat State Fertilizers and Chemicals, in India
- Greenwell Star F.C., a Northern Irish association football club
- GSFC Complex INA, a town in Vadodara, Gujarat, India
