= Ankleshwar Assembly constituency =

Legislative Assembly constituency in Gujarat State, India

Coordinates: 21.63°N 73.02°E

Ankleshwar
- Constituency No. 154 for the Gujarat Legislative Assembly

Constituency details
- Country: India
- Region: Western India
- State: Gujarat
- District: Bharuch
- Lok Sabha constituency: Bharuch
- Total electors: 250,790
- Reservation: None

Member of Legislative Assembly
- 15th Gujarat Legislative Assembly
- Incumbent Ishwarsinh Patel
- Party: Bharatiya Janata Party
- Elected year: 2022

Ankleshwar is one of the 182 Legislative Assembly constituencies of Gujarat state in India. It is part of Bharuch district.

== List of segments ==
This assembly seat represents the following segments,

1. Ankleshwar Taluka (Part) Villages –Sengpur, jitali, dadhal, Dhanturiya, Taria, Matied, Haripura, Sakkarpor, Sarfuddin, Borbhatha, Borbhatha Bet, Surwadi, Divi, Diva, Pungam, Sajod, Kanwa, Nangal, Boidara, Gadkhol, Piraman, Amboli, Adol, Hajat, Sarthan, Motwan, Telva, Piludara, Umarwada, Kapodara, Bhadkodara, Kosamadi, Bakrol, Safipura, Alonj, Pardi Idris, Karmali, Panoli, Sanjali, Kharod, Bhadi, Ravidra, Adadara, Sisodara, Utiyadara, Bharan, Ankleshwar (M), Ankleshwar (INA)
2. Hansot Taluka

== Member of Legislative Assembly ==
Year	Member	Picture	Party
2007	Ishwarsinh Patel		Bharatiya Janata Party
2012	Ishwarsinh Patel		Bharatiya Janata Party
2017	Ishwarsinh Patel		Bharatiya Janata Party
2022	Ishwarsinh Patel		Bharatiya Janata Party

== Election results ==
=== 2022 ===
Gujarat Assembly election, 2022:Ankleshwar Assembly constituency
Party	Candidate	Votes	%	±%
BJP	Ishwarsinh Patel	96,405	60	−2.92
INC	Vijaysinh Patel	55,964	34.83	+1.71
AAP	Ankur Patel	5,356	3.33	
NOTA	None of the above	2,327	1.45	
Majority		40,441	25.17	
Turnout		160,688		
Registered electors		246,185		
BJP hold		Swing		

=== 2017 ===
2017 Gujarat Legislative Assembly election: Ankleshwar
Party	Candidate	Votes	%	±%
BJP	Ishwarsinh Patel	99,050	62.92	+5.26
INC	Anilkumar Bhagat	52,138	33.12	−2.6
Majority		46,912	29.80	
Turnout		1,57,432	71.22	
BJP hold		Swing		

=== 2012 ===
2012 Gujarat Legislative Assembly election
Party	Candidate	Votes	%	±%
BJP	Ishwarsinh Patel	82,645	57.66	
INC	Maganbhai Patel	51,202	35.72	
Majority		31,443	21.94	
Turnout		143,338	75.62	
BJP hold		Swing		

== See also ==
- List of constituencies of the Gujarat Legislative Assembly
- Bharuch district
- Gujarat Legislative Assembly
