= Maktampur =

- Census town
- Location in Gujarat, India Maktampur (India)
- Coordinates: 21.72599°N 73.0251°E
- Country: India
- State: Gujarat
- District: Bharuch

Population (2001)
  - Total: 9,245

Languages
  - Official: Gujarati, Hindi
- Time zone: UTC+5:30 (IST)
- Vehicle registration: GJ
- Website: gujaratindia.com

Maktampur is a census town in Bharuch district in the Indian state of Gujarat.

== Demographics ==
As of 2001 India census, Maktampur had a population of 9245. Males constitute 52% of the population and females 48%. Maktampur has an average literacy rate of 78%, higher than the national average of 59.5%: male literacy is 82%, and female literacy is 73%. In Maktampur, 12% of the population is under 6 years of age.
