= Bharuch INA =

Bharuch
- city
- Location in Gujarat, India Bharuch (India)
- Coordinates: 21.7°N 72.9667°E
- Country: India
- State: Gujarat
- District: Bharuch

Population (2001)
  - Total: 391

Languages
  - Official: Gujarati, Hindi
- Time zone: UTC+5:30 (IST)
- Vehicle registration: GJ
- Website: gujaratindia.com

Bharuch INA is a town and an industrial notified area in Bharuch district in the state of Gujarat, India. Bharuch derives its name from the great sage Bhrigu. The original name of Bharuch is 'Bhrigukachchha'. Bhrigu Rishi was one of the ten sons of Lord Brahma. There is also a story which indicates that Bhrigu along with his kin asked for temporary access to Bharuch which then belonged to Lakshmi since Bharuch is located on the banks of river Narmada also known as Rudra Deha. Chanra Mauli Mahadev is the Kul Devata of Bhargavs of Bharuch. Bhrigu never left the place and the Ashram of Brighu Rishi is located on the banks of Narmada.

== Demographics ==
As of 2001 India census, Bharuch INA had a population of 391. Males constitute 56% of the population and females 44%. Bharuch INA has an average literacy rate of 72%, higher than the national average of 59.5%; with male literacy of 76% and female literacy of 66%. 13% of the population is under 6 years of age.
