= Ishwarsinh Patel =

Indian politician

Ishwarsinh Thakorsinhji Patel
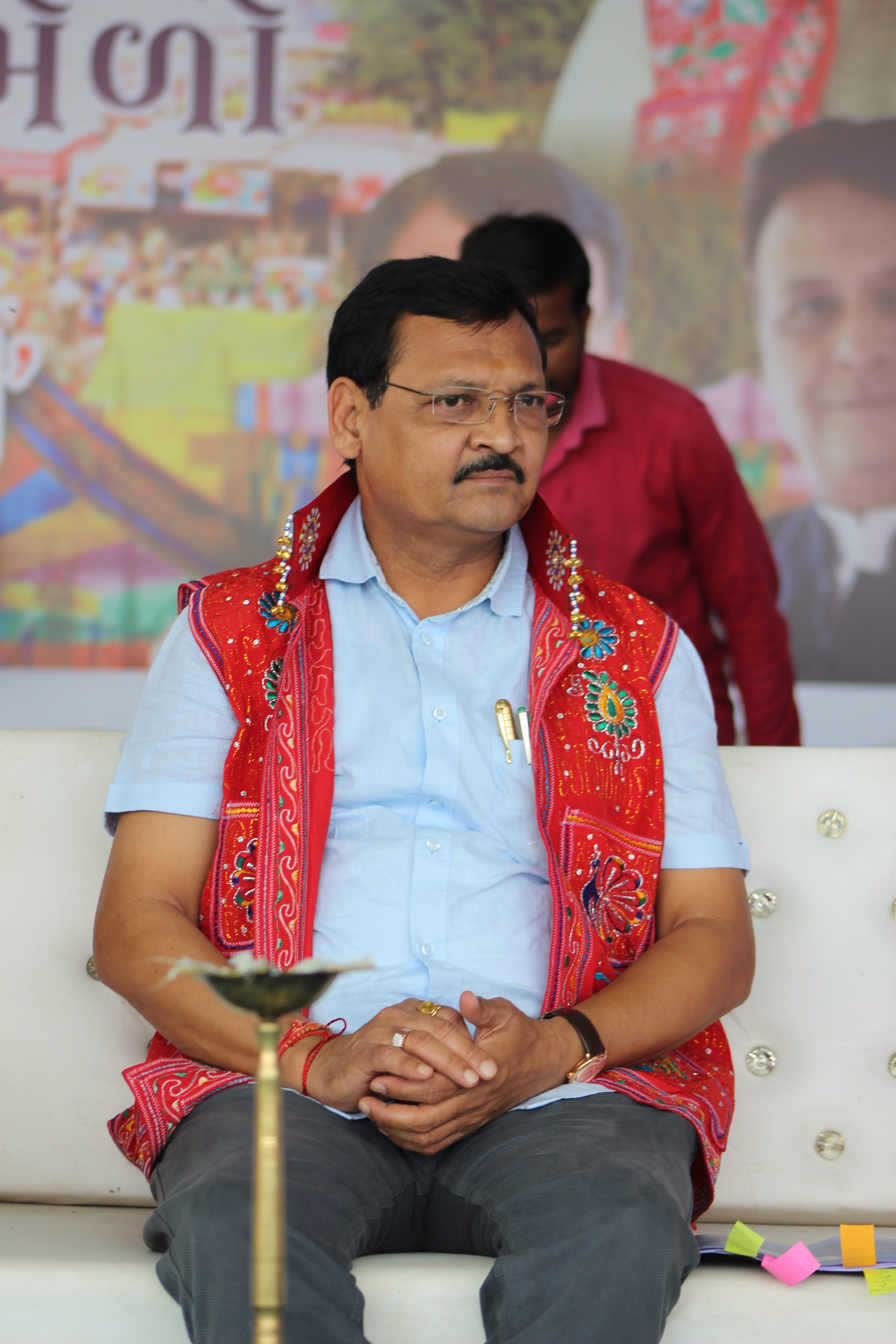
- Ishwarsinh Patel in Tarnetar fair as Minister of State, Co-operation, Sports, Youth and Cultural activities (Independent Charge), Transport (State Minister) Government of Gujarat, 2019

Minister for Water Resources and Water supply (Independent Charge)
- In office 17 October 2025 – Incumbent

MLA for Ankleshwar
- Incumbent
- Assumed office 2002
- Preceded by: Jayantibhai Patel
- Constituency: Ankleshwar

Personal details
- Born: Ishwarsinh Thakorsinhji Patel; 25 June 1965 (age 60) Kudadara village, Hansot tehsil, Bharuch district, Gujarat, India
- Citizenship: India
- Party: Bharatiya Janata Party
- Spouse: Varshaben Ishwarsinh Patel
- Parent: Thakorsinh Ghumansinhji Patel
- Occupation: Politician
- Profession: Agriculturist
- Nickname: Patel saab

Ishwarsinh Thakorsinhji Patel is an Indian politician, social worker and incumbent Member of Legislative Assembly for Ankleshwar assembly constituency as a member of Bharatiya Janata Party. He was state minister (Independent Charge) of Transport, Co-operation, Sports, Youth and Cultural activities in the Government of Gujarat from 2017 to 2022 in the Second Rupani ministry.

== Political career ==
- 1990 - 1995, District president of Bharatiya Janata Party, Bharuch district
- 2002 - 2007, 2nd term Member of Legislative Assembly for Ankleshwar Assembly constituency
- 2007 - 2012, 3rd term MLA for Ankleshwar
- 2012 - 2017, 4th term MLA for Ankleshwar
- 2017 - 2022, 5th term MLA for Ankleshwar
- 2017 - 2022, Minister of State for the ministries of Transport, Co-operation (Independent Charge), Sports (Independent Charge), Youth and Cultural activities (Independent Charge)
- 2022 - Ongoing, 6th term MLA for Ankleshwar
- 17 October 2025 - Incumbent, Minister for Water Resources and Water supply (Independent Charge)
