= Ibrahim Ali Patel =

Indian politician

Ibrahim Ali Patel was an Indian politician belonging to the Indian National Congress. He was the MLA representing Vagra constituency in Bombay. Currently in Gujarat, having won in 1952 Bombay Legislative Assembly general election.

== Family ==
He is part of the Patel family of Ikhar, the political and royal family of Bharuch. His father Ali Raje Patel and grandfather Kika Patel was Police Patel and Sarpanch of Ikhar.

== Politicians of the Patel family of Ikhar ==
Name	Designation
Kika Patel	Police Patel
Raje Patel	Police Patel
Mohmed Patel	Police Patel
Ali Patel	Police Patel
Mohmed Ali Patel well-known as JadaPatel	Police Patel and Congress leader
Ibrahim Ali Patel	MLA and Congress leader
Adam Ali Patel	Sarpanch
Mohmed Ahmed Patel	Police Patel
Ibrahim Mohmed Patel	Police Patel
Vali Patel well-known as SaduPatel	Caretaker of various shrines and Congress leader
Umarji Patel	Sarpanch and Congress leader
Abdul Adam Patel	Taluka Panchayat Member and Congress leader
Hanif Alli	British Politician and Councillor
Juned Mohmed Patel	Congress leader
