= Gujarat Narmada Valley Fertilisers & Chemicals =

Fertilizers and chemicals manufacturing company

Gujarat Narmada Valley Fertilizers & Chemicals
- Company type: Public
- Traded as: BSE: 500670; NSE: GNFC
- Industry: Fertilizers; Chemicals
- Founded: 1976; 50 years ago
- Headquarters: Bharuch, Gujarat, India
- Revenue: ▲₹10,227 crore (US$1.1 billion) (FY23)
- Operating income: ▼₹1,879 crore (US$200 million) (FY23)
- Net income: ▼₹1,464 crore (US$150 million) (FY23)
- Subsidiaries: (n)Code Solutions
- Website: www.gnfc.in

Gujarat Narmada Valley Fertilizers & Chemicals (GNFC) is an Indian manufacturer of fertilizers and chemicals. GNFC was founded in 1976, jointly promoted by the Government of Gujarat and the Gujarat State Fertilizers and Chemicals (GSFC).

Located in the industrial belt of Bharuch, GNFC is a major producer of urea and nitrophosphate fertilizers, neem-based products, and industrial chemicals such as methanol, formic acid, nitric acid and acetic acid. As of fiscal year 2021–22, fertilizers generated 29% of the company's revenue, while chemicals segment contributed 70%.

== (n)Code ==
(n)Code Solutions, a subsidiary of GNFC, produces digital certificates for the Government of India (including the digital Aadhaar card for over 1 billion Indians). The solution was the result of a partnership with Entrust.
