= Gujarat State Fertilizers and Chemicals =

Indian chemicals and fertilizers manufacturer

Coordinates: 22.3745°N 73.1555°E

- Type: Public
- Traded as: BSE: 500690; NSE: GSFC
- Industry: Fertilizers; Chemicals
- Founded: 1962; 64 years ago
- Headquarters: Vadodara, Gujarat, India
- Revenue: ▲₹11,445 crore (US$1.2 billion) (FY23)
- Operating income: ▲₹1,618 crore (US$170 million) (FY23)
- Net income: ▲₹1,293 crore (US$130 million) (FY23)
- Owner: Government of Gujarat (37.84%)
- Website: www.gsfclimited.com

Gujarat State Fertilizers & Chemicals Limited (GSFC) is a publicly-traded Indian chemicals and fertilizers manufacturer, partly owned by the Government of Gujarat. GSFC was founded in 1962 and has its headquarters in Vadodara on the Ahmedabad Vadodara Expressway. As of fiscal year 2021–22, fertilizers such as diammonium phosphate, ammonium sulfate and urea generated over 60% of the company's revenue, while industrial products including caprolactam, nylon 6, melamine and MEK oxime contributed the remaining share.

Oil and gas discovered in Bombay High and South Basin triggered the birth of 8 new generation fertilizer plants to fulfill the growing food needs of India. In 1976, it set up a plant in Bharuch which trades as Gujarat Narmada Valley Fertilisers & Chemicals, as a subsidiary of GSFC.

In 2012, GSFC incorporated a wholly owned subsidiary called GSFC AgroTech Limited (GATL).

In 2015, GSFC helped start GSFC University in Vadodara, Gujarat.

== See also ==
- GSFC Complex INA
