= Sigam =

- village
- Location in Gujarat, India Sigam (India)
- Coordinates: 22.1450°N 72.5862°E
- Country: India
- State: Gujarat
- District: Bharuch

Population
  - Total: 4,000

Languages
  - Official: Gujarati, Hindi
- Time zone: UTC+5:30 (IST)
- PIN: 392170
- Vehicle registration: GJ
- Jambusar: jambusar
- Climate: normal (Köppen)
- Website: gujaratindia.com

Sigam is a village in the district, of Bharuch, in the Indian state of Gujarat.
