= Adam Patel, Baron Patel of Blackburn =

British businessman and life peer (1940–2019)

The Right Honourable The Lord Patel of Blackburn
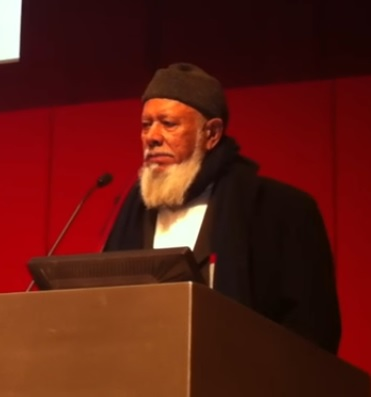

Member of the House of Lords
- Lord Temporal
- Life peerage 14 February 2000 – 29 May 2019

Personal details
- Born: 7 June 1940 British India
- Died: 29 May 2019 (aged 78)
- Party: Labour

Adam Hafejee Patel, Baron Patel of Blackburn (7 June 1940 – 29 May 2019) was a British businessman and Labour member of the House of Lords.

== Biography ==
Son of Hafejee Ismail Patel and wife Aman (née Zumla) Hafejee, he was educated at The Pioneer High School, Bharuch, in the modern-day Indian state of Gujarat, and the Maharaja Sayajirao University of Baroda, where he graduated with a Bachelor of Commerce.

Following his retirement as the managing director of a clothing manufacturing company, he was Director of the East Lancashire Training Enterprise Council, and Enterprise plc. He also served as President of Lancashire Council of Mosques, Vice-President of the Blackburn Community Relations Council, counsellor to the Muslim Council of Britain and chairman of the British Hajj Commission.

On 14 February 2000, he was created a life peer as Baron Patel of Blackburn, of Langho in the County of Lancashire.

Patel was an Honorary Fellow of the Bolton Institute as well as of the University of Central Lancashire. He became an Honorary Patron of the leading Blackburn Rovers supporters group, The BRFC Action Group, in May 2012.

He was a friend and political ally of Jack Straw.

Patel was married since 1964. He had four sons and four daughters.

Patel died on 29 May 2019 at the age of 78.
