= Kurush Bharucha-Reid =

United States Army official (1995–2010)

Colonel Kurush (KB) Bharucha-Reid
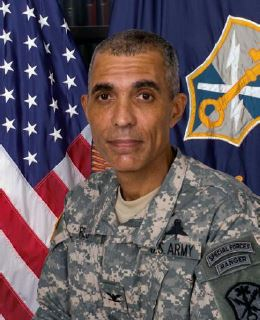
- US Special Forces soldier, intelligence, and special operations expert
- Born: 29 March 1955; Detroit, Michigan
- Died: 26 May 2010 (aged 55); Walter Reed Army Medical Center
- Education: State University of New York, 1988
- Occupation: Special Forces
- Father: Albert Turner Bharucha-Reid

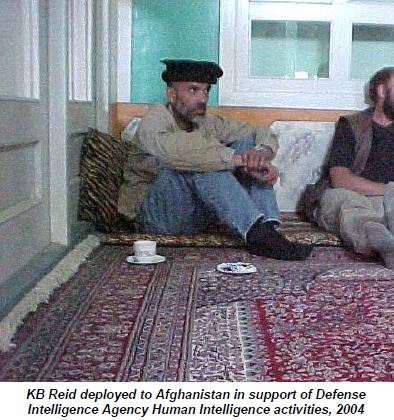
KB working in Afghanistan

Colonel Kurush Bharucha-Reid or "KB" (29 March 1955 – 26 May 2010) was a United States Army official. He gained prominence as an intelligence and special operations expert in the United States Army from 1973 to 2010 who garnered respect across the US Special Operations and United States Intelligence Community for his significant impacts on military human intelligence, known as HUMINT.

Bharucha-Reid was of Parsi and African-American descent and was born in Detroit, Michigan in 1955. He provided major contributions to the US Army's Human Intelligence programs and had considerable impacts on both training and combat missions around the world culminating with his achievement in receiving the Office of Strategic Service Society's Donovan Award, is a US Army Military Intelligence Hall of Fame inductee, along with numerous other combat decorations and medals. For similar reasons the Defense Intelligence Agency (DIA) established a new DIA training facility in Norfolk, Virginia dedicated as the Reid Center in his tribute to service and career impacts.

== Biography ==
Kurush Bharucha-Reid was born to mathematician Albert Turner Bharucha-Reid, of Hampton, Virginia and Rodabe Bharucha-Reid, a Parsi Zoroastrian from India. He graduated from Cranbrook Schools in 1973.

Bharucha-Reid, who was commonly known as KB, enlisted in the US Army's Special Forces in 1973. Bharucha-Reid's skilled leadership and training support to foreign militaries in small-unit weapons and special operations tactics quickly resulted in his promotion to Sergeant First Class.

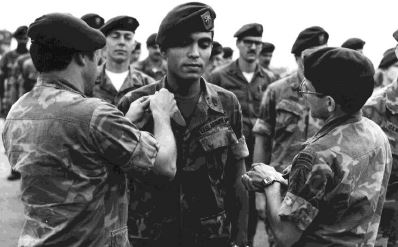
KB being promoted to First Sergeant

Then, in 1983, he was selected to attend Officer Candidate School. He was then commissioned as a Second Lieutenant in the US Army's Military Intelligence career field after receiving his bachelor of science degree from the State University of New York in 1988.

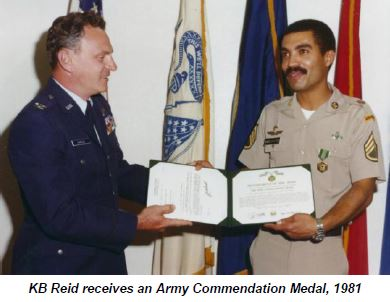
KB receiving an Army Commendation.

A year later, in 1984, Bharucha-Reid made a permanent change of station to the Republic of Korea (ROK) where he served as the Chief of the Combined Liaison Team, 501st Military Intelligence Brigade, US Army Intelligence and Security Command. Drawing from his earlier leadership experience, Bharucha-Reid led a "one of a kind" special operations organization providing total immersion training to a small team of Republic of Korea personnel. This unit was then capable of performing sensitive and high-risk intelligence collection operations in the event of a major military confrontation on the Korean Peninsula.

Three years later, in 1987, Bharucha-Reid was selected for membership in the US Army's Military Intelligence Excepted Career Program, (otherwise known as GREAT SKILL). Upon entry into this element of the US Army, he then served another 23 years in assignments for the US Army's Military Intelligence function.

== Assignments ==
1. Regional Desk Officer and Special Assistant for Military Affairs for a national-level intelligence agency with focus on East Asian and Near East operations.
2. Commander of a Defense Human Intelligence (HUMINT) Service base in Bosnia.
3. Director Current Operations of a Tier 1 Special Mission Unit.
4. Second Tour to Bosnia: Combined Joint Staff Branch for Intelligence for Combined Joint Task Force Fervent Archer.

After those missions and assignments, in 2002, Bharucha-Reid was tasked by the US Army to stand up and then command a sensitive intelligence collection detachment under the Defense Human Intelligence Service. There he deployed to the War in Afghanistan as a human intelligence case officer assigned to provide direct support to US Special Operations Command. He then again deployed to Afghanistan in 2004 in the capacity of the Commander of a Defense Human Intelligence base where critical human intelligence activities were conducted during US surge operations in Afghanistan. These operations were in support of Afghanistan's first democratic elections after the fall to the Taliban and al-Qaeda.

In 2005, Bharucha-Reid deployed to Iraq as a Senior Human Intelligence Advisor where he helped facilitate an inter-agency coordination cell. Upon completion of that assignment he later returned to serve as the Chief of the Military Group and Senior Department of Defense Instructor at a prestigious inter-agency intelligence training institution. Finally, in May 2009 he assumed command of the US Army Field Support Center.

=== Death and afterward ===
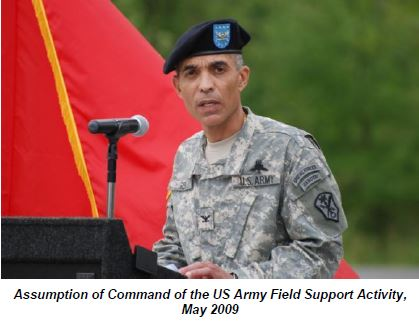
Bharucha-Reid assuming command at the Army's Field Support Center

During his last assignment at AFSC, he was diagnosed and died as a result of pancreatic cancer.

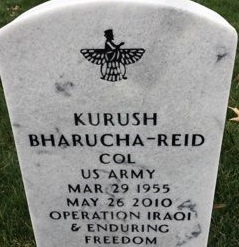
Bharucha-Reid's gravesite – notice the Farohar or Zoroastrian religious indicator.

He was then laid to rest in Arlington National Cemetery on 9 September 2010.

A year later in October 2011, the Defense Intelligence Agency's Contingency Operation Base located in Kabul, Afghanistan was renamed to Camp K.B. Reid in honor of Bharucha-Reid's service.

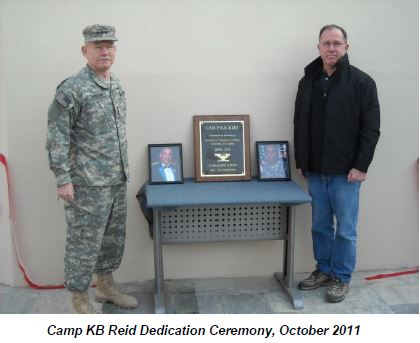
The renaming of Camp KB Reid

Additionally, in 2012, Defense Intelligence Agency established a new training facility in Norfolk, Virginia dedicated as the Reid Center. These dedications were undertaken to illustrate the considerable impact Bharucha-Reid had on the US Intelligence Community at large and the defense human intelligence gathering.

Finally, in February 2014, the US Army's Human Intelligence Training Joint Center of Excellence established an Honor Graduate Program in recognition of outstanding student performance in the Source Operations Course and the Defense Advanced Tradecraft Course. Today, both uniformed service members and civilians are awarded the Colonel Kurush Bharucha-Reid Award for Excellence in Human Intelligence Tradecraft.

== Honors, decorations, awards and distinctions ==
In addition to Bharucha-Reid's career achievements his awards include:

The Defense Superior Service Medal, Bronze Star Medal with one Oak Leaf Cluster, Defense Meritorious Service Medal with three Oak Leaf Clusters, Meritorious Service Medal with three Oak Leaf Clusters, Joint Service Commendation Medal, Army Commendation Medal with one Oak Leaf Cluster, Army Achievement Medal, and the Ranger, Special Forces, Pathfinder, Master Parachutist, and Military Free Fall Jump Master badges.

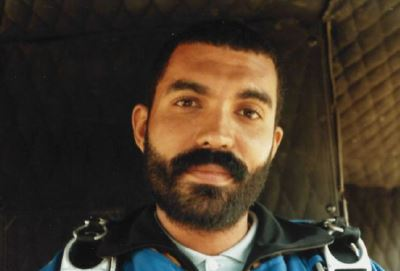
Bharucha-Reid was a Jump Master and High Altitude Low Opening (HALO) certified.

In addition, Bharucha-Reid received the Office of Strategic Service Society's Donovan Award and was inducted into the US Army's Military Intelligence Hall of Fame in 2014.
