= Shapurji Broacha =

Sir Shapurji Burjorji Broacha KCIE
- Shapoorji Broacha
- Born: 30 April 1845; Bharuch, Bombay Presidency, British India
- Died: 23 June 1920 (aged 75); Bombay, Bombay Presidency, British India
- Citizenship: Indian, British
- Occupations: Industrialist, philanthropist
- Organization: Sir Shapurji Broacha Mills
- Title: Sheriff of Bombay
- Term: 1911
- Spouse: Lady Pirojbai
- Relatives: Cyrus Broacha (Great Grand Child)
- Family: Broacha Family

Sir Shapurji Burjorji Broacha (30 April 1845 – 23 June 1920) was an Indian industrialist and philanthropist. He was appointed as the Sheriff of Bombay in 1911 during the visit of the King-Emperor, then King George V.

He was the president of Bombay Native Share and Stock Brokers' Association for more than 25 years. Sir Shapurji Broacha was connected as a director with at least twenty-five joint-stock companies. He was honoured with a Knighthood by His Majesty the King-Emperor on the occasion of the 1911 Coronation Durbar. In 1913, he was the only Indian member to be appointed as a member of Royal Commission on Indian Finance and Currency. He was one of the founding members of Bank of India, which was founded in 1906.

== Early life ==
He was born on 30 April 1845 at Bharuch, Bombay Presidency to poor parents. His father died when he was a child, so his mother and his sisters migrated to Bombay when he was only 12 years old. He would stitch clothes with his mother and his sisters in order to earn a living in Bombay, His family couldn't afford higher education for shapoorji but young shapoorji was able to speak fluent English without any training. He joined Bombay, Baroda and Central India Railway as a Petty Clerk in 1863, after a year he joined the Asian bank also as a petty clerk but his love of maths grew in his life working as a clerk in the bank. In 1864 he became a stockbroker.

== Death ==
Broacha died on 23 June 1920, at the age of 75. It was reported that a large number of commercial houses, share, bullion, and various other markets were closed on 24 June 1920, the day after his death.

== Honours and legacy ==
He was honoured with a Knighthood by His Majesty the King-Emperor on the occasion of the 1911 Coronation Durbar.

On 1 March 1923, White marble busts on the grey pedestal of the late Sir Shapurji Broacha and his wife Lady Pirojbai were unveiled in the Masina Hospital compound, Mumbai by Sir George Lloyd, the Governor of Bombay.

A bust of Broacha was unveiled at the Stock Exchange Building, Bombay by Michael Knatchbull, the Governor of Bombay on 4 April 1935.

One of the oldest and largest hostels for Boys of Institute of Science, in Banaras Hindu University, built in 1921 is named after him as Broacha hostel.

As per the Gujarat Government Gazette, in 1961, the Sir Shapurji Burjorji Broacha Hall, a public hall in Gujarat, is named after him. It was built at a cost of Rs. 49,446 and was opened on 12 November 1912.
