= Gujarat Fluorochemicals =

Industrial refrigerant manufacturer in India

Gujarat Fluorochemicals Limited
- Type: Public, part of InoxGFL Group
- Traded as: BSE: 500173; NSE: FLUOROCHEM
- Industry: Industrial gases
- Founded: 1987
- Headquarters: Inox Towers; Noida, Uttar Pradesh, India
- Revenue: ▲₹5,775 crore (US$600 million) (FY23)
- Net income: ▲₹1,328 crore (US$140 million) (FY23)
- Website: www.gfl.co.in

Gujarat Fluorochemicals Limited (GFL) is an industrial refrigerant manufacturer under INOXGFL Group in India. It is one of the largest producers (by volume) of chloromethane, refrigerants and polytetrafluoroethylene (PTFE).

== History ==
The company was incorporated in 1987, is a subsidiary of InoxGFL Group. GFL has two manufacturing facilities in Gujarat, a refrigerant plant at Ranjitnagar near Ghoghmba town Panchmahal, and a PTFE facility at Dahej. It has two subsidiaries - Gujarat Fluorochemicals Americas LLC and Gujarat Fluorochemicals GmbH to cater Americana and European operations respectively.

== Controversies ==
In 2000s, the company was embroiled in "shoddy practice" of destroying HFC 23, a byproduct released in the coolant-making process at its plant at Nathkuva village in Halol. In return, company was earning "lucrative" carbon credit. As per the 2010 Hindustan Times reporting, the company earned nearly half of its revenue for FY 2009-2010 from the sale of carbon credits.

== Accidents ==
- On 16 December 2021, 7 people died and 23 others were injured in a blast that took place at GFL's refrigerant manufacturing plant in Ranjitnagar village, Ghoghamba taluka of Panchmahal district.
