= Dhadhar River =

Dhadhar

Location
- Country: India
- State: Gujarat
- District: Panchmahal district

Physical characteristics
- Source: Pavagadh Hill, Panchmahal district, Gujarat
  - location: India
  - coordinates: 22°27′40″N 73°30′42″E
  - elevation: 762 m (2,500 ft)
- Mouth: Dhadhar River
  - location: Gulf of Khambat
  - coordinates: 22°06′52″N 73°05′00″E
  - elevation: 0 m
- Length: 142 km (88 mi)

Dhadhar River is a river in western India in Gujarat state that originates in Pavagadh Hill in Panchmahal district, Gujarat, about 50 km northeast of Vadodara and 68 km south of Godhra. Its basin has a maximum length of 142 km. The total catchment area of the basin is 4,201 square kilometres (1,622 sq mi).

== Course ==
After originating from hills northeast of Vadodara city, Dhadhar River flows southwest. It flows east and then south of Vadodara city. At Pingalwada (22.0494° N 73.1213° E), 5 km south of Vadodara city, Vishwamitri River that flows through Vadodara city, joins Dhadhar River. Dhadhar River then flows southwest and drains in Gulf of Khambhat. The name of the river downstream from Pingalwada officially remains Dhadhar River though some persons living in Vadodara city like to call it Vishwamitri River.

Other Tributaries of Dhadhar river are Jambuoriver, Dev and Surya river.
