= Albert Turner Bharucha-Reid =

American mathematician (1927–1985)

- Born: Albert Turner Reid; November 13, 1927; Hampton, Virginia, U.S.
- Died: February 26, 1985 (aged 57)
- Education: Iowa State University, University of Chicago
- Known for: Probability theory, Markov chains
- Scientific career
- Fields: Mathematics, statistics
- Workplaces: Columbia University, University of California, Berkeley, University of Oregon, Polish Academy of Sciences, Wayne State University, Atlanta University

Albert Turner Bharucha-Reid (November 13, 1927 – February 26, 1985) was an American mathematician who worked extensively on probability theory, Markov chains, and statistics. The author of more than 70 papers and 6 books, his work touched on such diverse fields as economics, physics, and biology.

== Life ==
Bharucha-Reid was born Albert Turner Reid the son of William Thaddeus Reid and Mae Marie Beamon Reid of Hampton, Virginia. He studied mathematics and biology at Iowa State University, where completed a BS in 1949. He continued his studies at the University of Chicago from 1950 to 1953, where he began to focus more intensely on statistics and probability. He published eight papers during his time at the University of Chicago, but he did not finish his PhD dissertation because he felt it was a waste of time.

In 1954, he married Rodabe Phiroze Bharucha. He then legally changed his name to Albert Turner Bharucha-Reid. He had two children, Kurush Feroze Bharucha-Reid, and Rustam William Bharucha-Reid.

== Work ==
Bharucha-Reid published his first paper, a work on mathematical biology, when he was only 18 years old. He went on to teach and lecture in the United States, Europe, and India. He held professorships or research positions at Columbia University, the University of California, Berkeley, the University of Oregon, Wayne State University, the Polish Academy of Sciences, and Atlanta University. In particular, in 1970 he was appointed Associate Provost and Dean of Graduate Studies at Wayne State University.te

== Legacy ==
A lecture series has been named in his honor by the National Association of Mathematicians.

== Selected publications ==
Bharucha-Reid is the author or coauthor of:

- Elements of the Theory of Markov Processes and Their Application (McGraw Hill, 1960; Dover, 1997)
- Random Integral Equations (Academic Press, 1972)
- Random Polynomials (with M. Sambandham, Academic Press, 1986)

He is also the editor of:

- Probabilistic Methods in Applied Mathematics (edited, Academic Press, Vol. I, 1968; Vol. II, 1970)
- Probabilistic Analysis and Related Topics (edited, Academic Press, Vol. I, 1978; Vol. II, 1979; Vol. III, 1983)
- Approximate Solution of Random Equations (North-Holland, 1979)
