= Munaf Patel =

Indian cricketer

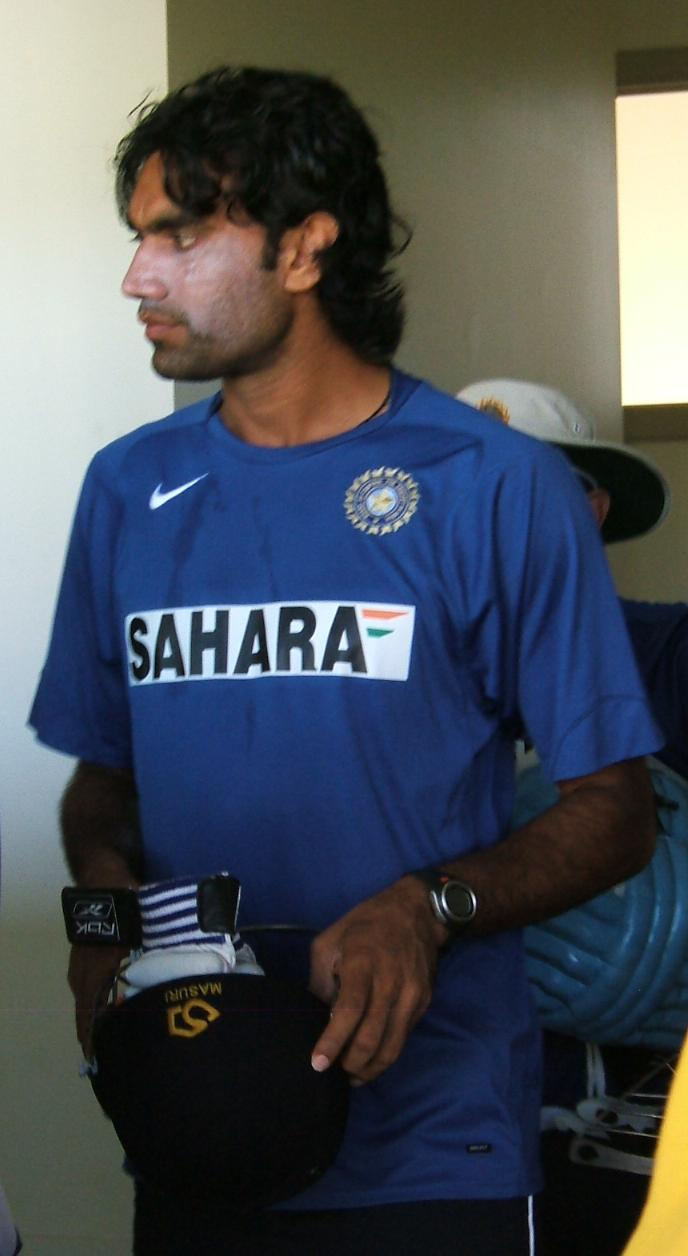

Personal information
- Full name: Munaf Musa Patel
- Born: 12 July 1983 (age 43); Ikhar, Gujarat, India
- Height: 6 ft 3 in (1.91 m)
- Batting: Right-handed
- Bowling: Right arm fast medium
- Role: Bowler

International information
- National side: India (2006–2011)
- Test debut (cap 255): 9 March 2006 v England
- Last Test: 3 April 2009 v New Zealand
- ODI debut (cap 163): 3 April 2006 v England
- Last ODI: 16 September 2011 v England
- ODI shirt no.: 13
- T20I debut (cap 34): 9 January 2011 v South Africa
- Last T20I: 31 August 2011 v England
- T20I shirt no.: 13

Domestic team information
- Years: Team
- 2003/04–2004/05: Mumbai
- 2005/06–2008/09: Maharashtra
- 2008/09–2018: Baroda
- 2008–2010: Rajasthan Royals (squad no. 13)
- 2011–2013: Mumbai Indians (squad no. 13)
- 2017: Gujarat Lions (squad no. 13)
- 2020: Kandy Tuskers

Career statistics
Competition	Test	ODI	T20I	FC
Matches	13	70	3	69
Runs scored	60	74	0	761
Batting average	7.50	6.72	0.00	14.92
100s/50s	0/0	0/0	0/0	0/2
Top score	15*	15	0	78
Balls bowled	2,658	2,988	60	12,259
Wickets	35	86	4	231
Bowling average	38.54	28.86	21.50	24.43
5 wickets in innings	0	0	0	8
10 wickets in match	0	0	0	2
Best bowling	4/25	4/29	2/25	6/13
Catches/stumpings	6/–	11/–	0/–	14/–
Medal record
Men's Cricket
Representing India
ICC Cricket World Cup
Winner	2011 India-Bangladesh-Sri Lanka
- Source: ESPNcricinfo, 13 October 2017

Munaf Patel (born 12 July 1983) is a former Indian cricketer who played all formats of the game. He played for the West Zone in the Duleep Trophy and Gujarat, Mumbai cricket team and Maharashtra cricket team in domestic arena. Patel was a member of the Indian team that won the 2011 Cricket World Cup. In November 2018, he announced his retirement from cricket. He was born in Ikhar, Gujarat, India.

== Domestic career ==
Patel first gained prominence in 2003 at the age of 20 before he had even played first class cricket for Gujarat, when he was invited to the MRF Pace Foundation in Chennai by the Indian chairman of selectors Kiran More. There he attracted the attention of visiting Australian captain Steve Waugh, and the director Dennis Lillee, a former Australian fast bowler, with his raw pace. With the backing of Sachin Tendulkar, he was signed by Mumbai in a transfer deal, in late 2003, without ever representing his native Gujarat.

He was signed by Rajasthan Royals for the inaugural IPL season taking 14 wickets as the Royals won the title. He later moved to Mumbai Indians where he enjoyed his most prolific season in 2011 taking 22 wickets including a record breaking 5/21 against KXIP in Mohali. However, in the 2014 IPL Auctions, he was unsold despite a low base price of 10 Lakhs only. In the tenth season of the Indian Premier League he was picked by Gujarat Lions for 30 lakh rupees but did not play.

== International career ==
=== Doorstep to Indian national team ===
In 2004, he struggled with injuries, and was criticised by India A coach Sandeep Patil, who believed that he had a mental problem dealing with his injuries. He was also sent to Australian Institute of Sport for bio-mechanical analysis on his bowling action, to improve its efficiency. In August 2005, he transferred to Maharashtra, and after taking 10 wickets against England in a tour match for the Board President's XI, he was rewarded with his selection in the Indian Test Squad for the 2nd Test against England in Mohali. Patel recorded the figures of 7/97 on his Test debut, including 4/25 in the second innings and demonstrated an ability to swing the ball in both directions.

=== Early career ===
In the 2005–2006 Test Series against West Indies, Patel proved he was among the fastest bowlers in India, bowling regularly at speeds of over 85 miles per hour (137 km/h) and has produced balls at a pace over the 90 miles per hour (140 km/h) mark. However, more impressive than his ability to bowl at a very quick pace has been his control, a skill lacking in recent Indian fast bowlers. In the West Indies, however, Munaf suffered the ignominy of being hit for 6 fours in an over by Ramnaresh Sarwan. Patel fell short of the record of conceding the most runs off an over by 4 runs.

In the second match of the DLF Cup in Malaysia, Munaf came up with figures of 3/54 against Australia, picking up the wickets of Phil Jaques, Michael Clarke and Stuart Clark. In the final game of the same tournament, he dismissed Australian captain Ricky Ponting for just 4, on the way to 1/32 off 9 overs.

In the first match of the 2006 ICC Champions Trophy against England, Munaf Patel again produced figures of 3/18 – winning the match for India and gaining the man of the match award.

=== 2007 World cup ===
He was part of the Indian 2007 World Cup squad which failed to progress from the group stage and played during India's One-day International series against Bangladesh shortly after the tournament before playing two games in England in August 2007. He took four wickets before being ruled out of the remainder of the series through injury. He was subsequently left out of the squad to play Pakistan in November although was recalled to the Test squad following injuries to R. P. Singh and S. Sreesanth.

=== 2011 World Cup ===
He was selected for the 2009 tour to Sri Lanka and played in the opening match. He bowled five wicketless overs for 32 runs. He then picked up a groin injury before the second match and was replaced in the squad by Lakshmipathy Balaji.

He was brought back into the ODI squad for India's last preparatory series before the 2011 World Cup, with the series taking place in South Africa. After India were beaten in the first match, they made only 190 when M. S. Dhoni chose to bat first in the second match. However, Patel put in a Man of the Match performance to return personal best figures of 4/29 off nine overs, taking the final wicket of Wayne Parnell to lead India to a 1-run victory, India's first against South Africa in South Africa since 2003. He was eventually named in India's World Cup squad. In India's first World Cup match against Bangladesh, Patel took four wickets, albeit with India defending a comfortable 370 run target. In the match against England, Patel's catch off his own bowling to dismiss Kevin Pietersen broke up an opening partnership in a match which England and India would eventually tie. He played an important role in the India Pakistan semi-final match at Mohali where he performed well and also played in the finals of the World Cup.

He last played for India on the 2011 tour of England.

== Coaching Career ==
He was appointed as Bowling coach for GMR Group based owned Delhi Capitals for the 2025 IPL. In 2025, he was appointed the new bowling coach of the Major League Cricket (MLC) team, Seattle Orcas.
