= Vagra Assembly constituency =

Legislative Assembly constituency in Gujarat State, India

Coordinates: 21.84°N 72.84°E

Vagra
- Constituency No. 151 for the Gujarat Legislative Assembly

Constituency details
- Country: India
- Region: Western India
- State: Gujarat
- District: Bharuch
- Lok Sabha constituency: Bharuch
- Established: 1951
- Total electors: 222,644
- Reservation: None

Member of Legislative Assembly
- 15th Gujarat Legislative Assembly
- Incumbent Arunsinh Rana
- Party: Bharatiya Janata Party
- Elected year: 2022

Vagra is one of the 182 Legislative Assembly constituencies of Gujarat state in India. It is part of Bharuch district.

== List of segments ==
This assembly seat represents the following segments,

1. Vagra Taluka
2. Bharuch Taluka (Part) : Villages – Adol, Aldar, Amdada

== Members of Legislative Assembly ==
- 1951-1952 - Ibrahim Ali Patel, Indian National Congress, Bombay Legislative Assembly

Year	Member	Picture	Party
2007	Iqbal Patel		Indian National Congress
2012	Arunsinh Ajitsinh Rana		Bharatiya Janata Party
2017	Arunsinh Ajitsinh Rana		Bharatiya Janata Party
2022	Arunsinh Ajitsinh Rana		Bharatiya Janata Party

== Election results ==
=== 2022 ===
Gujarat Legislative Assembly Election, 2022: Vagra
Party	Candidate	Votes	%	±%
BJP	Arunsinh Rana	83,036	51.84	
INC	Suleman Patel	69584	43.44	
AAP	Jayendrasinh Raj	1924	1.2	New
NOTA	None of the Above	2421	1.51	
Majority			8.4	
Turnout		160180		
Registered electors		217,064		
BJP hold		Swing		

=== 2017 ===
Gujarat Legislative Assembly Election, 2017: Vagra
Party	Candidate	Votes	%	±%
BJP	Arunsinh Rana			
NOTA	None of the Above			
Majority				
Turnout				

=== 2012 ===
Gujarat Assembly Election, 2012
Party	Candidate	Votes	%	±%
BJP	Arunsinh Rana	68512	51.13	
INC	Iqbal Patel	54194	40.45	
Majority		14318	10.69	
Turnout		133990	77.90	
BJP gain from INC		Swing		

== See also ==
- List of constituencies of Gujarat Legislative Assembly
- Gujarat Legislative Assembly
