= Gulf of Khambhāt =

Shallow gulf near Gujarat, India

Coordinates: 21°30′N 72°30′E

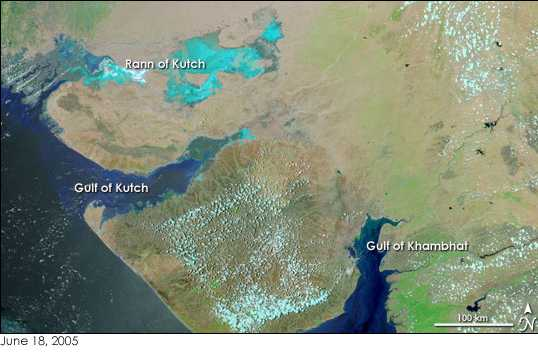
Gulf of Khambhat on the right. Image by the NASA Earth Observatory.

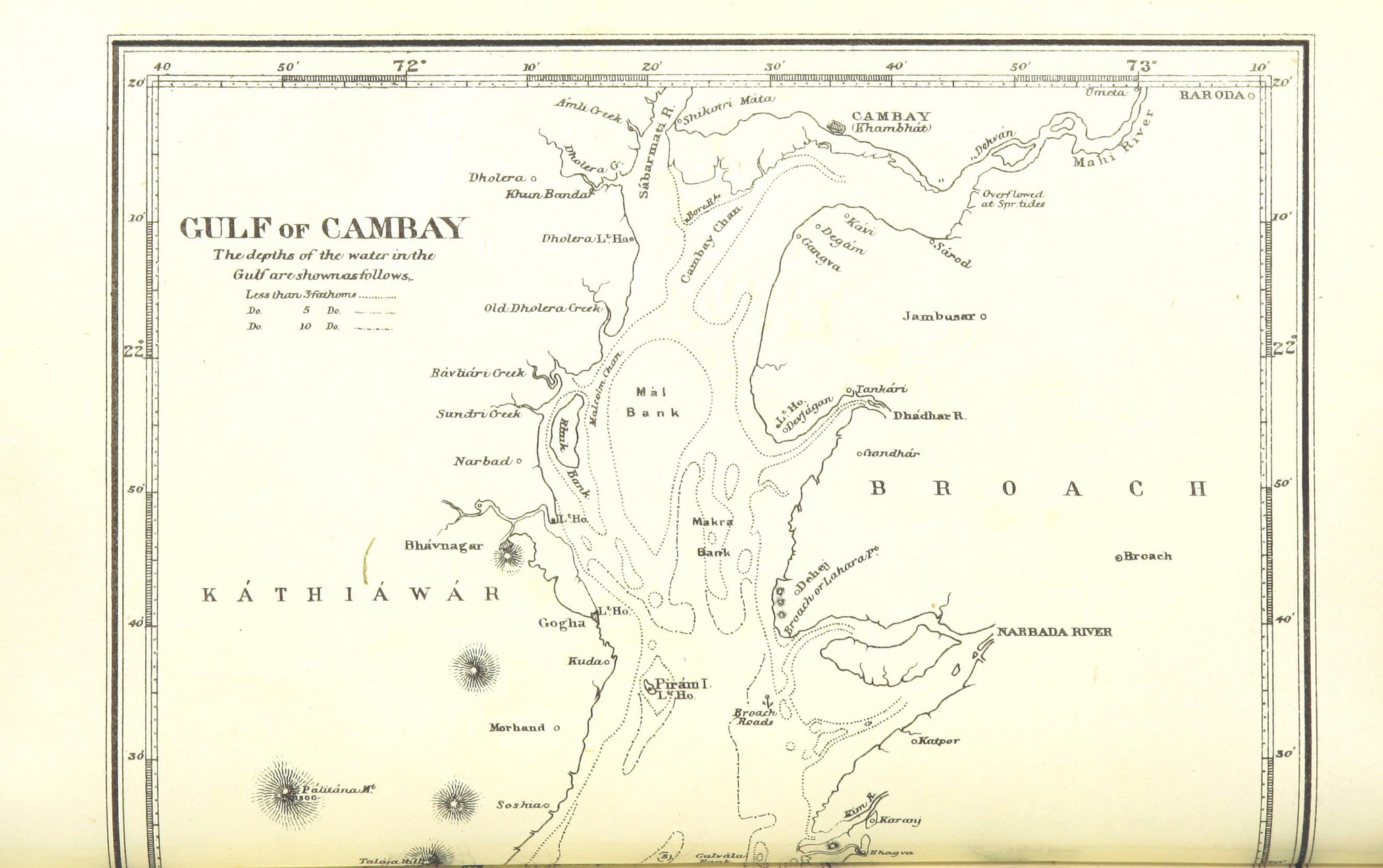
Gulf of Cambay (North part) 1896

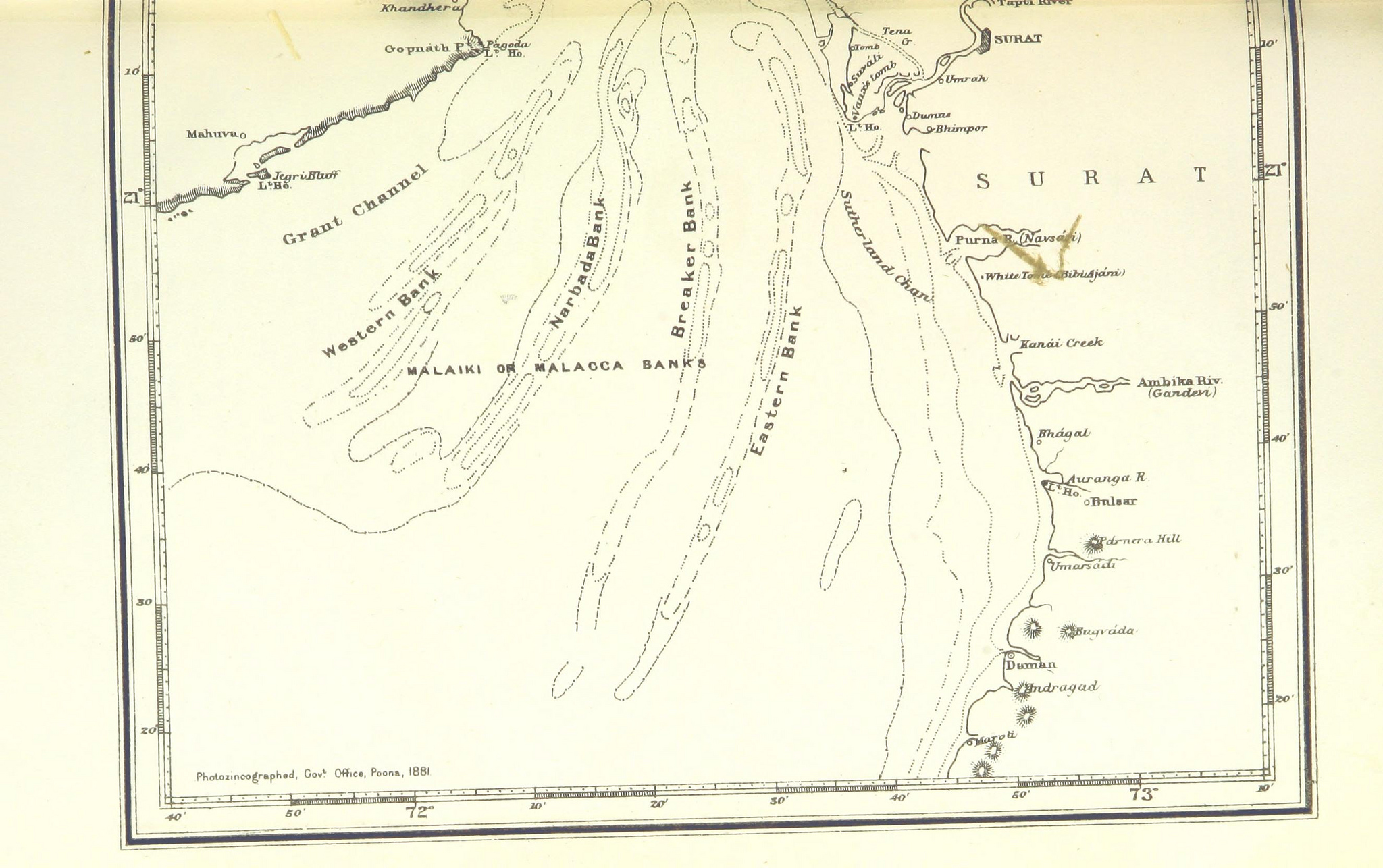
Gulf of Cambay (South part) 1896

The Gulf of Khambhāt (Gujarati: [kʰəmbʱat̪]), also known as the Gulf of Cambay, is a bay on the Arabian Sea coast of India, bordering the state of Gujarat, just north of Mumbai and the Diu Island. The Gulf of Khambhāt is about 200 km (120 mi) long, about 20 km (12 mi) wide in the north and up to 70 km (43 mi) wide in the south. Major rivers draining Gujarat are the Narmada, Tapti, Mahi and the Sabarmati, that form estuaries in the gulf.

It divides the Kathiawar Peninsula from the south-eastern part of Gujarat.

There are plans to construct a 60-kilometre (37 mi) dyke through the Kalpasar Project across the gulf.

== Wildlife ==
To the west of the Gulf, Asiatic lions inhabit the Gir Forest National Park and its surroundings, the region of Kathiawar or Saurashtra. To the east of the Gulf, the Dangs' Forest and Shoolpaneshwar Wildlife Sanctuary, where Gujarat meets Maharashtra and Madhya Pradesh, used to host Bengal tigers.

== See also ==
- Khambhat city
- Coral reefs in India
- Dumas Beach
- Gulf of Kutch
- Marine archaeology in the Gulf of Cambay
- Marine National Park, Gulf of Kutch
