= Bharuch =

- City
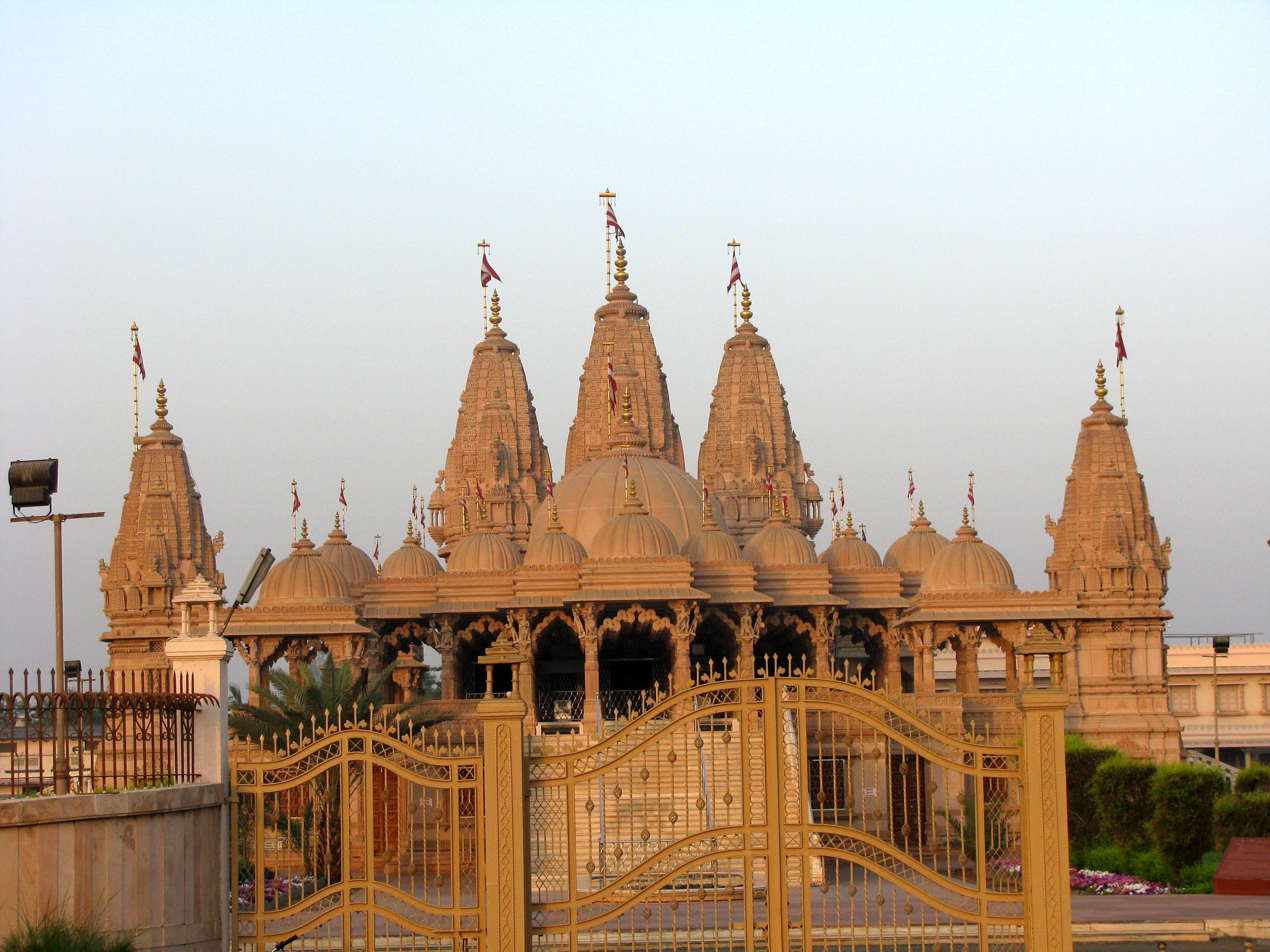
- BAPS Sri Svaminarayana Mandiram, Bharuch
- Nicknames: Peanut City, City of Fertilizers, Chemical Capital of India
- Location within Gujarat Location within India
- Coordinates: 21.712°N 72.993°E
- Country: India
- State: Gujarat
- District: Bharuch

Government
  - Type: Municipality
  - Body: Bharuch Municipality

Area
  - City: 43.80 km^{2} (16.91 sq mi)
- Elevation: 15 m (49 ft)

Population (2011)
  - City: 169,007
  - Density: 3,859/km^{2} (9,994/sq mi)
  - Metro: 223,647
- Demonym: Bharuchi
- Time zone: UTC+5:30 (IST)
- PIN: 392001, 392002, 392010, 392011, 392012, 392015
- Telephone code: 02642
- Vehicle registration: GJ16
- Website: bharuch.gujarat.gov.in

Bharuch is a city located at the mouth of the Narmada River in Gujarat in the western part of India. The city is the administrative headquarters of Bharuch District.

The city and its surroundings have been inhabited since antiquity. It was a shipbuilding centre and sea port in the pre-compass coastal trade routes for trading with the Occident and the East, perhaps as far back as the days of earliest trade connections. The route made use of the regular and predictable monsoon winds or relied on galleys. Many goods from the Far East and Far West (the famed Spices and Silk trade) were shipped there during the annual monsoon winds, making it a terminus for several key land-sea trade routes. Bharuch was known to the Greeks, the Parthian Empire, the Romans, the Chinese, and other Western and Eastern centres of civilisation through the end of the European Middle Ages and the corresponding medieval period elsewhere in the world.

The city has historically been home to the Gujarati Bhargava Brahmin community. The community traces its lineage to Bhrigu and Parashurama, who is the sixth avatar of Vishnu. The Bhargava community still administers a large number of public trusts in the city. However, the present day Bhargava Brahmanas have migrated to Mumbai, Surat, Vadodara, Ahmedabad and other countries such as France, Britain, Australia and New Zealand.

Being close to one of the biggest industrial areas including Ankleshvara GIDC, it is at times referred to as the chemical capital of India. The city has chemical plants, textile mills, long staple cotton, dairy products and much more. Gujarat's biggest liquid cargo terminal is situated 50 km to the west of Bharuch, in Dahej. It also houses many multinational companies, such as Videocon, BASF, ONGC Petro-Additions, Reliance Industries, Adani Ports & SEZ, Gujarat Narmada Valley Fertilisers & Chemicals, MRF Tires, Yokohama Off-Highway Tires, Jubilant, Aditya Birla Hindalco Industries, Gujarat Fluorochemicals Limited, ISGEC Hitachi, UPL (company), Gujarat Alkalies and Chemicals Limited, Deepak Nitrite, Torrent Pharmaceuticals, Petronet LNG, Godrej & Boyce, Piramal Group, Pidilite Industries, SRF Limited, Safari Equipments and Welspun Maxsteel Ltd. The industrial estate of Vilayata houses the companies of Aditya Birla Grasim, Kansai Nerolac Paints etc., Jhagadia houses DCM Sriram Chemicals, Saint-Gobain India Ltd., PepsiCo India Holdings Ltd. among others. Because of the distinctive colour of its soil (which is also ideal for cotton cultivation), Bharuch is sometimes referred to as 'Kanam Pradesham' (black-soil land). Bharuch is nicknamed 'Peanut City' due to its salted peanuts, locally known as 'Khari Sing'.

== Etymology ==
Bharuch was known as Bhrigukachchha (Bhrigukachha) or Bharukachchha (Bharukachha) in ancient times. According to local tradition, the name derives from the sage Bhrigu, whose temple stands on the Narmada riverbank in the Dandia Bazar area of the city.

It was known to the Greek and Roman writers as Barygaza, the name used in the first-century Periplus of the Erythraean Sea and later by Ptolemy. The Geography of Strabo contains the form Bargosa.

In British administrative usage, the town and its district were entered as Broach, a spelling that remained standard in official publications until independence.

== History ==
=== Ancient period ===
Around the sixth century BCE, Bharukachchha served as a western outlet for the trade routes of the kingdom of Avanti that was ruled from Ujjayini (modern-day Ujjain) by Chanda Pradyota Mahasena, a contemporary of Buddha.

Strabo records that a contingent of ambassadors that was sent to Caesar Augustus by an Indian king included Zarmanochegas, a man of Bargosa, who later burned himself alive at Athens.

By the first century CE, the port lay within the empire of the Western Satrap ruler Nahapana, whom the Periplus names as Manbanos and describes as ruling from Minnagara first and subsequently from Ujjain. The Periplus describes Barygaza as the region's principal port, reached through a difficult tidal estuary where royal pilots met incoming ships to guide them to the anchorage. The port's main imports were wine, copper, tin, lead, coral, textiles, raw glass, and gold and silver coin. Its main exports were nard, costus, bdellium, ivory, onyx, agate, cotton cloth, silk and long pepper. Goods reached the port by road from modern-day Ujjain as well as from Paithana (Paithan) and Tagara (Ter). The Periplus also reports that drachmas bearing the names of the rulers Menander and Apollodotus circulated at Barygaza. While it attributes old remains of shrines, fort walls, and wells to Alexander's expedition, that attribution remains contested as there are no records of Alexander having been in the area.

The Dipavamsa, a Sri Lankan Pali chronicle believed to have been compiled between the third and fourth century CE, names Bharukachchha among the western Indian ports at which the legendary prince Vijaya called before reaching Sri Lanka.

A map showing the ancient western trade routes serviced by this ancient and historical port. The gateway city of Bhrigukaccha is named on the map as Barigaza on the Gulf of Khambhat. The inhospitable mountains and deserts to the north of the Erythraean Sea underscore its importance in trade with ancient Axum, Egypt, Arabia and the sea-land trade routes via the Mesopotamian plains with Ancient Greece and Ancient Rome.

=== Medieval period (c. 500 CE to c. 1500 CE) ===
In the sixth or seventh century CE, the region around the city, then known as Lata, was ruled by Gurjara chiefs. The seventh century Chinese pilgrim Xuanzang recorded the city under the name Po-lu-ka-che-p’o.

The region around the city was then ruled by the Chalukyas in the late seventh century CE. Arab forces from Sindh under Al-Junayd of the Umayyad Caliphate raided the town in the early eighth century CE. The Chalukyas were subsequently supplanted by the Rashtrakutas in the early eighth century CE. In the middle of the eighth century CE, the region around Bharuch was ruled by a Chahamana family allied with king Nagabhata I, who founded the Pratihara dynasty.

=== Portuguese empire ===
The Battle of Bharuch was a night-time attack by Portuguese forces under the command of Jorge de Meneses Baroche in 1547 against the city, then belonging to the Sultanate of Gujarat. The Portuguese were victorious.

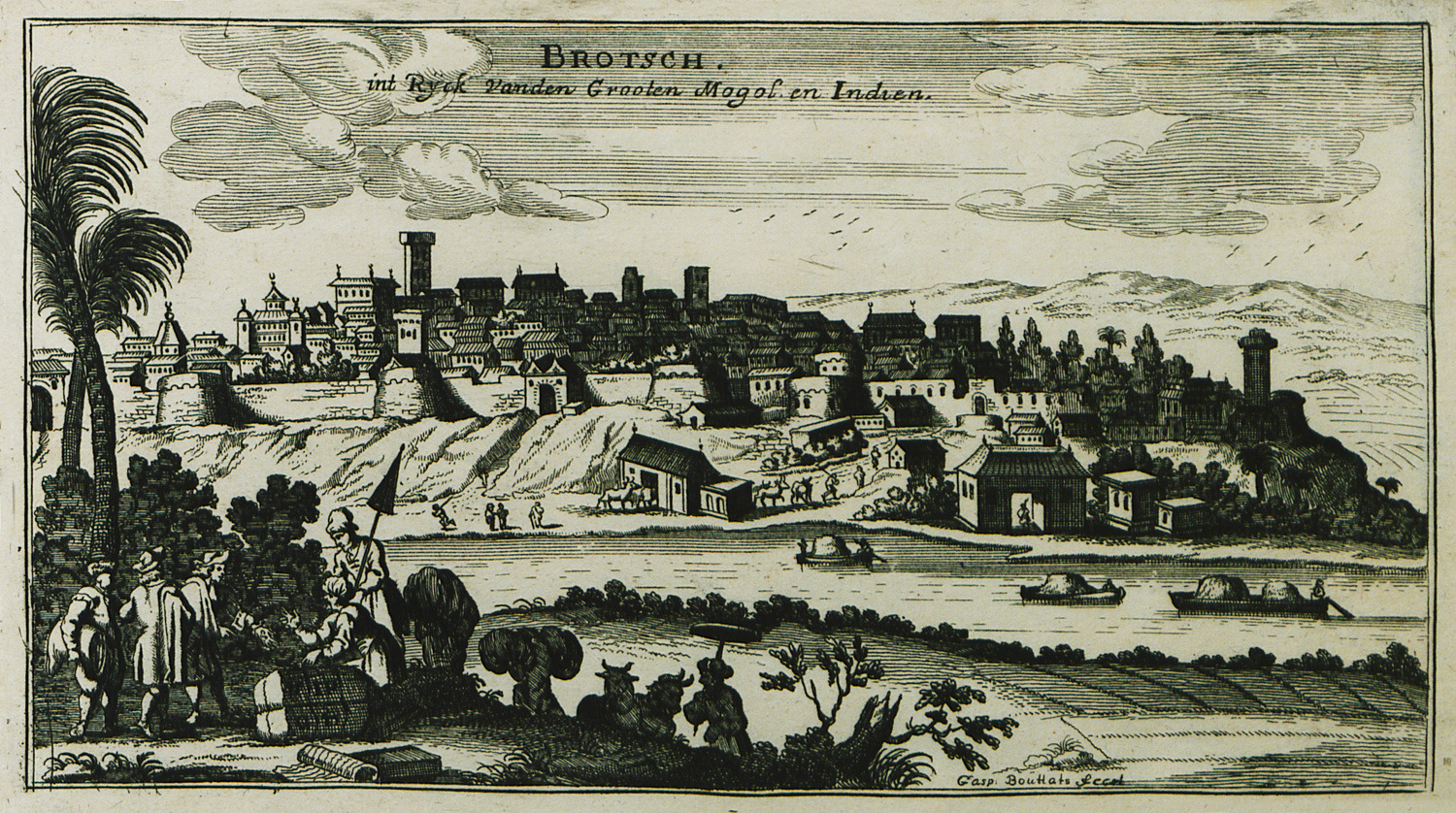
"Bharuch", by Peeters Jacob, 1690 CE.

=== Nawabs of Bharuch and the Maratha Empire ===
The Nawabs of Bharuch ruled this region of Gujarat, and in 1685, they came under the suzerainty of the Maratha Empire, governed by the Peshwa. In 1736, the Royal House of Bharuch became sovereign, ruling the region independently. During this era, Bharuch was known for its cotton production, which caused the East India Company to set its eyes on the area. In 1771, Bharuch was attacked by the British and on 18 November 1772, it was placed under Company rule in India. The ruling family of Bharuch was granted a hereditary pension by the British government.

== Geography and climate ==
Bharuch is located at 21.7°N 72.97°E. It has an average elevation of 15 metres (49 feet). Bharuch, a former port, is situated on the banks of the Narmada River. The damming of the Narmada led to the closure of the city's original port facilities; the nearest port is now at Dahej. The city lies in Bharuch district, which is bordered by Vadodara district to the north, Narmada district to the east, and Surat district to the south with the Gulf of Khambhat to the west.

Under the Köppen climate classification, Bharuch has a tropical savanna climate moderated strongly by the Arabian Sea. The summer begins in early March and lasts until June. April and May are the hottest months, with average maximum temperatures of about 40 °C (104 °F). The South Asian monsoon begins in late June, and the district receives about 800 millimetres (31 in) of rain by the end of September, with average maximum temperatures of about 32 °C (90 °F) during those months. October and November see the retreat of the monsoon and a brief return of high temperatures until late November. Winter starts in December and ends in late February, with average temperatures of around 23 °C (73 °F).

Heavy monsoon rain often brings flooding to the Narmada basin area. Bharuch has experienced major floods, most recently in 2023, though flooding has been largely controlled since the damming of the Narmada.

== Economy, commerce and industry ==
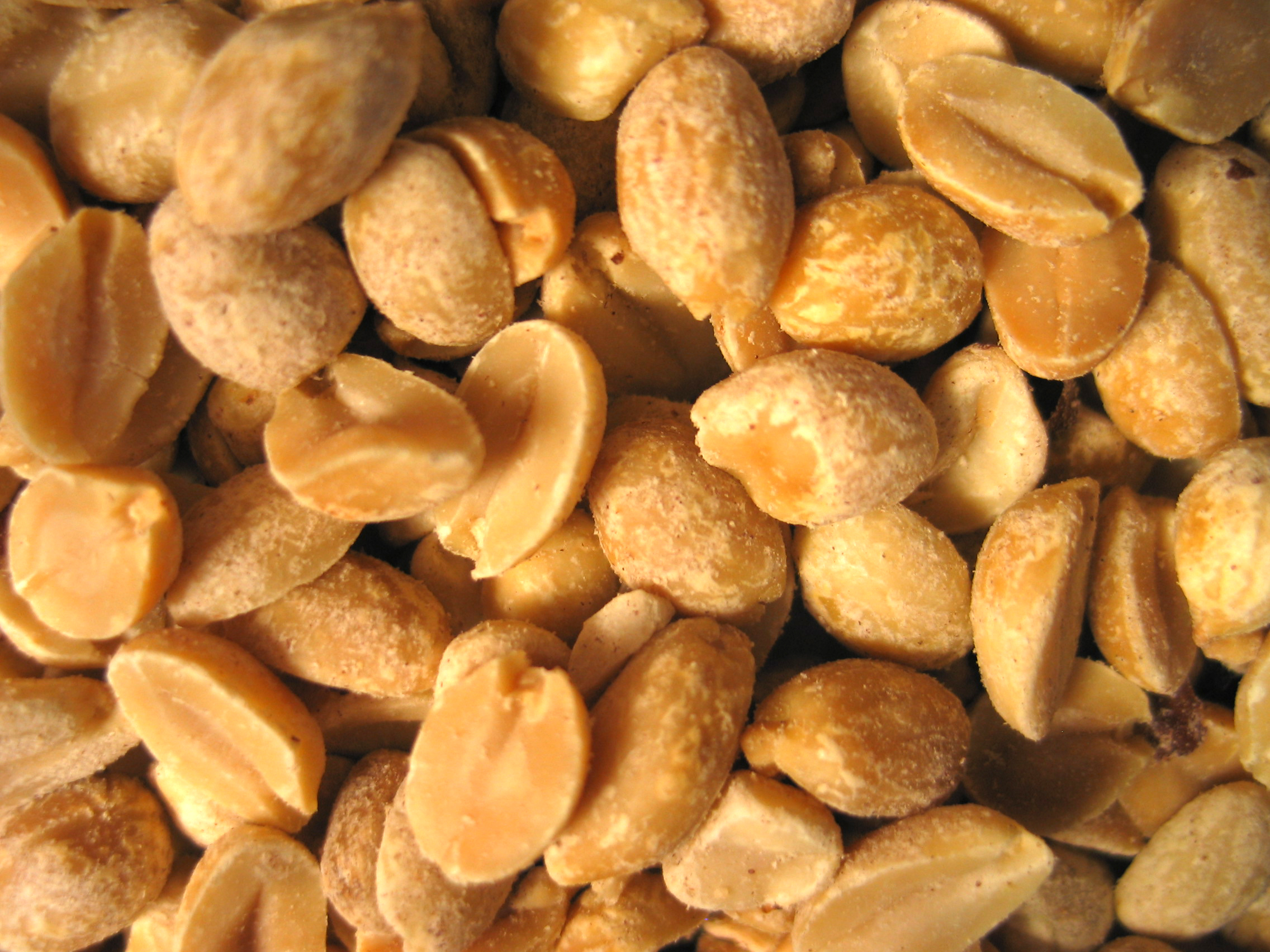
Salty peanuts

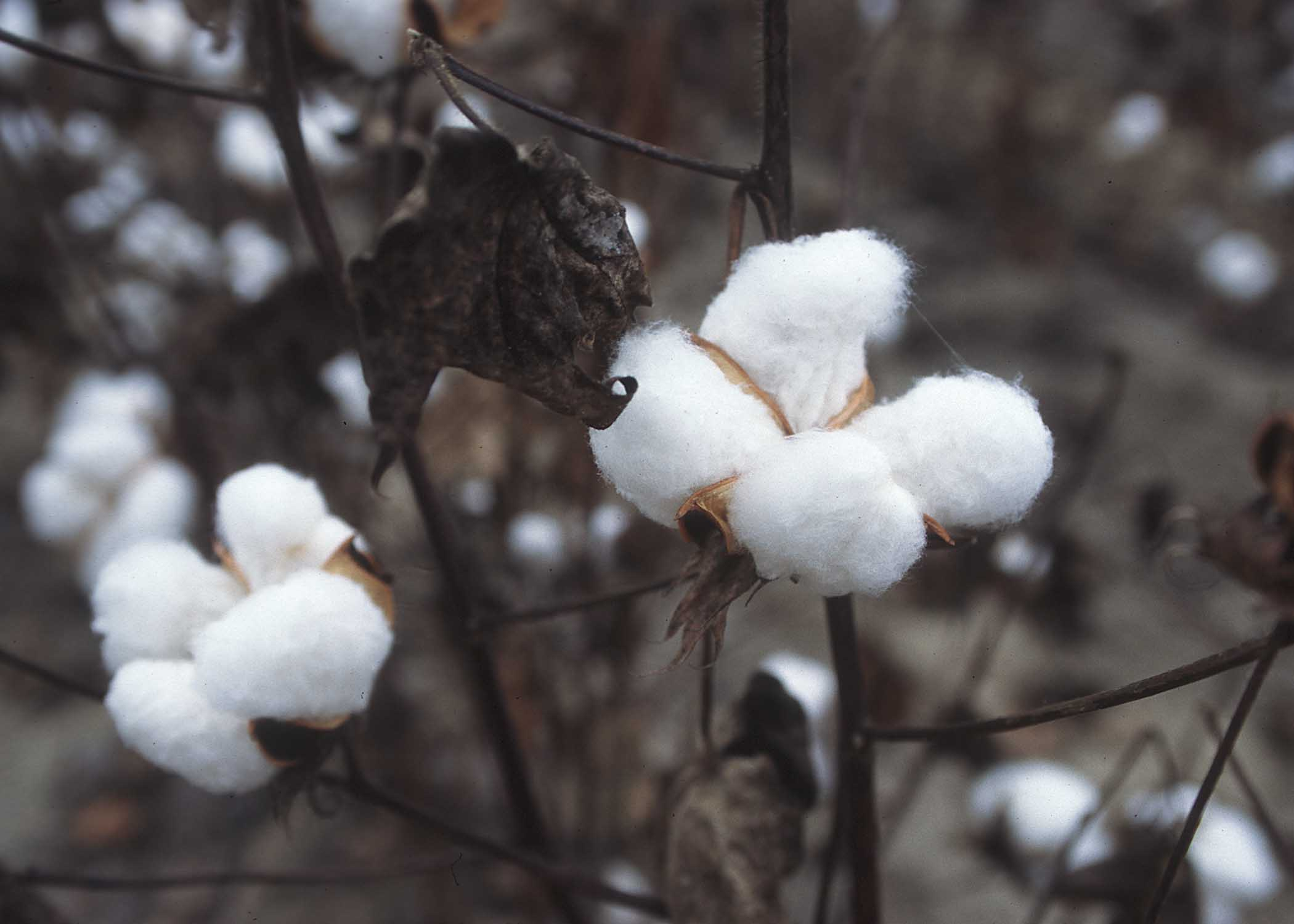
Cotton

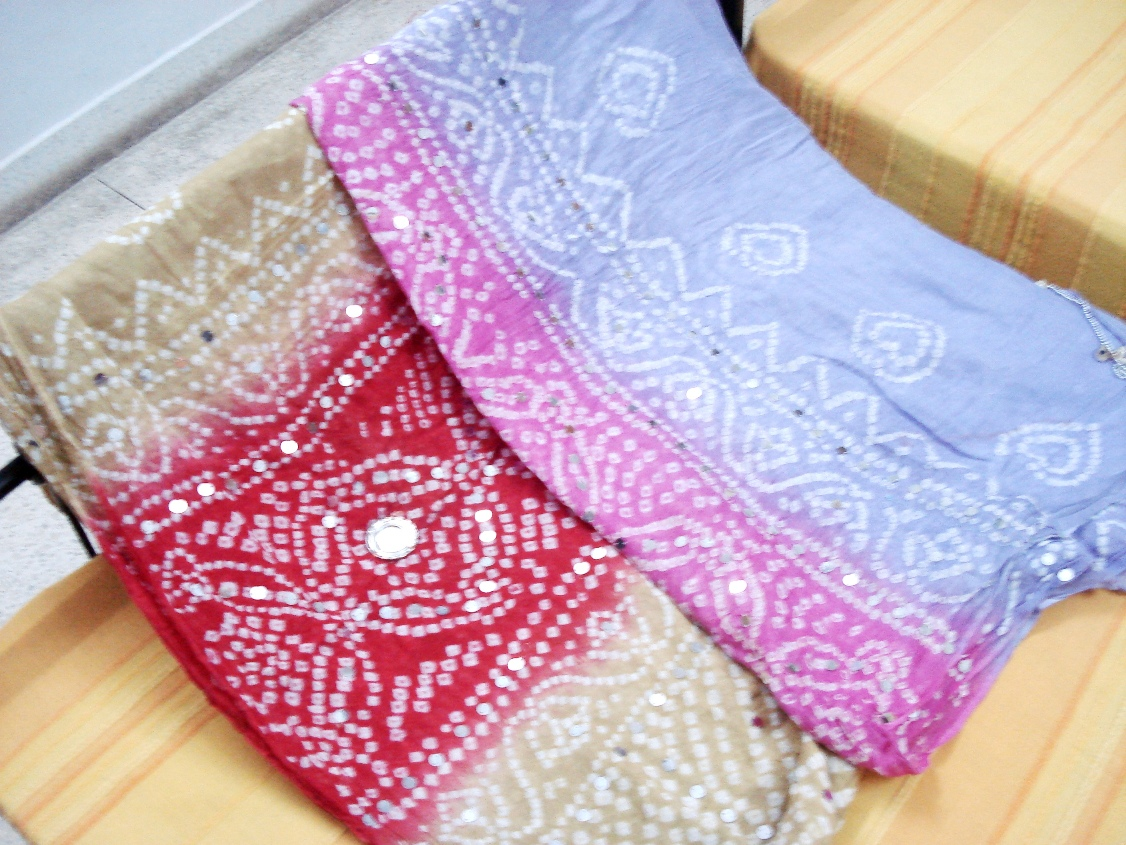
Bandhni

Bharuch's historical prosperity has been attributed to its location on the Narmada River. Although water tends to be scarce in Gujarat, water availability in Bharuch has historically been reliable, allowing agriculture and related commercial activities to flourish. Bharuch is also a central stopping point for many villages surrounding its boundaries: people from smaller settlements often come to Bharuch for shopping or major purchases. In recent years, many retiring expatriates have returned to Bharuch and built new houses, giving the local economy a boost.

Traditionally, Bharuch has been the centre of the peanut-processing and marketing industry, with a well-established brand name across India. Almost none of the peanuts are grown locally, but the best crops from neighbouring regions are brought here for processing. Bharuch is also the home of the Bandhni method of clothing design and is well known for this traditional art form.

At present, this heavily industrialised area is renowned for its textile mills, chemical plants, long-staple cotton, dairy products, and more. Gujarat's biggest liquid cargo terminal is situated here. It also houses many reputed multinational companies such as Videocon, BASF, Reliance, Welspun Stahl, etc. Bharuch is a shopping centre noted for its salty peanuts. Because of the distinctive colour of its soil, which is ideal for cotton cultivation, Bharuch is sometimes referred to as 'Kanam Pradesh' (black-soil land).

Over the past 60 years, a major part of the population has moved to countries such as the UK, the US, the African nations, and parts of Europe. This migration continues to boost the local economy, as people return for vacations and spend their earnings locally.

=== Trade ===
Bharuch was a major seaport in the important pre-compass coastal trading routes to points west, perhaps as far back as the days of the Pharaohs, which utilised the regular and predictable monsoon winds or galleys. Many goods from the Far East were trans-shipped here during the annual monsoon winds, making Bharuch a terminus for several key land-sea trade routes. Bharuch was known to the Greeks, the Persian Empires, the Roman Republic and Empire, and other Western centres of civilisation through the end of the European Middle Ages.

In the 1st century AD, Bharuch port was mentioned as Barigaza. Bharuch, then a prosperous and powerful port, remained an important part of Gujarat until the 16th century. Arab traders entered Gujarat via Bharuch. British, Dutch ("Valandas"), and others recognised Bharuch's importance and established premises and local staff here. At the end of the 17th century, the city was plundered twice, but resurged quickly, giving rise to the proverb, "Bhangyu Bhangyu Toye Bharuch".

As a trading depot, the limitations of coastal shipping made Bharuch a regular terminus alongside several mixed trade routes of the famed spice and silk trade between East and West.

The Narmada River's inland access to central and northern India, combined with Bharuch's sheltered position on the Gulf of Khambhat during an era of coastal sea travel, allowed the city to grow and prosper as a transshipment centre and shipbuilding port. Until modern times, water transport was the most effective means of moving goods, and Bharuch offered sheltered waters in an era without weather forecasting or compasses, when navigating was limited to coastal routes. The east–west course of the Narmada gave access to inland empires at its upper reaches, including caravan routes to the Ganges valley and the plains of Delhi.

Between 1500 and 1700, Bharuch was a major textile-manufacturing hub. The city was famous for its bafta, a textile valued in the West and Southeast Asian markets. Bafta cloth was among the leading textile products exported to Europe and other parts of the world.

=== Present industrial city ===
Modern Bharuch is one of the most heavily industrialised areas, not only in Gujarat but in India as a whole, with many large chemical plants producing fertilisers, paints, dyes, cotton, textiles, and dairy products.

Bharuch also has Gujarat's biggest liquid cargo terminal. A very large fertiliser and chemical company, GNFC Ltd., has been located in Narmadanagar (a suburb of Bharuch) since 1976.

Large Indian and multinational companies, such as the Torrent Group, PepsiCo International, Guardian Corporation, Hitachi, Heubach Colors, Zydus Cadila, Cadila Health Care, Survival Technologies, Videocon, China Light and Power, BASF, Reliance, Tata Group, Aditya Birla Group, Welspun Stahl, Aventis, Gulbrandsen Technologies, Wockhardt, Rallis, Pfizer, Ciba, L&T, Bayer, Glenmark, UPL, Lupin, J B Chemicals, Gujarat Fluorochemicals, NTPC, ONGC, GAIL, OPaL Solvay, Breeze Intermediates, Alliance Tyre Group, Firmenich, Astra Specialty Compounds, and GPEC have set up manufacturing units in and around Bharuch and Ankleshwar.

Petronet LNG Ltd has established the country's first LNG receiving and regasification terminal at Dahej, an industrial area with companies such as ONGC, GNFC, Alliance Tyre Group, ABG Shipyard, First carbon, Indofil, Birla copper, Adani, Reliance.

== Demographics ==
As of the 2011 India census, Bharuch had a population of 148,391. Males constitute 52% of the population and females 48%. Bharuch has an average literacy rate of 97.06%, much higher than the national average of 74%, with male literacy at 98.5% and female literacy at 95.5%. About 10% of the population is under 6 years of age.

== Culture ==
As Bharuch is a renowned tirtha, also known as Bhrigu Tirtha in many of the Hindu Puranas, it hosts a large number of temples along the riverside. There are also a number of mosques in the city including the Jami Masjid, built in 1644 during the reign of Shah Jahan.

== Notable people ==
Mythological figures related to Bharuch include Bhrigu Rishi, Shukra, Chyavana, Chandra, Dattatreya, Durvasa, Vamana, Mahabali, Jamadagni and Parshurama, and the first mystic who self-immolated himself in Athens, Zarmanochegas. Notable historical figures include King Nahapana.

Notable people from recent times include:

- Godrej family, including Ardeshir Godrej and Pirojsha Burjorji Godrej, co-founders of the Godrej Group
- Kanaiyalal Maneklal Munshi (1887–1971), Indian independence movement activist, politician, writer and educationist
- Feroze Gandhi (1912–1960), Indian politician and journalist, husband of Prime Minister Indira Gandhi
- Ahmed Patel (1949–2020), senior leader of the Indian National Congress
- Cyrus Broacha (born 1971), Indian television personality, ancestors were from Bharuch
- Omkarnath Thakur (1897–1967), Indian educator, musicologist, and Hindustani classical singer
- Premchand Roychand (1831–1906), Indian businessman and merchant, founder of the Bombay Stock Exchange
- Tribhuvandas Luhar (1908–1991), Gujarati writer
- Shapurji Broacha (1845–1920), Indian industrialist and philanthropist, sheriff of Bombay during George V's coronation in India
- Ibrahim Ali Patel, politician

Broacha and Bharucha are common surnames among Parsis and Dawoodi Bohras originally from Bharuch.

== Places of interest ==
=== Bharuch City ===
- Bhrigu Rishi Temple. The temple of Bhrigu Rishi, one of the famous and sacred temples of Gujarat, is situated on the eastern side of the city in Dandia Bazar area on the banks of the holy river Narmada. This temple, visited by many pilgrims, has religious importance to the people of Bharuch. Bharuch, which was originally called 'Bhrigukachchha', derived its name from this temple. The temple was built in honour of the great saint Maharishi Bhrigu, who was able to attain sainthood by reaching the perfect balance between wisdom and activity. It was here that Bhrigu Rishi wrote the first Indian astrological work, the Bhrigu Samhita. He is said to have documented five million horoscopes, recording the fate of every being in the universe.
- Nav Nathas. There are nine Swayambhu (self-manifested) Shivalingas located at different places in old Bharuch city. These Shivalingas are known as the Nav Naths in Bharuch. They are Kamnath, Jwalnath, Somnath, Bhimnath, Gangnath, Bhootnath, Pingalnath, Siddhnath and Kashi Vishwanath. These nine shivlingas are said to have existed since time immemorial. It was because of these shivlingas that Bhrigu Rishi chose Bharuch for his ashram.
- Temples are found throughout the city, and each holds its own religious significance. The Swaminarayan Temple in Dandia Bazar area of the city is 175 years old and hosts a palette of colour on its walls. Narmada Mata Temple, also in Dandia Bazar, is 150 years old and dedicated to Goddess Narmada. The Vaishnav Haveli enshrines an idol of Bal Krishna said to have come from Mathura in 1725. Behind the old Civil Hospital, the Khodiyar Mata Temple overlooks the low-lying area of Furja and offers one of the best views of sunset in the city.
- Gurudwara Chadar Saheb. In the 15th century, Guru Nanak Dev, the first Sikh Guru, visited Bharuch. It is believed that when a boatman refused to take him across the Narmada, he crossed the river on a cloth sheet, or chadar. The Gurudwara was later constructed in Kasak area, on the site where he landed in Bharuch.

=== Surrounding area ===
- Shuklatirth is situated at a distance of about 12 km (7.5 mi) east of Bharuch is a host of many old temples. The most famous of them is Shukleshwar Mahadev Temple. Legend says that Shiva was pleased with the devout Chanakya and guided him to salvation. He instructed Chanakya to start his journey in a black boat at the mouth of the Narmada dressed in black and accompanied by a black cow. The place where black would transform into white would mark the location of his liberation. The transformation occurred in Shuklatirth. Shiva stayed with Chanakya at this site in the form of a linga. It is believed that this temple houses that same linga, and that by praying here all sins are purged and desires fulfilled. The Omkarnath Vishnu Mandir has a tall white idol of Vishnu said to have emerged from the Narmada. This idol is made up of sand (it is a self manifested idol), but it appears as if it is made from marble.
- Kabirvad is the island of banyan trees. Kabirvad is an island on the river Narmada at a distance of about 16 km (10 mi) east of Bharuch city. The main attraction here is a gigantic banyan tree covering an area of more than 2.5 acres. According to legends, it is at this place that saint Kabirdas meditated and the tree grew from a meswak stick (used for brushing the teeth) that was thrown here by the saint. A single tree has over the years proliferated into a tree with several trunks and spread in over 2.5 acres of land. Other added attractions here are the lotus shaped marble temple, Kabir museum and boat ride on Narmada river.

==== Other places of interest ====
- Stambheshwar Mahadev – Kavi Kamboi (45 kilometres (28 miles) from Bharuch) at the estuary of the Mahi River. This Shivalinga is flooded at high tides; not during low tides.

== See also ==
- Bharucha
- Ankleshwar
- Bafta cloth

== Sources ==
- Watters, Thomas (1905), On Yuan Chwang's Travels in India, vol. II, London: Royal Asiatic Society
- Chisholm, Hugh (1910), Encyclopaedia Britannica., vol. IV, Bisharin to Calgary (11th ed.), New York: The Encyclopaedia Britannica Company
- Law, Bimala Churn (1932), Geography of Early Buddhism (PDF), London: Kegan Paul, Trench, Trubner & Co. Ltd.
- Raychaudhari, Hemchandra (1950), Political History of Ancient India (Fifth ed.), University of Calcutta
- Agrawala, V.S. (1953), India as Known to Panini, University of Lucknow
- Majmudar, M.R. (1960), History and Cultural Chronology of Gujarat, Maharaja Sayajirao University of Baroda Press
- Majumdar, R.C. (1970), The History and Culture of the Indian People, vol. 3. The Classical Age (Third ed.), Bombay: Bharatiya Vidya Bhavan
- Casson, Lionel (1989), The Periplus Maris Erythraei: Text with Introduction, Translation, and Commentary, Princeton University Press
- Sen, Sailendra Nath (1994). Anglo-Maratha relations during the administration of Warren Hastings 1772-1785. Popular Prakashan. ISBN 978-81-7154-578-0.
- Oldenberg, Hermann (2006) [1879], The Dipavamsa: The Ancient Buddhist Historical Record (4th Reprint ed.), New Delhi: Asian Educational Services
