= Bharuch district =

- District of Gujarat
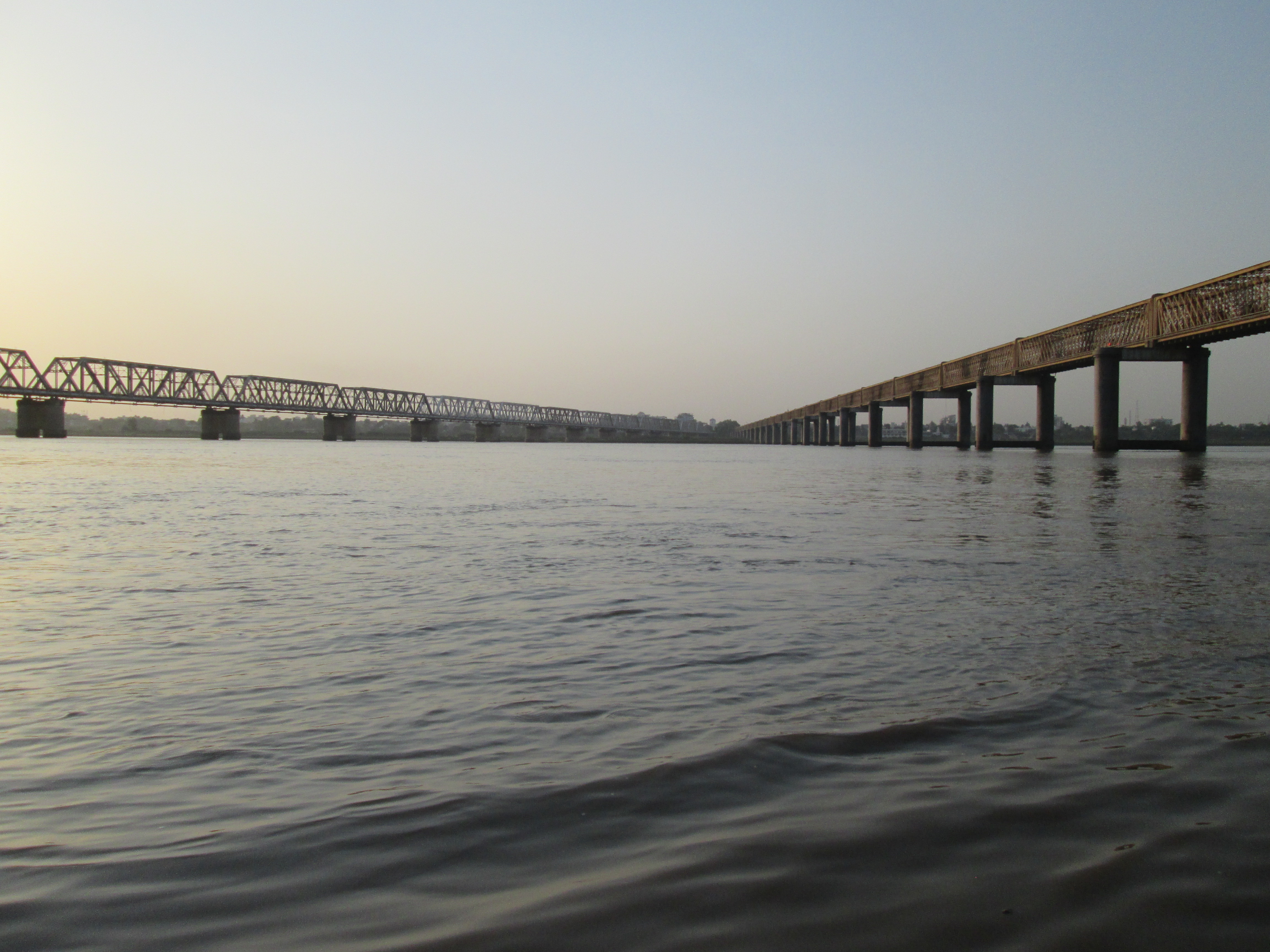
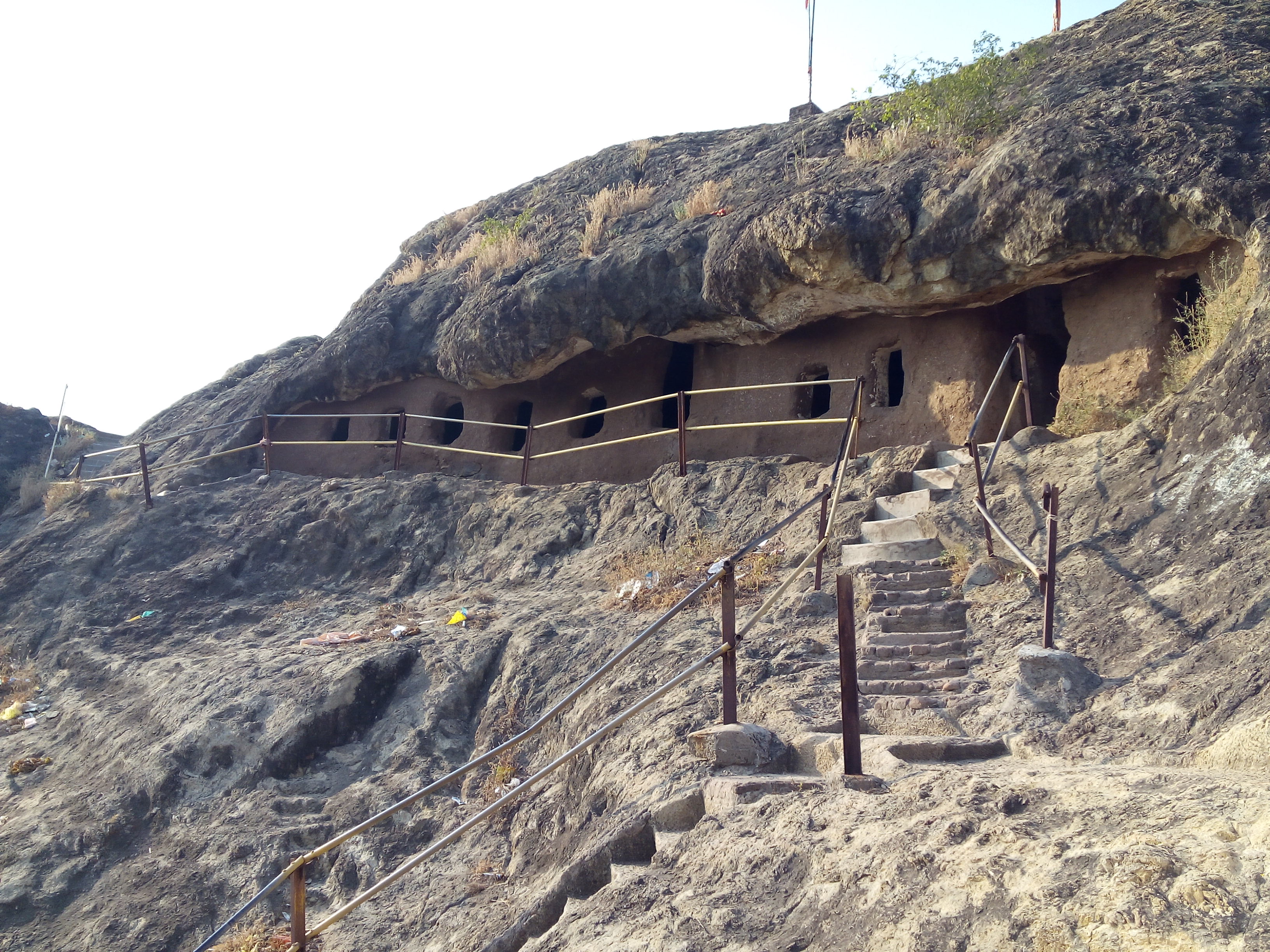
- Top: Golden and Silver bridges over the Narmada in Bharuch; Bottom: Kadia Dungar Caves

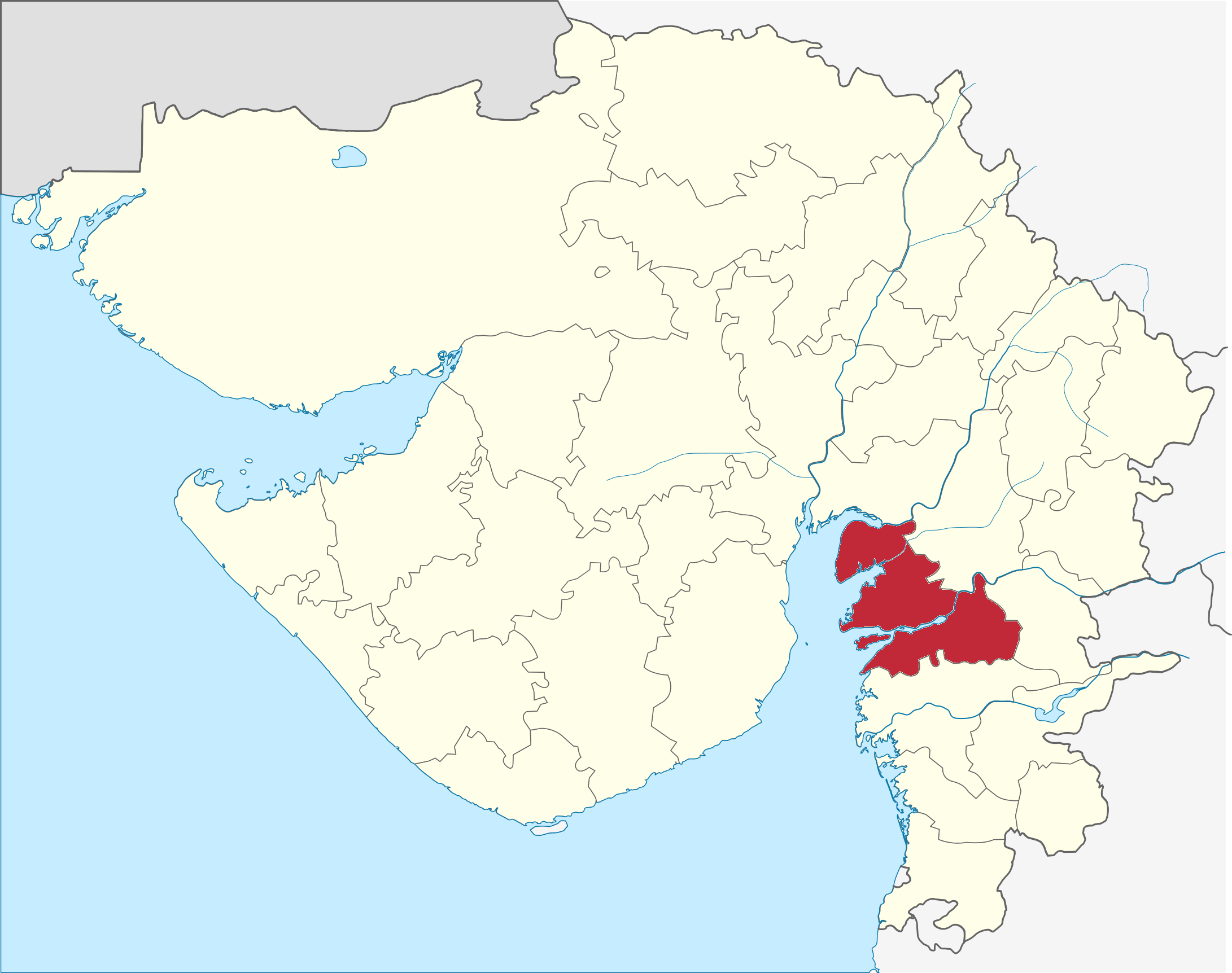
- Location in Gujarat
- Interactive map of Bharuch district
- Coordinates: 20°42′N 72°59′E
- Country: India
- State: Gujarat
- Headquarters: Bharuch

Government
  - Type: Municipality
  - Body: District Government of Bharuch

Area
  - Total: 6,509 km^{2} (2,513 sq mi)

Population (2011)
  - Total: 1,551,019
  - Density: 238.3/km^{2} (617.2/sq mi)

Languages
  - Official: Gujarati, Hindi, English
- Time zone: UTC+5:30 (IST)
- Vehicle registration: GJ-16
- Website: bharuch.nic.in

Bharuch in India, is a district in the southern regions of the Kathiawar peninsula on the west coast of the state of Gujarat in the Arabian sea with a size and population comparable to that of Greater Boston. The district headquarters is Bharuch.

Bharuch derives its name from the famous Hindu sage Bhrigu. A historical name for Bharuch is Bhrigukachchha. The mythological sage Bhrigu is one of the many children of Brahma and Sarasvati. There is also a story which indicates that Bhrigu along with his kin asked for temporary access to Bharuch which was said to belong to Lakshmi, since Bharuch is located on the banks of river Narmada also known as Rudra Deha. Chandramaulishvara, a form of Shiva is the Kuladevata of the Hindu Bhargavas of Bharuch. Bhrigu never left the place and the Ashrama of the sage Brighu is located on the banks of the Narmada river. The Narmada River outlets into the Gulf of Khambhat through its lands and that shipping artery gave inland access to the kingdoms and empires located all over the Indian subcontinent.

== History ==
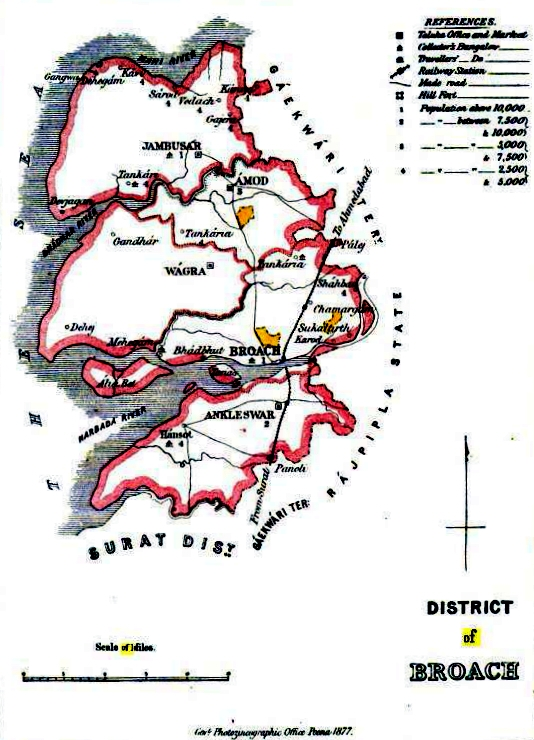
Map of Bharuch district, Mumbai Presidency, British India, 1877

The city of Bharuch and its surrounds—today's district—has been settled far back into antiquity and was a major shipping building centre and sea port in the important pre-compass coastal trading routes to points to the Far West, perhaps as far back as the days of the Pharaohs, which used the regular and predictable Monsoon winds or galleys. Many goods from the Far East (the famed Spice and Silk trade) were trans-shipped there for the annual monsoon winds making it a terminus for several key land-sea trade routes and Bharuch was definitely known to the Greeks, the Parthians and in the Eastern Roman Empire and the Western Romans and other Western and Eastern centres of civilisations right on through the end of the European Middle Ages.

With the advent of the European Age of Discovery, the presence of deep draft sea going shipping, it began a long slow decline in importance as it was a bit too far north to be convenient to shipping not confined to keeping within sight of shore.

== Divisions ==
Administratively, it contains the tehsils (administrative subdistricts) of Bharuch, Ankleshwar, Hansot, Jambusar, Zaghadia, Amod, Vagra. It also contains the city of Bharuch.

== Demographics ==
Historical population
Year	Pop.	±% p.a.
1901	321,528	—
1911	368,466	+1.37%
1921	374,101	+0.15%
1931	423,980	+1.26%
1941	506,264	+1.79%
1951	558,930	+0.99%
1961	684,166	+2.04%
1971	841,048	+2.09%
1981	970,172	+1.44%
1991	1,148,252	+1.70%
2001	1,370,656	+1.79%
2011	1,551,019	+1.24%

Religions in Bharuch district (2011)
Hinduism	76.61%
Islam	22.15%
Christianity	0.61%
Other or not stated	0.63%
Distribution of religions

According to the 2011 census of India, Bharuch district has a population of 1,551,019, roughly equal to the nation of Gabon or the United States's Hawaii state. This gives it a ranking of 321st in India (out of a total of 640). The district has a population density of 238 inhabitants per square kilometre (620/sq mi). Its population growth rate over the decade 2001–2011 was 13.14%. Bharuch has a sex ratio of 924 females for every 1000 males, and a literacy rate of 83.03%. 33.85% of the population lived in urban areas. Scheduled Castes and Scheduled Tribes made up 4.01% and 31.48% of the population respectively.

Languages of Bharuch district (2011)
1. Gujarati (90.0%)
2. Hindi (6.30%)
3. Marathi (1.13%)
4. Urdu (0.57%)
5. Others (1.99%)

At the time of the 2011 census of India, 90.02% of the population in the district spoke Gujarati, 6.30% Hindi, 1.13% Marathi. and 0.57% Urdu as their first language.

== Politics ==
District	No.	Constituency	Name	Party	Remarks
Bharuch District	150	Jambusar	Devkishordas Swami	Bharatiya Janata Party	
Bharuch District	151	Vagra	Arunsinh Rana	Bharatiya Janata Party	
Bharuch District	152	Jhagadiya (ST)	Ritesh Vasava	Bharatiya Janata Party	
Bharuch District	153	Bharuch	Ramesh Mistry	Bharatiya Janata Party	
Bharuch District	154	Ankleshwar	Ishwarsinh Patel	Bharatiya Janata Party	

== Notable personalities ==
- Abdulahad Malik, cricketer in IPL, born in Hansot.
- Adam Patel, Baron Patel of Blackburn, Member of UK House of Lords, born in Bharuch.
- Ahmed Patel, Indian parliamentarian for the Indian National Congress, born in Piraman, Ankaleshvara.
- Professor Alimuddin Zumla, Medic at University College London
- Balwantray Thakore (1869–1952), Poet. Born in Bharuch.
- Farooq Shaikh, Actor, TV presenter and philanthropist. His ancestral village is Hansot.
- Kanaiyalal Maneklal Munshi (1887–1971) Indian independence movement activist, politician, writer and educationist. Born in the city of Bharuch.
- Munaf Patel, Indian cricketer of the Indian national cricket team.
- Prabodh Dinkarrao Desai, Acting Governor of Himachal Pradesh and Chief Justice of various High Courts of India.
- Kshitij R. Vyas, Chief Justice of the Mumbai High Court.
- Rashid Patel, former Indian cricketer.
- Tribhuvandas Luhar (1908–1991), Poet. Born in Miyamatar.

== See also ==
- Kalpasar Project
- 3rd Narmada Bridge
- Vora Samni
