= Death of Alexander the Great =

Death of the Macedonian king in 323 BC

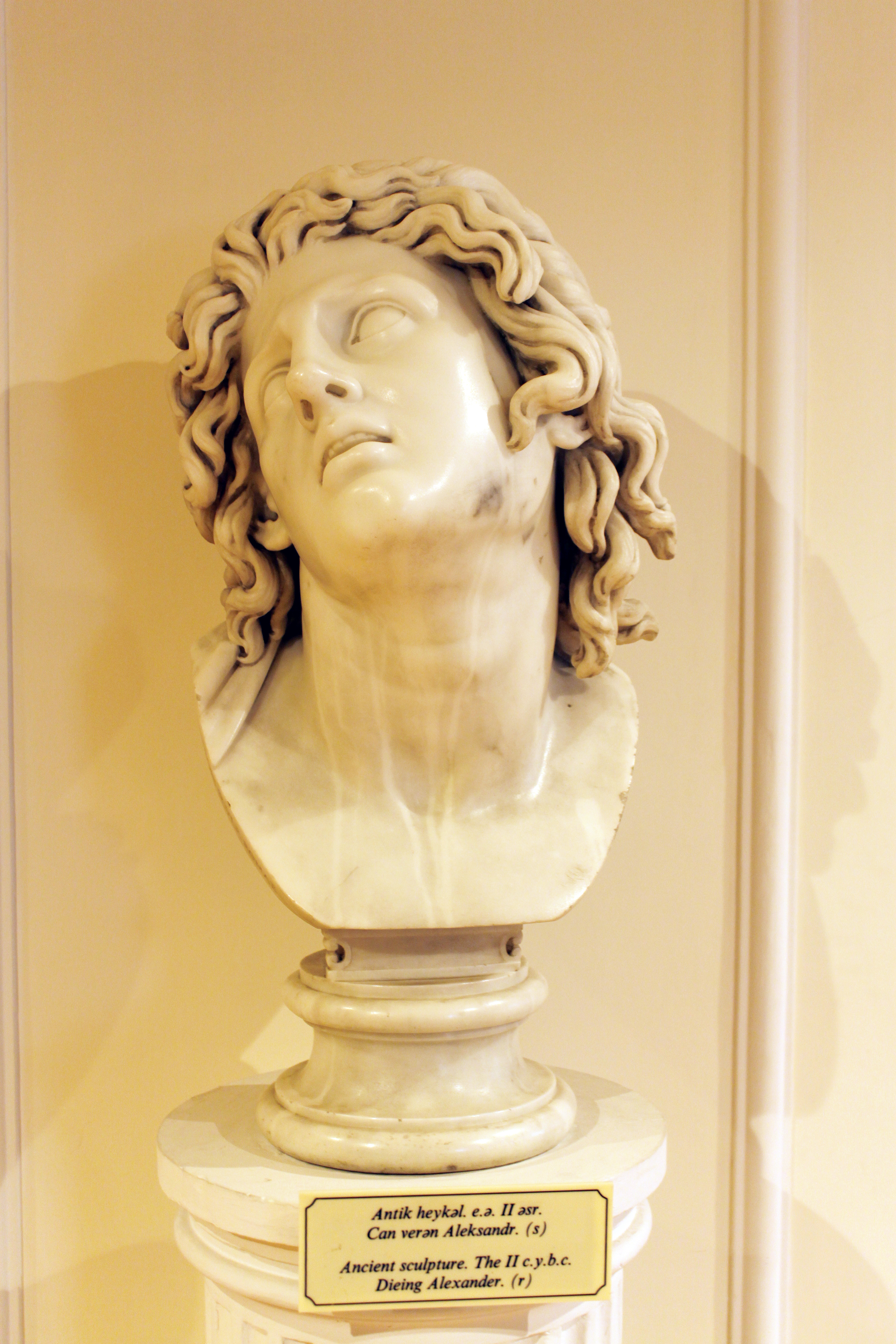
Dying Alexander, copy of a 2nd-century BC sculpture, National Art Museum of Azerbaijan.

According to a Babylonian astronomical diary, Alexander the Great died in the palace of Nebuchadnezzar II in Babylon between the evening of 10 June and the evening of 11 June 323 BCE, at the age of 32. The death of Alexander the Great and subsequent related events have been the subjects of debates for millennia.

Macedonians and local residents wept at the news of the death, while Achaemenid subjects were forced to shave their heads. The mother of Darius III, Sisygambis, having learned of Alexander's death, became depressed and killed herself later. Historians vary in their assessments of primary sources about Alexander's death, which has resulted in different views about its cause and circumstances.

== Background ==
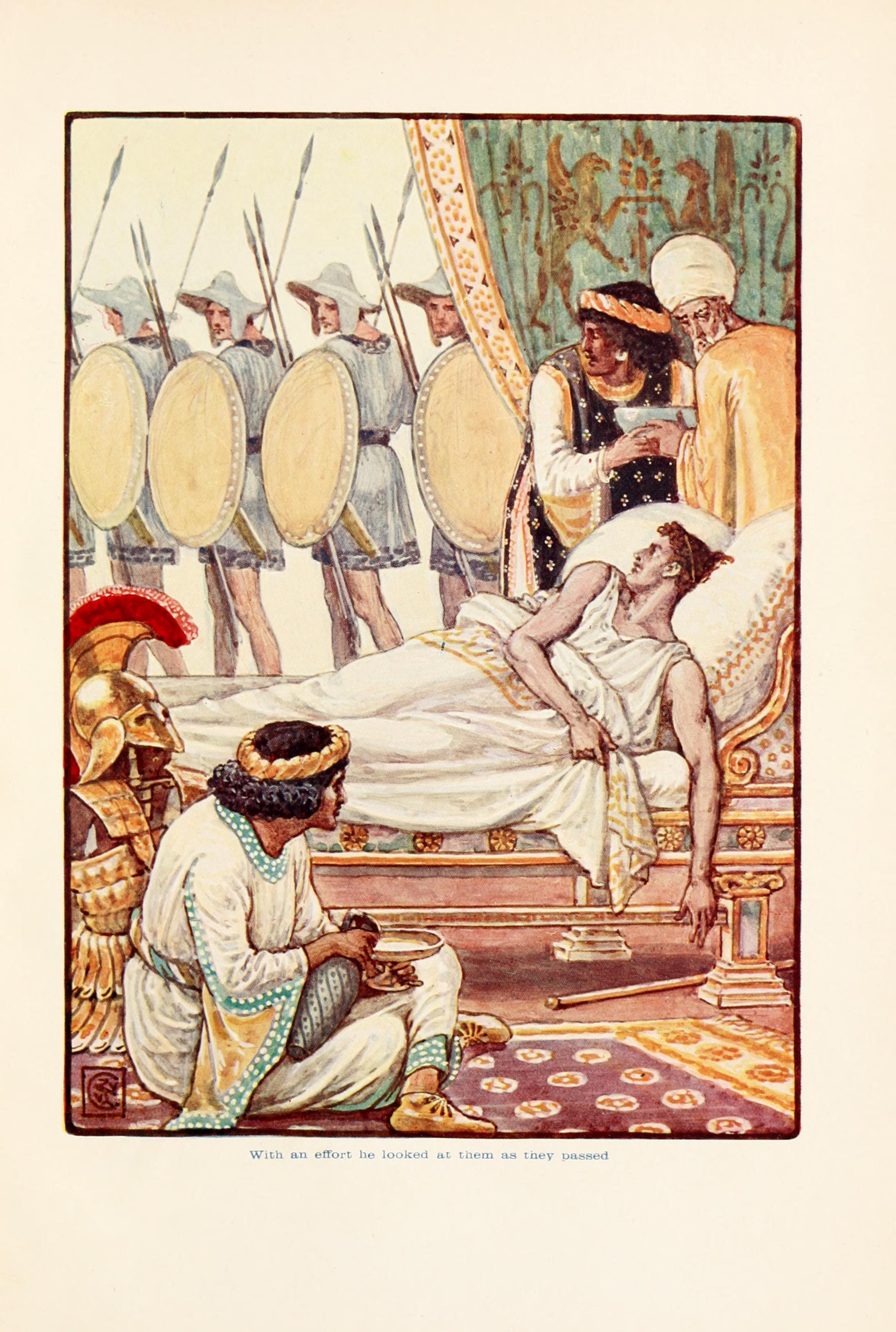
"With an effort he looked at them as they passed"

In February 323 BCE, Alexander ordered his armies to prepare for the march to Babylon. According to Arrian, after crossing the Tigris Alexander was met by Chaldeans, who advised him not to enter the city because their deity Bel had warned them that to do so at that time would be fatal for Alexander. The Chaldeans also warned Alexander against marching westwards as he would then look to the setting sun, a symbol of decline. It was suggested that he enter Babylon via the Royal Gate, in the western wall, where he would face to the east. Alexander followed this advice, but the route turned out to be unfavorable because of swampy terrain. According to Jona Lendering, "it seems that in May 323" the Babylonian astrologers tried to avert the misfortune by substituting Alexander with an ordinary person on the Babylonian throne, who would take the brunt of the omen. The Greeks, however, did not understand that ritual.

=== Prophecy of Calanus ===
Calanus was likely to be a Hindu Naga sadhu, whom Greeks called gymnosophists. He had accompanied the Greek army back from Punjab, upon request by Alexander. He was 73 years of age at that time. However, when Persian weather and travel fatigue weakened him, he informed Alexander that he would rather die than live disabled. He decided to take his life by self-immolation. Alexander tried to dissuade him from doing so but upon the insistence of Calanus, Alexander relented and the job of building a pyre was entrusted to Ptolemy. This incident took place in Susa in 323 BCE. Calanus is mentioned also by Alexander's admiral, Nearchus, and Chares of Mytilene. He did not flinch as he burnt to the astonishment of those who watched. Before immolating himself alive on the pyre, his last words to Alexander were "We shall meet in Babylon". Thus he is said to have prophesied the death of Alexander in Babylon. At the time of the death of Calanus, Alexander, however, did not have any plan to go to Babylon.

== Causes ==
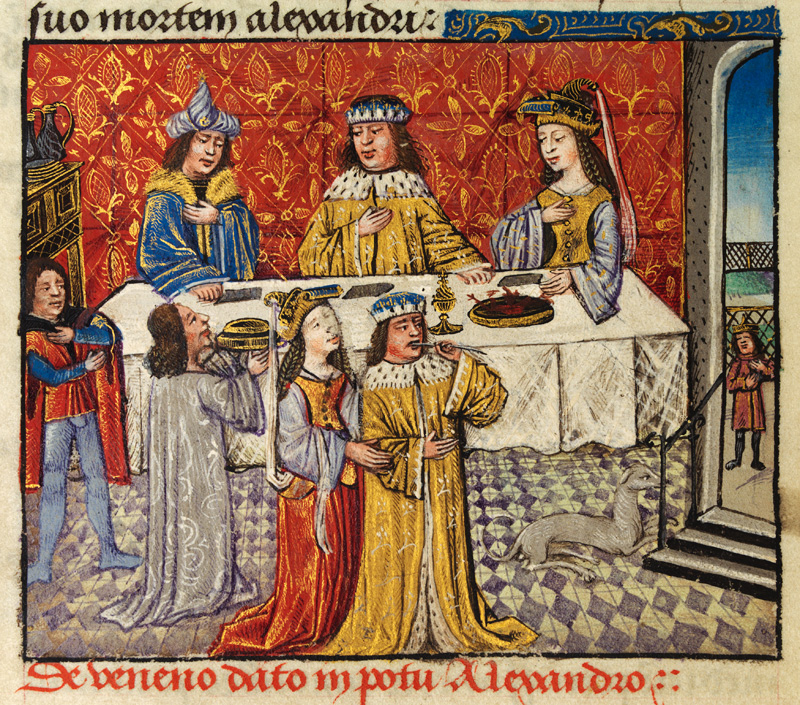
The poisoning of Alexander depicted in the 15th century romance The History of Alexander's Battles, J1 version. NLW MS Pen.481D

Alexander suffered 12–14 days of what is described as a feverish type of illness, possibly an infectious disease, dying on June 10, 323 BCE at the age of 32. Some accounts propose causes of Alexander's death such as alcoholic liver disease, and poisoning by strychnine, but there is little data to support those versions. According to Andrew N. Williams and Robert Arnott, in his last days Alexander was unable to speak, which was due to a previous injury to his neck during the Siege of Cyropolis. Other retrodiagnoses include noninfectious diseases as well. According to historical accounts, Alexander's body began to decompose six days after his death.

=== Malaria ===
According to author Andrew Chugg, there is evidence that Alexander died of malaria, having contracted it two weeks before the onset of illness while sailing in the marshes to inspect flood defenses. Chugg based his argument on the Ephemerides (Journal) compiled by Alexander's secretary, Eumenes of Cardia. Chugg also showed in a paper in the Ancient History Bulletin that the Ephemerides are probably authentic. Chugg further noted that Arrian states that Alexander "no longer had any rest from the fever" halfway through his fatal illness. This is evidence that the fever had initially been intermittent, which is the signature fever curve of Plasmodium falciparum (the expected malarial parasite, given Alexander's travel history and the severity of the illness), thus enhancing the likelihood of malaria. The malaria version was also supported by Paul Cartledge.

=== Typhoid fever ===
According to the University of Maryland School of Medicine report of 1998, Alexander probably died of typhoid fever (which, along with malaria, was common in ancient Babylon). In the week before his death, historical accounts mention chills, sweats, exhaustion and high fever, typical symptoms of infectious diseases, including typhoid fever. According to David W. Oldach from the University of Maryland Medical Center, Alexander also had "severe abdominal pain, causing him to cry out in agony". The associated account, however, comes from the unreliable Alexander Romance.

=== West Nile fever ===
Epidemiologist John Marr and Charles Calisher put forward the West Nile fever as the possible cause of Alexander's death. This version was deemed "fairly compelling" by University of Rhode Island epidemiologist Thomas Mather, who nonetheless noted that the West Nile virus tends to kill the elderly or those with weakened immune systems. The version of Marr and Calisher was also criticized by Burke A. Cunha from Winthrop University Hospital. According to analysis of other authors in response to Marr and Calisher, the West Nile virus could not have infected humans before the 8th century CE.

=== Poisoning ===
Alexander poisoned, from the Trebizond Alexander Romance

Throughout the centuries suspicions of possible poisoning have fallen on a number of alleged perpetrators, including one of Alexander's wives, his generals, his illegitimate half-brother or the royal cup-bearer. The poisoning version is featured particularly in the politically motivated Liber de Morte Testamentoque Alexandri (The Book On the Death and Testament of Alexander), which tries to discredit the family of Antipater. It was argued that the book was compiled in Polyperchon's circle, not before c. 317 BCE. This theory was also advanced by Justin in his Historia Philippicae et Totius Mundi Origines et Terrae Situs where he stated that Antipater murdered Alexander by feeding him a poison so strong that it "could be conveyed [only] in the hoof of a horse.".

In Alexander the Great: The Death of a God, Paul C. Doherty claimed that Alexander was poisoned with arsenic by his possibly illegitimate half-brother Ptolemy I Soter. However, this was disputed by New Zealand National Poisons Centre toxicologist Dr. Leo Schep, who discounted arsenic poisoning and instead suggested that he could have been poisoned by a wine made from the plant Veratrum album, known as white hellebore. This poisonous plant can produce prolonged poisoning symptoms that match the course of events as described in the Alexander Romance, and was known to the ancient Greeks. The article was published in the peer-reviewed medical journal Clinical Toxicology and suggested that if Alexander was poisoned, Veratrum album offers the most plausible cause. This theory is supported by the writings of the ancient Greek historian Diodorus, who had recorded Alexander becoming "stricken with pain after drinking a large bowl of wine" at a banquet hosted by one of his officers, Medius of Larissa. However, historian Robin Lane Fox has argued that allegations of poisoning are "technically implausible" given the length of time between Alexander's first reported symptoms and his death. "The poisons of herbalists were swift and irremediable, whether hemlocks, hellebores or belladonnas, and except as an explanation of mysterious illness, a slow poison met no need in the poison-chests of ancient Greece. If Alexander had been poisoned, he should surely have been given a massive dose which was absolutely certain to kill him at once. And yet diaries, pamphlets and official calendars insist that twelve days elapsed between Medius's fateful banquet and the death of the king."

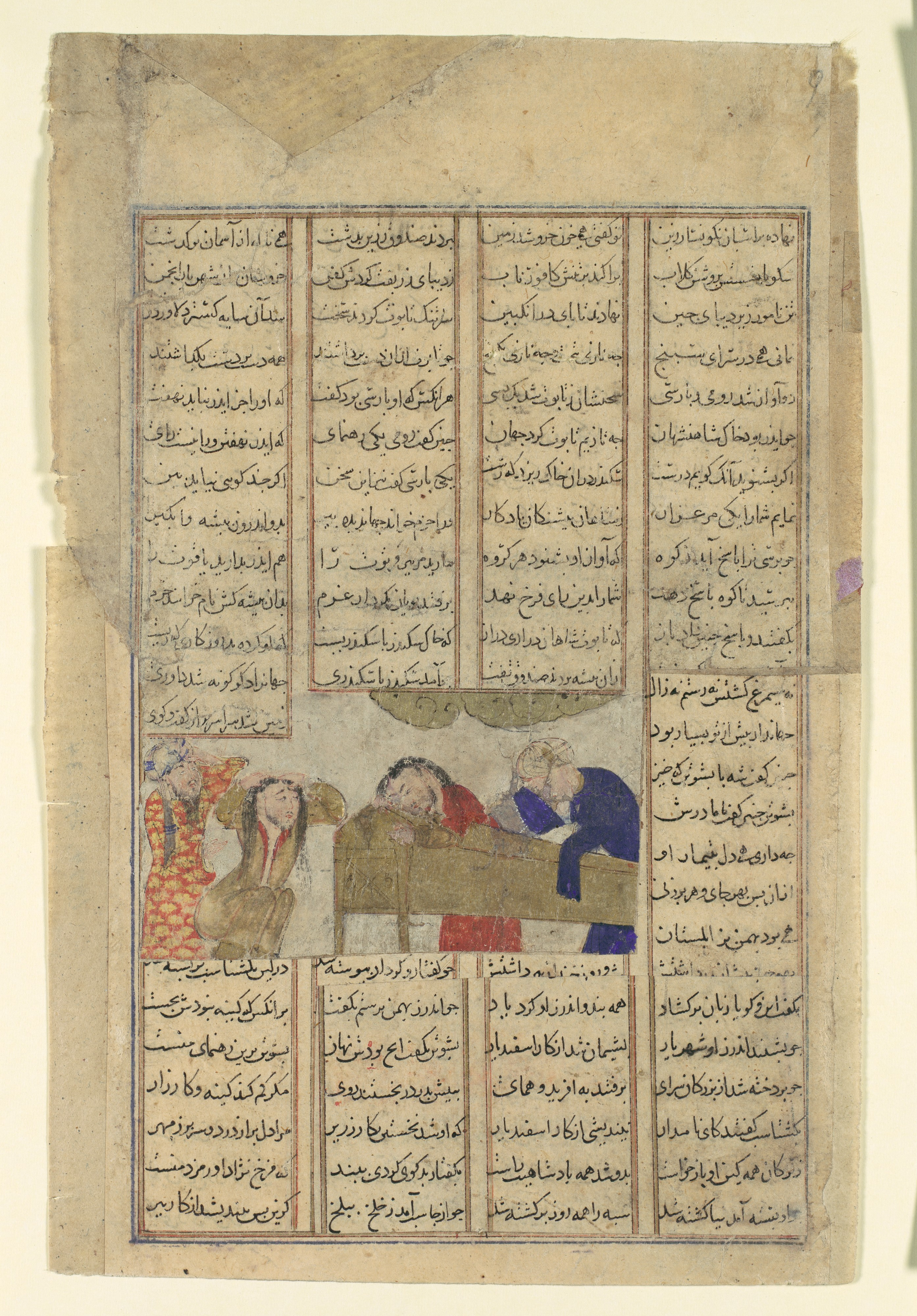
"The Funeral of Iskandar," Folio from a Shahnama (Persian Book of Kings). Stories of Alexander's life and death detailed throughout his reign as ruler over the Persian empire.

=== Other causes ===
Other causes that have been put forward include acute pancreatitis provoked by "heavy alcohol consumption and a very rich meal", acute endocarditis, schistosomiasis brought on by Schistosoma haematobium, porphyria, and Guillain–Barré syndrome. Fritz Schachermeyr proposed leukemia and malaria. When Alexander's symptoms were entered into databases of the Global Infectious Disease Epidemiology Network, influenza gained the highest probability (41.2%) on the list of differential diagnoses. However, according to Cunha, the symptoms and course of Alexander's disease are inconsistent with influenza, as well as with malaria, schistosomiasis, and poisoning in particular.

Another theory moves away from disease and hypothesizes that Alexander's death was related to a congenital scoliotic syndrome. It has been discussed that Alexander had structural neck deformities and oculomotor deficits, which could be associated with Klippel–Feil syndrome, a rare congenital scoliotic disorder. His physical deformities and symptoms leading up to his death are what lead experts to believe this. Some believe that as Alexander fell ill in his final days, he suffered from progressive epidural spinal cord compression, which left him quadriplegic. However, this hypothesis cannot be proven without a full analysis of Alexander's body.

Some have speculated that he suffered from Guillain–Barré syndrome, which typhoid fever can lead to when complicated with other maladies. He may have contracted this disease from a Helicobacter pylori infection after his lung wound during the siege of Multan, where it was common at the time. Proponents say this would explain why Alexander's body reportedly did not decompose for 6 days following his presumed death, as he may well have been still alive but in a deep coma.

== Body preservation ==
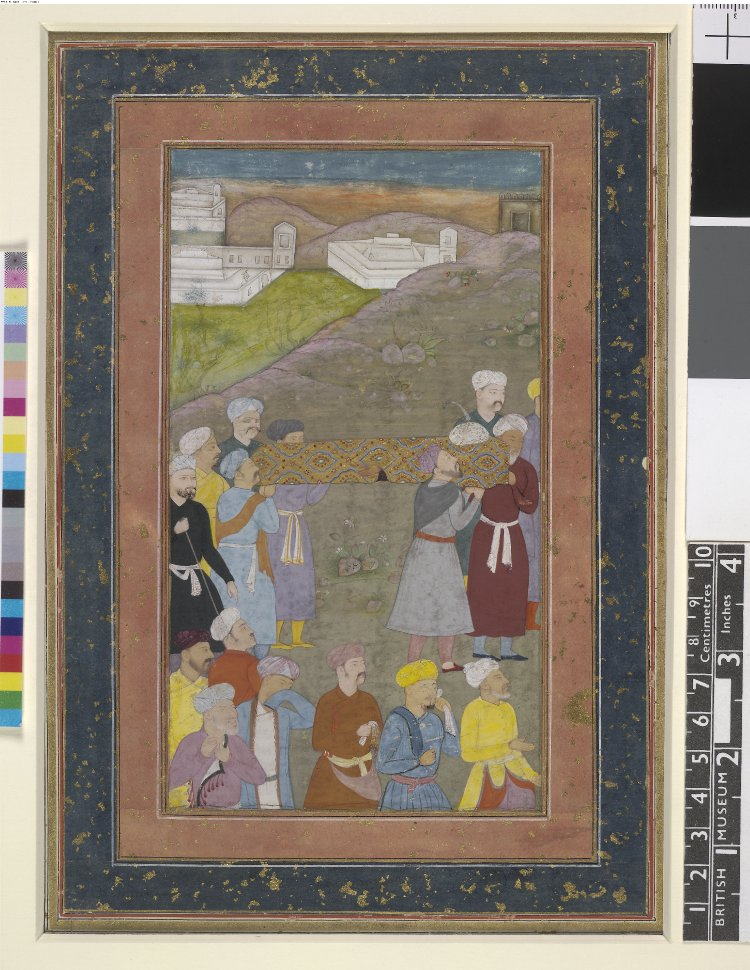
Funeral of Iskander (Alexander): pallbearers carry his coffin draped with brocaded silk and his turban at one end. In Nizami's version Iskandar fell ill and died near Babylon. Because it was believed he had been poisoned, no antidotes could revive him.

One ancient account reports that the planning and construction of an appropriate funerary cart to convey the body out from Babylon took two years from the time of Alexander's death. It is not known exactly how the body was preserved for about two years before it was moved from Babylon. In 1889, E. A. Wallis Budge suggested that the body was submerged in a vat of honey, while Plutarch reported treatment by Egyptian embalmers.

Egyptian and Chaldean embalmers who arrived on 16 June are said to have attested to Alexander's lifelike appearance. This was interpreted as a complication of typhoid fever, known as ascending paralysis, which causes a person to appear dead prior to death.

== Tomb ==
On its way back to Macedonia, the funerary cart with Alexander's body was met in Syria by one of Alexander's generals, the future ruler Ptolemy I Soter. In late 322 or early 321 BCE Ptolemy diverted the body to Egypt where it was interred in Memphis. In the late 4th or early 3rd century BCE Alexander's body was transferred from the Memphis tomb to Alexandria for reburial (by Ptolemy Philadelphus in c. 280 BCE, according to Pausanias). Later Ptolemy Philopator placed Alexander's body in Alexandria's communal mausoleum. Shortly after the death of Cleopatra, Alexander's tomb was visited by Augustus, who is said to have placed flowers on the tomb and a golden diadem upon Alexander's head. By the 4th century CE, the location of Alexander's body was no longer known; later authors, such as Ibn Abd al-Hakam, Al-Masudi and Leo Africanus, report having seen Alexander's tomb. Leo Africanus in 1491 and George Sandys in 1611 reportedly saw the tomb in Alexandria. According to one legend, the body lies in a crypt beneath an early Christian church.

== See also ==
- List of unsolved deaths
- Ptolemaic cult of Alexander the Great
