= Promachus of Macedon =

Ancient Macedonian soldier

Promachus (Ancient Greek: Πρόμαχος, died 324 BC) was a common soldier in the army of Alexander the Great. According to Plutarch, citing Chares of Mytilene, Promachus drank the equivalent of 13 litres of unmixed wine in 324 BC at Susa, when a drinking contest was held in connection with the funeral of Indian philosopher Calanus. He won the first prize of a golden crown worth a talent and died three days later. Forty-one other contestants allegedly died of alcohol poisoning as well.

The primary source for the story of the drinking contest and its winner, Promachus, is the History of Alexander by Chares of Mytilene. Although the original work has not survived, the account has come down to modern times through the writings of Plutarch, Athenaeus, and Claudius Aelianus.
