= Zarmanochegas =

1st century BC Indian philosopher and monk

Zarmanochegas (Greek: Ζαρμανοχηγάς; according to Strabo) or Zarmarus (according to Dio Cassius) was a gymnosophist (naked philosopher), a monk of the Sramana tradition (possibly, but not necessarily a Buddhist) who, according to ancient historians such as Strabo and Dio Cassius, met Nicholas of Damascus in Antioch in the first years of Augustus' rule over the Roman Empire, and shortly thereafter proceeded to Athens where he burnt himself to death. He is estimated to have died in 19 BC.

== Pandion mission ==
The inscription on the tomb of Zarmanochegas in Athens states he came from Barygaza. This port, named on the map as Barigaza on the Gulf of Khambhat facilitated trade with ancient Axum, Egypt, Arabia and the sea-land trade routes via the Tigris-Euphrates valley and Ancient Rome.

Nicolaus of Damascus (d. AD 4), describes an embassy sent by the Indian king Porus (or Pandion, Pandya, or Pandita) to Caesar Augustus. The embassy traveled with a diplomatic letter on parchment in Greek. One of its members was a sramana who burned himself alive in Athens to demonstrate his faith. Nicholas of Damascus met the embassy at Antioch (near present-day Antakya in Turkey) and this is related by Strabo (XV,1,73) and Dio Cassius (liv, 9). The monk's self-immolation made a sensation and was quoted by Strabo and Dio Cassius (Hist 54.9). His tomb indicated he came from Barygaza which is now Bharuch city of Gujarat, near the north bank of the Narmada River; the name being derived from one of the ancient Rishis (Bhrigu) who lived there. Dio Cassius (Roman History, 54.9.10) mentions that Sramana threw himself into fire "either because, being of the caste of sages, he was on this account moved by ambition, or, in accordance with the traditional custom of the Indians, because of old age, or because he wished to make a display for the benefit of Augustus and the Athenians (for Augustus had reached Athens)." According to Dio Cassius (54.9.8) Augustus met an Indian delegation while staying for winter at Samos (20/19 BC). Priaulx notes that the poet Horace also alludes to an Indian mission (Carmen Seculare 55, 56, written 17 BC; Ode 14, L.iv, 13 BC; and Ode 12, L. i, 22 BC)). Priaulx notes that later writers such as Suetonius (2nd century AD) (Hist. Rome IV C 12) and Florus (2nd century AD) (Augustus C21) refer to this Indian mission as well. Augustus himself (Res Gestae Divi Augusti, 31) notes that "еmbassies were often sent to me from the kings of India, a thing never seen before in the camp of any general of the Romans."

== Self-immolation and tomb in Athens ==
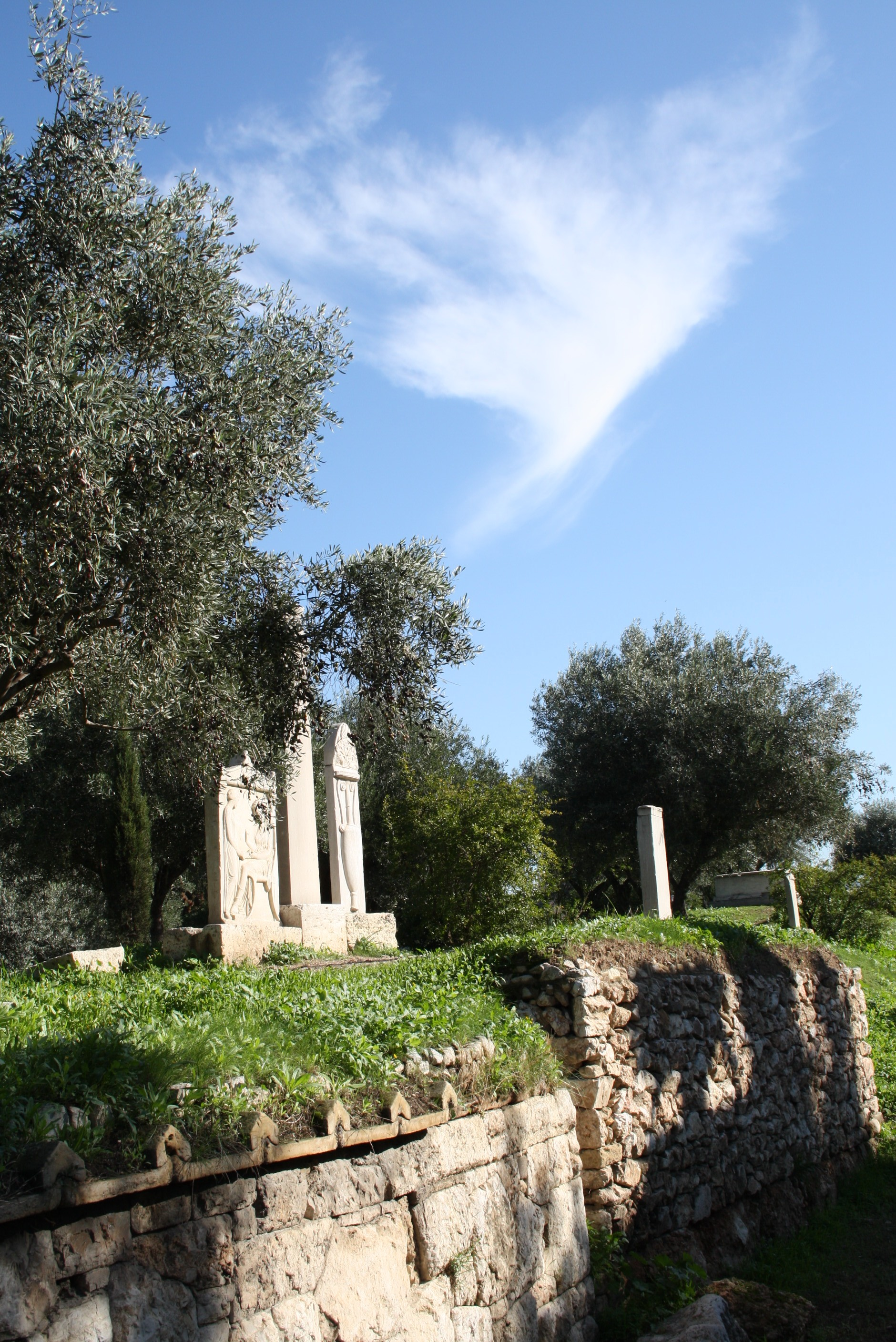
Keramikos cemetery, Athens. The tomb of Zarmanochegas was well known in Athens, according to Plutarch.

A tomb was made to the sramana, still visible in the time of Plutarch (d. AD 119), which bore the epitaph "ΖΑΡΜΑΝΟΧΗΓΑΣ ΙΝΔΟΣ ΑΠΟ ΒΑΡΓΟΣΗΣ" ("Zarmanochegas, Indian from Bargosa"). Plutarch, in his Life of Alexander, after discussing the self-immolation of Calanus of India (Kalanos), writes:

The same thing was done long after by another Indian who came with Caesar to Athens, where they still show you "the Indian's Monument."

Strabo's (d. AD 24) account at Geographia xv, i, 4 is as follows:

From one place in India, and from one king, namely, Pandian, or, according to others, Porus, presents and embassies were sent to Augustus Caesar. With the ambassadors came the Indian Gymnosophist, who committed himself to the flames at Athens, like Calanus, who exhibited the same spectacle in the presence of Alexander.

Strabo adds (at xv, i, 73):

To these accounts may be added that of Nicolaus Damascenus. This writer states that at Antioch, near Daphne, he met with ambassadors from the Indians, who were sent to Augustus Caesar. It appeared from the letter that several persons were mentioned in it, but three only survived, whom he says he saw. The rest had died chiefly in consequence of the length of the journey. The letter was written in Greek upon a skin; the import of it was, that Porus was the writer, that although he was sovereign of six hundred kings, yet that he highly esteemed the friendship of Caesar; that he was willing to allow him a passage through his country, in whatever part he pleased, and to assist him in any undertaking that was just. Eight naked servants, with girdles round their waists, and fragrant with perfumes, presented the gifts which were brought. The presents were a Hermes (i. e. a man) born without arms, whom I have seen, large snakes, a serpent ten cubits in length, a river tortoise of three cubits in length, and a partridge larger than a vulture. They were accompanied by the person, it is said, who burnt himself to death at Athens. This is the practice with persons in distress, who seek escape from existing calamities, and with others in prosperous circumstances, as was the case with this man. For as everything hitherto had succeeded with him, he thought it necessary to depart, lest some unexpected calamity should happen to him by continuing to live; with a smile, therefore, naked, anointed, and with the girdle round his waist, he leaped upon the pyre. On his tomb was this inscription:

ZARMANOCHEGAS, AN INDIAN, A NATIVE OF BARGOSA, HAVING IMMORTALIZED HIMSELF ACCORDING TO THE CUSTOM OF HIS COUNTRY, HERE LIES.

Cassius Dio's (d. AD 235) later account reads:

For a great many embassies came to him, and the people of India, who had already made overtures, now made a treaty of friendship, sending among other gifts tigers, which were then for the first time seen by the Romans, as also, I think by the Greeks ... One of the Indians, Zarmarus, for some reason wished to die, — either because, being of the caste of sages, he was on this account moved by ambition, or, in accordance with the traditional custom of the Indians, because of old age, or because he wished to make a display for the benefit of Augustus and the Athenians (for Augustus had reached Athens);— he was therefore initiated into the mysteries of the two goddesses, which were held out of season on account, they say, of Augustus, who also was an initiate, and he then threw himself alive into the fire.

Based on the different ways Strabo and Dio Cassio render the name (Zarmanochegas, Zarmarus), modern scholars attempted at interpreting Strabo's version as a combination of two words carrying additional information (see below under "Interpretation of the inscription in regard to religious affiliation"), thus raising the question of the state of the tomb inscription at different times in the past.

The Eleusinian Mysteries (Ἐλευσίνια Μυστήρια) were initiation ceremonies of pre-historic antiquity focused on immortality and held in honour of Demeter and Persephone based at Eleusis in ancient Greece. Augustus became an initiate in 31 BC and again in 19 BC (Cassius Dio 51.4.1 and 54.9.10).

== Interpretation of the inscription in regard to religious affiliation ==
Charles Eliot in his Hinduism and Buddhism: An Historical Sketch (1921) considers that the name Zarmanochegas "perhaps contains the two words sramana and acarya."

HL Jones (2006) interprets the inscription as mentioned by Strabo and sees two words at the beginning, instead of one name:

The Sramana master, an Indian, a native of Bargosa, having immortalized himself according to the custom of his country, lies here.

Groskurd (1833) refers to Zarmanochegas as Zarmanos Chanes and as an Indian wiseman (indischer Weiser).

Priaulx (1873) translates the name in Sanskrit as çramanakarja ("teacher of Shamans") and adds "which points him out as of the Buddhist faith and a priest, and, as his death proves, a priest earnest in his faith."

Halkias (2015) situates Zarmanochegas within a lineage of Buddhist sramanas who had adopted the custom of setting themselves on fire.

== See also ==
- Peregrinus Proteus
- Kalanos
