= Geocriticism =

Method of literary analysis and literary theory

Geocriticism is a method of literary analysis and literary theory that incorporates the study of geographic space. The term designates a number of different critical practices. In France, Bertrand Westphal has elaborated the concept of géocritique in several works. In the United States, Robert Tally has argued for geocriticism as a critical practice suited to the analysis of what he has termed "literary cartography".

== Origins ==
Some of the first expressly geocritical writings emerged from symposia organized by Westphal at the University of Limoges. Westphal's foundational essay, "Pour une approche géocritique des textes" constitutes a manifesto for geocriticism. Westphal's theory is elaborated in greater detail in his Geocriticism: Real and Fictional Spaces, translated by Tally, who also provides a brief introduction. But there are also many works addressing similar themes and using similar methods that might be considered geocritical, even if the term "geocriticism" is not used.

== Theory ==
In Westphal's theory, geocriticism is based on three theoretical concepts: spatio-temporality, transgressivity, and referentiality.

The idea that space and time form a continuum (space-time) is a tenet of modern physics. In the field of literary theory, geocriticism is an interdisciplinary method of literary analysis that focuses not only on such temporal data as relations between the life and times of the author (as in biographical criticism), the history of the text (as in textual criticism), or the story (as studied by narratology), but also on spatial data. Geocriticism therefore has affinities with geography, architecture, urban studies, and so on; it also correlates to philosophical concepts such as deterritorialization.

Following the work of Michel Foucault, Gilles Deleuze, Henri Lefebvre and Mikhail Bakhtin, among others, a geocritical approach to literature recognizes that representations of space are often transgressive, crossing the boundaries of established norms while also reestablishing new relations among people, places, and things. Cartography is no longer seen as the exclusive province of the state or the government; rather, various agents or groups may be responsible for representing the geographic spaces at the same time and with different effects. In practice, therefore, geocriticism is multifocal, examining a variety of topics at once, thus differentiating itself from practices that focus on the singular point of view of the traveller or protagonist.

Geocriticism also assumes a literary referentiality between world and text, or, in other words, between the referent and its representation. By questioning the relations between a given space's nature and its actual existing condition, the geocritical approach allows for a study of fiction that points also to the theory of possible worlds, such as may be seen in the work on third space by the American geographer Edward Soja (Thirdspace). Tally's book Spatiality, an introduction to spatiality studies in literature and critical theory, includes a chapter on geocriticism.

== Critical practices ==
Geocriticism frequently involves the study of places described in literature by various authors, but it can also study the effects of literary representations of a given space. An example of the range of geocritical practices can be found in Tally's collection Geocritical Explorations: Space, Place, and Mapping in Literary and Cultural Studies.

Geocriticism derives some of its practices from precursors whose theoretical work helped establish space as a valid topic for literary analysis. For example, in The Poetics of Space and elsewhere, Gaston Bachelard studied literary works to develop a typology of places according to their connotations. Maurice Blanchot's writings have legitimized the idea of literary space, an imaginary place for the creation of the work of literature. One might also look at the developments of cultural studies and especially postcolonial studies, such as Raymond Williams's The Country and the City or Edward Said's Culture and Imperialism, which employ what Said has called a "geographical inquiry into historical experience." Fredric Jameson's concept of cognitive mapping and his theoretical engagement with the postmodern condition also highlight the importance of spatial representation and aesthetic productions, including literature, film, architecture, and design. In The Atlas of European Novel, 1800-1900, Franco Moretti has examined the diffusion of literary spaces in Europe, focusing on the complex relationship between the text and space. Moretti has also promulgated a theory of literary history, or literary geography, that would use maps to bring to light new connections between the texts studied and their social spaces. And, in his study of Herman Melville's literary cartography, Robert Tally has offered a geocritical approach to certain texts.

Geocriticism has intellectual and methodological affiliations with such fields as Literature and the Environment or ecocriticism, regional literature, urban studies, sociological and philosophical approaches to literature, and utopian studies.
