= Bragmanni =

A mythical race in medieval European anthropogeography

Bragmanni were a mythical race of people thought by medieval Europeans to live on the fringes of the known world. The name could be derived from that of the Hindu caste of the Brahmins; however, some medieval writers clearly differentiate between the Brahmins and the imagined Bragmanni. Although they were often lumped together with monstrous races such as cyclopes and Cynocephali, Bragmanni were normal in appearance, and differed from other humans because of their unique lifestyle.

Bragmanni were unclothed, cave-dwelling wise men who were extremely moralistic and ascetic. They are often merged or confused with Gymnosophists, a similar group of wise men.
