= Protiadae (family) =

Prominent Massaliote family

The Protiadae were a prominent Massaliote family. The family probably claimed descent from the Phocaean Greek Prō̃tis (Πρῶτις), a legendary figure said to be the son of Euxenus, a Phocaean founder of Massalia, in one account and to have himself founded the city in another. Aristotle reported that the family was still present in the area in his time.

According to Aristotle, the Phocaean Euxenus was invited to the feast for the marriage of the daughter of the Segobrigian chief Nannus. The woman, named Petta, was to choose her future husband at the party, by giving one of the suitors a cup containing wine mixed with water. She chose Euxenus, who gave her the Greek name of Aristoxena. Their son, Protis, would be the founder of the family. Thus, a new patrilineal descent-group split off Nannus and the Segobrigii. Aristotle, however, speaks of the family as "descended from her", perhaps alluding to the semi-matrilineal system of the Celto-Ligurians.

According to Justin, who says Massalia was founded by the Phoecians during the time of Tarquinius Priscus, Protis was indeed the city-founder, having led a fleet of Greeks from Phoecia to the area of Massalia. It was him, then, who married the daughter of Nannus, whose name is Gyptis in this version. Also Plutarch speaks of Protos as the founder of the city.

== See also ==
- Founding myth of Marseille
