= Kalanos =

Indian philosopher (c. 398–323 BCE)

Kalanos, also spelled Calanus (Ancient Greek: Καλανός) (c. 398 – 323 BCE), was an ancient Indian gymnosophist, sage, and philosopher from Taxila who accompanied Alexander the Great and was his teacher. He accompanied Alexander to Persis and, after falling ill, immolated himself by entering a pyre in front of Alexander's army. Diodorus Siculus called him Caranus (Ancient Greek: Κάρανος).

According to the Greek sources, he did not flinch as his body burned. He bade goodbye to some of the Greek soldiers who were his students, but not to Alexander. He communicated to Alexander that he would meet him in Babylon and Alexander died exactly a year later in Babylon. It was from Kalanos that Alexander learned of Dandamis, the leader of their group, whom Alexander later went to meet in the forest.

== Early life ==
Plutarch indicates that his real name was Sphínēs and that he was from Taxila, but since he greeted people with the word "Kalē!" – perhaps kalya (कल्य) "Greetings" – the Greeks called him Kalanos.

Most sources and scholars refer to Kalanos as a Brahmin sage, Some scholars have claimed that Kalanos was a Jain, but modern scholarship rejects this notion as Jain ascetics are forbidden from using fire and intentional self-harm due to their convictions about Sallekhana. He was not a Jain monk due to the violent suicide he committed. Further, considering the dominant Brahmanical presence in Taxila, it is likely that the ascetics Alexandar met, including Kalanos, were Brahmanical. Johannes Bronkhorst states that it is highly unlikely that Buddhists and Jains were present in the areas Alexander visited.

== Meeting Alexander ==
Plutarch records that when first invited to meet Alexander, Kalanos "roughly commanded him to strip himself and hear what he said naked, otherwise he would not speak a word to him, though he came from Jupiter himself." Kalanos refused the rich gifts offered by Alexander, saying that man's desire cannot be satisfied by such gifts. The gymnosophists believed that even if Alexander killed them "they would be delivered from the body of flesh now afflicted with age and would be translated to a better and purer life."

Alexander's representative Onesicritus had a discussion with several gymnosophists and Alexander was attracted by their thoughts on Greek philosophy, of which they generally approved, but criticized the Greeks for preferring custom to nature and for refusing to give up clothing.

Alexander persuaded Kalanos to accompany him to Persis and stay with him as one of his teachers. Alexander even hinted use of force to take him to his country, to which Kalanos replied philosophically, that "what shall I be worth to you, Alexander, for exhibiting to the Greeks if I am compelled to do what I do not wish to do?" Kalanos lived as a teacher to Alexander and represented "eastern honesty and freedom".

== Death and prophecy ==
He was seventy-three years of age at time of his death. When the Persian weather and arduous travels had weakened him, he informed Alexander that he would prefer to die rather than live as an invalid. He decided to take his life by self-immolation. Although Alexander tried to dissuade him from this course of action, upon Kalanos' insistence the job of building a pyre was entrusted to Ptolemy. Kalanos is mentioned also by Alexander's admirals, Nearchus and Chares of Mytilene. The city where this immolation took place was Susa in the year 323 BC. Kalanos distributed all the costly gifts he got from the king to the people and wore just a garland of flowers and chanted vedic hymns. He presented his horse to one of his Greek pupils named Lysimachus. He did not flinch as he burnt to the astonishment of those who watched. Although Alexander was not personally present at time of his immolation, his last words to Alexander were "We shall meet in Babylon". He is said to have thus prophesied the death of Alexander in Babylon, even though at the time of death of Kalanos, Alexander did not have any plans to go to Babylon.

A drinking contest was held in response to his death. According to Plutarch, citing Chares of Mytilene, Promachus of Macedon drank the equivalent of 13 litres of unmixed wine and won the first prize of a golden crown worth a talent. He died three days later and forty-one other contestants allegedly died of alcohol poisoning as well.

== Legacy ==
A letter written by Kalanos to Alexander is preserved by Philo.

A painting c. 1672 by Jean Baptiste de Champaigne depicts "Alexander the Great receiving the news of the death by immolation of the gymnosophist Calanus" is displayed at Chateau de Versailles et de Trianon, Versailles.

== See also ==
- Peregrinus Proteus
- Zarmanochegas
