= Bertrand Westphal =

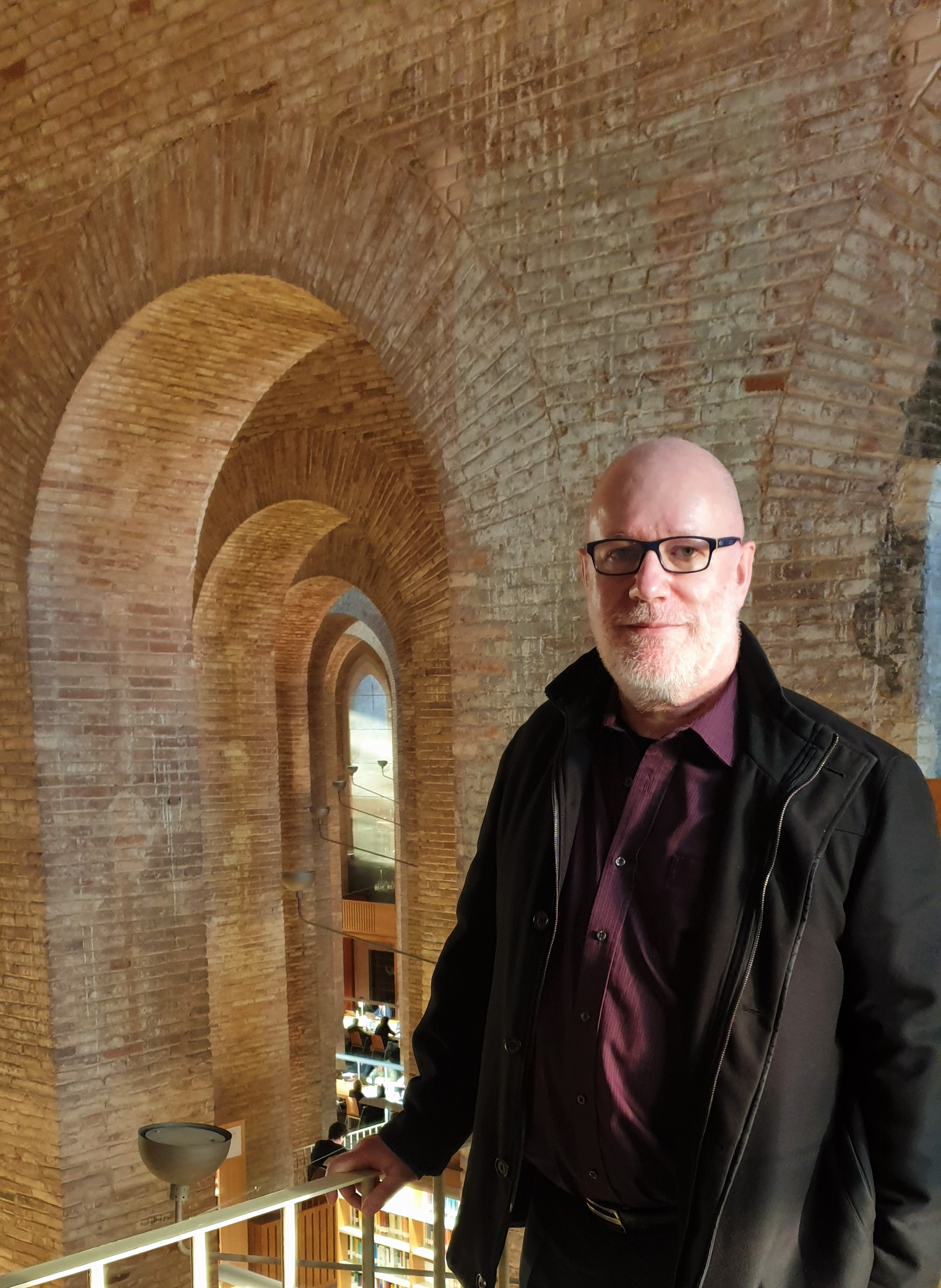
- Bertrand Westphal at the Universitat Pompeu Fabra, in Barcelona, in 2020
- Born: May 10, 1962 (age 63); Strasbourg, France
- Occupations: scholar, essayist
- Known for: Geocriticism

Bertrand Westphal (born May 10, 1962, in Strasbourg, France), is a French scholar and essayist.

== Career ==
Westphal, a professor of comparative literature and literary theory, has been teaching at the University of Limoges since 1998. He has been directing the "Human Spaces and Cultural Interactions" research team (EA 1087) since 2000.

He was a visiting professor at Texas Tech University (2005) and at the University of North Carolina Charlotte (2013-2015).

Westphal is the founder of Geocriticism, a method of literary analysis and literary theory that incorporates the study of geographic space. After editing the first collective work on this topic (La Géocritique mode d'emploi), he published the essay La Géocritique. Réel, fiction, espace in 2007. In 2011, the book was translated into English (United States), under the title of Geocriticism: Real and Fictional Spaces by Robert Tally, who has become one of the main promoters of this literary approach in the United States. Geocriticism lays the foundations of the homonymous theory, i.e. an interdisciplinary method of literary analysis that focuses on spatial representations.

In 2011, Westphal published the essay Le Monde plausible. Espace, lieu, carte, which proposes a diachronic study of the models of spatial representation. In this book, he distinguishes open space and closed place and gives special value to maps. In 2013, Le Monde plausible was translated into English (United States) by Amy Wells, under the title The Plausible World.

A third volume, La Cage des méridiens. La littérature et l’art contemporain face à la globalisation, published in March 2016, completes what appears to be a Geocriticism trilogy. This work examines the specific role of literature and contemporary art on a global scale and focuses on transcultural logics and decentering.

Westphal is the author of several other books, such as Roman et Evangile (2000), about the transposition, in a plain narratological sense, of episodes or characters drawn from the Gospels in the contemporary European novel. He is also the author of L’œil de la Méditerranée. Une odyssée littéraire (2005), which brings together a series of studies of Mediterranean places, and Austro-fictions. Une géographie de l’intime (2010), which explores the works of a dozen of contemporary Austrian writers.

== Bibliography ==
In English:

- Geocriticism. Real and Fictional Spaces, New York, Palgrave Macmillan, 2011, translated by Robert T. Tally Jr., XIII, 192 ISBN 978-1-137-47994-5
- The Plausible World. A Geocritical Approach to Space, Place, and Maps, 2013, translated by Amy Wells, XV, 191 ISBN 9781137364586

In French:

- La Géocritique mode d’emploi, Limoges, Presses Universitaires de Limoges, 2000, 311 p. ISBN 978-2842871406
- Le Rivage des mythes : une géocritique méditerranéenne : le lieu et son mythe, Limoges, Presses Universitaires de Limoges, coll. « Espaces humains », 2001, 384 p. ISBN 9782842871994
- Roman & évangile: transposition de l'évangile dans le roman européen, Limoges, Presses Universitaires de Limoges, 2002, 406 p. ISBN 9782842872281
- Littérature et espaces, avec Juliette Vion-Dury et Jean-Marie Grassin, Limoges, Presses Universitaires de Limoges, 2003, 668 p., ISBN 978-2842873080
- L’Œil de la Méditerranée : Une odyssée littéraire, La Tour d'Aigues, France, Éditions de l'Aube, coll. « Regards croisés », 2005, 397 p. ISBN 9782752601681
- La Géocritique. Réel, fiction, espace, Paris, Éditions de Minuit, coll. « Paradoxe », 2007, 304 p. ISBN 9782707320049
- Austro-fictions : Une géographie de l'intime, Publications de l'Université de Rouen et du Havre, éditeur, coll. « Austriaca », 2010, 190 p. ISBN 978-2877754927
- Espaces, Tourismes, Esthétiques, avec Lorenzo Flabbi et Col., Limoges, Presses Universitaires de Limoges, coll. « Espaces humains », 2010, 272 p. ISBN 978-2842875077
- Le Monde plausible. Espace, lieu, carte, Paris, Éditions de Minuit, coll. « Paradoxe », 2011, 256 p. ISBN 9782707321930
- L’Émergence, en réponse aux travaux de Jean-Marie Grassin, avec Jacques Fontanille et Juliette Vion-Dury (éds.), Bern, Berlin, Bruxelles, Peter Lang, 2011, 282p. ISBN 978-3-0343-0513-6
- La Cage des méridiens. La Littérature et l’Art contemporain face à la globalisation, Éditions de Minuit, 2016, 272p. ISBN 978-2-7073-2958-5
