= Global Infectious Disease Epidemiology Network =

Medical decision support system (GIDEON)

Global Infectious Diseases and Epidemiology Online Network (GIDEON) is an online platform for research and clinical support in the fields of Infectious Diseases and Epidemiology. Due to the vast amount of digital data now available from numerous sources worldwide, collecting and collating useful data presents a challenge to medical researchers and public health officials. As of 2026, about 1,500 bacteria, viruses, parasites, prions, and fungi have been discovered, studied, and described by researchers. GIDEON's scientists, physicians, and data experts collect and analyze data on all these pathogens and organize them in a concise, accurate, and usable format. The company's easy-to-use, proprietary software not only allows researchers to read textual summaries but to visualize trends in disease spread, vaccine coverage, and antimicrobial resistance.

== Organization ==
GIDEON consists of five main modules: Explore, Lab, Diagnose, Visualize, and Analyze. The Explore module allows users to analyze GIDEON's vast database and internal analyses of infectious disease cases, surveys, and outbreaks. One can also research various anti-microbial drugs and vaccines. Data can be structured by pathogen, disease, or country. It can be further refined by region, county/province, municipality, strain, and several other criteria. The Lab module allows physicians, students, and public health officials to identify bacteria, mycobacteria, and yeasts by phenotype and several other categories. The Diagnose module, designed by Stephen Berger, MD, utilizes Bayesian analysis to diagnose patients with infectious diseases. This proprietary program is time-tested and has been used successfully by physicians in various health care settings worldwide. It generates a diagnosis by considering geographical indicators, historical data, prior treatments, spatial and temporal distributions of epidemics, and several other criteria. After the data is entered, GIDEON's systems generate a list of all potential diseases and assign a statistical value to each, ranging from the most likely to the least likely. The Visualize module contains an application for generating graphs of disease outbreaks and trends, vaccine coverage, presence of vectors, and disease risk (based on a unique algorithm that takes into account a variety of variables, including shifting weather patterns)

Additional options allow users to add data (in their own font/language) relevant to their institution, electronic patient charts, material from the internet, important telephone numbers, drug prices, antimicrobial resistance patterns, etc. This form of custom data is particularly useful when running GIDEON on institutional networks. The data in GIDEON are derived from:

- all peer-reviewed journals in the fields of infectious diseases, pediatrics, internal medicine, tropical medicine, travel medicine, antimicrobial pharmacology, and clinical microbiology
- a daily electronic literature search based on all relevant keywords
- all available health ministry reports (both printed and electronic)
- standard texts
- abstracts of major meetings

Internal analyses in GIDEON are created by in-house experts who include:

- Physicians
- Epidemiologists
- Computer scientists
- Certified medical writers

Historical data is doubly reviewed by:

- Physicians
- On-staff historian
