= Aristarche =

Greek mythological figure

Aristarche is a Greek mythological figure said by Strabo (60 BC – 20 AD) to have been an Ephesian woman of rank who went with the Phocaean colonists to Massalia, where she became a priestess of Artemis in the newly built temple.

== Legend ==
Before sailing to Gaul, the Phocaean colonists were told by an oracle to take a guide from Artemis of Ephesus, and thus they stopped in Ephesus. There, the goddess appeared in a dream to Aristarche, one of the most esteemed women in the region, and instructed her to go with the Phocaeans taking a statue from the temple with her, in order to establish a new cult in Massalia. Thus she presented herself to the Phocaean colonists and embarked with them to Gaul, carrying religious objects in order to found a temple dedicated to Artemis.

On arriving at Massalia, the Phocaeans erected the temple to Artemis of Ephesus and honored Aristarche by making her the priestess.

This explains the mention of an Ephesion (a temple dedicated to Artemis of Ephesus) dedicated to the goddess at Marseilles in Strabo's version. For according to Strabo, in Massilia is a replica of Ephesion.
