= Parc du 26e Centenaire =

Park in Marseille, France

Coordinates: 43.2802°N 5.3958°E

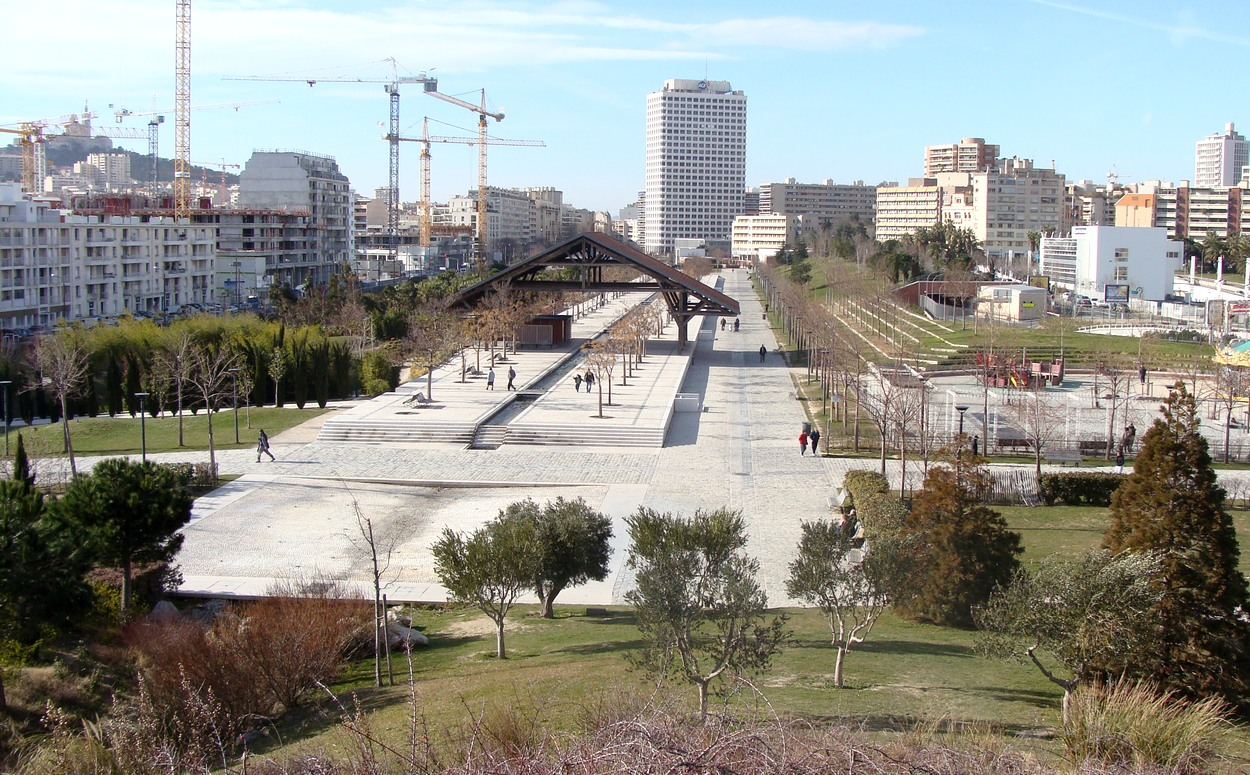
General view of the park

The Parc du 26e Centenaire (English: 26th Centenary Park; Occitan: Parc del 26en Centenari) is a public park located in the 8th arrondissement of Marseille, France. It is listed by the French Ministry of Culture as one of the Remarkable Gardens of France.

== Description ==
The eighteen-hectare garden features a large fountain, a canal with twenty-six fountains, and a long paved terrace, which was once a railroad platform.

On the south side of the park, there are four separate gardens:

- The Provençal garden, laid out on terraces, which contains the examples of the aromatic plants of Provence.
- The African Garden, with sand dunes, and a basin of aquatic and semiaquatic plants.
- The Arab-Andalousian Garden, with palm trees, a canal, and a fountain.
- An English landscape park is organized around a 3000 square metre lake, overlooked by a belvedere, from which it is possible to see the hills of Saint-Cyr and the basilica of Notre-Dame de la Garde. It also contains the terraces which formerly held the tracks for arriving trains, which have been turned into a rose garden.

Other sections of the park contain a playground for children and a cafe.

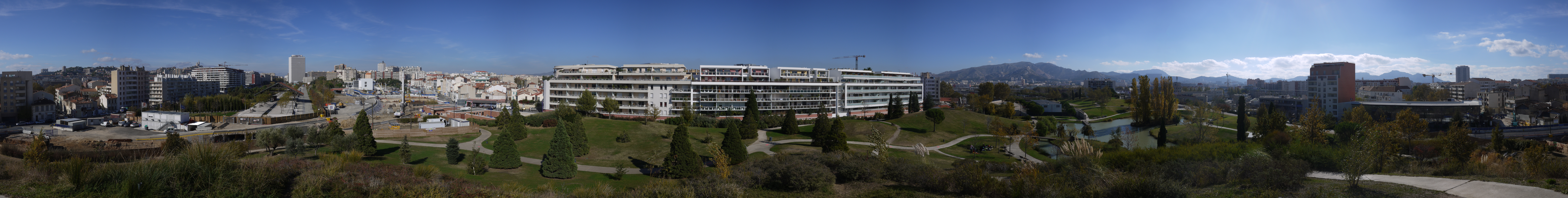
Panoramic view of the park

== History ==
The park is located on the site of the Gare du Prado, a former railway station, built in the 1860s. By the middle of the 20th century, the station was little used. The land was purchased by the city of Marseille in 1998. The city planted 6500 bushes and 1500 trees to decorate the park.
