= Robert Tally =

21st-century American writer and literary critic

Robert T. Tally Jr.
- Born: April 17, 1969 (age 57); Chapel Hill, North Carolina, US

Academic background
- Education: Duke University (AB, JD); University of Pittsburgh (MA, PhD)

Academic work
- Discipline: Literature; Philosophy
- Sub-discipline: Critical Theory
- Institutions: Texas State University
- Website: faculty.txstate.edu/profile/1922030

Robert T. Tally Jr. is a professor of English at Texas State University. His research and teaching focuses on the relations among space, narrative, and representation, particularly in U.S. and comparative literature. He is active in the emerging scholarly fields of geocriticism, literary geography, and the spatial humanities. Tally is the editor of "Geocriticism and Spatial Literary Studies," a Palgrave Macmillan book series established in 2013, the translator of Bertrand Westphal's Geocriticism: Real and Fictional Spaces and the editor of Geocritical Explorations. In addition to his numerous essays on literature, criticism, and theory, Tally has written books on Herman Melville, Edgar Allan Poe, Kurt Vonnegut, and J.R.R. Tolkien's The Hobbit, as well as a critical introduction to the work of literary critic and theorist Fredric Jameson.

Tally received an M.A. in literature and Ph.D. in critical and cultural studies from the University of Pittsburgh, a J.D. from the Duke University School of Law, and an A.B. (philosophy) from Duke University.

== Books ==
- Geocritical Cosmopolitanism: Space, Literature, and the Sense of the Global. London: Routledge, 2026.
- The Mismeasure of Orcs: A Critical Reassessment of Tolkien's Demonized Creatures. Jefferson, NC: McFarland, 2025.
- The Fiction of Dread: Dystopia, Monstrosity, and Apocalypse. New York: Bloomsbury, 2024.
- Representing Middle-earth: Tolkien, Form, and Ideology. Jefferson, NC: McFarland, 2024.
- The Critical Situation: Vexed Perspectives in Postmodern Literary Studies. London: Anthem Press, 2023.
- For a Ruthless Critique of All That Exists: Literature in An Age of Capitalist Realism. Winchester: Zer0 Books, 2022.
- J.R.R. Tolkien's 'The Hobbit': Realizing History Through Fantasy (A Critical Companion). New York: Palgrave, 2022.
- Topophrenia: Place, Narrative, and the Spatial Imagination. Bloomington: Indiana University Press, 2019.
- Fredric Jameson: The Project of Dialectical Criticism. London: Pluto Press, 2014.
- Poe and the Subversion of American Literature: Satire, Fantasy, Critique. New York: Bloomsbury, 2014.
- Spatiality. The New Critical Idiom. London: Routledge, 2013.
- Utopia in the Age of Globalization: Space, Representation, and the World System. New York: Palgrave Macmillan, 2013.
- Kurt Vonnegut and the American Novel: A Postmodern Iconography. London: Continuum, 2011.
- Melville, Mapping and Globalization: Literary Cartography in the American Baroque Writer. London: Continuum, 2009.

== Edited collections and special issues ==
- The Future of Totality: Fredric Jameson and the Prospects of Critical Theory (co-editor, with Nicholas Brown, Maria Elisa Cevasco, and Fabio Akcelrud Durão). Durham: Duke University Press, 2026.
- 'The Political Unconscious'—40 Years On (co-editor with Andrew Cole). Special focus section of PMLA 137.3 (May 2022).
- Affective Geographies and Narratives of Chinese Diaspora (co-editor, with Melody Yunzi Li). New York: Palgrave Macmillan, 2022.
- Spatial Literary Studies in China (co-editor, with Ying Fang). New York: Palgrave Macmillan, 2022.
- Spatial Literary Studies: Interdisciplinary Approaches to Space, Geography, and the Imagination (editor). London: Routledge, 2020.
- Teaching Space, Place, and Literature (editor). London: Routledge, 2018.
- The Routledge Handbook of Literature and Space (editor). London: Routledge, 2017.
- Ecocriticism and Geocriticism: Overlapping Territories in Environmental and Spatial Literary Studies (co-editor, with Christine M. Battista). New York: Palgrave Macmillan, 2016.
- The Geocritical Legacies of Edward W. Said: Spatiality, Critical Humanism, and Comparative Literature (editor). New York: Palgrave Macmillan, 2015.
- Literary Cartographies: Spatiality, Representation, and Narrative (editor). New York: Palgrave Macmillan, 2014.
- Spatial Literary Studies (editor), special issue of Reconstruction: Studies in Contemporary Culture 14.3 (2014).
- Kurt Vonnegut (editor). Critical Insights. Ipswich, MA: Salem Press, 2013.
- Kurt Vonnegut and Humor (co-editor, with Peter C. Kunze), special issue of Studies in American Humor New Series 3, No. 26 (2012).
- Geocritical Explorations: Space, Place and Mapping in Literary and Cultural Studies (editor). New York: Palgrave Macmillan, 2011.
