= Gymnosophists =

Ancient Indian vegetarian ascetics

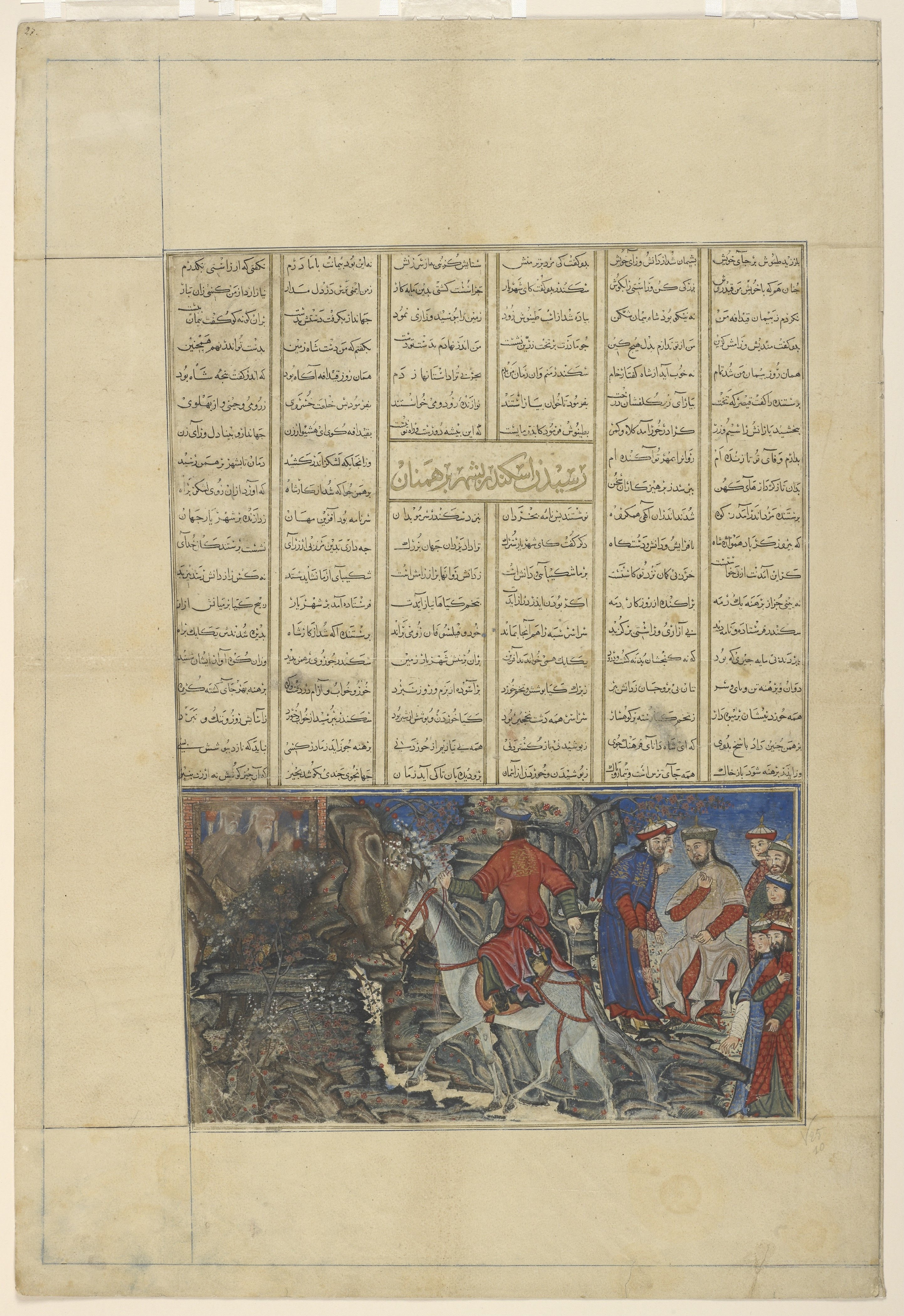
Alexander meets the Gymnosophists. Great Mongol Shahnameh, c. 1335. Arthur M. Sackler Gallery

Gymnosophists (Ancient Greek: γυμνοσοφισταί, gymnosophistaí, i.e. "naked philosophers" or "naked wise men" (from Greek γυμνός gymnós "naked" and σοφία sophía "wisdom")) were ancient Indian philosophers who pursued asceticism to the point of regarding food and clothing as detrimental to purity of thought. They are mentioned several times in Ancient Greek literature.

They are mentioned in association with the Persian magi, the Chaldaeans of the Assyrians and Babylonians, the druids of the Celts, and the priests of Egypt. Some sources claim that famous figures such as Lycurgus, Pythagoras, and Democritus may have met them. They are mentioned by authors such as Philo, Lucian, Clement of Alexandria, Philostratus, and Heliodorus of Emesa. These reports are thought to have served as models to Cynics as well as Christian ascetics. Many authors have discussed the purported questions by Alexander the Great and answers by the Gymnosophists. There were also gymnosophists in Upper Egypt who were called Ethiopian Gymnosophists by Apollonius of Tyana. They were noted to have been vegetarian by several Greek authors.

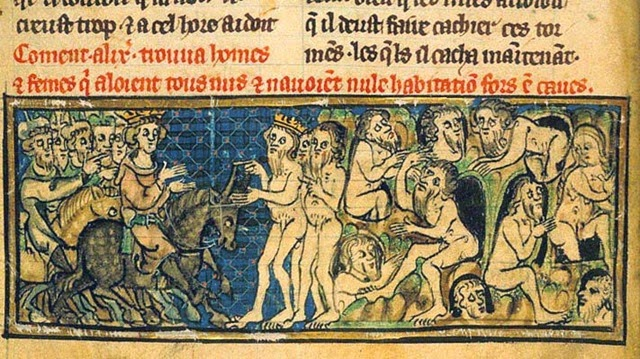
Medieval miniature reproducing the meeting of the gymnosophists with Alexander, c. 1420, Historia de proelis

== Ancient accounts ==
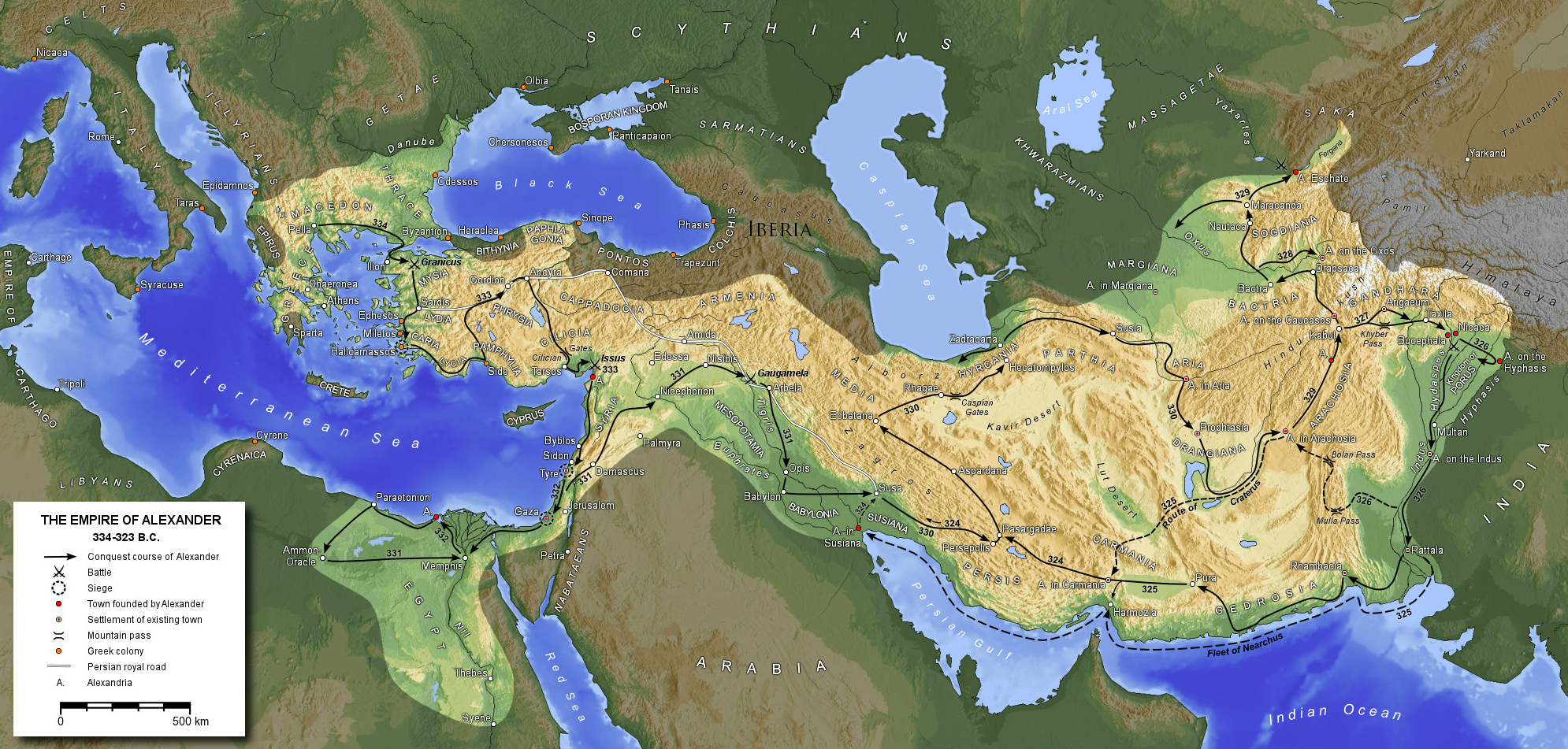
Map of Alexander the Great's empire and his route to India

Plutarch (c. 46–120 CE) describes an encounter by Alexander the Great with ten gymnosophists near the banks of the Indus river in what is now Pakistan.

He (Alexander) captured ten of the gymnosophists who had done most to get Sabbas to revolt, and had made the most trouble for the Macedonians. These philosophers were reputed to be clever and concise in answering questions, and Alexander therefore put difficult questions to them, declaring that he would put to death he who first made an incorrect answer, and then the rest, in an order determined in like manner; and he commanded one of them, the oldest, to be the judge in the contest. The first one, accordingly, being asked which, in his opinion, were more numerous, the living or the dead, said that the living were, since the dead no longer existed. The second, being asked whether the earth or the sea produced larger animals, said the earth did, since the sea was but a part of the earth. The third, being asked what animal was the most cunning, said: "That which up to this time man has not discovered." The fourth, when asked why he had induced Sabbas to revolt, replied: "Because I wished him either to die nobly or live." The fifth, being asked which, in his opinion, was older, day or night, replied: "Day, by one day"; and he added, upon the king expressing dissatisfaction, that unusual questions must have unusual answers. Passing on, then, to the sixth, Alexander asked how a man could be most loved; "If," said the philosopher, "he is most powerful, and yet does not inspire fear." Of the three remaining, he who was asked how one might become a god instead of man, replied: "By doing something which a man cannot do"; the one who was asked which was the stronger, life or death, answered: "Life, since it supports so many ills." And the last, asked how long it were well for a man to live, answered: "Until he does not regard death as better than life." So, then, turning to the judge, Alexander bade him give his opinion. The judge declared that they had answered one worse than another. "Well, then," said Alexander, "thou shalt die first for giving such a verdict." "That cannot be, O King," said the judge, "unless thou falsely saidst that thou wouldst put to death first him who answered worst." These philosophers, then, he dismissed with gifts...

— Plutarch, "Life of Alexander", Parallel Lives, 64–65.

Diogenes Laërtius (fl. 3rd century AD) refers to them, and reports that Pyrrho of Ellis was influenced by the gymnosophists while in India with Alexander the Great, and on his return to Ellis, imitated their habits of life and caused him to found the Hellenistic philosophy of Pyrrhonism.

Strabo (64 or 63 BC – c. AD 24) says that gymnosophists were religious people among the Indians (XVI,I), and otherwise divides Indian philosophers into Brahmanas and Śramaṇas (XV,I,59–60), following the accounts of Megasthenes. He further divides the Sramanas into "Hylobioi" (forest hermits, cf. Aranyaka) and "Physicians".

Of the Sarmanes, the most honourable, he says, are the Hylobii, who live in the forests, and subsist on leaves and wild fruits: they are clothed with garments made of the bark of trees, and abstain from commerce with women and from wine.

— Strabo XV, I,60

Of the Sarmanes ... second in honour to the Hylobii, are the physicians, for they apply philosophy to the study of the nature of man. They are of frugal habits, but do not live in the fields, and subsist upon rice and meal, which every one gives when asked, and receive them hospitably. ... Both this and the other class of persons practise fortitude, as well in supporting active toil as in enduring suffering, so that they will continue a whole day in the same posture, without motion.

— Strabo XV, I,60

Philo Judaeus (c. 20 BCE – c. 50 CE), also called mentions the gymnosophists twice in the course of listing foreign ascetics and philosophers who are, in his estimation, "prudent, and just, and virtuous" and therefore truly free:

And among the Indians there is the class of the gymnosophists, who, in addition to natural philosophy, take great pains in the study of moral science likewise, and thus make their whole existence a sort of lesson in virtue.

— Philo Judaeus, Every Good Man is Free, 74

But it is necessary for us ... to bring forward as corroborative testimonies the lives of some particular good men who are the most undeniable evidences of freedom. Calanus was an Indian by birth, one of the gymnosophists; he, being looked upon as the man who was possessed of the greatest fortitude of all his contemporaries, and that too, not only by his own countrymen, but also by foreigners, which is the rarest of all things, was greatly admired by some kings of hostile countries, because he had combined virtuous actions with praiseworthy language.

— Philo Judaeus, Every Good Man is Free, 92–93

In the 2nd century CE, the Christian theologian Clement of Alexandria distinguishes the gymnosophists, the philosophers of the Indians, from the Sramanas, "the philosophers of the Bactrians":

Philosophy, then, with all its blessed advantages to man, flourished long ages ago among the barbarians, diffusing its light among the gentiles, and eventually penetrated into Greece. Its hierophants were the prophets among the Egyptians, the Chaldeans among the Assyrians, the Druids among the Galatians, the Sramanas of the Bactrians, and the philosophers of the Celts, the Magi among the Persians who announced beforehand the birth of the Saviour, being led by a star until they arrived in the land of Judaea, and among the Indians the Gymnosophists, and other philosophers of barbarous nations.

— Clement of Alexandria, Stromata 1.15.71 (ed. Colon. 1688 p. 305, A, B)

Porphyry in the Peri Apoches gives a description of the Indian philosophers’ diet structured around the distinction between two kinds of gymnosophists: the "Brahmins" and the "Samaneans". The Brahmins are described as theosophoi by descent. They are vegetarians and eat only fruit, yogurt and rice. They are independent from the king and devote all their time to the worship. "Samaneans" probably refers to Buddhist monks from Bactria. They become philosophers by choice and may descend from any Indian caste. When they become Samaneans, they renounce all their possessions and shave the superfluous hair on their body. They live in communities and spend their time in debates about the divine.

== Classification ==
=== Indian ===
The philosophical, religious, and tribal identities of the gymnosophists that the Greeks encountered in the 3rd century BC at the town of Taxila in Ancient India were not preserved in the ancient Greek literature, leading to much modern speculation. The following have been proposed as non-mutually exclusive possibilities.

==== Brahmin ====
Some sects of Brahmins belonging to Hinduism remained naked, lived in forests, practiced austerities, shaved their heads, ate only fruit and milk and meditated.

==== Ājīvika ====
The Ājīvika went without clothes. Their antinomian ethics match those Pyrrho brought back to Greece from his meetings with the gymnosophists.

==== Digambara ====
Some scholars believe that gymnospohists were Digambaras. However, further analysis of the way in which Kalanos killed himself by violently jumping into a funeral pyre (as in Strabo's) shows that gymnosophists weren't completely non-violent and that it is unlikely that they were Jain monks at all. The only three ways of peaceful suicide as described in Śvetāmbara literature are generally accepted and self-immolation is not one of them.

==== Naga sadhu ====
The Naga sadhus ("naked saints") have been identified with the gymnosophists by some modern writers: they are historically known to carry arms, and learn martial arts which are promoted in their akharas. They move totally naked except for the arms they carry. The Naga sadhus (Note: They own several akharas and their movements were also of concern to the British, who always kept a watchful eye on them.) are often called Indian gymnosophists. They are mostly worshipers of Shiva and carry Trishula, swords and other weapons and have been known to take up arms to defend their faith.

=== Ethiopian ===
The school of naked philosophers in upper Egypt was visited by the Neopythagorean philosopher Apollonius of Tyana (c. 15 – c. 100 AD) who called them Ethiopian Gymnosophists. Apollonius had met the gymnosophists of India before his arrival in Egypt, and repeatedly compared the Ethiopian Gymnosophists to them. He regarded them to be derived from the Indians. They lived without any cottages nor houses, but had a shelter for the visitors. They did not wear any clothes and thus compared themselves to the Olympian athletes. They shared their vegetarian meal with him.

== See also ==
- Bragmanni – A mythical race in medieval European anthropogeography
- Brahmin – Varna in Hinduism, one of four castes
- Buddhist monasticism – Buddhist community (sangha) principles
- Kalanos – Indian philosopher (c. 398–323 BCE)
- Dandamis – Indian philosopher of the 4th century BC
- Grazers (Christianity) – Category of hermits and anchorites
- Guru – Spiritual teacher and guide
- Gymnosophy – Former philosophical movement
- Hindu monasticism – Hindu monastery
- Jain monasticism – Order of monks and nuns in the Jain community
- Muni (saint) – Ancient Indian sages and hermits or ancient Indian ascetics
- Pyrrho – Greek philosopher and founder of Pyrrhonism (c. 360 – c. 270 BC)
- Rishi – Sanskrit term for a sage in Indian religions
- Sadhu – Religious ascetic or holy person in Hinduism
- Sant (religion) – Truth-exemplar in Indian religions
- Śramaṇa – Monastic orders
- Swami – Honorific title for Hindu monks; Indian surname
- Yogi – Practitioner of Yoga
- Zarmanochegas – 1st century BC Indian philosopher and monk
