= Chares of Mytilene =

Greek belonging to the court of Alexander the Great

Chares of Mytilene (Ancient Greek: Χάρης ὁ Μυτιληναῖος) was a Greek belonging to the court of Alexander the Great. He was appointed court-marshal or introducer of strangers to the king, an office borrowed from the Persian court. He wrote a history of Alexander in ten books, dealing mainly with the private life of the king. The fragments are chiefly preserved in Athenaeus. These fragments are largely concerned with court ceremonies and personal gossip, including a description of Alexander's introduction of the Persian custom of proskynesis to his court.

See Scriptores Rerum Alexandri (pp. 114–120) in the Didot edition of Arrian.
