= Outline of India =

Country in the Indian subcontinent in South Asia

The flag of India

The Emblem of India

Orthographic projection of India.

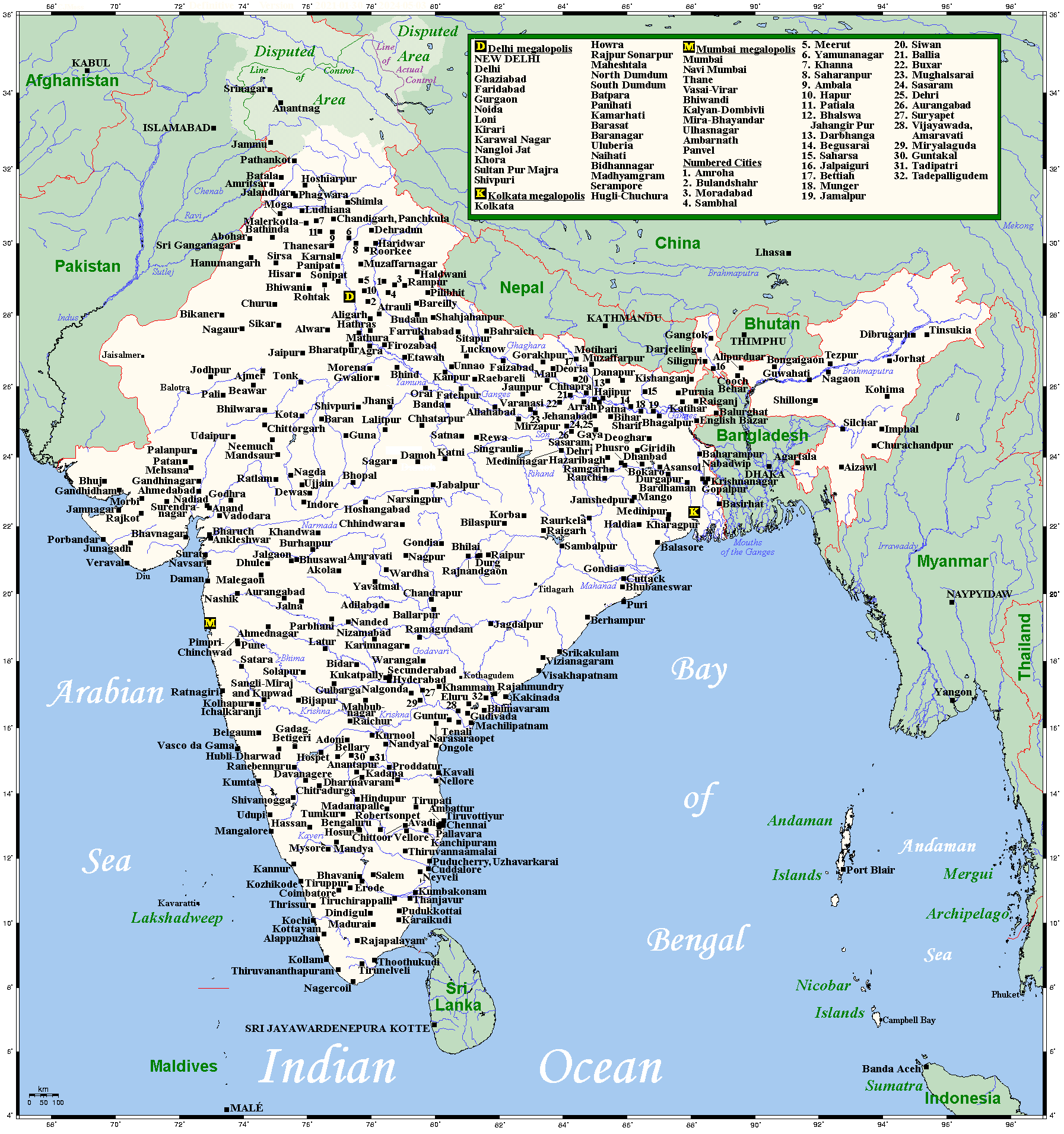
An enlargeable map of the cities of India

The following outline is provided as an overview of and topical guide to India:

Republic of India – the seventh-largest country by area, located on the Indian subcontinent in South Asia. India was home to the ancient Indus Valley Civilisation, and is the birthplace of four major world religions: Hinduism, Sikhism, Buddhism, Jainism. It is also home to followers of Islam, Christianity, Judaism, Zoroastrianism.. From 1857 to 1947, India was under British rule. India became an independent nation in 1947 after a struggle for independence, and underwent a violent partition, which split the erstwhile British Raj into the independent countries of India and Pakistan, (with East Pakistan rebelling against Pakistan in 1971 to form Bangladesh). As of June 2025, India is the most populous country in the world, with a population exceeding 1.4 billion. It is recognised as the world's largest democracy by population and has emerged as the fourth-largest economy globally.

== General reference ==
An enlargeable basic map of India

- Pronunciation: /ˈɪndiə/
- Common English country name: India
- Official English country name: The Republic of India
- Common endonym(s): Bharat, Hindustan
- Official endonym(s): Bharat Ganarajya
- Adjectival(s): Indian
- Demonym(s): Indian
- Etymology: Names of India
- International rankings of India
- ISO country codes: IN, IND, 356
- ISO region codes: See ISO 3166-2:IN
- Internet country code top-level domain: .in

== Geography of India ==
India covers an area of 3,287,263 sq. km, extending from the snow-covered Himalayas in the north to the tropical rainforests in the south. Bounded by the Great Himalayas in the north, the country stretches southward and tapers into the Indian Ocean at the Tropic of Cancer, flanked by the Bay of Bengal to the east and the Arabian Sea to the west.

Lying entirely in the Northern Hemisphere, India’s mainland spans latitudes 8°4' to 37°6' N and longitudes 68°7' to 97°25' E. It measures about 3,214 km from north to south and approximately 2,933 km from east to west. The land frontier is about 15,200 km long, and the total coastline; including the mainland, Lakshadweep, and Andaman & Nicobar Islands is 7,516.6 km.

India shares borders with Pakistan to the northwest; China, Bhutan, and Nepal to the north; Myanmar to the east; and Bangladesh to the east of West Bengal. Sri Lanka lies to the south, separated by the Palk Strait and the Gulf of Mannar.

- India is:
  - a subcontinent
  - a country
    - a megadiverse country
- Area of India: 3,287,263 km^{2} (1,269,219 sq mi) – 7th largest country
- Location:
  - Eastern Hemisphere
  - Northern Hemisphere
    - Eurasia
      - Asia
        - Greater India
        - South Asia
          - Indian subcontinent
  - Time zone: Indian Standard Time (UTC+05:30)
  - Bordering Countries:

Afghanistan 106 km
Bangladesh 4,053 km
China 3,380 km including the territorial disputes along its border; McMahon Line
Pakistan 2,912 km including the Line of Control
Nepal 1,690 km
Myanmar 1,463 km
Bhutan 605 km

=== Physical divisions of India ===
Based on these macro variations, India can be divided into the following physiographic divisions:

1. The Northern and North-eastern Mountains - The North and Northeastern Mountains consist of the Himalayas and the Northeastern hills. Some important ranges are Great Himalayan Range(includes Greater Himalayas, Himadri; the Lesser Himalayas, Himachal and the Outer Himalayas, Shiwalik), Karakoram ranges and the northeast mountain ranges.
2. The Northern Plain - Located south of the Himalayas, the northern plains are formed by the deposition of sediments from Himalayan rivers Indus, Ganga and Brahmaputra. It is further divided intro Babhar, Tarai, Alluvial plains further dividing into Khadar & Bhangar.
3. The Peninsular Plateau - Rising from the height of 150 m above the river plains up to an elevation of 600-900 m is the irregular triangle known as the Peninsular plateau. It is one of the oldest and the most stable landmass of India. Delhi ridge in the northwest, (extension of Aravalis), the Rajmahal hills in the east, Gir range in the west and the Cardamom hills in the south constitute the outer extent of the Peninsular plateau. However, an extension of this is also seen in the northeast, in the form of Shillong and Karbi-Anglong plateau. It is made up of series of patland plateaus such as the Hazaribagh plateau, the Palamu plateau, the Ranchi plateau, the Malwa plateau, the Coimbatore plateau and the Karnataka plateau, etc. On the basis of the prominent relief features, the Peninsular plateau can be divided into three broad groups: (i) The Deccan Plateau (ii) The Central Highlands (iii) The Northeastern Plateau.
4. The Indian Desert - To the northwest of the Aravali hills lies the Great Indian desert also known as Thar Desert.
5. The Coastal Plains - It is broadly classified into Eastern coastal plains and Western coastal plains
6. The Islands - There are two major island groups in India; one in the Bay of Bengal named Andaman & Nicobar Islands and the other in the Arabian Sea named Lakshadweep.

=== Geographic features of India ===
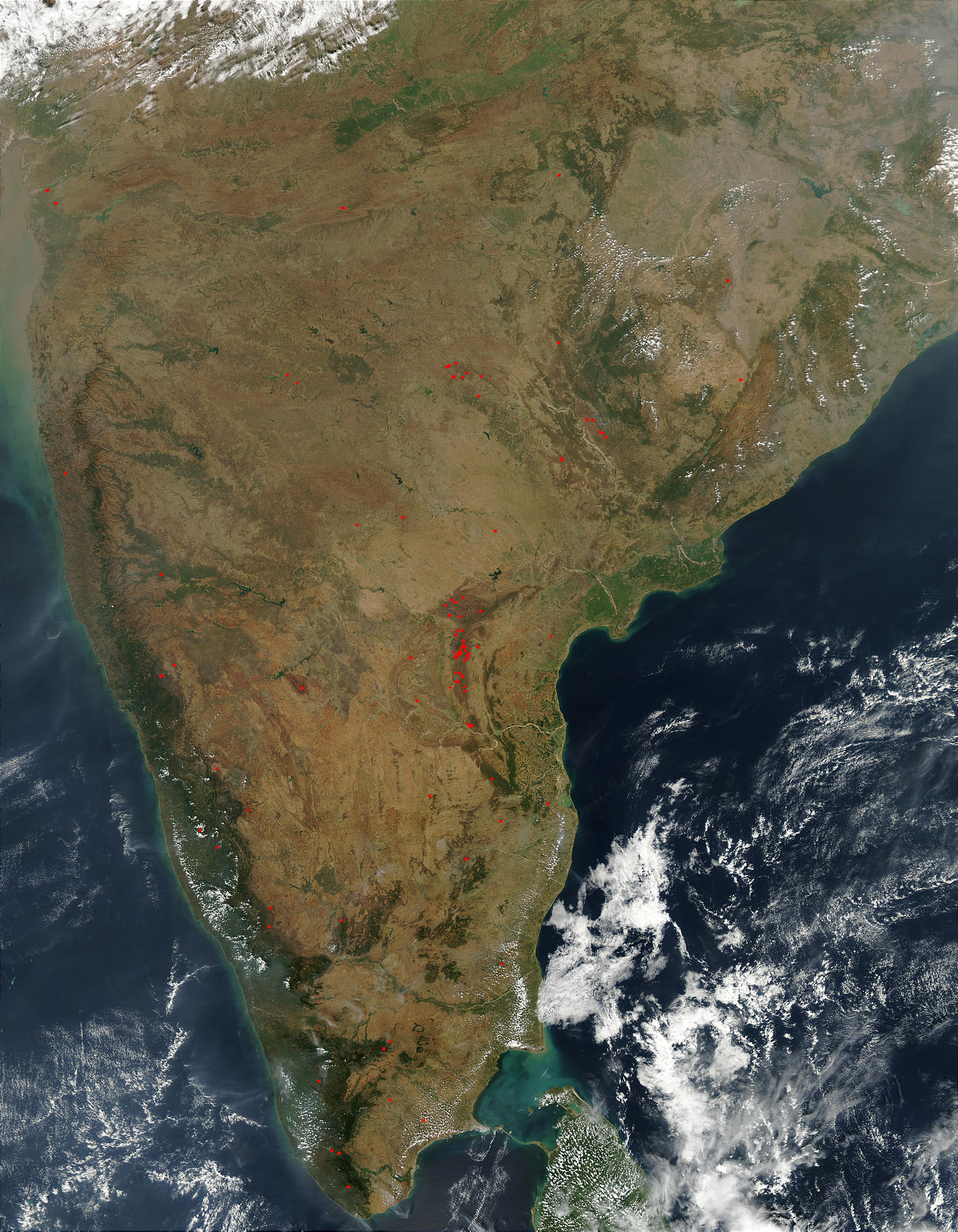
South India satellite view

- North India
  - Northwest India
  - Northeast India
- East India
- South India
- West India
- Central India

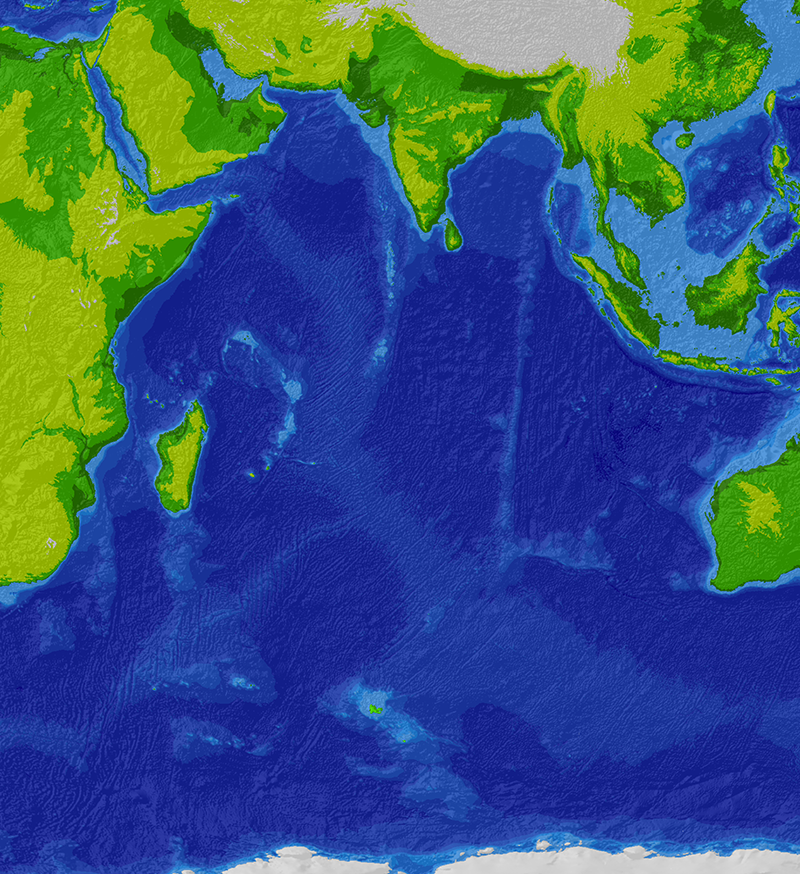
Indian Ocean bathymetry SRTM

- Extreme points of India
  - High: Kangchenjunga 8,586 m (28,169 ft) – third highest peak on Earth
  - Low: Kuttanad −2.2 m (−7 ft)
- Population of India: 1,463,526,271 as of 21 June 2025 - Most populous country.
  - Census of India
- Atlas of India

=== Environment of India ===
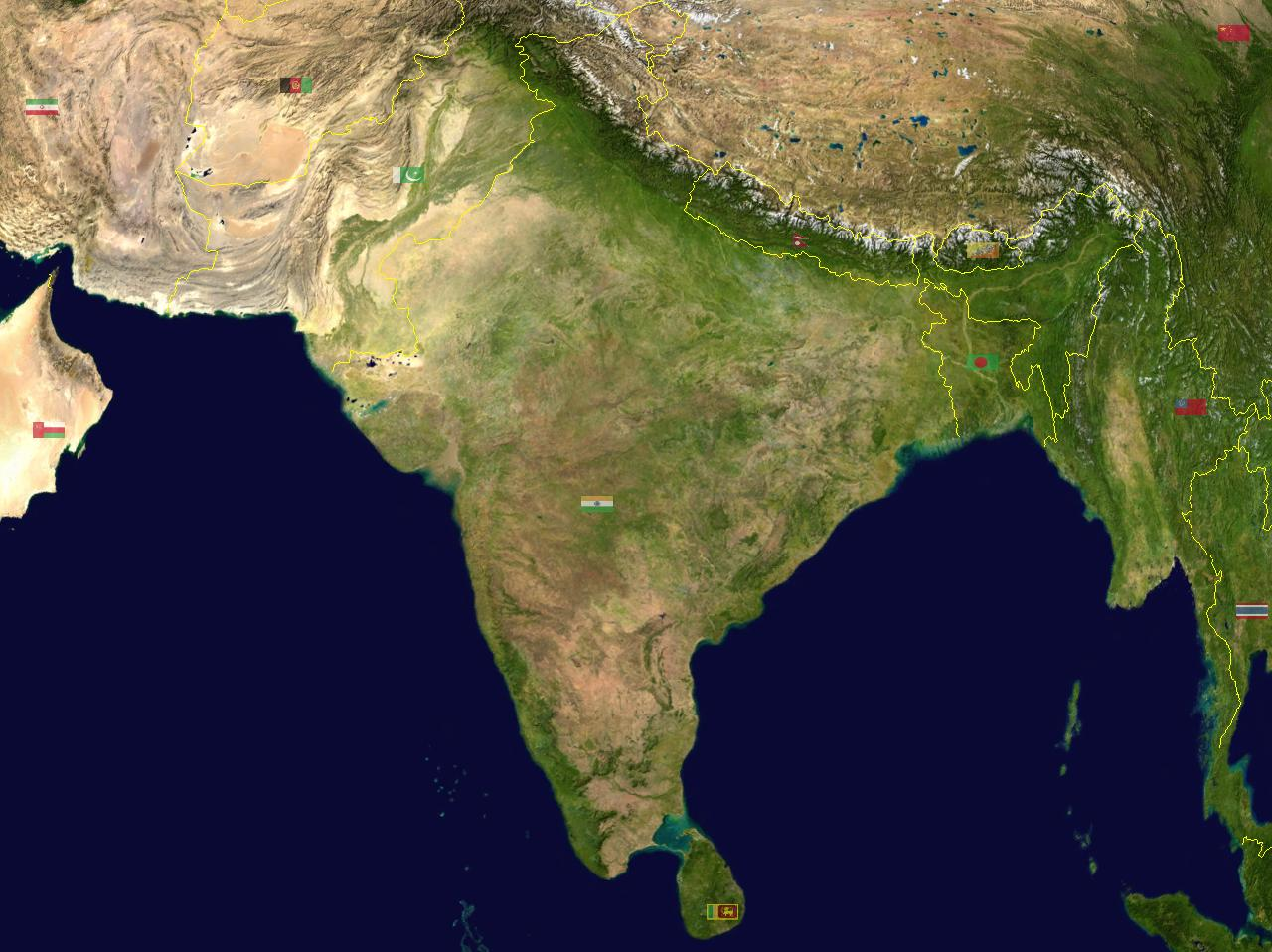
An enlargeable satellite composite image of India

- Climate of India
  - Climate change in India
- Ecoregions of India
  - Wildlife of India
    - Flora of India
    - Fauna of India
      - Birds of India
      - Mammals of India
  - Protected areas of India
    - National parks of India
  - Environmental issues in India
- Geology of India
  - List of mountains in India/Orography of India
- Renewable energy in India
  - Solar power in India
  - Wind power in India
- Beaches of India
- Glaciers of India
- Islands of India
- Lakes of India
- Mountains of India
  - Volcanoes of India
- Rivers of India
  - Waterfalls of India
- Valleys of India
- List of World Heritage Sites in India

==== Administrative divisions of India ====
Administrative divisions of India

===== Administrative divisional structure of India =====
Structure of administrative divisions in India

Republic of India
States | Union Territories
Divisions
Districts
Blocks (Tehsils/Talukas/Mandals) | Municipal Corporations (MahanagarPalika/ NagarNigam) | Municipalities (Nagar-Palika) | City Councils (Nagar-Panchayat)
Villages (Gram/Gaon) | Wards

===== States and union territories of India =====
A clickable map of the 28 states and 8 union territories of India

Map legend: States (1–28) & Union territories (A-H)
| 1. Andhra Pradesh | 13. Madhya Pradesh | 25. Tripura |
| 2. Arunachal Pradesh | 14. Maharashtra | 26. Uttar Pradesh |
| 3. Assam | 15. Manipur | 27. Uttarakhand |
| 4. Bihar | 16. Meghalaya | 28. West Bengal |
| 5. Chhattisgarh | 17. Mizoram | A. Andaman and Nicobar Islands |
| 6. Goa | 18. Nagaland | B. Chandigarh |
| 7. Gujarat | 19. Odisha | C. Dadra and Nagar Haveli and Daman and Diu |
| 8. Haryana | 20. Punjab | D. Jammu and Kashmir |
| 9. Himachal Pradesh | 21. Rajasthan | E. Ladakh |
| 10. Jharkhand | 22. Sikkim | F. Lakshadweep |
| 11. Karnataka | 23. Tamil Nadu | G. Delhi |
| 12. Kerala | 24.Telangana | H. Puducherry |

States and union territories of India

- Autonomous regions of India
- Emblems of Indian states
- States and union territories of India
  - By name
    - States by name
      - Andhra Pradesh (outline)
      - Arunachal Pradesh (outline)
      - Assam (outline)
      - Bihar (outline)
      - Chhattisgarh (outline)
      - Goa (outline)
      - Gujarat (outline)
      - Haryana (outline)
      - Himachal Pradesh (outline)
      - Jharkhand (outline)
      - Karnataka (outline)
      - Kerala (outline)
      - Madhya Pradesh (outline)
      - Maharashtra (outline)
      - Manipur (outline)
      - Meghalaya (outline)
      - Mizoram (outline)
      - Nagaland (outline)
      - Odisha (outline)
      - Punjab (outline)
      - Rajasthan (outline)
      - Sikkim (outline)
      - Tamil Nadu (outline)
      - Telangana (outline)
      - Tripura (outline)
      - Uttar Pradesh (outline)
      - Uttarakhand (outline)
      - West Bengal (outline)
    - Union territories by name
      - Andaman and Nicobar Islands
      - Chandigarh
      - Dadra and Nagar Haveli and Daman and Diu
      - Delhi
      - Jammu and Kashmir
      - Ladakh
      - Lakshadweep
      - Puducherry
  - By rank
    - By economic rank
    - By various rankings
  - By population
  - By population density
  - By size
  - By state code
- State and territory capitals

===== Divisions of India =====
- Divisions of Andhra Pradesh
- Divisions of Arunachal Pradesh
- Divisions of Assam
- Divisions of Bihar
- Divisions of Chhattisgarh
- Divisions of Goa
- Divisions of Gujarat
- Divisions of Haryana
- Divisions of Himachal Pradesh
- Divisions of Jammu and Kashmir
- Divisions of Jharkhand
- Divisions of Karnataka
- Divisions of Kerala
- Divisions of Madhya Pradesh
- Divisions of Maharashtra
- Divisions of Manipur
- Divisions of Meghalaya
- Divisions of Mizoram
- Divisions of Nagaland
- Divisions of Odisha
- Divisions of Punjab
- Divisions of Rajasthan
- Divisions of Sikkim
- Divisions of Tamil Nadu
- Divisions of Telangana
- Divisions of Tripura
- Divisions of Uttar Pradesh
- Divisions of Uttarakhand
- Divisions of West Bengal
- Divisions of Delhi

===== Municipalities of India =====
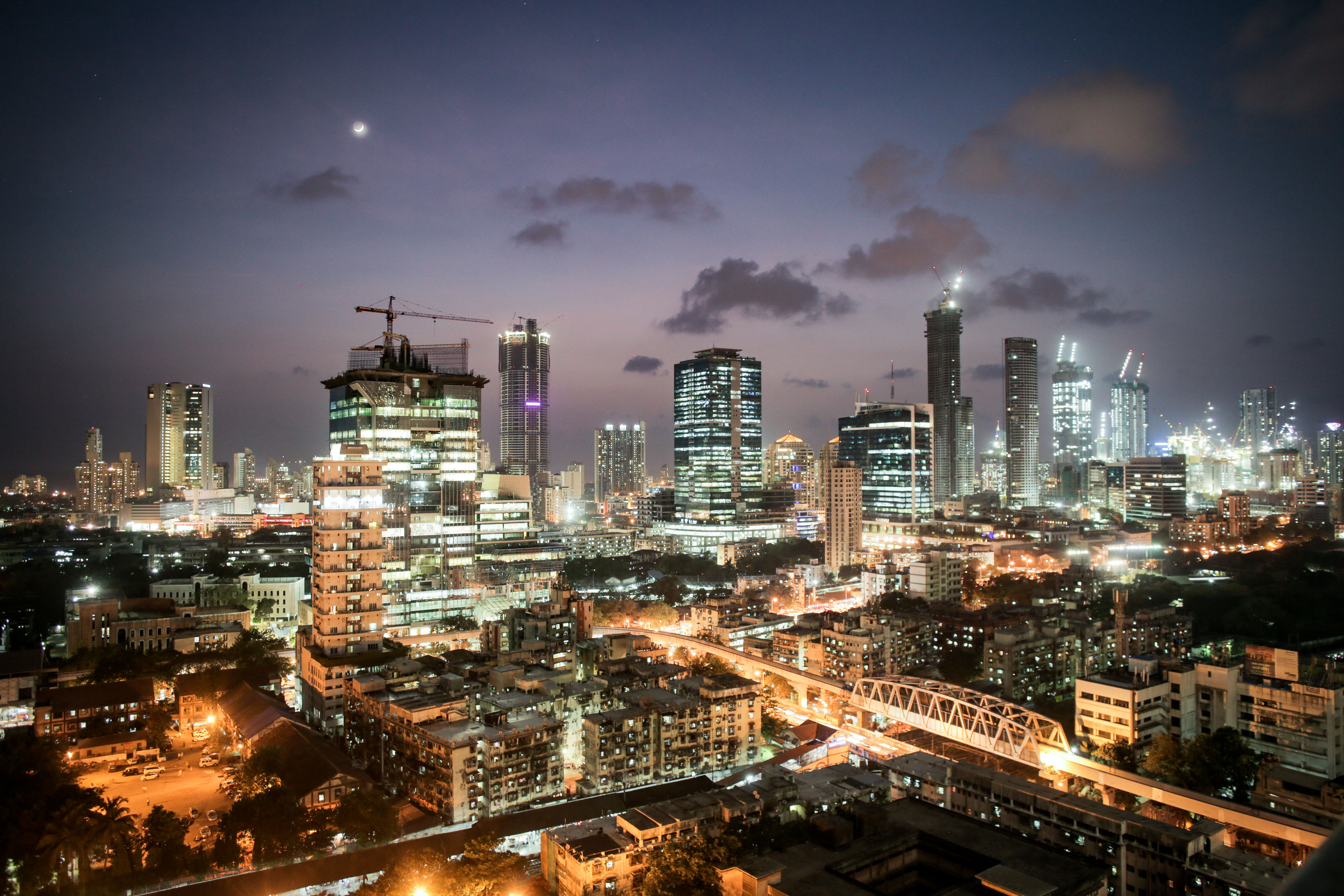
Mumbai skyline

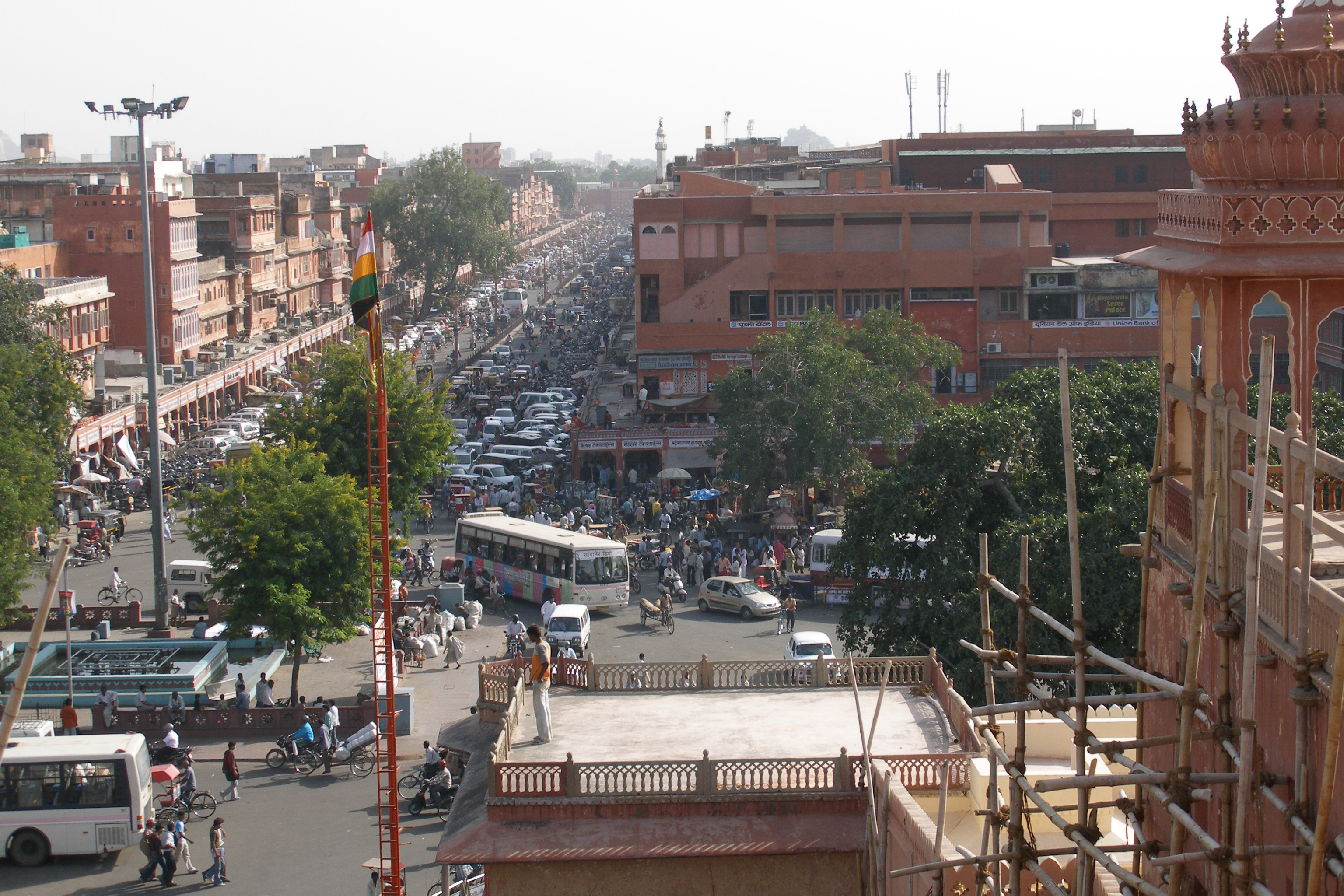

Municipalities of India

- Cities in India
  - National Capital of India: New Delhi
  - Financial Capital of India: Mumbai
  - Cultural Capital of India: Kolkata
  - Manchester of India: Ahmedabad
  - City of Diamond: Surat
  - Detroit of Asia: Chennai
  - Milk city of India: Anand
  - Silicon Valley of India: Bangalore
  - Ceramic Capital of India: Morbi
  - City of Nawabs: Lucknow
  - Pink City of India: Jaipur
  - Big cities in North East India
  - List of city and town nicknames in India
  - Million-plus cities in India
  - Most populous cities in India

=== Geography of states and territories ===
1. Geography of Andaman and Nicobar
2. Geography of Andhra Pradesh
3. Geography of Arunachal Pradesh
4. Geography of Assam
5. Geography of Bihar
6. Geography of Chandigarh
7. Geography of Chhattisgarh
8. Geography of Dadra and Nagar Haveli and Daman and Diu
9. Geography of Delhi
10. Geography of Goa
11. Geography of Gujarat
12. Geography of Haryana
13. Geography of Himachal Pradesh
14. Geography of Jammu and Kashmir
15. Geography of Jharkhand
16. Geography of Karnataka
17. Geography of Kerala
18. Geography of Ladakh
19. Geography of Lakshadweep
20. Geography of Madhya Pradesh
21. Geography of Maharashtra
22. Geography of Manipur
23. Geography of Meghalaya
24. Geography of Mizoram
25. Geography of Nagaland
26. Geography of Odisha
27. Geography of Puducherry
28. Geography of Punjab
29. Geography of Rajasthan
30. Geography of Sikkim
31. Geography of Tamil Nadu
32. Geography of Telangana
33. Geography of Tripura
34. Geography of Uttar Pradesh
35. Geography of Uttarakhand
36. Geography of West Bengal

== Demography of India ==
Demographics of India

- Ethnic groups of India
- Racial groups of India
- Religion of India

=== Demographics of states and territories ===
1. Demographics of Andaman and Nicobar
2. Demographics of Andhra Pradesh
3. Demographics of Arunachal Pradesh
4. Demographics of Assam
5. Demographics of Bihar
6. Demographics of Chandigarh
7. Demographics of Chhattisgarh
8. Demographics of Dadra and Nagar Haveli and Daman and Diu
9. Demographics of Delhi
10. Demographics of Goa
11. Demographics of Gujarat
12. Demographics of Haryana
13. Demographics of Himachal Pradesh
14. Demographics of Jammu and Kashmir
15. Demographics of Jharkhand
16. Demographics of Karnataka
17. Demographics of Kerala
18. Demographics of Ladakh
19. Demographics of Lakshadweep
20. Demographics of Madhya Pradesh
21. Demographics of Maharashtra
22. Demographics of Manipur
23. Demographics of Meghalaya
24. Demographics of Mizoram
25. Demographics of Nagaland
26. Demographics of Odisha
27. Demographics of Puducherry
28. Demographics of Punjab
29. Demographics of Rajasthan
30. Demographics of Sikkim
31. Demographics of Tamil Nadu
32. Demographics of Tripura
33. Demographics of Uttar Pradesh
34. Demographics of Uttarakhand
35. Demographics of West Bengal

== Government and politics of India ==
Current seat distribution in the Indian parliament (as of 2024)

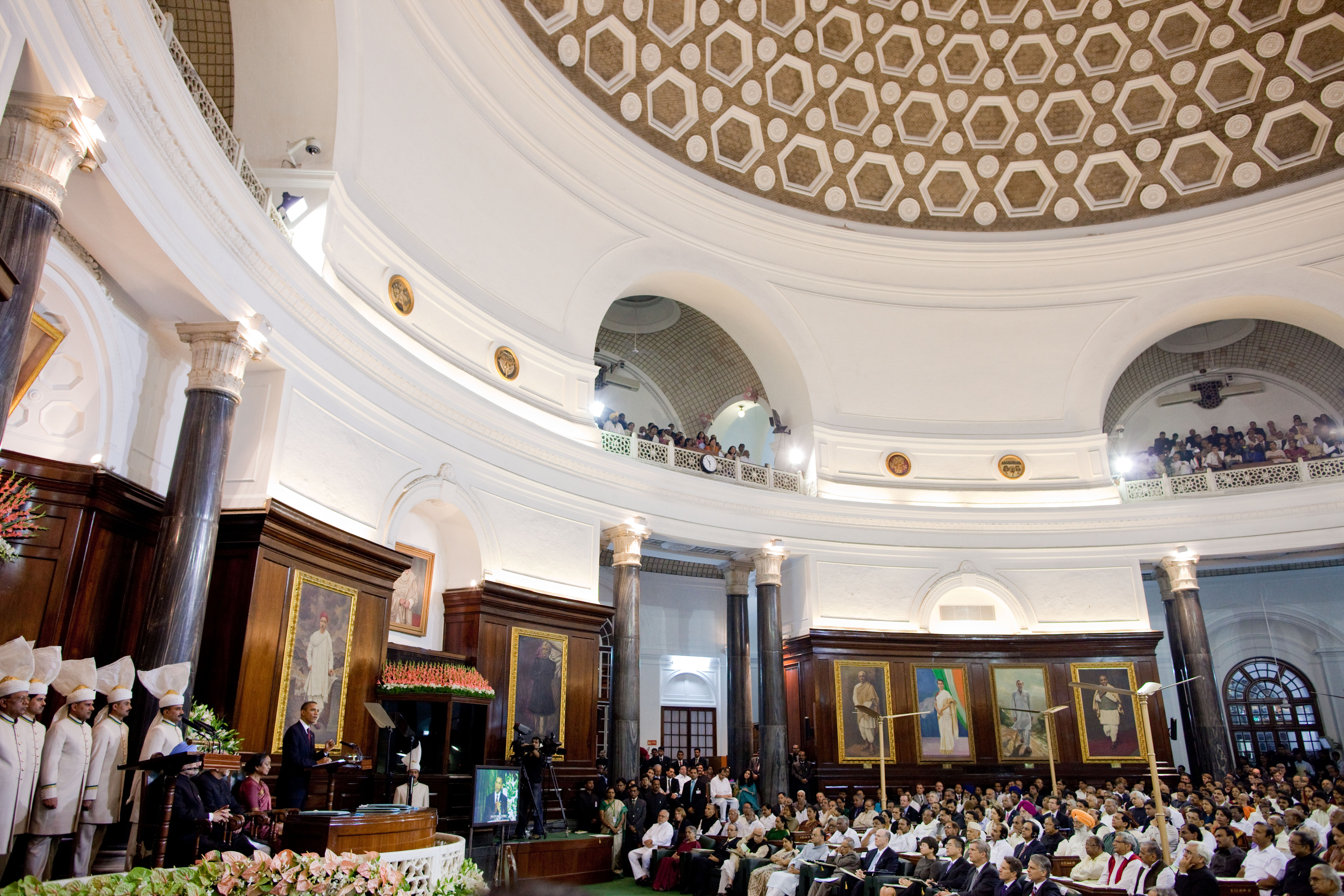
Barack Obama addressing the Indian Parliament

- Form of government: Sovereign socialist secular federal parliamentary multi-party representative democratic republic.
  - Sovereign – this means an independent nation.
  - Socialist – this implies social and economic equality for all Indian citizens. This guarantees equal opportunity and equal social status. The government attempts to reduce economic inequality by reducing concentration of wealth.
  - Secular – practices separation of religion and state. This implies freedom to choose one's religion. The state gives every citizen the right to practice and propagate a religion of his choice, and also right to reject all religions. The state treats all religions as equal and there is no official state religion.
  - Democratic – this means the government is democratically elected, and the head of the government (prime minister) is elected by the people.
  - Republic – this means the head of the state (president) is not a hereditary monarch but indirectly elected by the people.
- Capital of India: New Delhi
- Elections in India
  - 1951 | 1957 | 1962 | 1967 | 1971 | 1977 | 1980 | 1984 | 1989 | 1991 | 1996 | 1998 | 1999 | 2004 | 2009 | 2014 | 2019 | 2024
- Political parties in India
  - Aam Aadmi Party
  - All India Trinamool Congress
  - Bahujan Samaj Party
  - Bharatiya Janata Party
  - Communist Party of India
  - Communist Party of India (Marxist)
  - Dravidian parties
    - Dravida Munnetra Kazhagam
    - All India Anna Dravida Munnetra Kazhagam
  - Indian National Congress
  - Janata Dal (United)
  - Janata Dal (Secular)
  - Nationalist Congress Party
  - Samajwadi Party
  - Shiromani Akali Dal
  - Shivsena
  - Rashtriya Janata Dal
  - Telugu Desam Party
  - Bharat Rashtra Samithi
  - Yuvajana Sramika Rythu Congress Party YSRCP
- Political scandals in India
- Taxation in India

=== Socio-economic issues in India ===
- Religious violence in India
- Katchatheevu Issue
- Religious tolerance in India
- Terrorism in India
- Naxalism
- Caste system in India
  - Caste politics in India
  - Caste-related violence in India
  - Reservation in India
- Human rights in India
  - LGBT rights in India
  - Freedom of religion in India

=== Branches of the government of India ===
==== Executive of the government of India ====
- Head of state: President of India
- Vice-President of India
- The Cabinet
- Head of government: Prime Minister of India
- Head of the civil services: Cabinet Secretary of India

==== Legislature of the government of India ====
- Parliament of India
  - Rajya Sabha (Council of States) – upper house of the parliament (Vice-President of India serves as the Chairman of the Rajya Sabha)
  - Lok Sabha (House of the People) – lower house of the parliament (Speaker)

==== Judiciary of the government of India ====
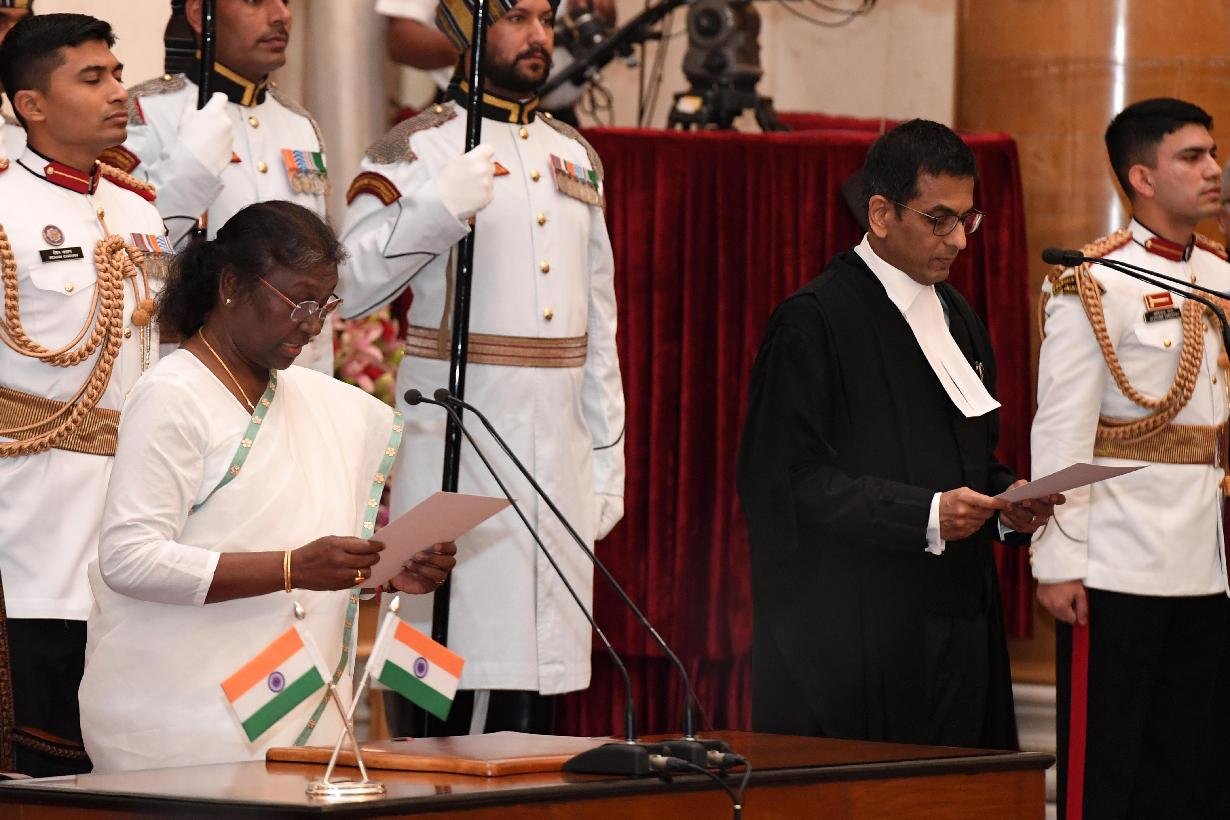
The president of India, Smt. Droupadi Murmu administered the oath of office to Justice Dhananjaya Yashwant Chandrachud as the chief justice of the Supreme Court of India

- Supreme Court of India (Chief Justice of India)
- List of high courts in India
- District Courts of India

=== Foreign relations of India ===
==== International organisation membership ====
The Republic of India is a member of:

- African Development Bank Group (AfDB) (nonregional member)
- Asian Development Bank (ADB)
- Association of Southeast Asian Nations (ASEAN) (dialogue partner)
- Association of Southeast Asian Nations Regional Forum (ARF)
- Bank for International Settlements (BIS)
- Bay of Bengal Initiative for Multi-Sectoral Technical and Economic Cooperation (BIMSTEC)
- Colombo Plan (CP)
- Commonwealth of Nations
- East Asia Summit (EAS)
- European Organization for Nuclear Research (CERN) (observer)
- Food and Agriculture Organization (FAO)
- Group of 15 (G15)
- Group of Twenty Finance Ministers and Central Bank Governors (G20)
- Group of 24 (G24)
- Group of 77 (G77)
- International Atomic Energy Agency (IAEA)
- International Bank for Reconstruction and Development (IBRD)
- International Chamber of Commerce (ICC)
- International Civil Aviation Organization (ICAO)
- International Criminal Police Organization (Interpol)
- International Development Association (IDA)
- International Federation of Red Cross and Red Crescent Societies (IFRCS)
- International Finance Corporation (IFC)
- International Fund for Agricultural Development (IFAD)
- International Hydrographic Organization (IHO)
- International Labour Organization (ILO)
- International Maritime Organization (IMO)
- International Mobile Satellite Organization (IMSO)
- International Monetary Fund (IMF)
- International Olympic Committee (IOC)
- International Organization for Migration (IOM)
- International Organization for Standardization (ISO)
- International Red Cross and Red Crescent Movement (ICRM)
- International Telecommunication Union (ITU)
- International Telecommunications Satellite Organization (ITSO)
- International Trade Union Confederation (ITUC)
- Inter-Parliamentary Union (IPU)
- League of Arab States (LAS) (observer)
- Multilateral Investment Guarantee Agency (MIGA)
- Nonaligned Movement (NAM)
- Organisation for the Prohibition of Chemical Weapons (OPCW)
- Organization of American States (OAS) (observer)
- Pacific Islands Forum (PIF) (partner)
- Permanent Court of Arbitration (PCA)
- Shanghai Cooperation Organisation (SCO) (observer)
- South Asia Co-operative Environment Programme (SACEP)
- South Asian Association for Regional Cooperation (SAARC)
- United Nations (UN)
- United Nations Conference on Trade and Development (UNCTAD)
- United Nations Disengagement Observer Force (UNDOF)
- United Nations Educational, Scientific, and Cultural Organization (UNESCO)
- United Nations High Commissioner for Refugees (UNHCR)
- United Nations Industrial Development Organization (UNIDO)
- United Nations Institute for Training and Research (UNITAR)
- United Nations Integrated Mission in Timor-Leste (UNMIT)
- United Nations Interim Force in Lebanon (UNIFIL)
- United Nations Mission in the Sudan (UNMIS)
- United Nations Operation in Cote d'Ivoire (UNOCI)
- United Nations Organization Mission in the Democratic Republic of the Congo (MONUC)
- Universal Postal Union (UPU)
- World Confederation of Labour (WCL)
- World Customs Organization (WCO)
- World Federation of Trade Unions (WFTU)
- World Health Organization (WHO)
- World Intellectual Property Organization (WIPO)
- World Meteorological Organization (WMO)
- World Tourism Organization (UNWTO)
- World Trade Organization (WTO)

=== Law and order in India ===
- Cannabis in India
- Capital punishment in India
- Company Law in India
- Indian Contract Act, 1872
- Constitution of India
  - Basic Structure
  - Directive Principles
  - Fundamental Rights
  - Fundamental Duties
- Criminal Law in India
  - Indian Penal Code
  - Code of Criminal Procedure (India)
- Indian tort law
- Property Law in India
- Crime in India
  - Bride burning
  - Organised crime in India
  - Eve teasing
  - Female foeticide in India
  - Rape in India
    - 2012 Delhi gang rape case
- Directive Principles in India
- Dowry law in India
- Fundamental Rights in India
- History of Indian law
- Law enforcement in India
- Nationality Law in India
- Labour Law in India
- List of prisons in India
- Prisons in India

==== National law enforcement agencies ====
- Ministry of Home Affairs (Minister of Home Affairs • Home Secretary)

All India Service for policing – Indian Police Service

- Border Security Force
- Central Bureau of Investigation
- Central Industrial Security Force
- Central Reserve Police Force
- Defence Security Corps
- Directorate of Revenue Intelligence
- Indo-Tibetan Border Police
- National Security Guards
- Railway Protection Force
- Special Protection Group
- Narcotics Control Bureau

==== State police forces ====
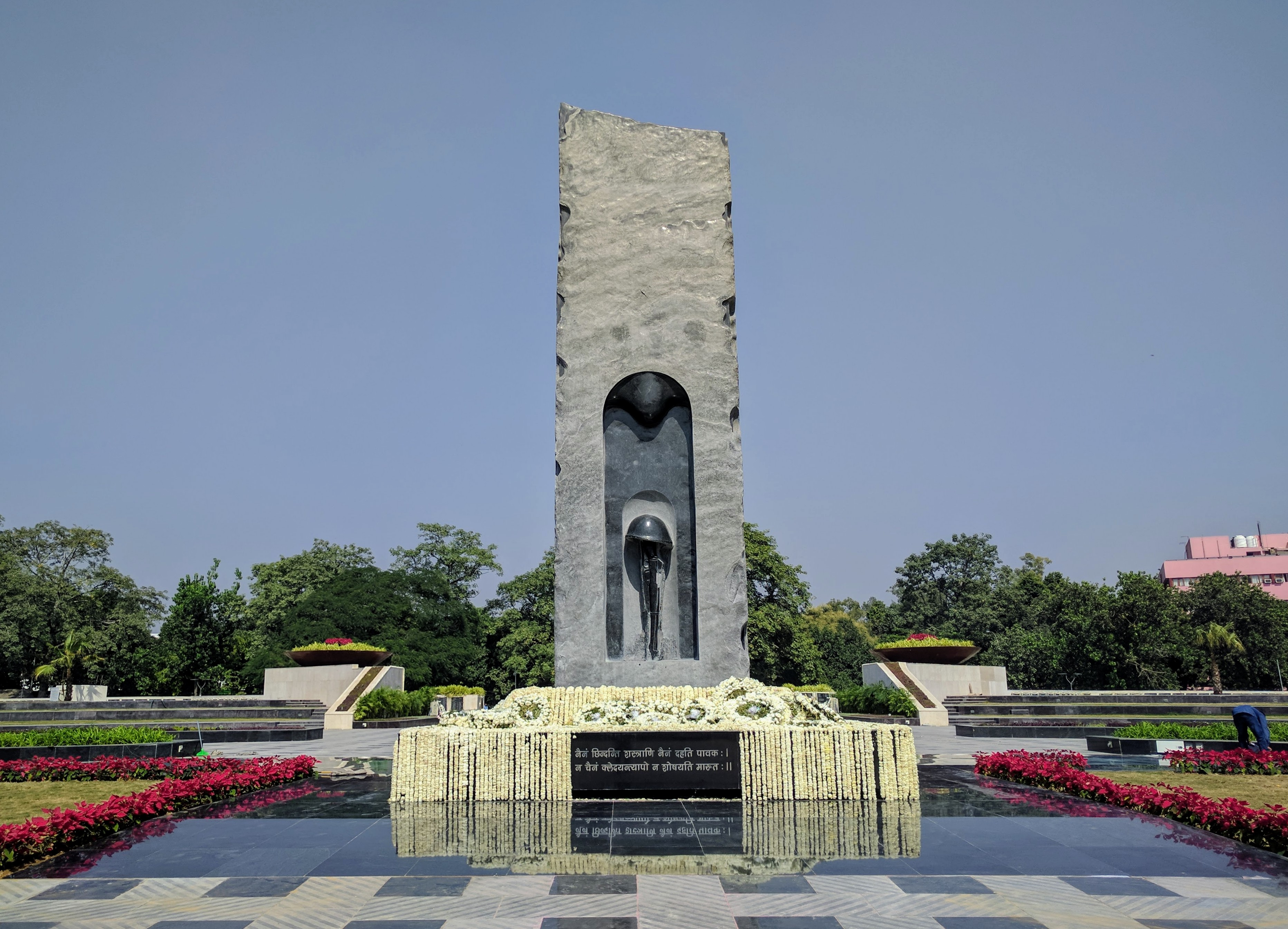
The National Police Memorial in New Delhi

1. Andhra Pradesh Police
2. Arunachal Pradesh Police
3. Assam Police
4. Bihar Police
5. Chandigarh Police
6. Chhattisgarh Police
7. Dadra and Nagar Haveli and Daman and Diu Police
8. Delhi Police
9. Goa Police
10. Gujarat Police
11. Haryana Police
12. Himachal Pradesh Police
13. Jammu and Kashmir Police
14. Jharkhand Police
15. Karnataka Police
16. Kerala Police
17. Ladakh Police
18. Lakshadweep Police
19. Madhya Pradesh Police
20. Maharashtra Police
21. Manipur Police
22. Meghalaya Police
23. Mizoram Police
24. Nagaland Police
25. Odisha Police
26. Punjab Police
27. Puducherry Police
28. Rajasthan Police
29. Sikkim Police
30. Tamil Nadu Police
31. Telangana Police
32. Tripura Police
33. Uttar Pradesh Police
34. Uttarakhand Police
35. West Bengal Police
36. Andaman and Nicobar Islands Police

=== Armed forces of India ===
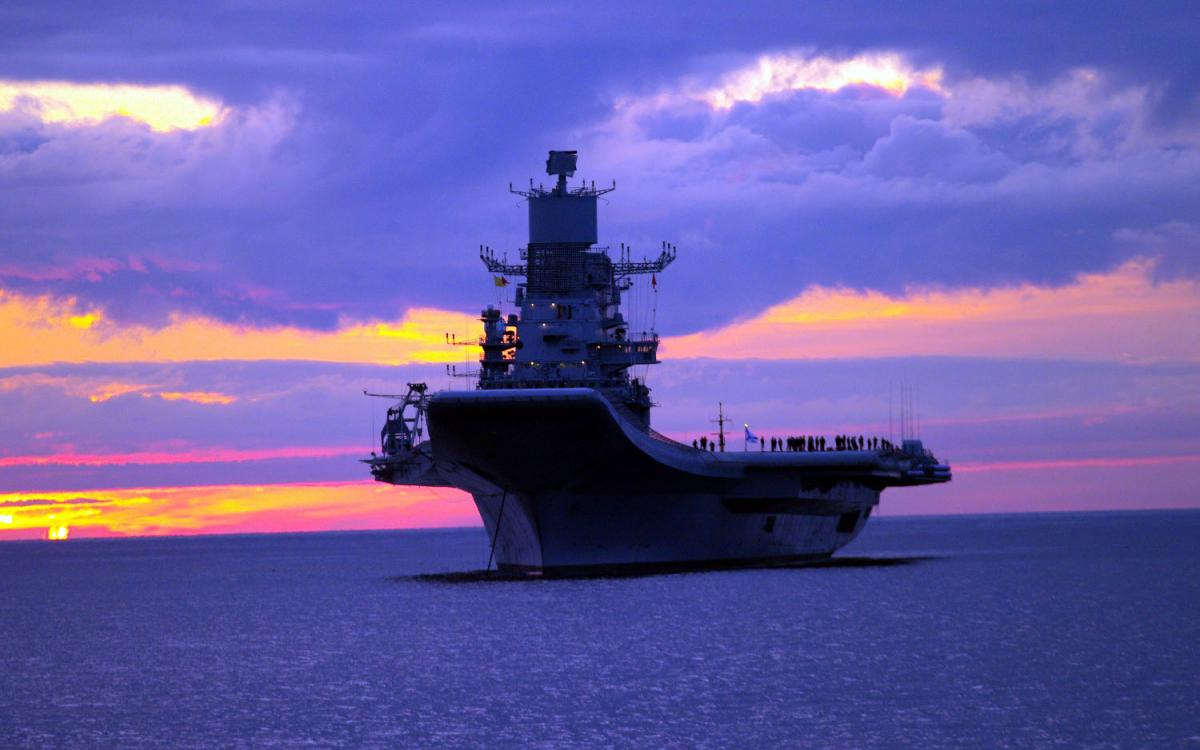
INS Vikramaditya is one of two aircraft carriers of the Indian Navy.

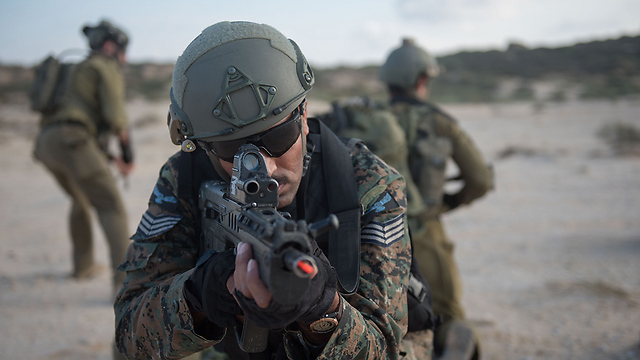
Garud commandos of the Indian Air Force

- Command
  - Commander-in-chief: President of India
    - Ministry of Defence of India
      - Minister of Defence
        - Defence Secretary
        - Strategic Nuclear Command
        - Strategic Forces Command
        - Chief of Army Staff of the Indian Army
        - Chief of Naval Staff of the Indian Navy
        - Chief of Air Staff of the Indian Air Force
- Forces
  - Army: Indian Army
    - Army ranks and insignia of India
  - Navy: Indian Navy
    - Naval ranks and insignia of India
    - Indian Ocean Naval Symposium (website)
  - Air Force: Indian Air Force
    - Air Force ranks and insignia of India
  - Indian Coast Guard
  - Special forces: Special Forces of India
  - Indian Peace Keeping Force
  - Paramilitary forces of India
  - National Security Guard
  - Special Protection Group
- Military academies in India
- India and weapons of mass destruction
  - Integrated Guided Missile Development Program

=== Government of states ===
- Governor
- Chief minister
- Chief secretary
- Vidhan Sabha
- Vidhan Parishad
- Zilla Parishad
- Panchayati Raj
1. Government of Andhra Pradesh
2. Government of Arunachal Pradesh
3. Government of Assam
4. Government of Bihar
5. Government of Chandigarh
6. Government of Chhattisgarh
7. Government of Dadra and Nagar Haveli and Daman and Diu
8. Government of Delhi
9. Government of Goa
10. Government of Gujarat
11. Government of Haryana
12. Government of Himachal Pradesh
13. Government of Jammu and Kashmir
14. Government of Jharkhand
15. Government of Karnataka
16. Government of Kerala
17. Government of Ladakh
18. Government of Lakshadweep
19. Government of Madhya Pradesh
20. Government of Maharashtra
21. Government of Manipur
22. Government of Meghalaya
23. Government of Mizoram
24. Government of Nagaland
25. Government of Odisha
26. Government of Puducherry
27. Government of Punjab
28. Government of Rajasthan
29. Government of Sikkim
30. Government of Tamil Nadu
31. Government of Telangana
32. Government of Tripura
33. Government of Uttar Pradesh
34. Government of Uttarakhand
35. Government of West Bengal
36. Government of Andaman and Nicobar

=== Politics by states and territories ===
1. Politics of Andhra Pradesh
2. Politics of Arunachal Pradesh
3. Politics of Assam
4. Politics of Bihar
5. Politics of Chandigarh
6. Politics of Chhattisgarh
7. Politics of Dadra and Nagar Haveli and Daman and Diu
8. Politics of Delhi
9. Politics of Goa
10. Politics of Gujarat
11. Politics of Haryana
12. Politics of Himachal Pradesh
13. Politics of Jammu and Kashmir
14. Politics of Jharkhand
15. Politics of Karnataka
16. Politics of Kerala
17. Politics of Ladakh
18. Politics of Lakshadweep
19. Politics of Madhya Pradesh
20. Politics of Maharashtra
21. Politics of Manipur
22. Politics of Meghalaya
23. Politics of Mizoram
24. Politics of Nagaland
25. Politics of Odisha
26. Politics of Puducherry
27. Politics of Punjab
28. Politics of Rajasthan
29. Politics of Sikkim
30. Politics of Tamil Nadu
31. Politics of Telangana
32. Politics of Tripura
33. Politics of Uttar Pradesh
34. Politics of Uttarakhand
35. Politics of West Bengal
36. Politics of Andaman and Nicobar

=== Legislative Assembly elections by states ===
1. Elections in Andhra Pradesh
2. Elections in Arunachal Pradesh
3. Elections in Assam
4. Elections in Bihar
5. Elections in Chhattisgarh
6. Elections in Delhi
7. Elections in Goa
8. Elections in Gujarat
9. Elections in Haryana
10. Elections in Himachal Pradesh
11. Elections in Jammu and Kashmir
12. Elections in Jharkhand
13. Elections in Karnataka
14. Elections in Kerala
15. Elections in Madhya Pradesh
16. Elections in Maharashtra
17. Elections in Manipur
18. Elections in Meghalaya
19. Elections in Mizoram
20. Elections in Nagaland
21. Elections in Odisha
22. Elections in Puducherry
23. Elections in Punjab
24. Elections in Rajasthan
25. Elections in Sikkim
26. Elections in Tamil Nadu
27. Elections in Telangana
28. Elections in Tripura
29. Elections in Uttar Pradesh
30. Elections in Uttarakhand
31. Elections in West Bengal

== History of India ==
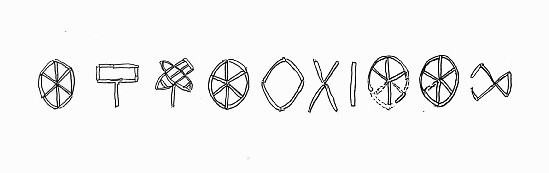
The 'Ten Indus Scripts' discovered near the northern gateway of the Dholavira citadel

=== History of India by period ===
- Prehistoric India
  - Riwatian people (1,900,000 BC)
  - Soanian people (500,000 BC)
  - South Asian Stone Age (70,000–3300 BCE)
- Ancient India (outline)
  - Ancient Indian cities
  - Indus Valley civilisation (3300–1700 BCE)
  - Late Harappan culture (1700–1300 BCE)
  - Vedic period (1700–500 BCE)
  - Iron Age (1200–300 BCE)
    - Mahajanapadas (700–300 BCE)
    - Magadha Empire
      - Haryanka dynasty (684–413 BCE)
      - Shishunaga dynasty (413–345 BCE)
      - Nanda dynasty (424–321 BCE)
    - Maurya Empire (322- 185 BCE)
  - Middle kingdoms of India (250 BCE–1279 CE)
    - Chola Empire (250 BCE–1070 CE)
    - Satavahana (230 BCE–220 CE)
    - Shunga Empire (185–75 BCE)
    - Kushan Empire (60–240 CE)
    - Gupta Empire (280–550 CE)
    - Pala Empire (750–1174 CE)
    - Rashtrakuta (753–982 CE)
- Islamic empires in India (1206–1596)
  - Delhi Sultanate (1206–1596)
  - Deccan Sultanates(1490–1596)
- Hoysala Empire (1040–1346)
- Ahom Kingdom (1228–1826)
- Vijayanagara Empire (1336–1646)
- Mughal Empire (1526–1858)
- Maratha Empire (1674–1818)
- Colonial India (1858–1947)
  - Company rule in India (1757–1858)
  - British Raj
  - Princely states
- Indian independence movement
  - Quit India Movement
  - Partition of India (1947)
- History of Republic of India (1947–present)

=== History of India by region ===
1. History of Andaman and Nicobar
2. History of Andhra Pradesh
3. History of Arunachal Pradesh
4. History of Assam
5. History of Bihar
6. History of Chandigarh
7. History of Chhattisgarh
8. History of Dadra and Nagar Haveli and Daman and Diu
9. History of Delhi
10. History of Goa
11. History of Gujarat
12. History of Haryana
13. History of Himachal Pradesh
14. History of Kashmir
15. History of Jharkhand
16. History of Karnataka
17. History of Kerala
18. History of Ladakh
19. History of Lakshadweep
20. History of Madhya Pradesh
21. History of Maharashtra
22. History of Manipur
23. History of Meghalaya
24. History of Mizoram
25. History of Nagaland
26. History of Odisha
27. History of Puducherry
28. History of Punjab
29. History of Rajasthan
30. History of Sikkim
31. History of Tamil Nadu
32. History of Telangana
33. History of Tripura
34. History of Uttar Pradesh
35. History of Uttarakhand
36. History of West Bengal

=== History of India by subject ===
- Economic history of India
- Economy of India under the British Raj
- History of Buddhism in India
- History of clothing in India
- History of education in the Indian subcontinent
- History of Hinduism
- History of Indian archaeology
- History of Indian football
  - History of the India national football team
- History of Indian influence on Southeast Asia
- History of Indian Institutes of Technology
- History of railways in India
- History of sex in India
- History of the Indian cricket team
- History of the rupee
- Indian maritime history
- Indian natural history
- LGBT history in India
- Linguistic history of India
- List of massacres in India
- Military history of India
  - History of the Indian Air Force
- Peopling of India
- Science and technology in ancient India
- Slavery in India
- Timeline of major famines in India during British rule
- History of Dravidian people

== Culture of India ==
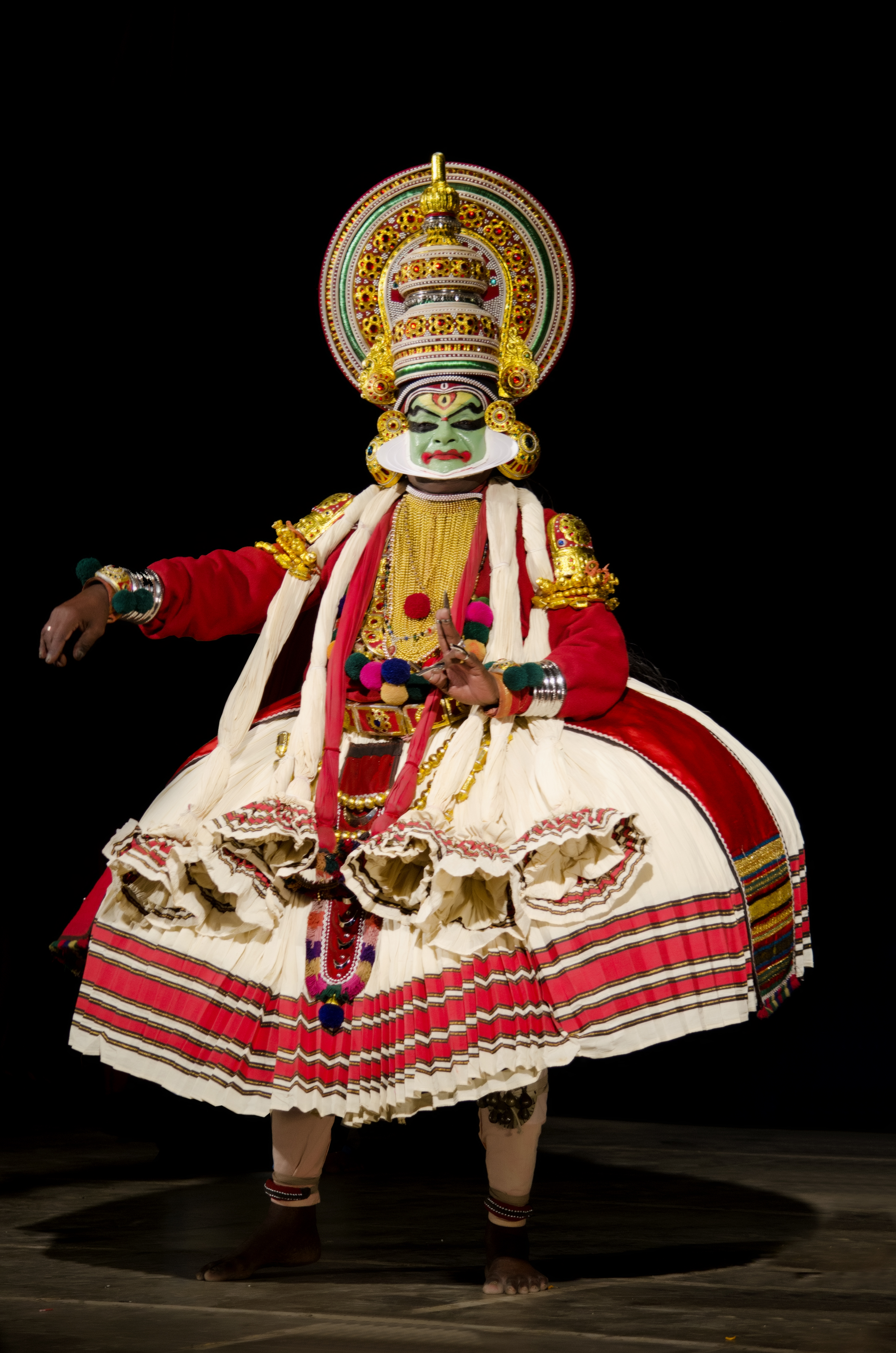
A traditional Kathakali dancer from Kerala

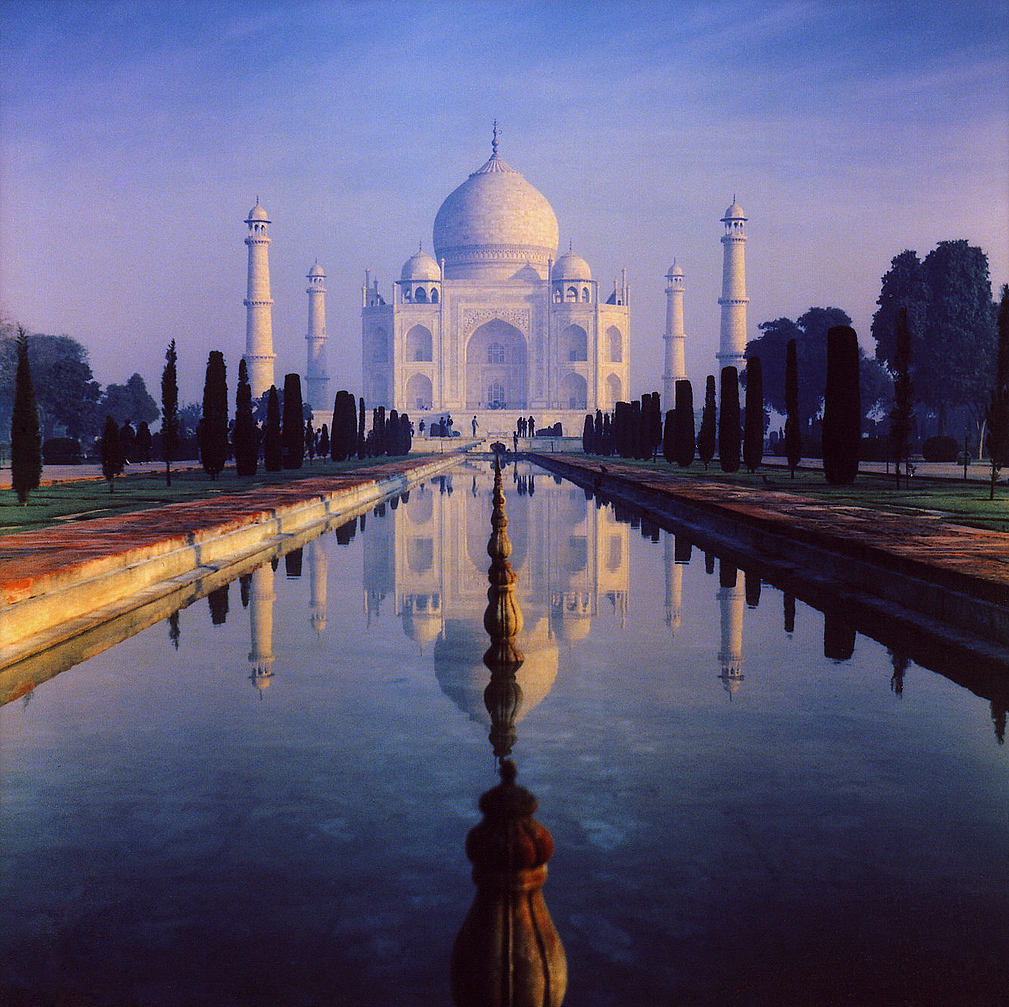
Taj Mahal

- Caste system in India
- Indian dress
- Festivals in India
- Media in India
- National symbols of India
  - Coat of arms of India
  - Flag of India
  - National anthem of India
- Public holidays in India
- Religion in India
  - Hinduism in India
  - Dravidian in India
  - Islam in India
  - Buddhism in India
  - Christianity in India
  - Judaism in India
  - Jainism in India
  - Sikhism in India
  - Zoroastrianism in India
  - Baháʼí Faith in India
- World Heritage Sites in India

=== Cuisine of India ===
- Main dishes
- Sweets and desserts
- Drinks
- Snacks
- Spices
- Condiments
- History
- Supermarket chains in India
- Fast food

==== Cuisine by regions ====
- East Indian cuisine
  - Assamese
  - Bengali
  - Bihari
  - Chhattisgarhiya
  - Odiya
  - Sikkimese
  - Assamese
  - Tripuri
  - Naga
- North Indian cuisine
  - Punjabi
  - Uttar Pradeshi
  - Rajasthani
  - Mughlai
  - Pahadi
  - Bhojpuri
  - Benarasi
  - Kashmiri
  - Sindhi
  - Awadhi
  - Haryanvi
- South Indian cuisine
  - Malabar
  - Kerala
  - Tamil
  - Andhra
  - Karnataka
  - Telangana
  - Hyderabadi
  - Mangalorean
  - Chettinad
  - Udupi
  - Coorg
  - Rayalseema cuisine
- West Indian cuisine
  - Goan
  - Gujarati
  - Maharashtrian/Marathi
  - Malvani/Konkani
  - Parsi

=== The arts in India ===
- Art in India
- Comics in India
  - Webcomics in India
- Television in India
- Theatre in India
- Indian classical dance
  - Dance forms of Andhra Pradesh

==== Architecture of India ====
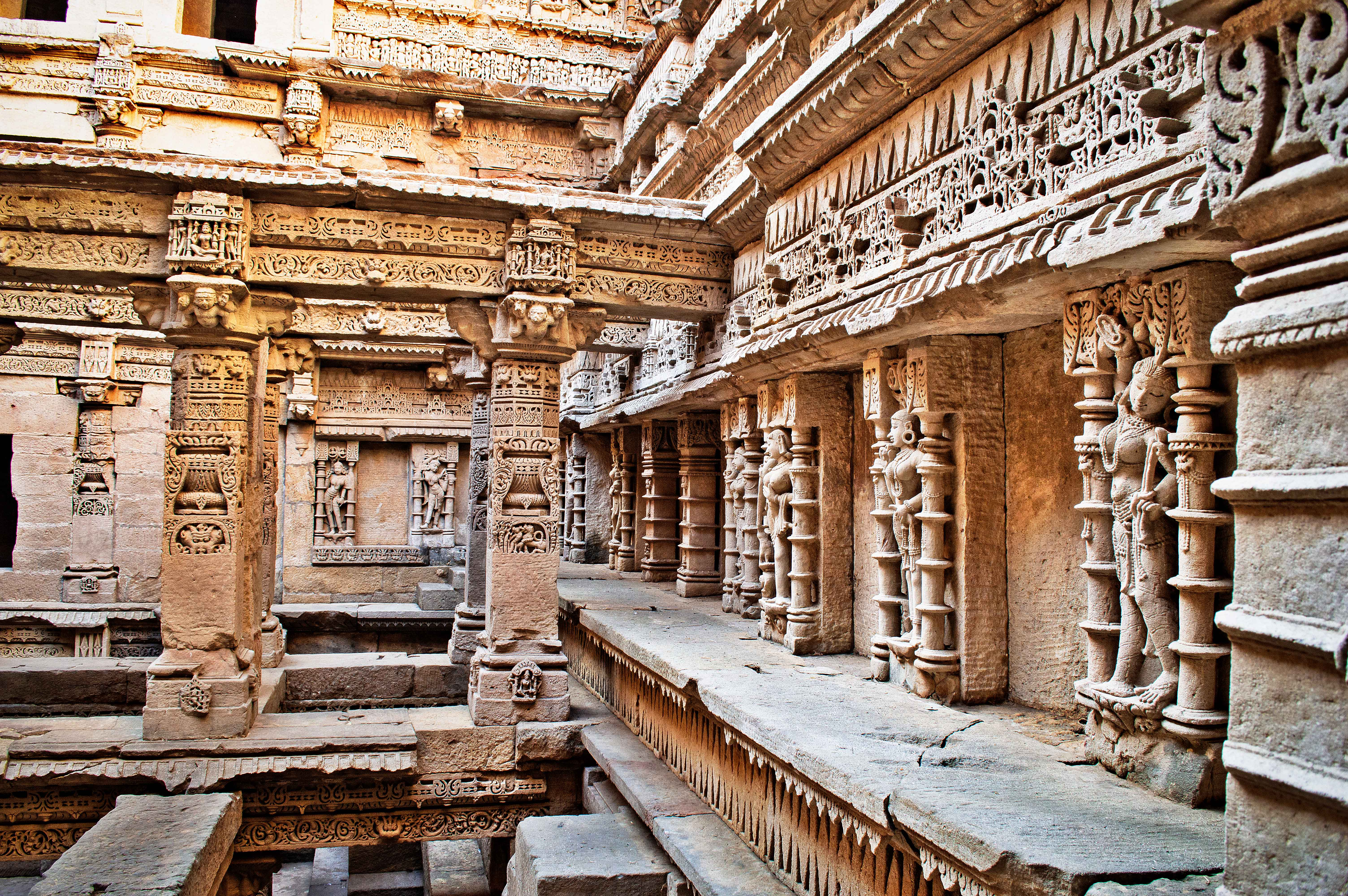
The intricately carved walls and galleries of Rani Ki Vav in Gujarat

- Hindu temple architecture
- Buddhist architecture
- Indian rock-cut architecture
- Indian vernacular architecture
- Dravidian Architecture
- Hemadpanthi
- Western Chalukya Architecture
- Badami Chalukya Architecture
- Rajasthani architecture
- Architecture of Karnataka
- Architecture of Bengal
- Hoysala architecture
- Vijayanagara architecture
- Kalinga Architecture
- Maratha Architecture
- Mughal architecture
- Indo-Islamic architecture
- Indo-Saracenic Revival architecture
- Chandigarh
- List of Indian architects

==== Cinema of India ====
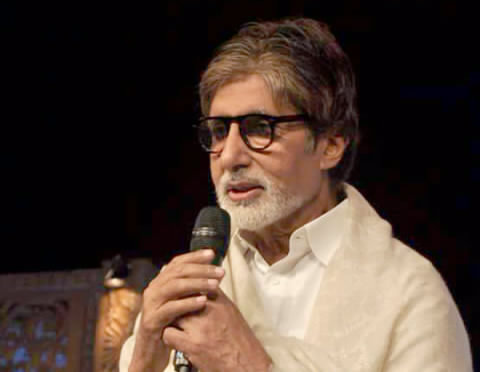
Amitabh Bachchan is one of the most dominant actors in the Indian movie industry.

- Lists of Indian films
- List of Indian documentary films
- List of highest-grossing Bollywood films
- List of Bhojpuri films
- List of Marathi films
- List of Assamese films
- List of Tamil-language films
- List of Telugu-language films
- List of Malayalam films
- List of Kannada films
- List of Indian Bengali films
- List of Indian film actresses
- List of Indian film actors
- List of Indian film directors
- List of Indian film choreographers
- List of Indian film cinematographers
- List of Indian film score composers
- List of film festivals in India
- List of Indian film producers
- List of Indian film screenwriters

===== Film Awards =====
- National Film Awards
- Filmfare Awards
- Stardust Awards
- Star Screen Awards
- Bollywood Movie Awards
- Global Indian Film Awards
- IIFA Awards
- Zee Cine Awards
- Nandi Awards
- Karnataka State Film Awards

===== Cinema by region =====
- Assamese cinema
- Bengali cinema
- Bhojpuri cinema
- Chhattisgarhi cinema
- Hindi cinema
- Kannada cinema
- Konkani cinema
- Malayalam cinema
- Marathi cinema
- Odia Cinema
- Tamil cinema
- Telugu cinema
- Kashmiri cinema
- Punjabi cinema
- Haryanvi cinema

==== Music of India ====
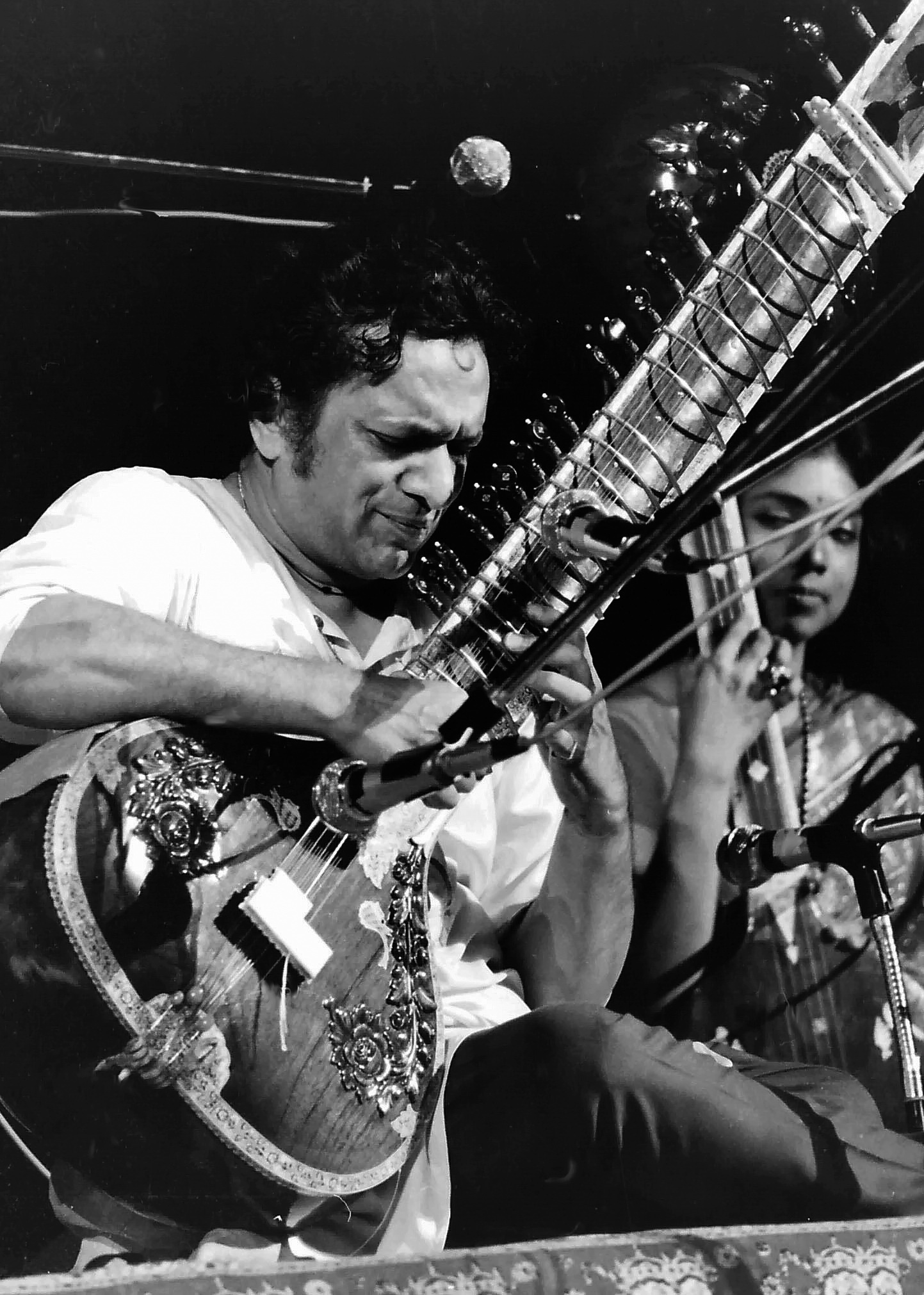
Ravi Shankar is known for combining elements of traditional Indian music with Western music.

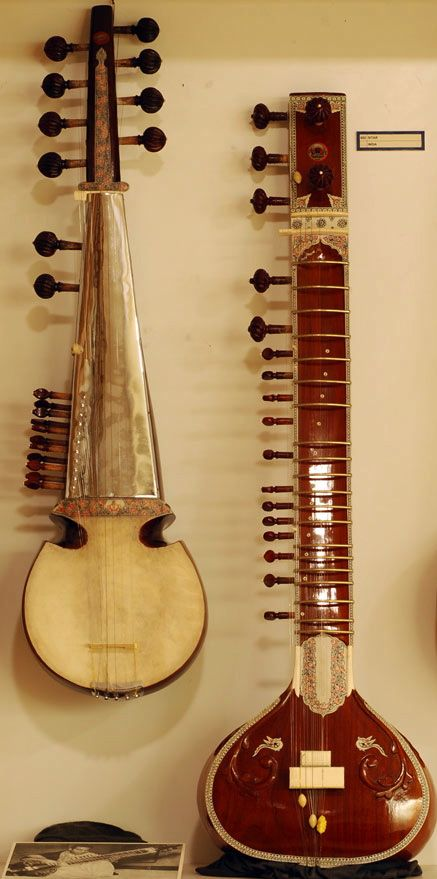
Sarod and sitar

- Indian classical music
  - Hindustani classical music
  - Carnatic classical music
- Indian folk music
  - Bhavageete
  - Bhangra (music)
  - Pandavani
  - Lavani
  - Dandiya
  - Baul music
- Qawwali
- Indian pop
- Indian hip hop
- Filmi
- Indian rock
- Sangeet Natak Akademi
- Thyagaraja Aradhana
- Cleveland Thyagaraja Aradhana
- Chembai sangeetha utsavam
- List of Indian playback singers
- Indian musical instruments

===== Music by states and territories =====
1. Music of Andaman and Nicobar
2. Music of Andhra Pradesh
3. Music of Arunachal Pradesh
4. Music of Assam
5. Music of Bihar
6. Music of Chandigarh
7. Music of Chhattisgarh
8. Music of Dadra and Nagar Haveli and Daman and Diu
9. Music of Delhi
10. Music of Goa
11. Music of Gujarat
12. Music of Haryana
13. Music of Himachal Pradesh
14. Music of Jammu and Kashmir
15. Music of Jharkhand
16. Music of Karnataka
17. Music of Kerala
18. Music of Ladakh
19. Music of Lakshadweep
20. Music of Madhya Pradesh
21. Music of Maharashtra
22. Music of Manipur
23. Music of Meghalaya
24. Music of Mizoram
25. Music of Nagaland
26. Music of Odisha
27. Music of Puducherry
28. Music of Punjab
29. Music of Rajasthan
30. Music of Sikkim
31. Music of Tamil Nadu
32. Music of Tripura
33. Music of Uttar Pradesh
34. Music of Uttarakhand
35. Music of West Bengal

==== Literature of India ====
- List of Indian poets
- List of Indian authors
- Indian epic poetry
- Jnanpith award
- Sahitya Akademi Award
- Indian Literature (journal)
- Indian folklore

===== Literature by language =====
- Assamese literature
- Bengali literature
- Bhojpuri literature
- Chhattisgarhi literature
- Gujarati literature
- Hindi literature
- Kannada literature
- Literature of Kashmir
- Konkani literature
- Malayalam literature
- Marathi literature
- Nepali literature
- Odia literature
- Pali litearature
- Prakrit literature
- Punjabi literature
- Rajasthani literature
- Sanskrit literature
- Sindhi literature
- Tamil literature
- Telugu literature
- Urdu literature
- Vedic literature
- Indian English literature

=== Languages in India ===
Official languages of India by state and union territory

- Angika language
- Assamese language
- Bajjika language
- Bengali language
- Bodo language
- Bhojpuri language
- Chhattisgarhi language
- Dogri language
- English language
- Garo language
- Gujarati language
- Hindustani language
  - Hindi
  - Urdu
- Haryanvi language
- Kannada language
- Kashmiri language
- Khasi language
- Kokborok language
- Konkani language
- Magahi language
- Maithali language
- Malayalam language
- Meitei language
- Marathi language
- Mizo language
- Nepali language
- Odia language
- Prakrit language
- Punjabi language
- Rajasthani language
- Sanskrit language
- Santali language
- Sindhi language
- Saurashtra language
- Tamil language
- Telugu language
- Tulu language
- Kodava language
- Western Pahari

=== Sports in India ===
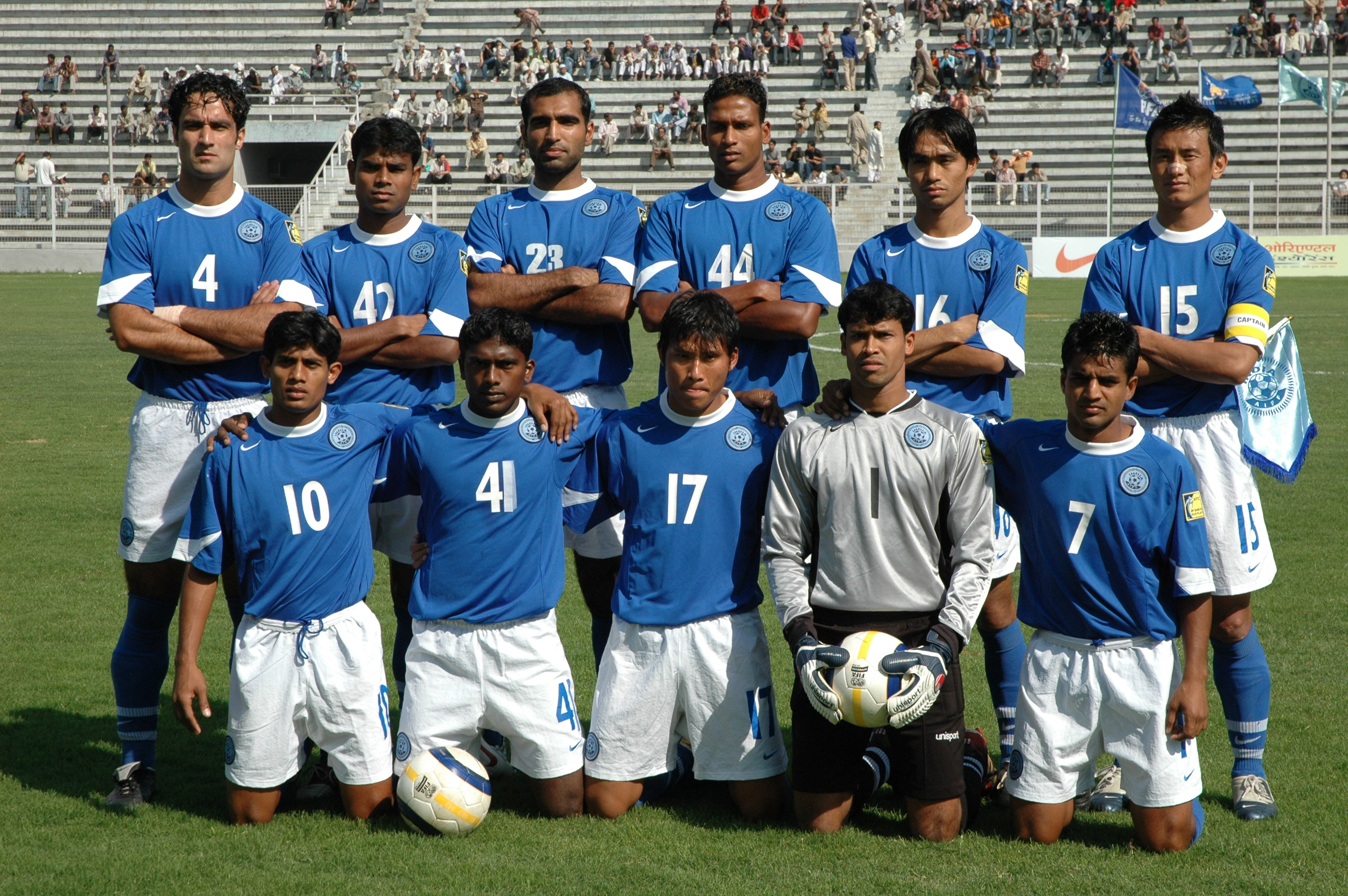
Indian football team

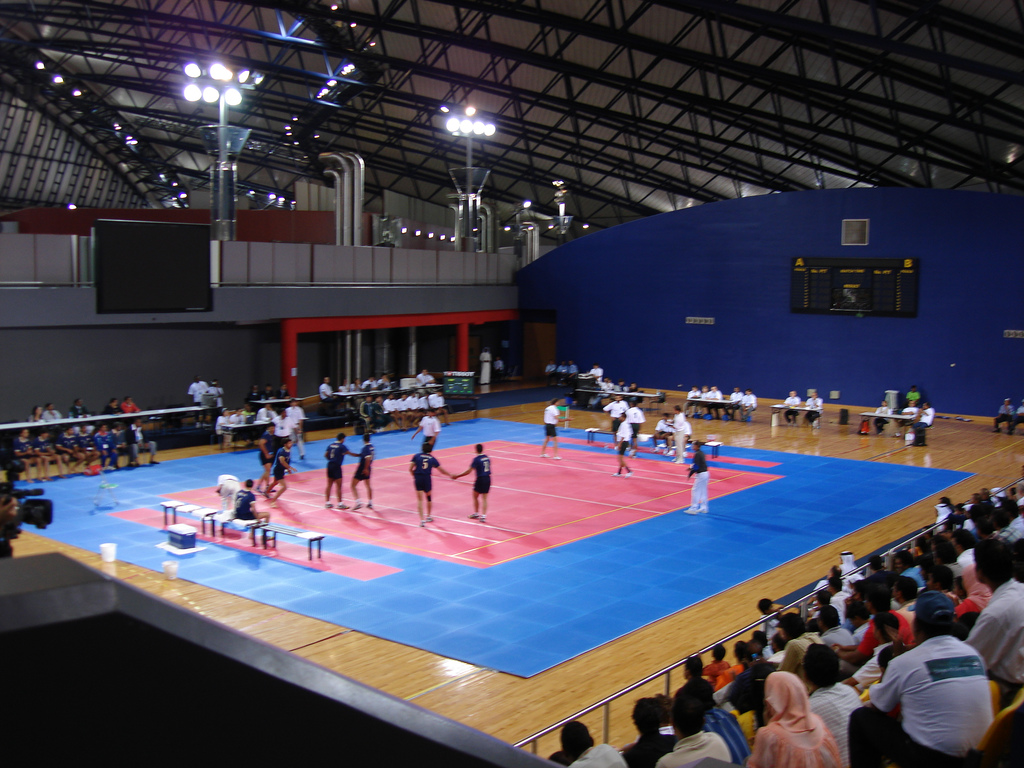
A Kabaddi match at 2006 Asian Games

==== Multi-sport events ====
- India at the Olympics
- India at the Commonwealth Games
- India at the Asian Games
- India at the Lusofonia Games

==== General topics ====
- Traditional sports of India
- Indian physical culture
- Sports in Delhi

==== Specific sports ====
- Cricket in India
- Field hockey in India
- Football in India
- Kabaddi
- Indian martial art
- Pickleball in India
- Rugby union in India
- Wrestling in India

==== Major Sports Leagues ====
- Hockey India League (Hockey)
- Indian Premier League (Cricket)
- I-League (Football)
- Indian Super League (Football)
- Indian Badminton League (IBL) (Badminton)
- Pro Kabaddi (Kabaddi)
- Ultimate Table Tennis (Table Tennis)
- Ultimate Kho Kho (Kho-Kho)

=== Culture by region ===
1. Culture of Andaman and Nicobar
2. Culture of Andhra Pradesh
3. Culture of Arunachal Pradesh
4. Culture of Assam
5. Culture of Bihar
6. Culture of Chandigarh
7. Culture of Chhattisgarh
8. Culture of Dadra and Nagar Haveli and Daman and Diu
9. Culture of Delhi
10. Culture of Goa
11. Culture of Gujarat
12. Culture of Haryana
13. Culture of Himachal Pradesh
14. Culture of Jammu and Kashmir
15. Culture of Jharkhand
16. Culture of Karnataka
17. Culture of Kerala
18. Culture of Ladakh
19. Culture of Lakshadweep
20. Culture of Madhya Pradesh
21. Culture of Maharashtra
22. Culture of Manipur
23. Culture of Meghalaya
24. Culture of Mizoram
25. Culture of Nagaland
26. Culture of Odisha
27. Culture of Puducherry
28. Culture of Punjab
29. Culture of Rajasthan
30. Culture of Sikkim
31. Culture of Tamil Nadu
32. Culture of Telangana
33. Culture of Tripura
34. Culture of Uttar Pradesh
35. Culture of Uttarakhand
36. Culture of West Bengal

==== By directional region ====
1. North Indian culture
2. South Indian culture

== Economy and infrastructure of India ==
- Economic rank, by nominal GDP (2026): 6th (sixth)

- Agriculture in India
  - Animal husbandry in India
  - Fishing industry in India
  - Forestry in India
- Banking in India
  - Banks in India
  - Reserve Bank of India
- Bombay Stock Exchange
- Communications in India
  - Amateur radio in India
  - Internet in India
    - Asia-Pacific Network Information Centre
- Companies of India
- Currency of India: Rupee
  - ISO 4217: INR
- Economic development in India
- Economic history of India
- Economic Survey of India
- Energy in India
- Finances of India
  - Finance minister of India
  - Finance Commission of India
  - Five-Year Plans of India
  - Union budget of India
  - Taxation in India
    - Central Excise (India)
- Health care in India
  - Abortion in India
- Mining in India
- Poverty in India
- National Stock Exchange of India
- Tourism in India
- Transport in India
  - Airports in India
  - Automobile industry in India
  - Inland waterways of India
  - Ports in India
  - Rail transport in India
  - Roads in India
- Water supply and sanitation in India

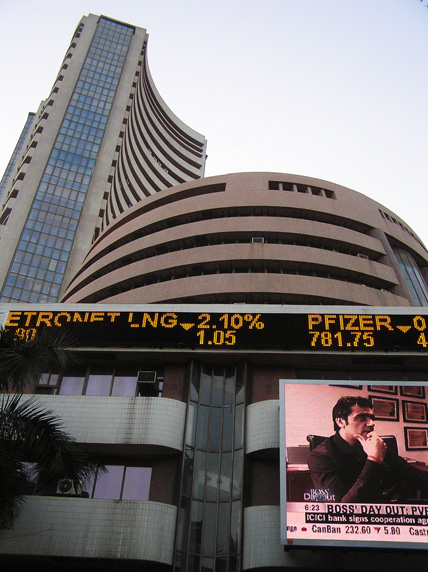
Bombay Stock Exchange

=== Economy & infrastructure of states ===
1. Economy of Andaman and Nicobar
2. Economy of Andhra Pradesh
3. Economy of Arunachal Pradesh
4. Economy of Assam
5. Economy of Bihar
6. Economy of Chandigarh
7. Economy of Chhattisgarh
8. Economy of Dadra and Nagar Haveli and Daman and Diu
9. Economy of Delhi
10. Economy of Goa
11. Economy of Gujarat
12. Economy of Haryana
13. Economy of Himachal Pradesh
14. Economy of Jammu and Kashmir
15. Economy of Jharkhand
16. Economy of Karnataka
17. Economy of Kerala
18. Economy of Ladakh
19. Economy of Lakshadweep
20. Economy of Madhya Pradesh
21. Economy of Maharashtra
22. Economy of Manipur
23. Economy of Meghalaya
24. Economy of Mizoram
25. Economy of Nagaland
26. Economy of Odisha
27. Economy of Puducherry
28. Economy of Punjab
29. Economy of Rajasthan
30. Economy of Sikkim
31. Economy of Tamil Nadu
32. Economy of Telangana
33. Economy of Tripura
34. Economy of Uttar Pradesh
35. Economy of Uttarakhand
36. Economy of West Bengal

== Education in India ==
Top Indian Universities (NIRF Rankings 2024)

| Ranking | Name of University | City | State |
|---|---|---|---|
| 1 | Indian Institute of Science | Bengaluru | Karnataka |
| 2 | Jawaharlal Nehru University | New Delhi | Delhi |
| 3 | Jamia Millia Islamia | New Delhi | Delhi |
| 4 | Manipal Academy of Higher Education | Manipal | Karnataka |
| 5 | Banaras Hindu University | Varanasi | Uttar Pradesh |
| 6 | University of Delhi | Delhi | Delhi |
| 7 | Amrita Vishwa Vidyapeetham | Coimbatore | Tamil Nadu |
| 8 | Aligarh Muslim University | Aligarh | Uttar Pradesh |
| 9 | Jadavpur University | Kolkata | West Bengal |
| 10 | Vellore Institute of Technology | Vellore | Tamil Nadu |

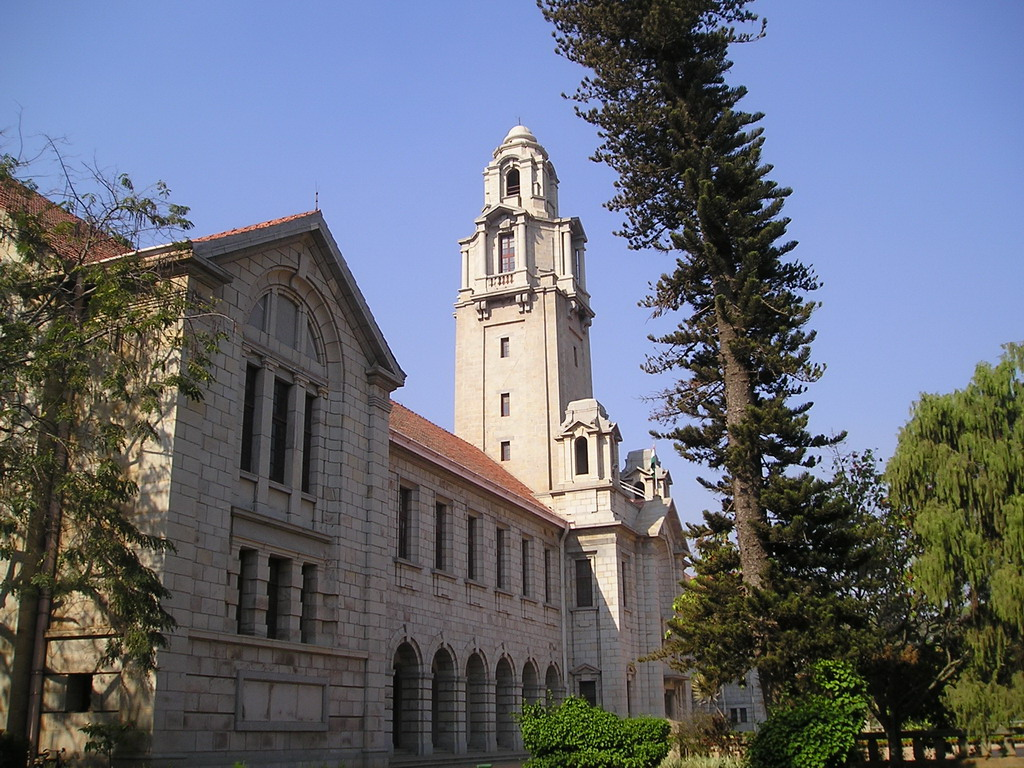
IISC, Bengaluru

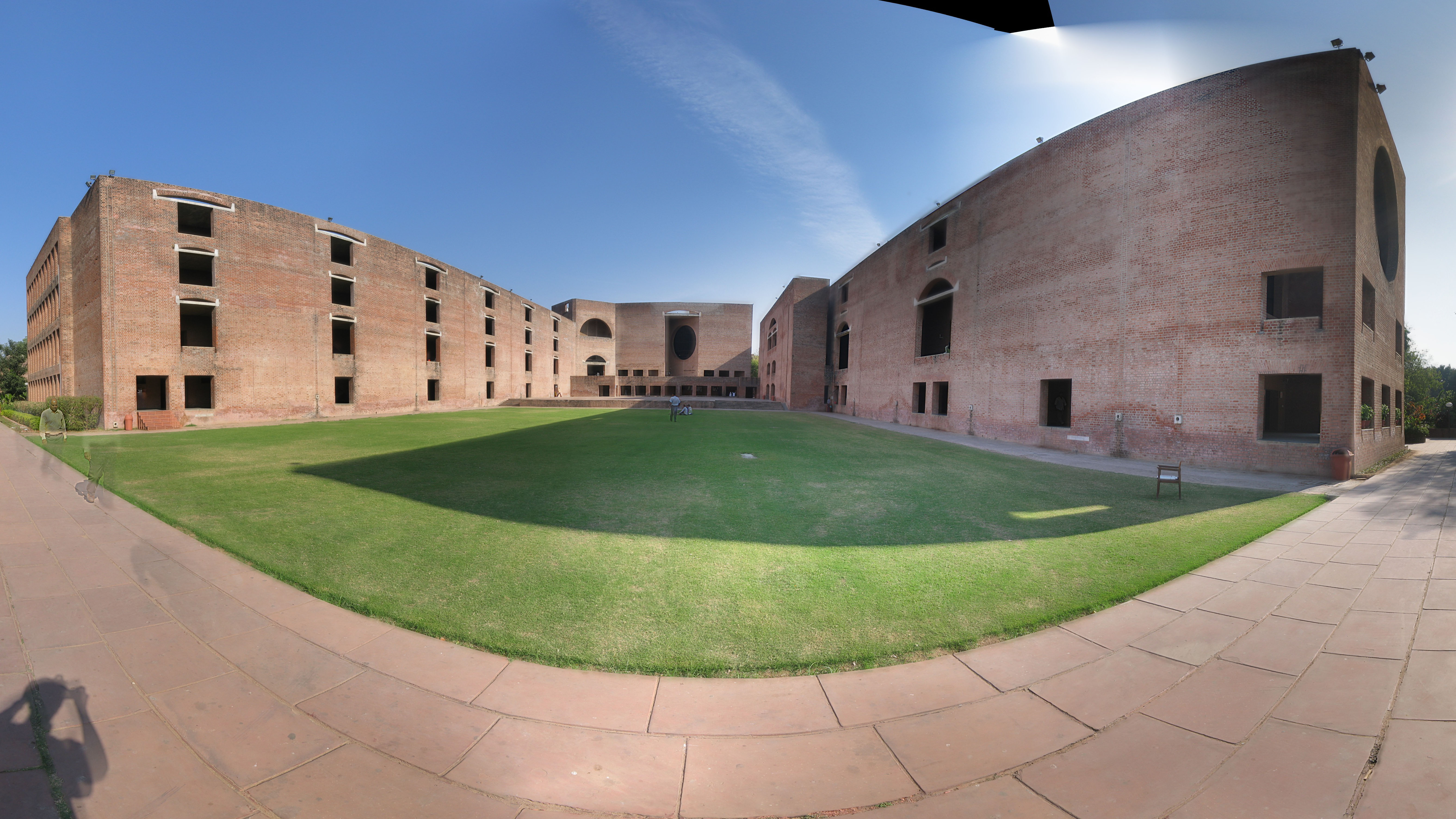
Indian Institute of Management Ahmedabad complex panorama

- Literacy
- Schools
- Department of Higher Education
- CBSE
- CISCE
- NIOS
- Sarva Shiksha Abhiyan
- University Grants Commission
- AICTE
- Distance Education Council
- NAAC
- Medical Council of India
- Dental Council of India
- Institutes of Technology
- Institutes of Management
- Institutes of Science
- Bar Council of India
- Legal education in India
- Autonomous law schools in India

=== Education in states ===
1. Education in Andaman and Nicobar
2. Education in Andhra Pradesh
3. Education in Arunachal Pradesh
4. Education in Assam
5. Education in Bihar
6. Education in Chandigarh
7. Education in Chhattisgarh
8. Education in Dadra and Nagar Haveli and Daman and Diu
9. Education in Delhi
10. Education in Goa
11. Education in Gujarat
12. Education in Haryana
13. Education in Himachal Pradesh
14. Education in Jammu and Kashmir
15. Education in Jharkhand
16. Education in Karnataka
17. Education in Kerala
18. Education of Ladakh
19. Education in Lakshadweep
20. Education in Madhya Pradesh
21. Education in Maharashtra
22. Education in Manipur
23. Education in Meghalaya
24. Education in Mizoram
25. Education in Nagaland
26. Education in Odisha
27. Education in Puducherry
28. Education in Punjab
29. Education in Rajasthan
30. Education in Sikkim
31. Education in Tamil Nadu
32. Education in Telangana
33. Education in Tripura
34. Education in Uttar Pradesh
35. Education in Uttarakhand
36. Education in West Bengal

== Tourism in India ==
=== Tourist attractions ===
- List of World Heritage Sites in India
- List of National Geo-heritage Monuments in India
- List of national parks of India
- List of lakes of India
- List of waterfalls in India
- List of State Protected Monuments in India
- List of beaches in India
- Incredible India
- List of Geographical Indications in India
- Medical tourism in India
- List of botanical gardens in India
- List of hill stations in India
- List of gates in India
- List of zoos in India
- List of hindu temples in India
- List of protected areas of India
- List of aquaria in India
- List of forts in India
- List of forests in India
- Buddhist pilgrimage sites in India
- Jain pilgrimage sites in India
- Hindu pilgrimage sites in India
- List of mosques in India
- List of rock-cut temples in India
- Wildlife sanctuaries of India
- List of rivers of India
- List of mountains in India
- List of ecoregions in India
- Coral reefs in India
- List of stadiums in India

=== Tourism in states ===
List of tourism in different states of India

1. Tourism in Andaman and Nicobar
2. Tourism in Andhra Pradesh
3. Tourism in Arunachal Pradesh
4. Tourism in Assam
5. Tourism in Bihar
6. Tourism in Chandigarh
7. Tourism in Chhattisgarh
8. Tourism in Dadra and Nagar Haveli and Daman and Diu
9. Tourism in Delhi
10. Tourism in Goa
11. Tourism in Gujarat
12. Tourism in Haryana
13. Tourism in Himachal Pradesh
14. Tourism in Jammu and Kashmir
15. Tourism in Jharkhand
16. Tourism in Karnataka
17. Tourism in Kerala
18. Tourism in Ladakh
19. Tourism in Lakshadweep
20. Tourism in Madhya Pradesh
21. Tourism in Maharashtra
22. Tourism in Manipur
23. Tourism in Meghalaya
24. Tourism in Mizoram
25. Tourism in Nagaland
26. Tourism in Odisha
27. Tourism in Puducherry
28. Tourism in Punjab
29. Tourism in Rajasthan
30. Tourism in Sikkim
31. Tourism in Tamil Nadu
32. Tourism in Telangana
33. Tourism in Tripura
34. Tourism in Uttar Pradesh
35. Tourism in Uttarakhand
36. Tourism in West Bengal
37. Tourism in North East India
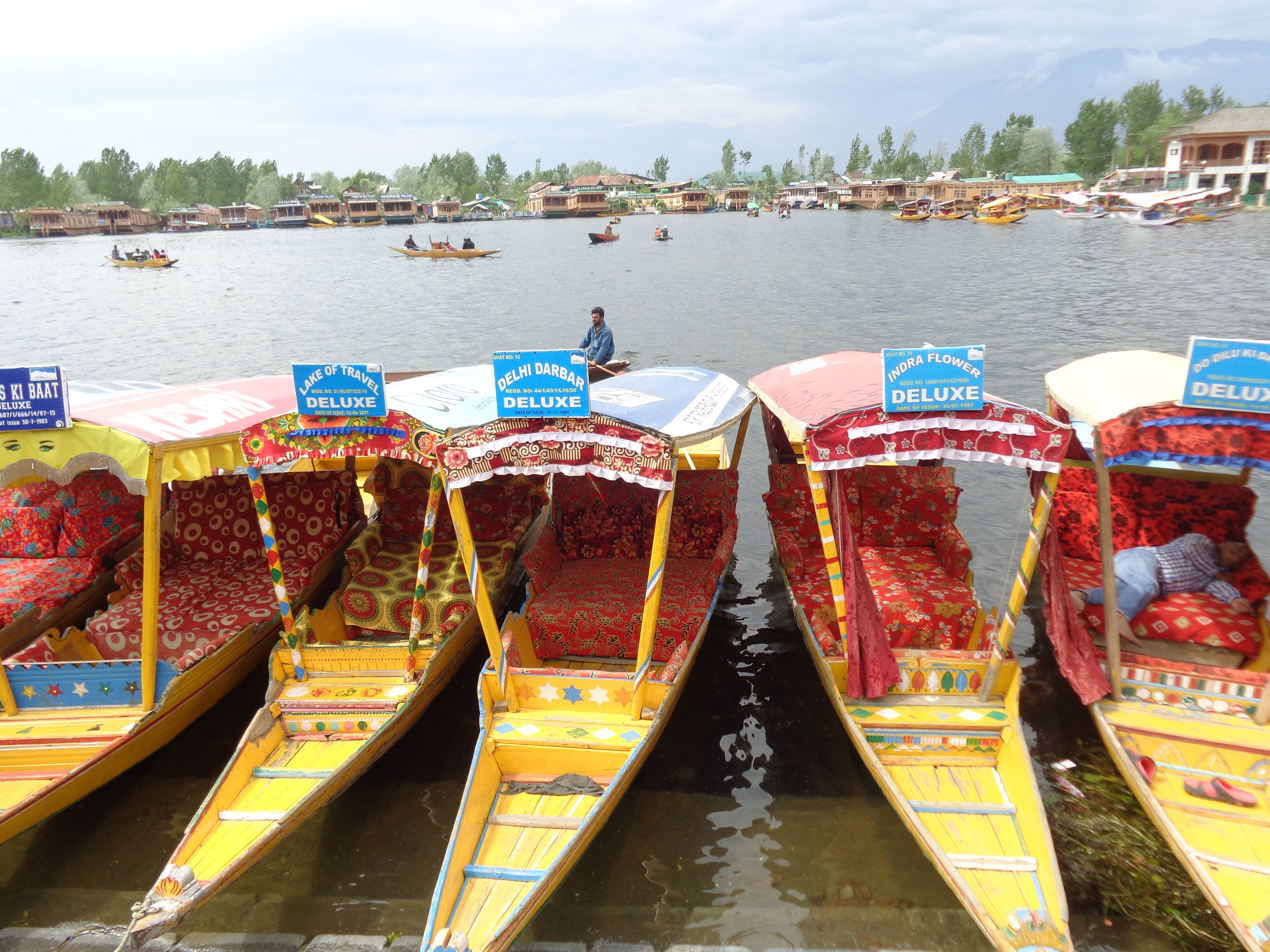
Shikkaras at Dal lake, Jammu and Kashmir, India

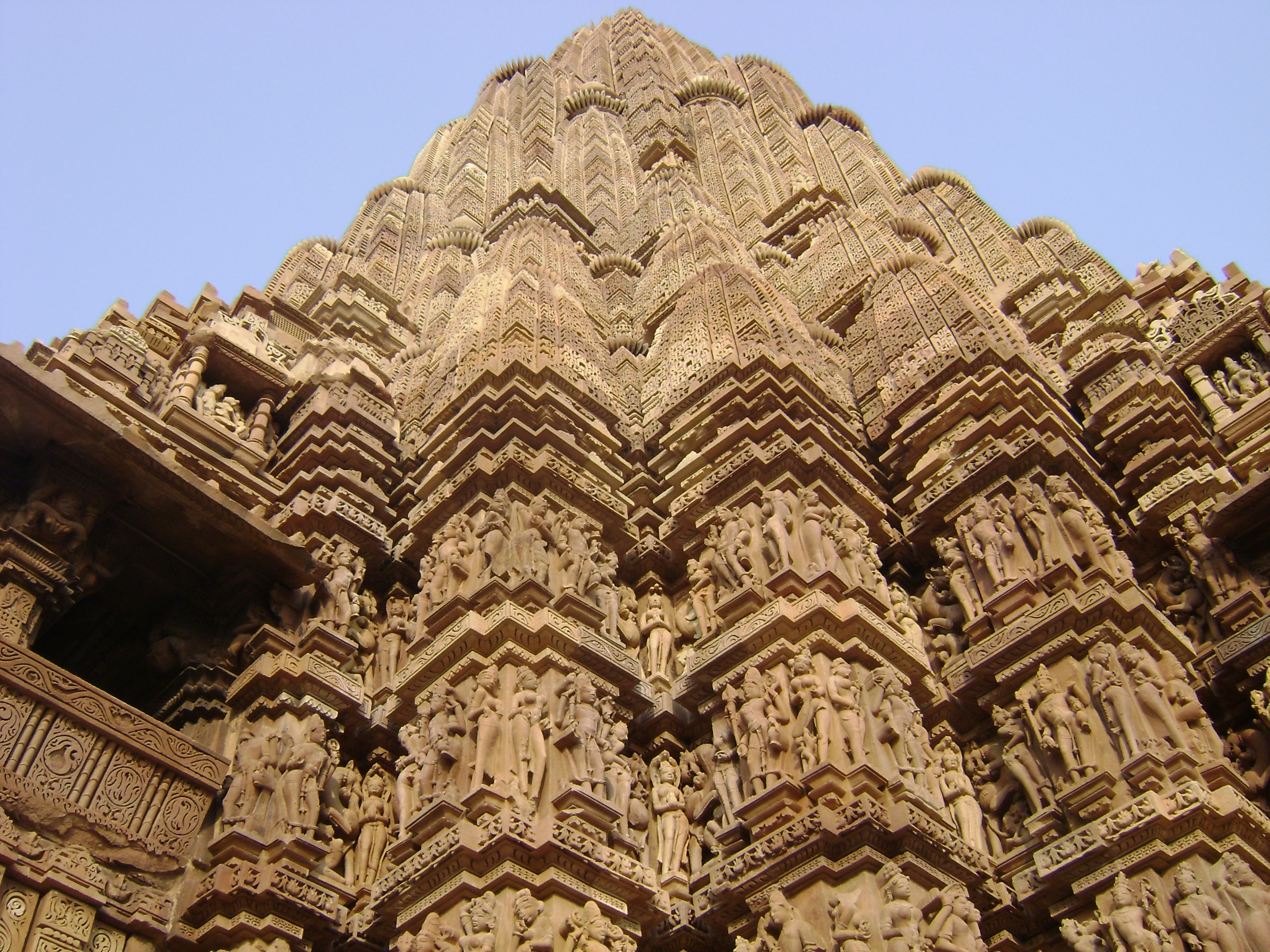
Khajuraho Temple, Madhya Pradesh, India

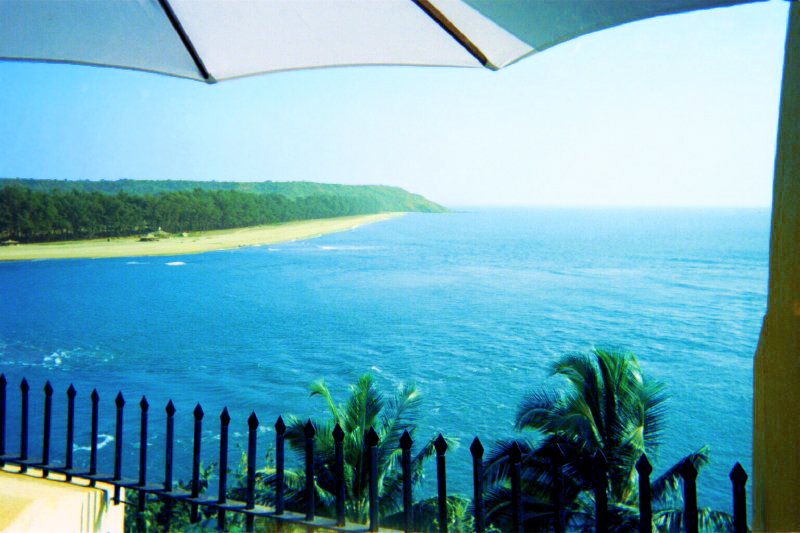
Beach of Goa, India

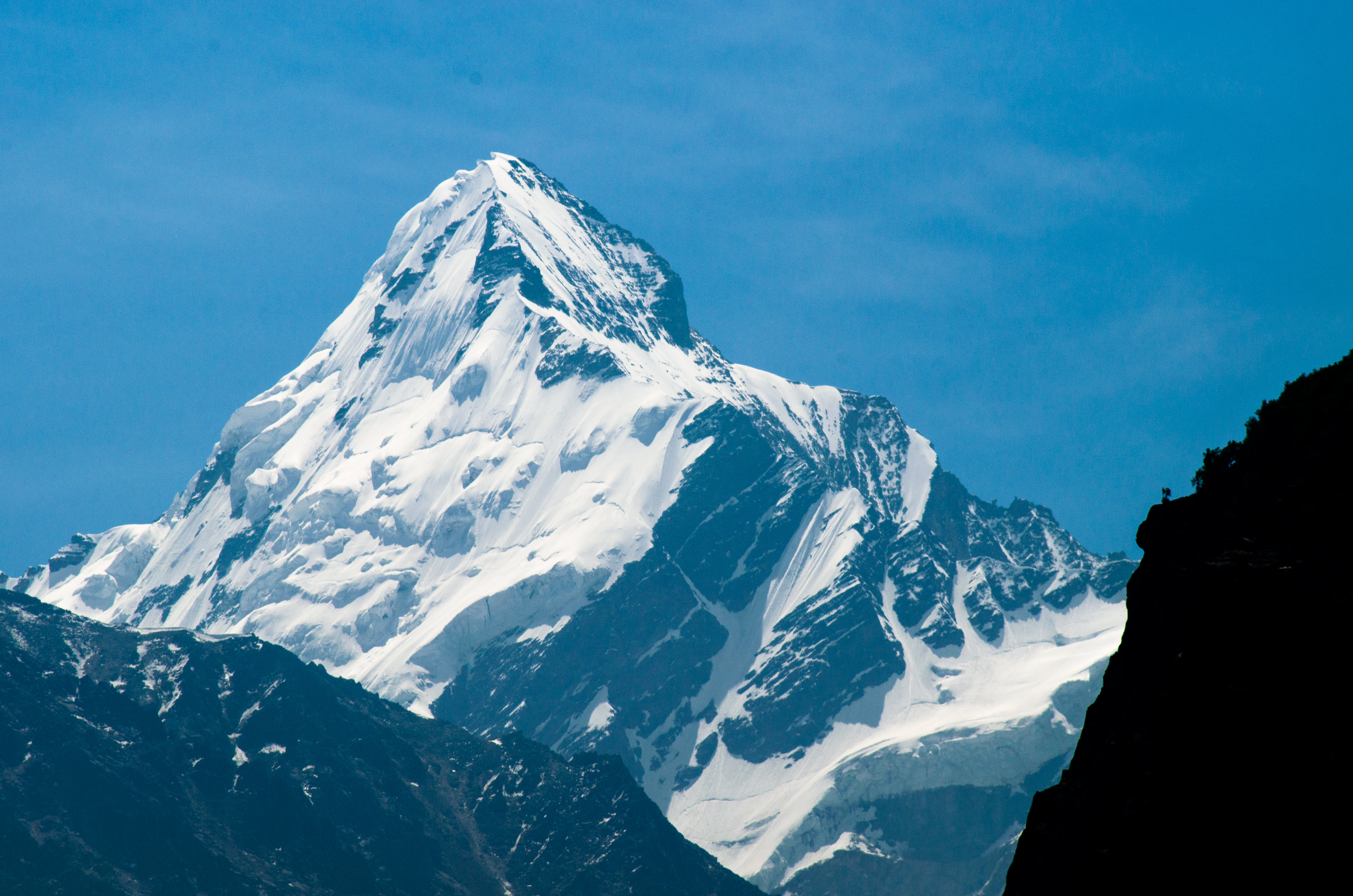
Gangotri Glacier, Uttarakhand, India

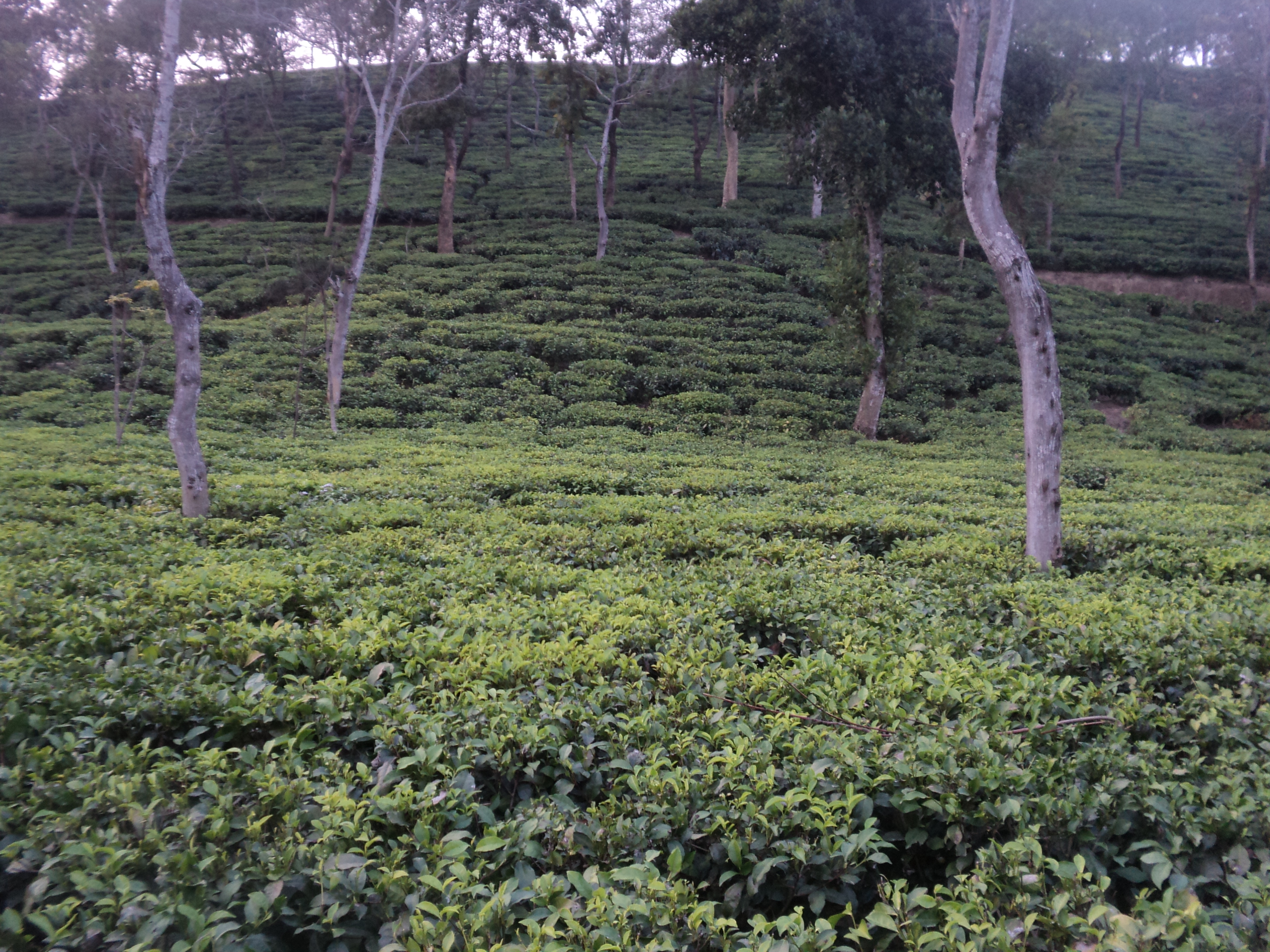
A Tea Garden of Cachar, Assam, India

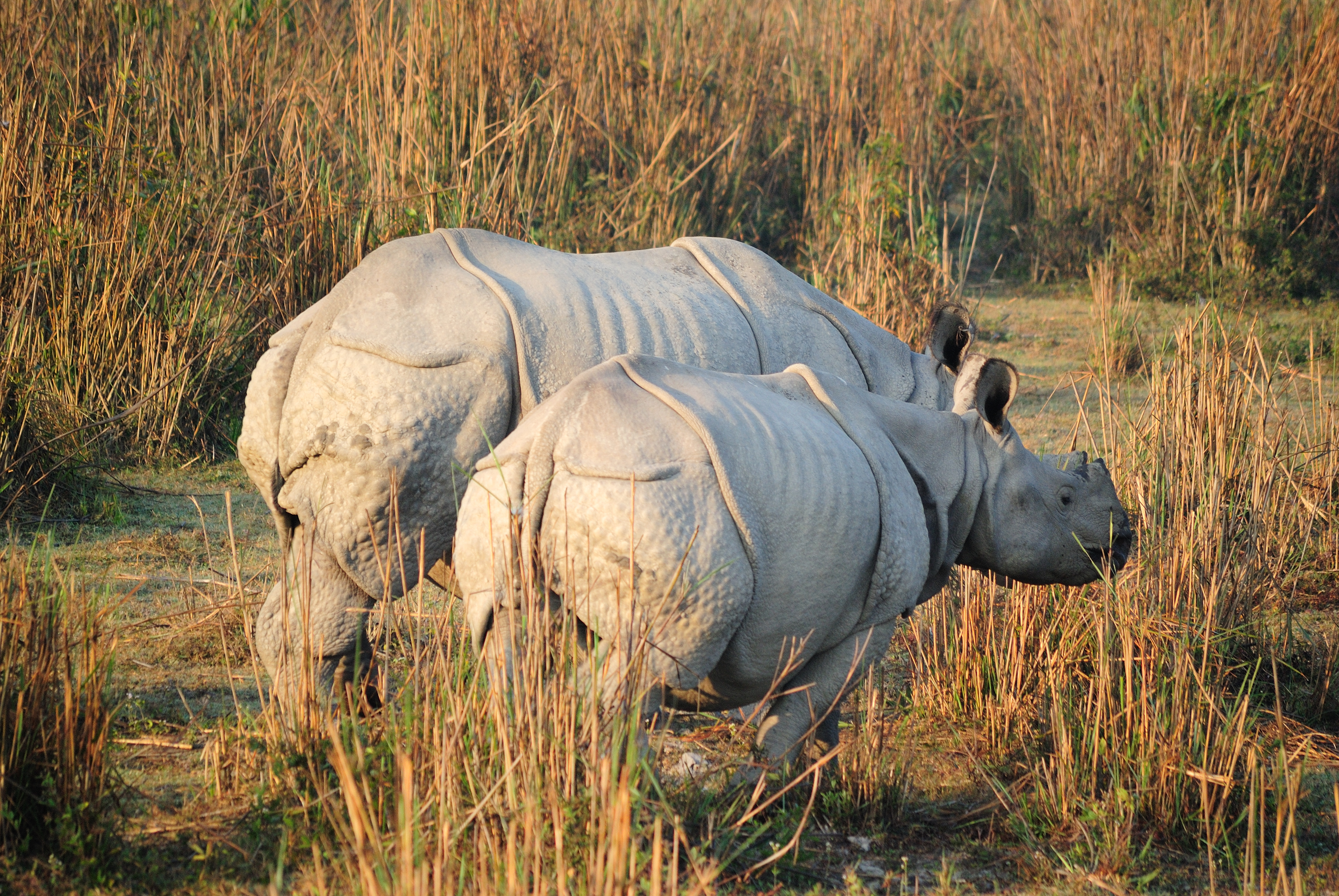
Kaziranga National Park, Assam, India

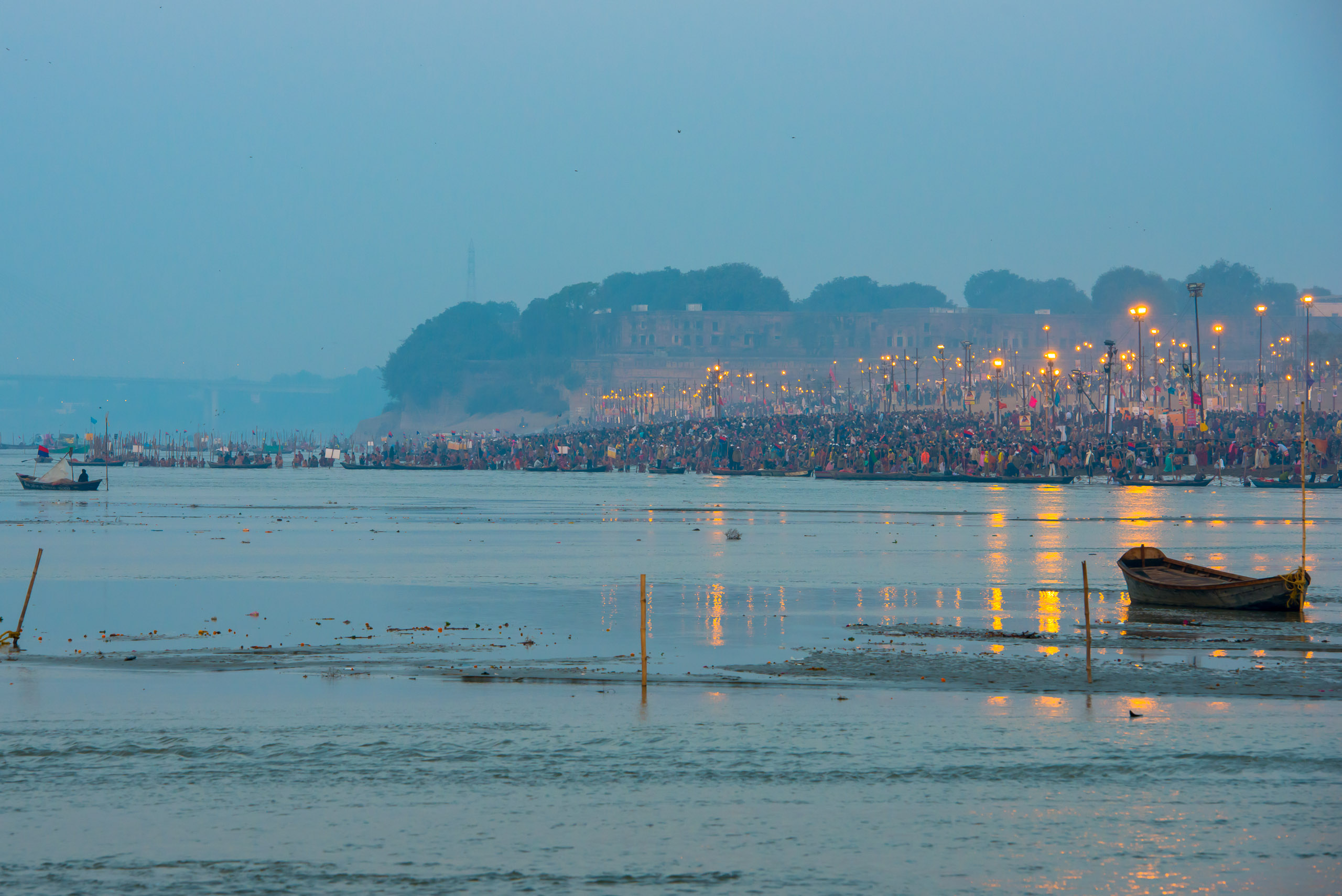
Kumbh Mela Sangam, Allahabad, Uttar Pradesh, India

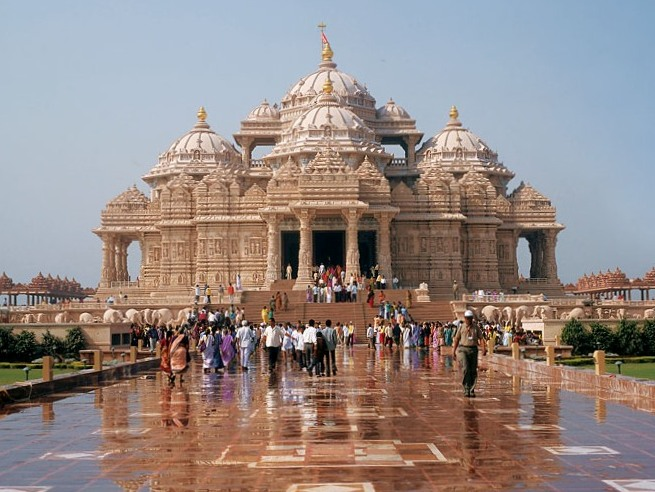
Akshardham Temple, Delhi, India

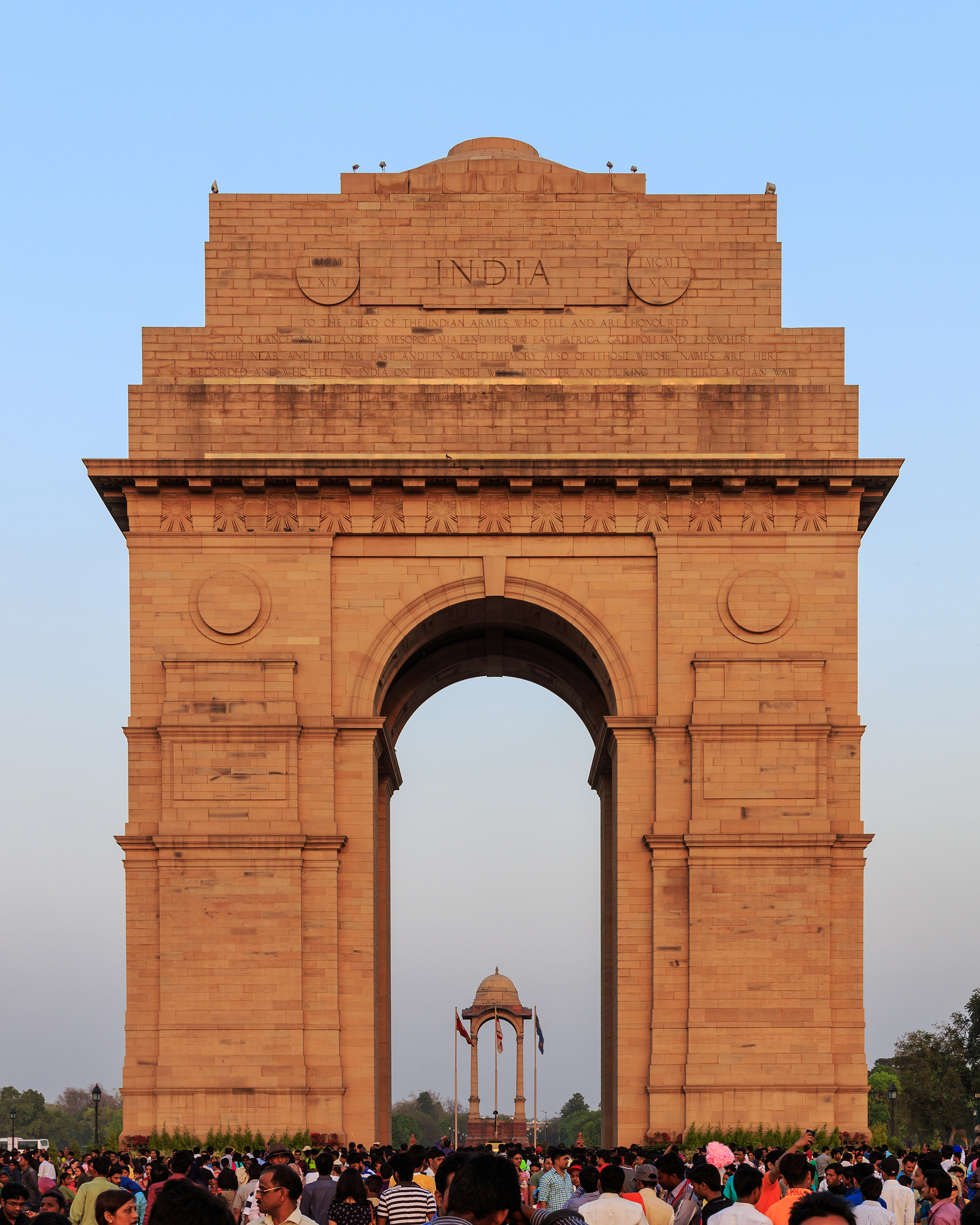
India Gate, New Delhi

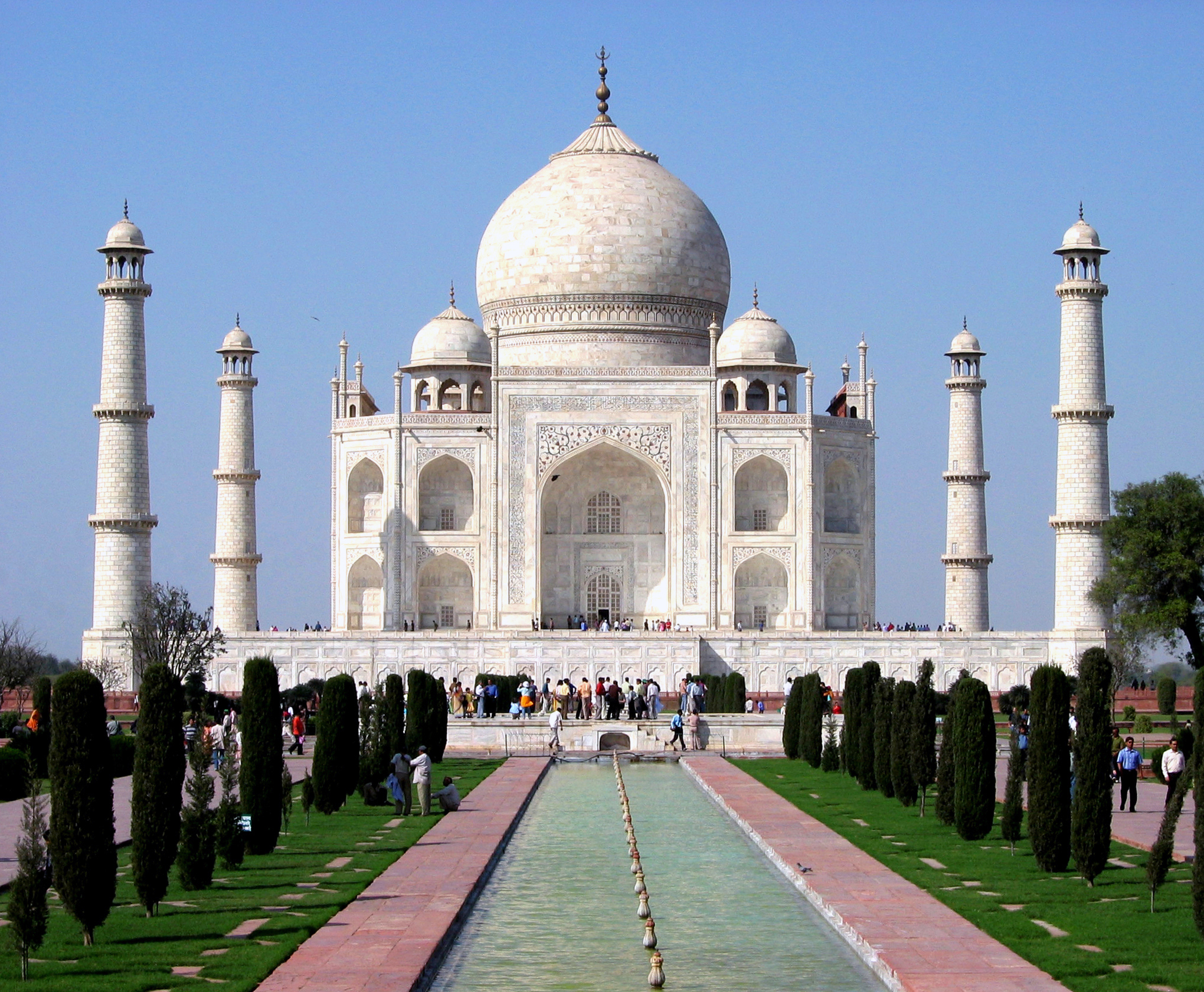
Taj Mahal, Agra, Uttar Pradesh, India

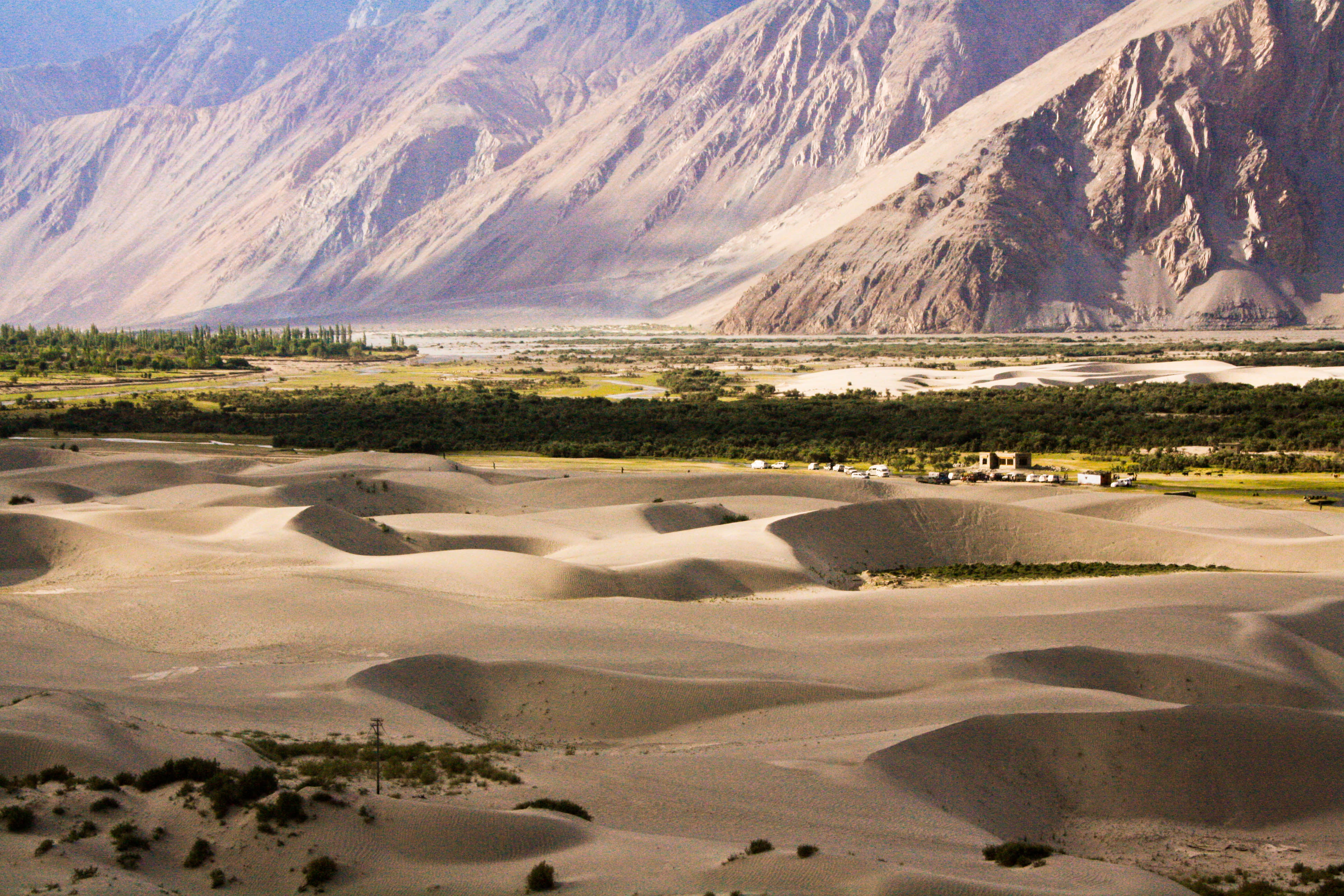
Ladakh is a popular mountaineering site for climbers and trekkers.

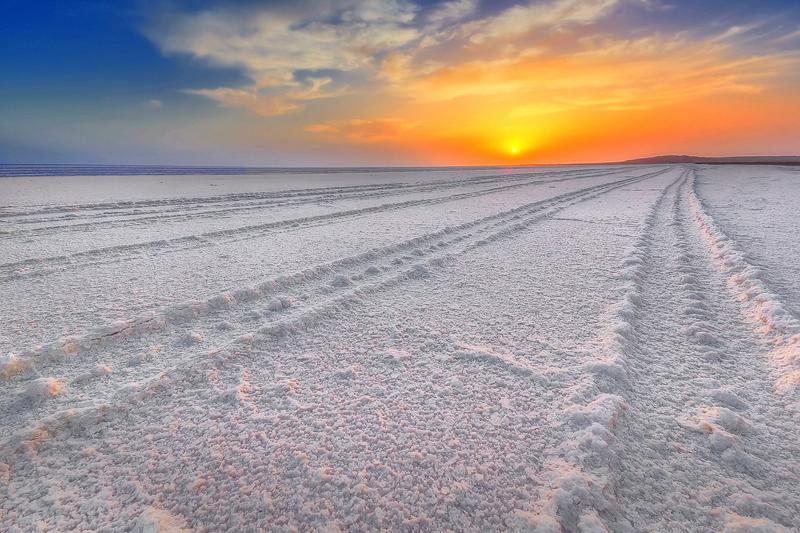
The White Rann of Kutch, Gujarat

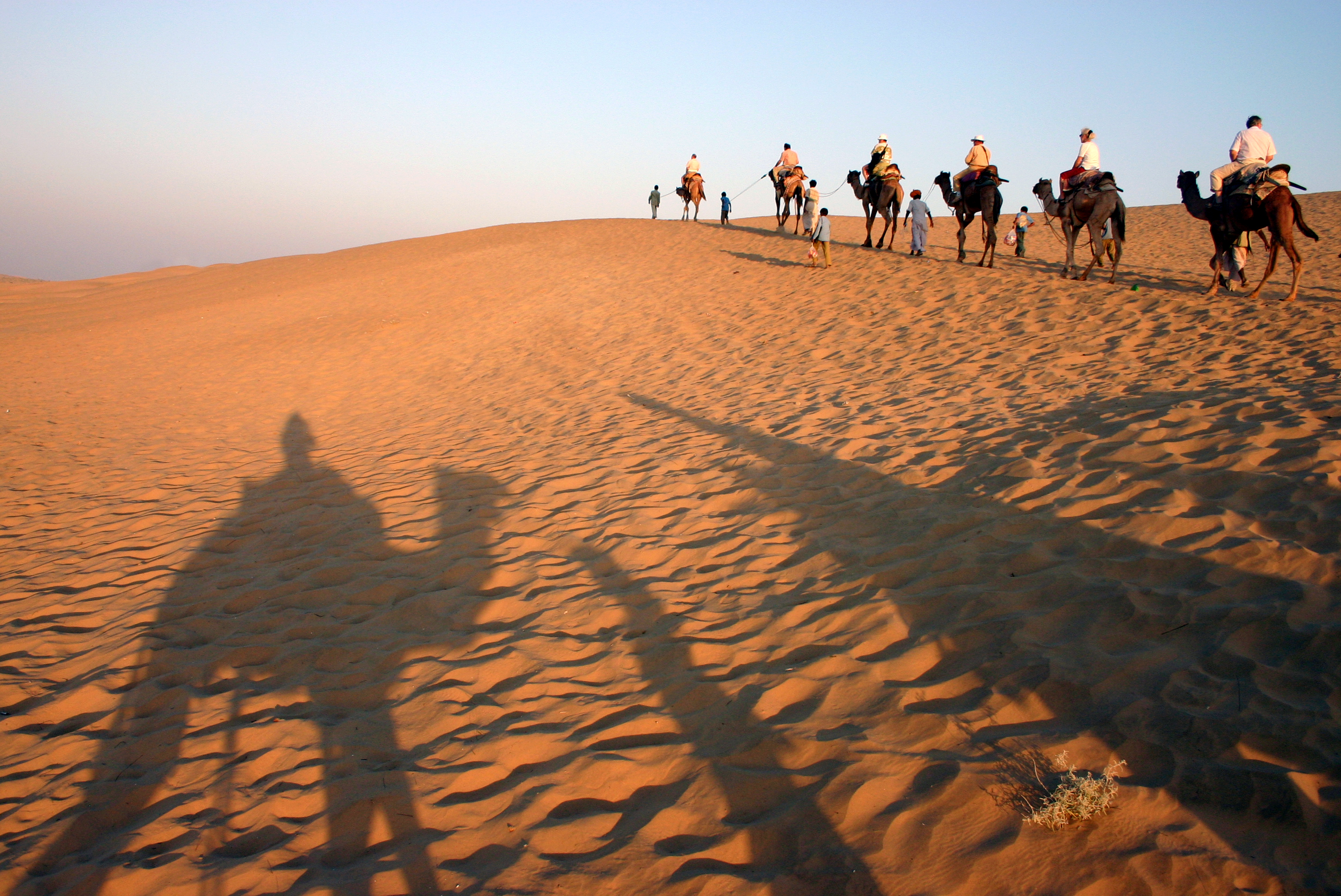
Thar Desert, Rajasthan

== See also ==
- List of international rankings
- Member state of the Commonwealth of Nations
- Member state of the Group of Twenty Finance Ministers and Central Bank Governors
- Member state of the United Nations
- Outline of Asia
- Outline of geography
