= Divisions of Punjab =

Divisions of Punjab may refer to:

- Divisions of Punjab, India
- Divisions of Punjab, Pakistan
