= Economy of Delhi =

Economy of National Capital Territory of Delhi
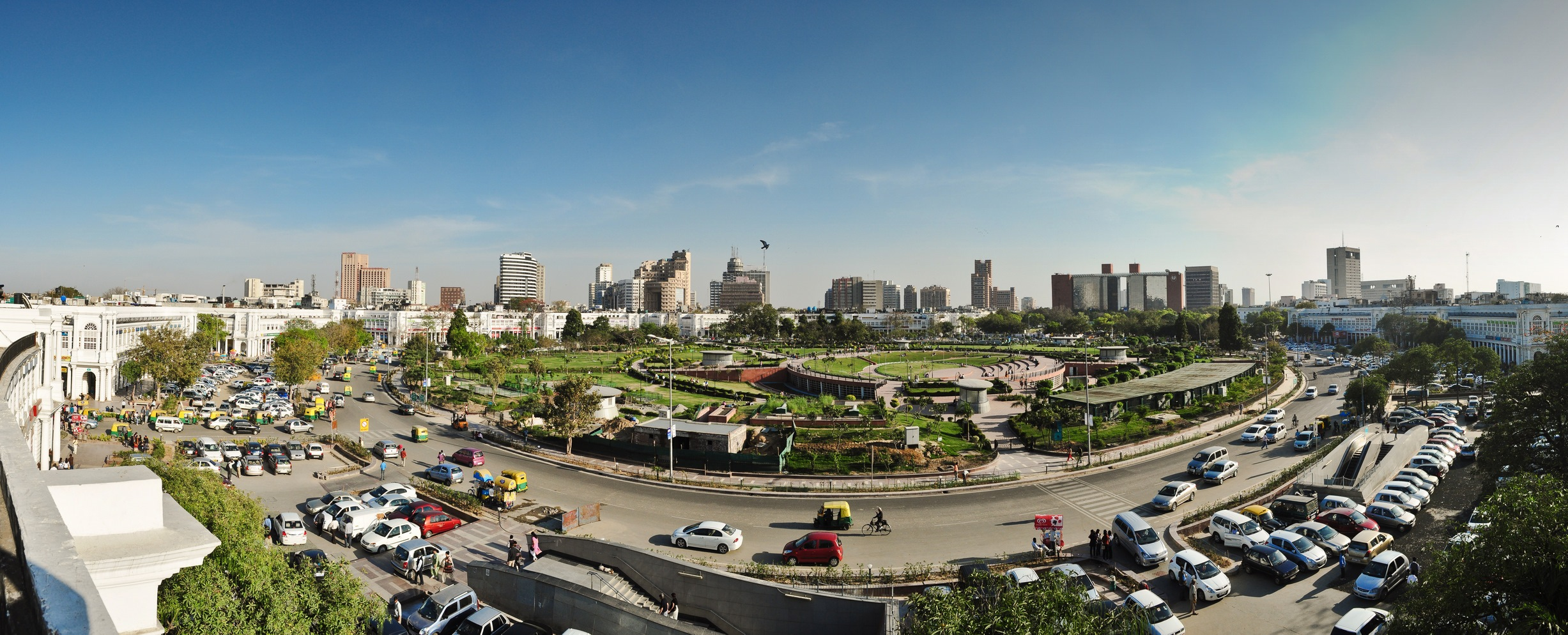
- Connaught Place in New Delhi is an important economic hub of the National Capital.
- Fiscal year: 1 April – 31 March

Statistics
- GDP: ▲US$272.603 (Metro) (Nominal) ▲₹13.27 trillion (equivalent to ₹14 trillion or US$146 billion in 2026)(nominal; 2025-26) ▲$521.5 billion (PPP; 2025-26)
- GDP rank: 16th
- GDP growth: 9.18% (2023–24)
- GDP per capita: ▲₹593,071 (equivalent to ₹610,000 or US$6,543 in 2026) (nominal; 2025-26)
- GDP per capita rank: 3rd
- GDP by sector: Agriculture 2% Industry 14% Services 84% (2021–22)
- Unemployment: ▼6.6% (Nov 2020)

Public finance
- Budget balance: ₹−9,194 crore (US$−980 million) (2022–23 est.)
- Revenue: ₹61,891 crore (US$6.6 billion) (2022–23 est.)
- Spending: ₹71,085 crore (US$7.6 billion) (2022–23 est.)
- All values, unless otherwise stated, are in US dollars.

The economy of Delhi in the National Capital Region is the 12th largest among states and union territories of India. The Nominal GSDP of the NCR was estimated at 272.603 Billion and the Nominal GSDP of the NCT of Delhi for 2023-24 was estimated at ₹11.07 lakh crore (US$120 billion) recording an annual growth of 9.2%. Growth rate in 2014-15 was 9.2%. In 2020-21, the tertiary sector contributed 85% of Delhi's GSDP followed by the secondary and primary sectors at 12% and 3% respectively. The services sector recorded an annual growth of 7.3%. Delhi is the largest commercial centre in northern India. As of 2021, recent estimates of the economy of the urban area of Delhi have ranged from $521.5 billion (PPP metro GDP) and it has $272.603 billion as (Nominal GDP) ranking it either the most or second-most productive metro area of India.

In recent times, a lot of economic, manufacturing and business activities have been attracted by Noida, Gurugram, Greater Noida, Ghaziabad, Meerut and Faridabad.

A large number of population of Delhi travels daily between Noida, Greater Noida and Gurugram for jobs.

== Manufacturing ==
Manufacturing grew considerably as consumer goods companies established manufacturing units and headquarters in the city. Delhi's large consumer market and the availability of skilled labour has also attracted foreign investment. Delhi contributes 4.94% to the total GDP of the country. In 2001, the manufacturing sector employed 1,440,000 workers and the city had 129,000 industrial units.

== Services ==
Key service industries are information technology, telecommunications, hotels, banking, media and tourism. Construction, power, health and community services and real estate are also important to the city's economy.

=== Retail ===
Delhi has one of India's largest and fastest growing retail industries.

=== Information Technology ===
As with other regions of India, the IT industry has been expanding in Delhi. Although not as robust as the IT industry in some of India's southern states, it still hosts significant IT companies such as Google India, Teleperformance India, HCL Technologies, SAP Labs India, Tata Consultancy Services, Cinfoways and SAS Institute India. Its satellite cities that fall within the NCR, such as Noida in Uttar Pradesh or Gurgaon in Haryana, are also home to a strong IT sector. According to the Industrial Policy for Delhi 2010-21, the Delhi government hopes to increase investments into and further develop the state's IT and ITeS industries. Delhi's government institutions, well-developed infrastructure, increasing workforce and business-friendly culture makes it an ideal location for such an expansion of the IT sector.

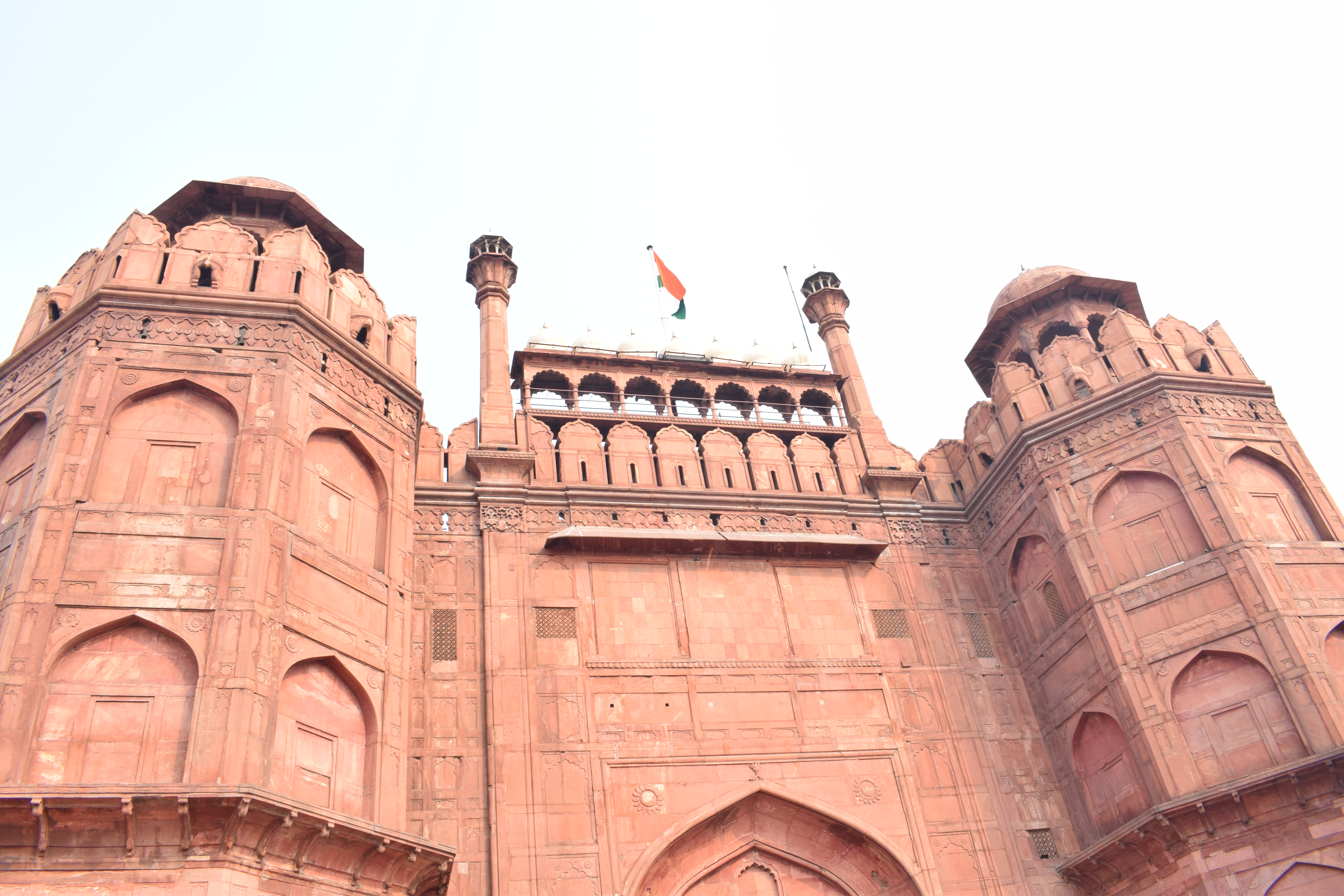
The Red Fort

=== Tourism ===
Due to its history, central position and status as the nation's capital, Delhi is a common destination for tourists. Some common tourist attractions include the Red Fort, Qutb Minar, India Gate, Jama Masjid, Humayun's Tomb, Lotus Temple, Akshardham and the Rashtrapati Bhavan. Delhi's tourism sector makes up 5.6% of its GDP and the Delhi government considers it to be "high growth industry." 62% of tourists and NRIs visiting India come to Delhi.

The World Travel & Tourism Council calculated that tourism generated US$3.2 billion or 3.6% of the city's GDP in 2016 and supported 460,300 jobs, 8.3% of its total employment. The sector is predicted to grow at an average annual rate of 10.8% to US$8.9 billion by 2026 (3.7% of GDP). Foreign tourists accounted for 35.5% of all tourism-related spending in Delhi in 2016. The largest source of foreign tourists visiting the city was the United States, which accounted for 11% of foreign tourist visits to the city.

=== Real Estate ===
The real estate sector has been another growing industry within the NCR. It boomed in the 2000s and many Indians, induced by the soaring property prices, decided to invest in real estate, especially in the growing satellite cities of Gurgaon, Noida and Greater Noida. At the real estate market's peak between 2001 and 2007, one could expect 20-30% annual returns or double their investment in about 3–5 years. By 2013 however, demand for real estate began to decline, reaching an all-time low in 2016. With sales plummeting and real estate firms ridden with debt, developers such as Unitech, Jaypee Infratech Ltd. and the Amrapali Group have slowed progress on their development projects since they lacked the necessary working capital.

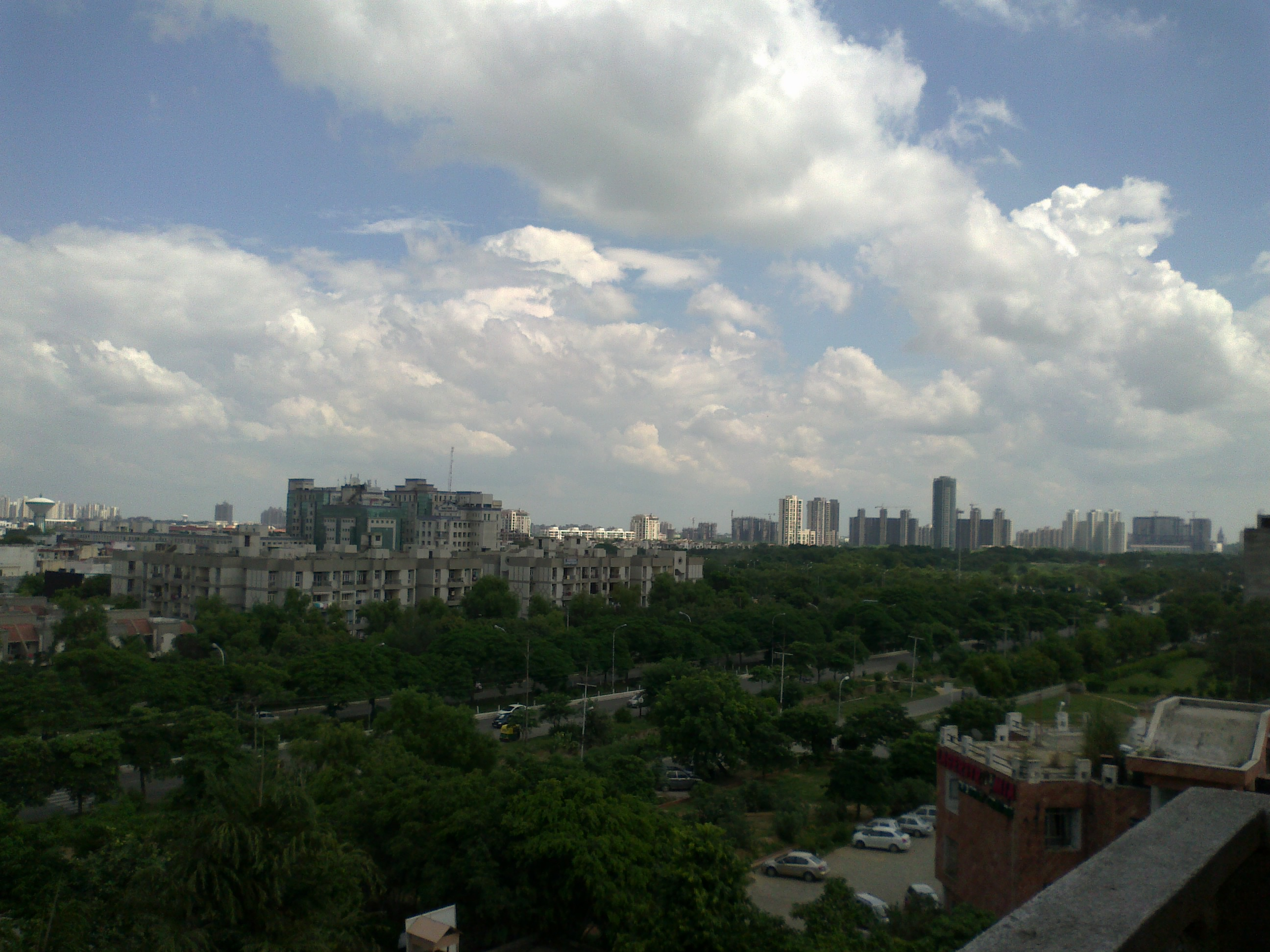
Greater Noida, one of Delhi's satellite cities

In response to the crisis, the Parliament of India passed the Real Estate (Regulation and Development) Act, 2016 to protect home-buyers and the real estate industry. The act created the Real Estate Regulatory Authority (RERA) which is responsible for regulating the real estate industry and for addressing disputes for non-delivery. The act also makes it mandatory to register real projects with a clear deadline. This was followed by the Modi government's demonetization of ₹500 and ₹1000 banknotes. One of the stated aims of such an action was to curtail the widespread use of black money in real estate transactions.

Greater compliance and transparency following the establishment of the RERA has had a stabilizing effect on the real estate market. Although the RERA has made it harder for new projects to launch, curtailing the supply-side of the real estate industry, demand has been increasing. For now, except for Gurgaon which is experiencing marginal real estate growth, home values in the Delhi NCR region remain stable.

=== Transport ===
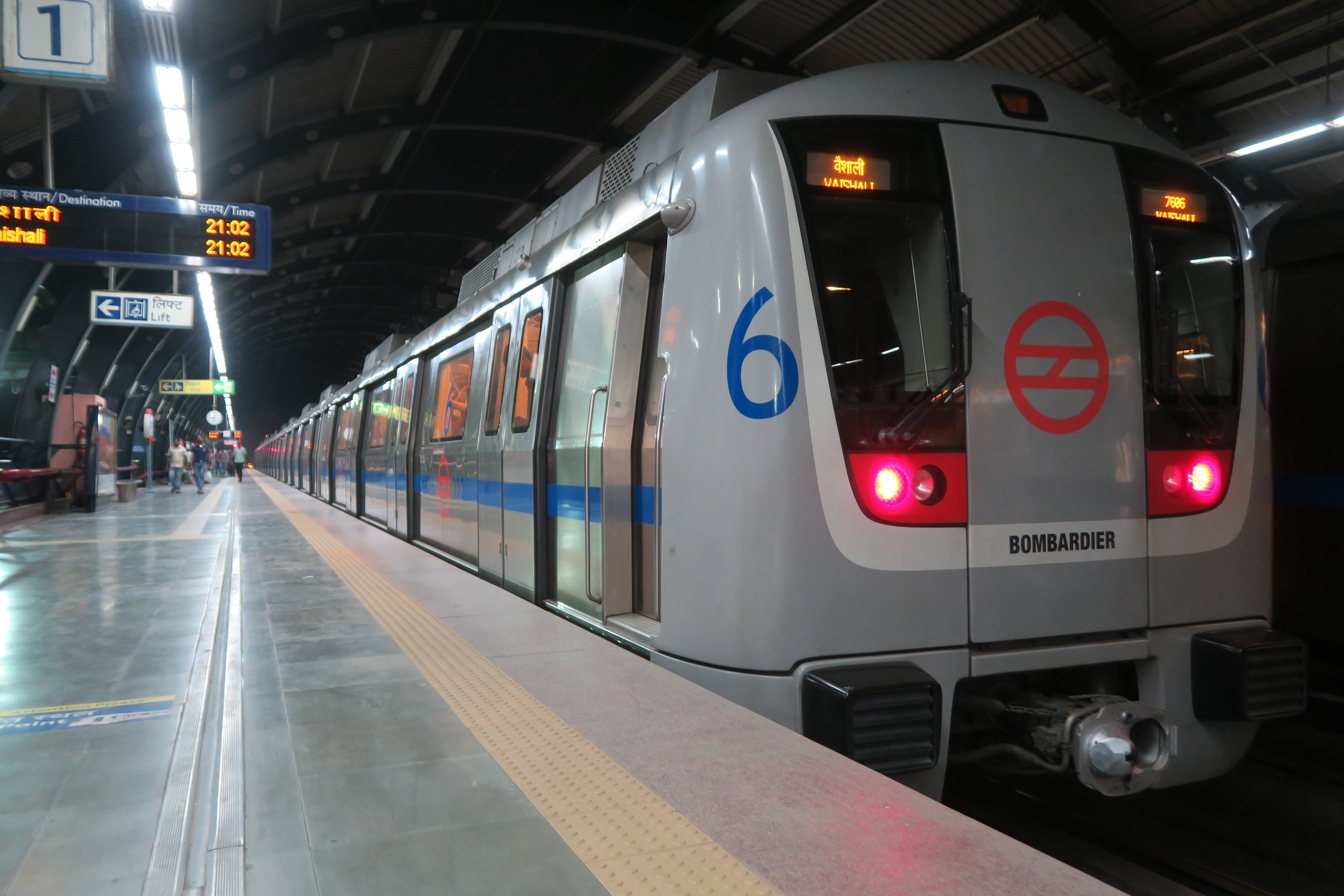
Delhi Metro

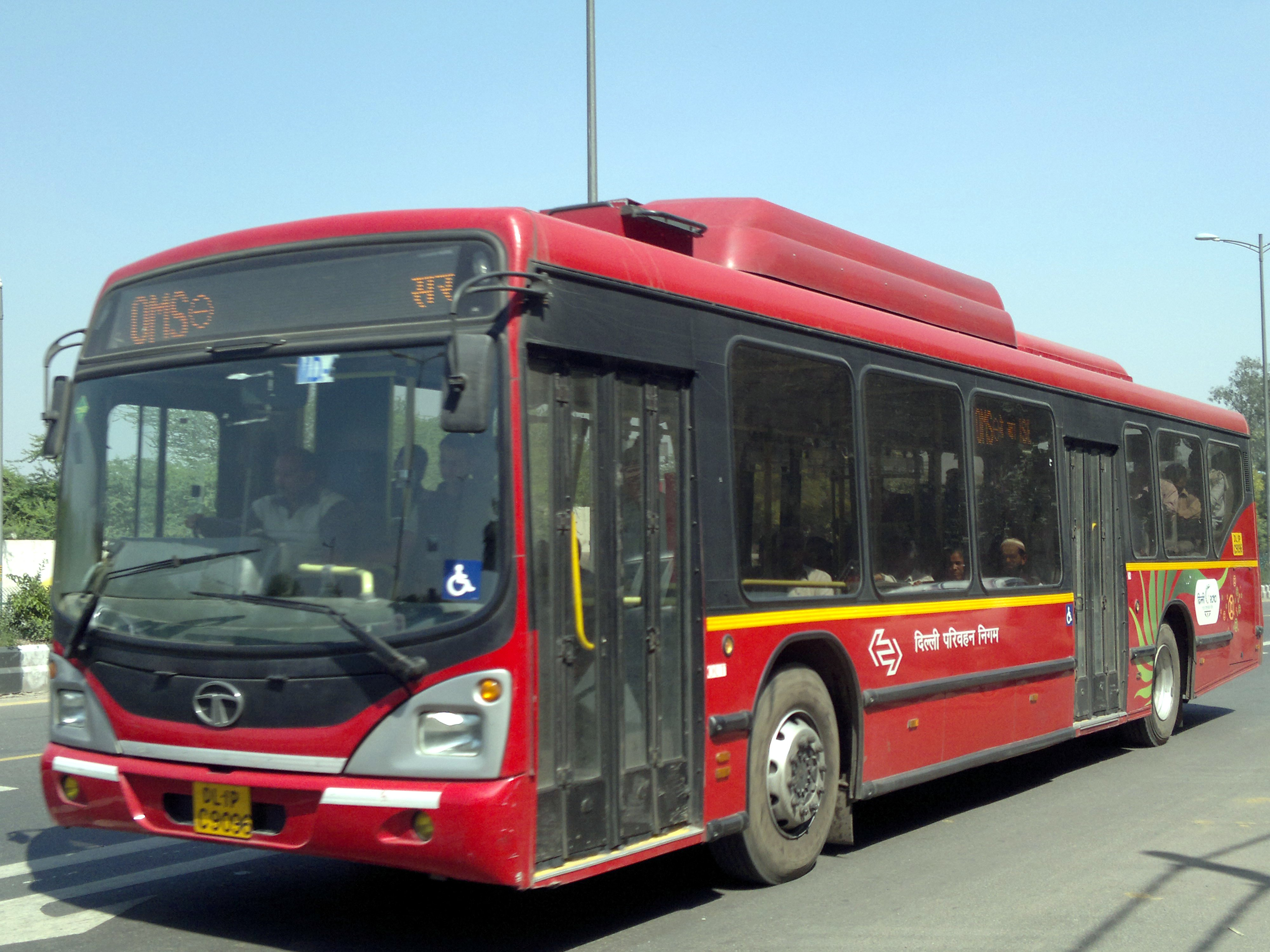
DTC AC Bus

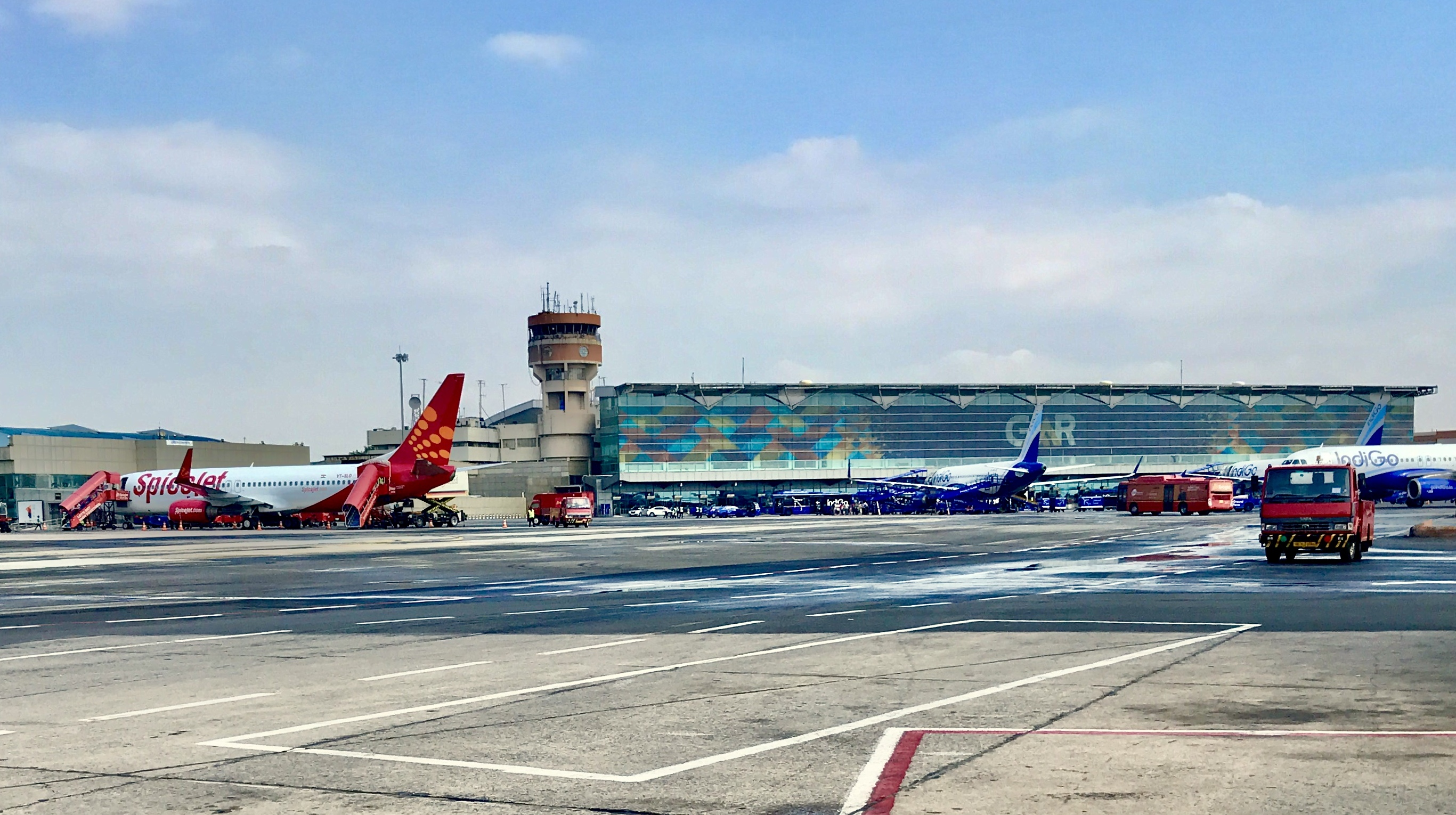
Indira Gandhi International Airport

Another key contributor to Delhi's economy is the transportation sector and the city has been investing various in transport infrastructure projects. More than half of the population in Delhi is dependent on public transport for commuting purposes. Various methods of transportation thrive in Delhi, including the Delhi Metro, trains and buses. The city's metro system in particular is a highly efficient public transport system that was initiated by the Delhi and Indian government in 1998. In 2017, the Metro brought in a revenue of ₹5,388 crore. That said, the Metro has been operating with a loss on an EBITDA basis for the past few years and, as of March 2016, its total debt stands at ₹291.5 billion.

The state-owned Delhi Transport Corporation (DTC) runs the world's largest fleet of CNG buses and one of India's largest bus transport systems. Buses are a very popular means of transportation in Delhi, accounting for about 60% of Delhi's total transport demand. Delhi used to have a Bus Rapid Transit System as well that was a much-vaunted project of the previous Sheila Dikshit-led Congress government however, due to criticisms over poor planning, the Aam Aadmi Party government dismantled the system in 2016.

Auto-rickshaws (commonly known as Auto) are also popular. Cheap, environment-friendly and easily available, these Auto-rickshaws are used both by Delhi residents going on short commutes and tourists yearning for a joyride.

Indira Gandhi International Airport, the primary civilian aviation hub for the NCR, serves Delhi's domestic and international flights and is the busiest airport in India. The airport contributes about 34.5% of the total trade transacted through all major airports of India. It serves as a hub for Air India, GoAir, SpiceJet, IndiGo and AirAsia India.

== Employment ==
As per the Economic survey of Delhi (2022–2023), Delhi's workforce constitutes 33.28% of the population (during 2011). The estimated employment rate in Delhi during the period July 2020-June 2021 was 93.7. Unemployment rate in Delhi during aforesaid period was 6.3. Female workers constitute a less percentage of workers during 2011 and it approximated up to 15% of workers in Delhi. The major shares of workers in Delhi were in the category of other workers, which includes all industrial and tertiary sector activities at it constitutes at 95%.

The workforce participation rate for Delhi residents aged above 15 years was 40.8% in 2015-16, lower than the 41.8% recorded in 2012-13. Delhi's workforce participation rate is lower than the national average of 50.5%.

The Delhi chief minister launched a job portal "Rozgar Bazar" for recruiters and job aspirants during the COVID-19 pandemic.

== See also ==
- Economy of India
- Economy of Mumbai
- Economy of Kolkata
- Economy of Haryana
- Economy of Uttar Pradesh
