= List of Indian states and union territories by Innovation Index =

This is a list of Indian states, Hilly States and union territory by Innovation Index. The NITI Aayog in collaboration with the Institute for Competitiveness developed benchmark for the innovation ecosystem among Indian States. The data for states and union territory is from niti.gov.in.
As per NITI Aayog Innovation Report Book, Innovation is defined as "creation, development and implementation of a new product, process or service, with the aim of improving efficiency, effectiveness or competitive advantage".

== Methodology ==
Delhi scored the highest at 46.6 while Lakshadweep last with a score of 11.7. But to ensure a fair comparison, states have been categorised under three segments, viz. Northeast India & Hill States, UT & City States, and Major States. The first two categories are segregated from the rest of the Indian states (or Major States) due to their geographical categories, varied sizes and administrative capabilities.
Indicators used for ranking are :-
*Five Enablers pillars ( Human capital, Investment, Knowledge worker, Business Environment, Safety and Legal Environment )
*Two Performance Pillars (Knowledge Output, Knowledge Diffusion).

== List ==
List of most technologically advanced Indian States in 2020
Rank	State	Innovation Index Score2020	Efficiency Ratio	GDP-Per Capita
8	Andhra Pradesh	24.19	0.46	₹107,241 (US$1,100)
21	Bihar	14.48	1.0	₹28,668 (US$310)
1	Delhi	46.50	1.32	₹269,505 (US$2,900)
20	Chhattisgarh	15.77	0.22	₹69,500 (US$740)
9	Gujarat	23.63	0.61	₹153,495 (US$1,600)
7	Haryana	25.81	0.58	₹169,409 (US$1,800)
18	Jharkhand	17.12	0.51	₹54,982 (US$590)
2	Karnataka	42.50	1.44	₹153,276 (US$1,600)
6	Kerala	30.58	0.65	₹148,078 (US$1,600)
15	Madhya Pradesh	20.82	0.63	₹56,498 (US$600)
3	Maharashtra	38.03	1.19	₹147,450 (US$1,600)
16	Odisha	18.94	0.80	₹76,417 (US$820)
12	Punjab	22.54	0.50	₹115,882 (US$1,200)
14	Rajasthan	20.83	0.62	₹78,570 (US$840)
4	Tamil Nadu	37.91	1.07	₹142,941 (US$1,500)
5	Telangana	33.23	1.14	₹143,618 (US$1,500)
11	Uttar Pradesh	22.85	1.76	₹44,421 (US$470)
17	Jammu & Kashmir	18.62	0.38	₹65,178 (US$700)
13	West Bengal	21.69	1.37	₹67,300 (US$720)
10	Uttarakhand	23.50	0.58	₹155,151 (US$1,700)
19	Assam	16.38	0.65	₹60,695 (US$650)

List of Indian Union territory and City States by Innovation Index Ranking
Rank	State	Innovation Index Score2020	Efficiency Ratio	GDP-Per Capita
7	Andaman and Nicobar Islands	18.89	0.25	₹130,670 (US$1,400)
2	Chandigarh	38.57	0.85	₹234,998 (US$2,500)
6	Dadra and Nagar Haveli	22.74	0.70	NA
3	Daman and Diu	26.76	1.00	NA
1	Delhi	46.50	1.32	₹269,505 (US$2,900)
5	Goa	24.92	0.25	₹368,685 (US$3,900)
8	Jammu & Kashmir	18.62	0.38	₹65,178 (US$700)
9	Lakshadweep	11.71	0.07	NA
-	Ladakh	-	-	NA
4	Puducherry	25.23	0.44	₹142,583 (US$1,500)

List of Hill & Northeast India by Innovation Index Ranking
Rank	State	Innovation Index Score2020	Efficiency Ratio	GDP-Per Capita
7	Arunachal Pradesh	14.90	0.08	₹93,191 (US$1,000)
6	Assam	16.38	0.65	₹60,695 (US$650)
1	Himachal Pradesh	25.06	0.38	₹139,469 (US$1,500)
3	Manipur	22.78	0.22	₹51,180 (US$550)
10	Meghalaya	12.15	0.26	₹66,223 (US$710)
5	Mizoram	16.93	0.21	₹107,853 (US$1,200)
8	Nagaland	14.11	0.08	₹73,276 (US$780)
4	Sikkim	20.28	0.04	₹242,002 (US$2,600)
9	Tripura	12.84	0.09	₹82,632 (US$880)
2	Uttarakhand	23.50	0.58	₹155,151 (US$1,700)

== See also ==
- Human capital
- Global Innovation Index
- List of Indian states and union territories by GDP
- List of Indian states and union territories by GDP per capita
- List of Indian Metropolitan areas by GDP
- List of Indian states and union territories by Human Development Index
- List of Indian states and union territories by literacy rate
