= Economy of Sikkim =

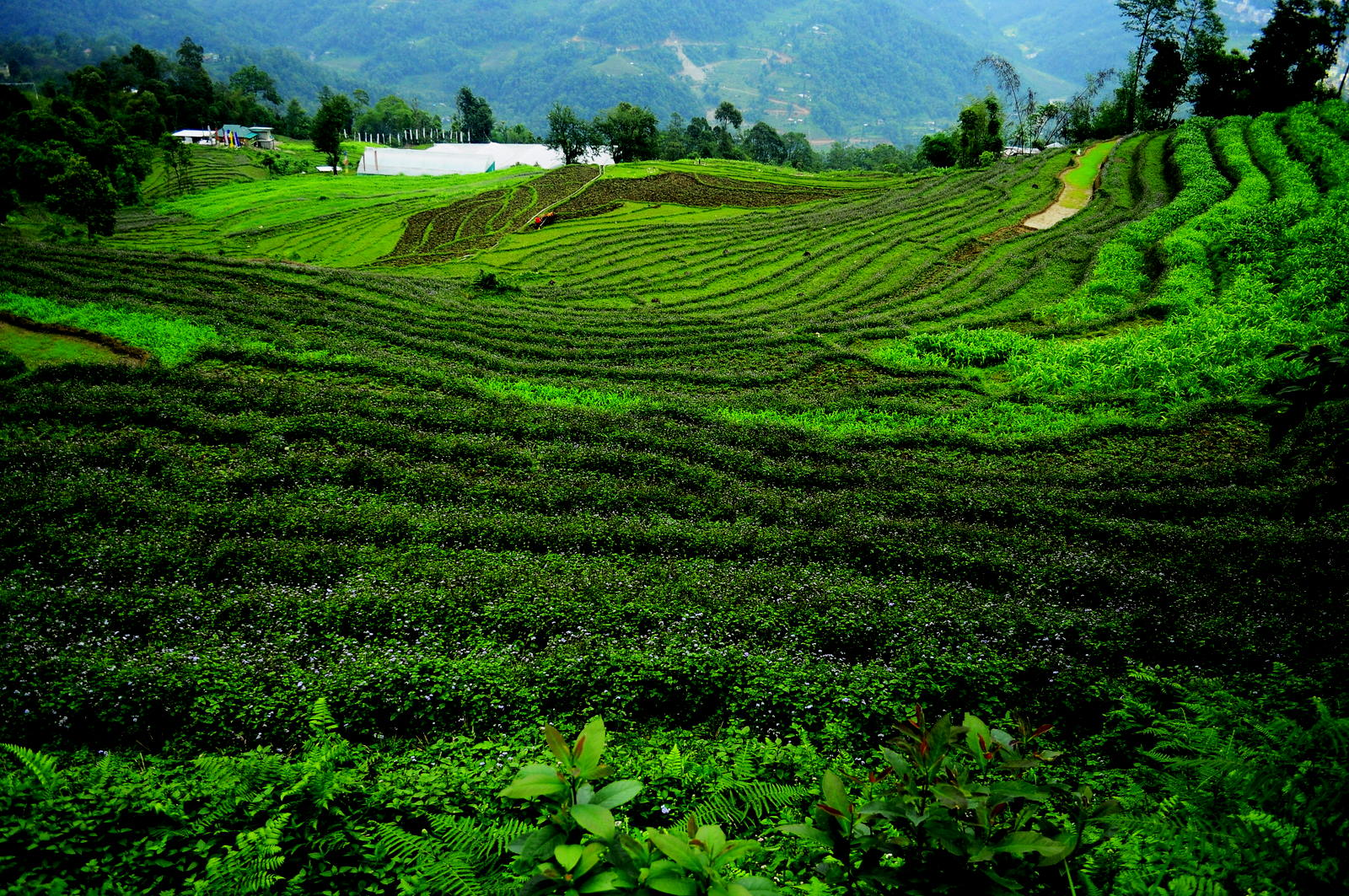
- Terrace farming in Sikkim

Statistics
- GDP: ▲₹0.63 lakh crore (US$6.5 billion) (2026-27 est.) ▲$30.95 billion (PPP, 2026-27 est.)
- GDP rank: 23rd
- GDP per capita: ▲₹763,749 (US$7,900) (2024-25 est.) ▲$43,653 (PPP, 2026-27 est.)
- GDP per capita rank: 1st
- Human Development Index: ▲High 0.755 (2023) 9th
- All values, unless otherwise stated, are in US dollars.

The economy of Sikkim, a state in northeastern India, has a significantly agricultural economy. Although having mountainous terrain, Sikkim has managed to sustain its agricultural economy through organic farming. The state of Sikkim was declared as the only 100 per cent organic state in 2016. Sikkim's industrial sector is also mostly agriculture based. Besides agriculture, other large industries include pharmaceuticals, ecotourism, and carpet weaving.

== Economy ==
In 2016, Sikkim became the world's first organic state, implementing 100% organic policy. A majority of Sikkim's population is employed in agriculture, forestry, and fishing, with 80% of the rural population employed in this sector.

In 2003, Sikkim implemented 100% Organic farming and banned chemical fertilizers and pesticides, becoming the first Indian state to do so. In January 2016, Sikkim was awarded with the Future Policy Gold Award by UN Food and Agriculture Organisation (FAO).

Sikkim is the major producer of Black cardamom in India, accounting for 88% of all cardamom produced in the country. Other major crops of the state include paddy, buckwheat, maize, barley, tea, and potatoes. Sikkim is known for its unique Temi Tea, something which the Tea Board of India is considering for a geographical indication tag.
