= Freedom struggle in Himachal Pradesh =

The hill states in India also participated in the freedom struggle (1914–1947) against the British colonial rule.

== Highlights of the struggle ==
1. Praja Mandal launched agitations against the British yoke in the areas which were under the direct British control.
2. In other princely provinces agitations were launched for social and political reforms. However, these were directed more against the princes than against the colonial government.
3. The Mandi conspiracy was carried out in between the time period of 1914 to 1915 powered by the Gadhr party. Number of meetings were organised in Mandi and Suket State in December 1914 and January 1915 and it was decided to assassinate the Superintendent and the Wazir of Mandi and Suket, to loot the treasury. However, conspirators were caught and imprisoned.
4. The Pajhota agitation in which the people of Sirmour revolted is considered as an extension of the Quit India Movement of 1942.
5. Freedom fighters of the state included Dr. Y.S. Parmar, Padam Dev, Shivanand Ramaul, Purnanand, Satya Dev, Sada Ram Chandel, Daulat Ram, Thakur Hazara Singh'Pahari Gandhi Baba Kanshi Ram, and Comrade Amin Chand
6. The Indian National Congress party was also active in the freedom struggle in the state particularly in Kangra.

== Post independence ==
1. The Chief Commissioner's province of Himachal came into existence on 15 April 1948.
2. Himachal became a part C state on 26 January 1951 with the empowerment of the Constitution of India.
3. Bilaspur merged with Himachal Pradesh on 1 July 1954.
4. Himachal Pradesh became the Union territory on 1 November 1956.
5. Kangra and many hill areas of Punjab were merged with Himachal on 1 November 1966 though its status remained that of a Union territory, in effect this was separated with the rest of the divided East Punjab province, that included Haryana.
6. On 18 December 1970 the Himachal Pradesh Act was passed by Parliament and the new state came into being on 25 January 1971. Thus, Himachal emerged as the eighteenth state of the Indian union.
7. Now, Himachal Pradesh has become economically a self-reliant state of India.
