= Economy of Assam =

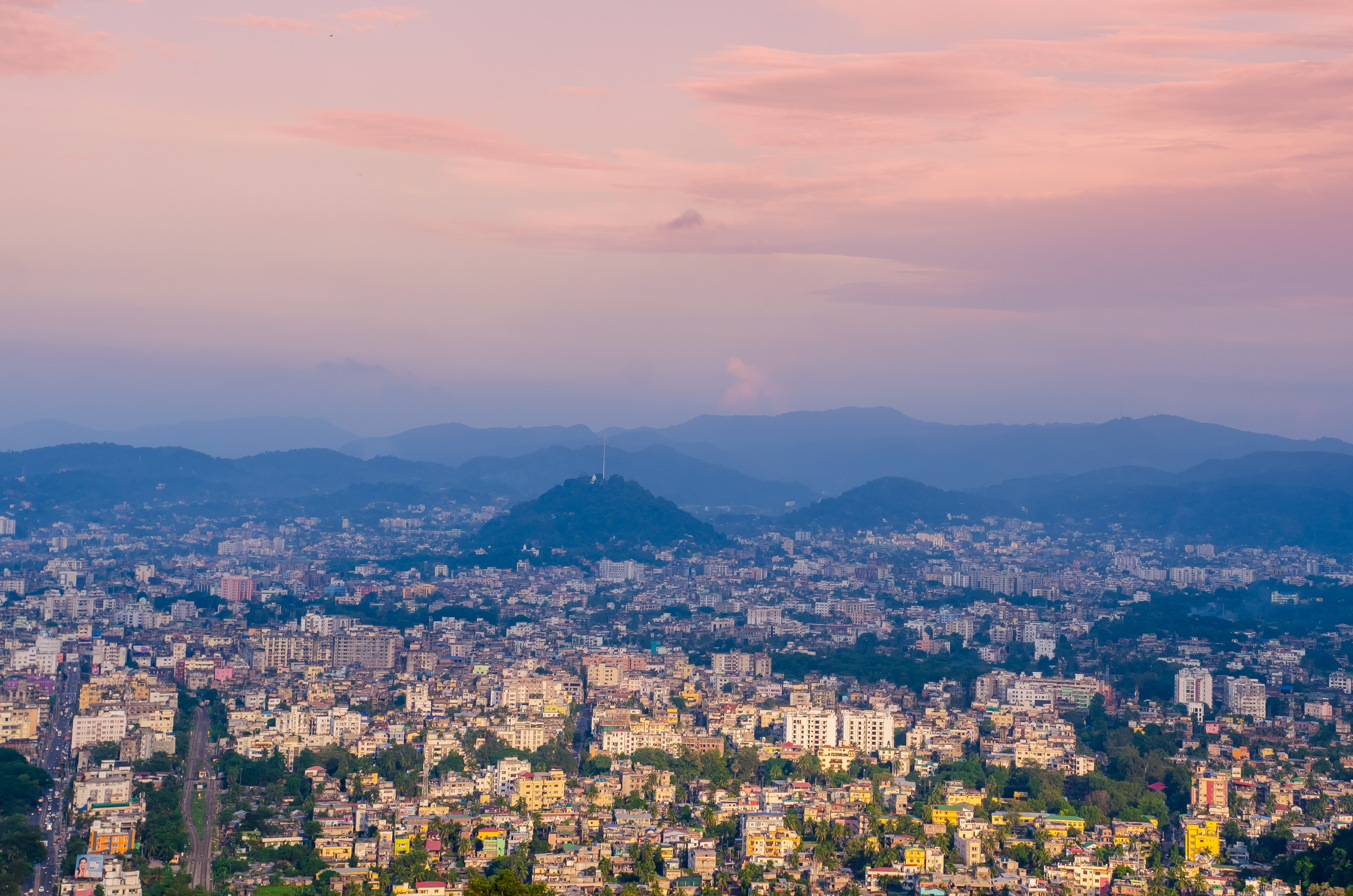
- Guwahati, the capital of Assam as viewed from atop of Nilachal hill.
- Currency: Indian rupee (INR, ₹)
- Fiscal year: 1 April – 31 March
- Country group: Developing/Emerging; Lower-middle income economy

Statistics
- GDP: ▲₹871,451 crore (US$93 billion); ~$425 billion (PPP)
- GDP rank: 17th
- GDP growth: 15% (2025-26 est.)
- GDP per capita: ▲₹203,760 (US$2,200)(nominal); ~$10,000 (PPP) (2025-26 FY)
- GDP per capita rank: 28th
- GDP by sector: Agriculture 25% Industry 30% Services 45% (2021-22)
- Population below national poverty line: ▼14.47% in poverty (2022–23)
- Human Development Index: ▲0.684 medium (2023) (26th)
- Unemployment: 4.0% (Nov 2020)

Public finance
- Government debt: 25.74% of GSDP (2022-23 est.)
- Budget balance: ₹−15,354 crore (US$−1.6 billion) (3.19% of GSDP) (2022-23 est.)
- Revenue: ₹119,244 crore (US$13 billion) (2024-25 est.)
- Spending: ₹1.46 lakh crore (US$16 billion) (2024-25 est.)
- All values, unless otherwise stated, are in US dollars.

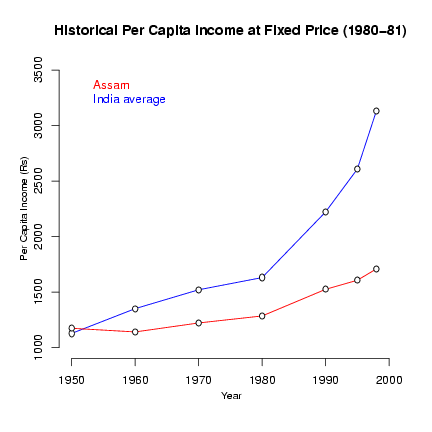
The per capita income of Assam was higher than the national average soon after Indian Independence. But it has slipped since, and the difference has become larger since liberalization of the Indian economy in the 1980s.

The Economy of Assam is largely agrarian, with a majority of the population engaged in agriculture. The real GSDP increased approximately 6.1 percent annually between 2002 and 2012, and increased approximately 7.2 percent annually between 2012 to 2025.

== Macro-economic trend ==
Assam is endowed with rich natural resources, and once had a higher than average per capita income than the national average. However, the state subsequently registered a lower than average per capita income and economic growth. In 1950-51, the per capita income was 4 percent above the national average, but in 1998-99, per capita income had dropped 41 percent below the national average at current prices and 45 percent below the national average in constant 1980-81 prices. This decrease could be attributed to a number of reasons, including the 1962 Sino-Indian War and the 1971 Indo-Pakistani War, both fought primarily in the eastern front of India. Assam also had to take in a large number of refugees from erstwhile East Pakistan after 1947 and in 1970-1971, a development exacerbated by the arrival of refugees and migrants from newly independent Bangladesh after 1971. Economic performance was affected adversely also by political and social processes within the state, including the insurgency in Northeast India, and the Assam Movement of the late 1970s and early 1980s.

Assam had a lower incidence of poverty at 51 percent in 1973-74 compared to the national average of 55 percent, but the decrease in the poverty ratio has lagged behind the national average. After economic liberation in the 1990s, economic performance initially remained below the national average, in part, due to migration from Bangladesh and the activities of insurgent groups such as the United Liberation Front of Assam. The state reduced poverty 5 percent between 1993-94 and 1999-2000, compared to the 10 percent national decrease.

Between 1951 and 1979, Assam registered an average level of real gross domestic product growth compared to the national average. However, the state's real gdp growth lagged behind the national average after 1979 due to the "tensed socio-political environment". Between 1981 and 2001, Assam's GSDP increased 3.3 percent annually compared to the national average of 6 percent. Since the 2000s, Assam has registered higher levels of real gross domestic product growth. GSDP at constant (1999-2000) prices increased 5.33 percent annually between 2002 and 2007. Real GSDP increased 6.78 percent annually between 2007 and 2012. Real GSDP at constant (2011-12) prices increased approximately 7.6 percent annually between 2012 and 2016. Real GSDP at constant (2011-12) prices increased approximately 7.0 percent annually between 2016 and 2025.

=== Macro-economic tables: 1980-2000 ===
This is a chart of the trend in the gross state domestic product of Assam at market prices between 1980 and 2000, estimated by the Ministry of Statistics and Programme Implementation with figures in millions of Indian Rupees.

Year	Gross State Domestic Product
1980	25,160
1985	56,730
1990	106,210
1995	194,110
2000	314,760

This is a chart of real GSDP growth between 1980 to 2001, including the primary sector, secondary sector, and tertiary sector.

Year	Primary	Secondary	Tertiary	GSDP
1980-1990	2.16	4.13	4.37	3.34
1990-2001	1.89	3.88	4.52	3.27
1980-2001	1.81	3.80	4.57	3.25

This is a chart of Assam state GDP at industry of origin (factor cost) in constant (1980-81) prices from 1981-82 to 1990-91, and from 1990-91 to 1999-00.

Sector	Average Growth (1980-81 to 1990-91)	Average Growth (1990-91 to 1999-00)	Percent of Total SGDP (1981-82)	Percent of Total SGDP (1990-91)	Percent of Total SGDP (1999-00)
Agriculture, Forestry, Fishing, and Logging	2.6	1.6	41.6	38.3	33.5
Mining and Quarrying	0.1	2.0	5.2	3.8	3.4
Manufacturing	2.4	3.4	7.7	6.9	7.1
Construction	3.7	2.4	4.3	4.3	4.1
Electricity, Gas, and Water Supply	9.4	0.9	1.2	1.9	1.6
Trade, Transport, Banking, and Other Services	4.9	4.5	40.1	44.7	50.3
Gross State Domestic Product	3.6	3.1	100	100	100

== Agriculture and Livestock ==
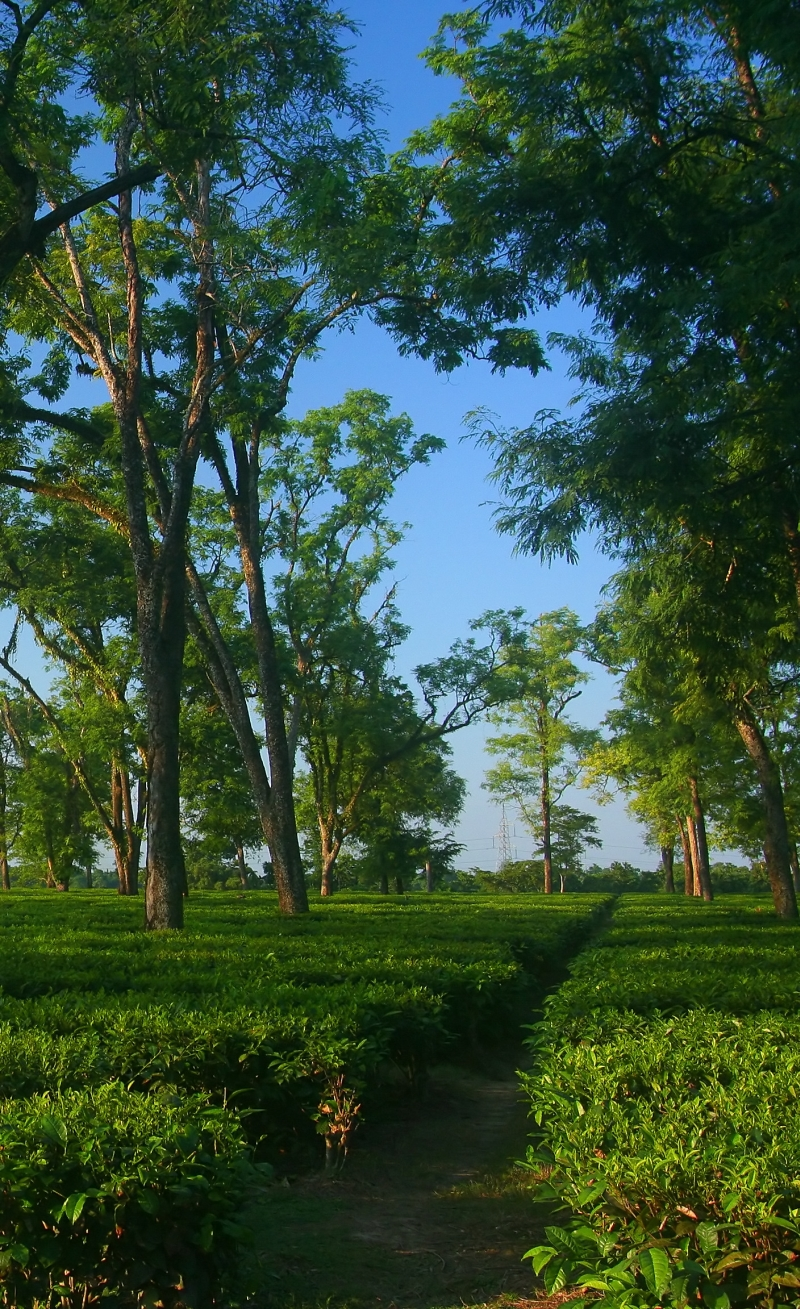
A tea garden in Assam

Agriculture accounts for more than a third of Assam's income and employs 69 percent of total workforce. Assam's biggest contribution to the world is its tea. Assam produces some of the finest and most expensive teas in the world. Other than the Chinese tea variety Camellia sinensis, Assam is the only region in the world that has its own variety of tea, called Camellia assamica. Assam tea is grown at elevations near sea level, giving it a malty sweetness and an earthy flavor, as opposed to the more floral aroma of highland (e.g. Darjeeling, Taiwanese) teas. Assam also accounts for fair share of India's production of rice, rapeseed, mustard, jute, potato, sweet potato, banana, papaya, areca nut and turmeric. Assam is also a home of large varieties of citrus fruits, leaf vegetables, vegetables, useful grasses, herbs, spices, etc. which are mostly subsistence crops.

Given below is a table of 2015 national output share of select agricultural crops and allied segments in Assam based on 2011 prices

Segment	National Share %
Tea	60.0
Pineapple	18.1
Arecanut	14.8
Narcotics	12.7
Jackfruit	10.4
Garlic	9.8
Ginger	9.3
Cabbage	9.1
Inland fish	9.0
Radish	8.5
Cucumber	7.4
Orange	7.0
Niger seed	6.5
Litchi	6.1
Carrot	6.0
Jute	5.9
Condiments and spices	5.6
Coffee	5.3
Betel	5.1
Bitter gourd	5.1

Assam's agriculture has yet to experience modernisation in a real sense and is lagging behind. With implications to food security, per capita food grain production has declined in past five decades. On the other hand, although productivity of crops increased marginally, still these are much lower in comparison to highly productive regions. For instance, yield of rice, which is staple food of Assam, was just 1531 kg per hectare against India's 1927 kg per hectare in 2000-2001 (which itself is much lower than Egypt’s 9283, United States's 7279, South Korea’s 6838, Japan's 6635 and China's 6131 kg per hectare in 2001). On the other hand, although having a strong domestic demand, 1.5 million hectares of inland water bodies and numerous rivers and streams and 165 varieties of fishes, fishing is still in its traditional form and production is not self-sufficient.

== Oil and Gas ==
Assam is a major producer of crude oil and natural gas in India. It was placed as the second in the world, (after Titusville in the United States) where petroleum was discovered. Asia's first successful mechanically drilled oil well was drilled in Makum (Assam) way back in 1867. The second oldest oil well in the world still produces crudes oil. Most of the oilfields of Assam are located in the Upper Assam region of the Brahmaputra Valley. Assam has four oil refineries located at Guwahati, Digboi, Numaligarh and Bongaigaon with a total capacity of 7 million tonnes per year. The Bongaigaon Refinery and Petrochemicals Limited (BRPL) is the only S&P CNX 500 conglomerate with a corporate office in Assam. One of the biggest public sector oil company of the country, Oil India Ltd., has its plant and headquarters in Duliajan.

== Other Industries ==
Apart from tea and petroleum refineries, Assam has few industries of significance. Industrial development is inhibited by its physical and political isolation from neighbouring countries such as Myanmar, China and Thailand and from the other growing South East Asian economies. The region is landlocked and situated in the easternmost periphery of India and is linked to the central India by a flood and cyclone prone narrow corridor with weak transportation infrastructure. The international airport in Guwahati finds airlines providing better direct international flights. The Brahmaputra suitable for navigation does not have sufficient infrastructure for international trade and success of such a navigable trade route will be dependent on proper channel maintenance, and diplomatic and trade relationships with Bangladesh.

Although having a poor overall industrial performance, there are several other industries, including a chemical fertiliser plant at Namrup, petrochemical industries at Namrup and Bongaigaon, paper mills at Jagiroad, Panchgram and Jogighopa, sugar mills at Barua Bamun Gaon, Chargola, Kampur, cement plant at Bokajan, cosmetics plant of Hindustan Unilever(HUL) at Doom Dooma, etc. Moreover, there are other industries such as jute mill, textile and yarn mills, silk mill, etc. Many of these industries are facing loss and closer due to lack of infrastructure and improper management practices.
