= Income in India =

Income in India discusses the financial state in India. With rising economic growth, India's income is also rising. As an overview, India's per capita net national income or NNI is ₹2,08,090 in 2025–26. The per capita income is a crude indicator of the prosperity of a country. According to a 2021 report by the Pew Research Center, India has roughly 1.2 billion lower-income individuals, 10 million middle-income individuals, 1 million upper-middle-income individuals, and barely 100,000 in the high-income group. According to The Economist, 14 million of India's population are considered middle class as of 2017, if defined using the cutoff of those making more than $10 per day, a standard used by India's National Council of Applied Economic Research. According to the World Bank, only a little less than 90% of India's population lived on less than $10 per day, and more than 95% lived on less than $20 per day in 2021.

== Financial year data ==
GDP per capita, GNI per capita and NNI per capita of India
Year	At current prices (INR)			At 2022-23 prices (INR)		
Year	GDP per capita	GNI per capita	NNI per capita	GDP per capita	GNI per capita	NNI per capita
2025-26	243,803	240,769	208,090	227,447	224,307	193,480
2024-25	234,859	231,462	205,324	133,501	131,556	114,710
2023-24	211,725	208,633	184,205	124,600	122,766	106,744
2022-23	194,879	192,201	169,496	116,216	114,478	99,404
2021-22	172,422	170,392	150,906	109,762	108,345	94,054
2020-21	146,301	144,334	127,065	100,981	99,578	86,054
2019-20	149,701	148,261	132,115	108,247	107,191	94,270
2018-19	142,328	140,804	125,883	105,526	104,377	92,241
2017-18	130,061	128,655	115,224	100,035	98,925	87,586
2016-17	118,489	116,070	103,870	94,752	93,639	83,003
2015-16	107,342	106,096	94,797	88,617	87,565	77,659
2014-15	98,405	97,241	86,647	83,091	82,107	72,805
2013-14	89,796	88,678	79,118	78,348	77,370	68,572
2012-13	80,519	79,573	70,983	74,600	73,722	65,538
2011-12	71,610	70,980	63,462	71,610	70,980	63,462

== Estimates ==
The Periodic Labour Force Survey (PLFS) of India in its 2026 report states that the average earnings of workers in the January-December 2025 period were as follows: regular wage/salaried (₹21,285 per month), self-employed (₹12,144 per month) and casual (₹11,550 for 30 days).

Average earnings (rupees) in January-December 2025 (PLFS)
Employment	Male	Female	Average
Self-employed (per month)	17,914	6,374	12,144
Regular wage/salaried (per month)	24,217	18,353	21,285
Casual (for 30 days)	13,650	9,450	11,550

Percentage distribution of employment in 2025 (PLFS)
Employment	Share
Self-employed	56.2%
Regular wage/salaried	23.6%
Casual	20.2%

The International Labour Organization in its report India Employment Report 2024: Youth Employment, Education and Skills states that the average earning of regular salaried workers (₹19,010) was considerably higher than those of self-employed (₹11,973) and casual (₹8,267) workers in 2022.

Average monthly earnings in 2022 (rupees, nominal value)
Employment	Rural	Urban	Total
Self-employed	10,201	17,991	11,973
Regular salaried	15,177	21,826	19,010
Casual	7,997	9,749	8,267

Number and share of employment (aged 15+) in 2022
Employment	Number (million)	Share
Self-employed	304.1	55.8%
Regular salaried	118.1	21.5%
Casual	122.2	22.7%

The Draft Red Herring Prospectus (DRHP) filed by the National Stock Exchange of India (NSE) in 2026 has categorized Indian households into four categories: low income, lower middle class, upper middle class and high income.

Income categories in India (NSE, 2026)
Income group	Annual household income	Household number and percentage
Low income	Less than ₹3 lakh	119 million (34.10%)
Lower middle class	₹3 lakh – ₹8 lakh	110 million (31.52%)
Upper middle class	₹8 lakh – ₹10 lakh	74 million (21.20%)
High income	Above ₹10 lakh	46 million (13.18%)

India's nominal per capita income was US$2,878 per year in 2025, ranked 136th out of 188 countries by the International Monetary Fund (IMF). On the other hand in terms of GDP per capita adjusted for purchasing power parity, it was $12,132 which ranked 119th out of 187 countries. Other estimates for per capita gross national income and gross domestic product vary by source. For example, India's average GDP per capita on a PPP basis in 2009, according to The Economist, was US$5,138, with significant variation among its states and union territories. Goa had the highest per capita PPP GDP at US$47,713 which is higher than Slovakia while Bihar had the lowest with a per capita PPP GDP of US$3,742 which is lower than Uganda as of 2025 In rupee terms, India's per capita income grew by 10.4% to reach ₹74,920 in 2013–14.

While India's per capita incomes were low, the average household size and consequent household incomes were higher. India had a total of 247 million households in 2011, with an average of about 4.9 people per household, according to Census of India.

Estimates for average household income and the size of India's middle-income households vary by source. Using the World Bank's definition of middle-income families to be those with per capita income between $10 and $50 per day, the National Council of Applied Economic Research of India completed a survey and concluded there were 153 million people who belonged to middle-income group in 2006. In contrast, Meyer and Birdsall and Tim Light used a different survey and estimated the Middle-Income population to be about 70 million in 2009–2010. These groups, as well as the World Bank, estimated in their 2011 reports that if India's economy continues to grow per projections, India's middle-income group would double by 2015 over 2010 levels, and grow by an additional 500 million people by 2025. This would make it with China, the world's largest middle-income market.

Compared to other countries, income inequality in India is relatively small as measured by Gini coefficient. India had a Gini coefficient of 32.5 in the year 1999- 2000; India's nominal Gini index rose to 36.8 in 2005, while real Gini after tax remained nearly flat at 32.6.

The states of India have significant disparities in their average income. Bihar was by far the poorest in India, with a gdp per capita of $1000. Income was low in even within its neighbouring states who are also among India’s poorest regions such as Uttar Pradesh, Jharkhand, Jammu and Kashmir, Assam, Manipur, and Nagaland. The higher income regions include Goa, Delhi, Haryana, Sikkim, Telangana, Maharashtra, Tamil Nadu, Gujarat, Himachal Pradesh, Punjab, Uttarakhand, and Kerala.

== Rural-urban gap ==
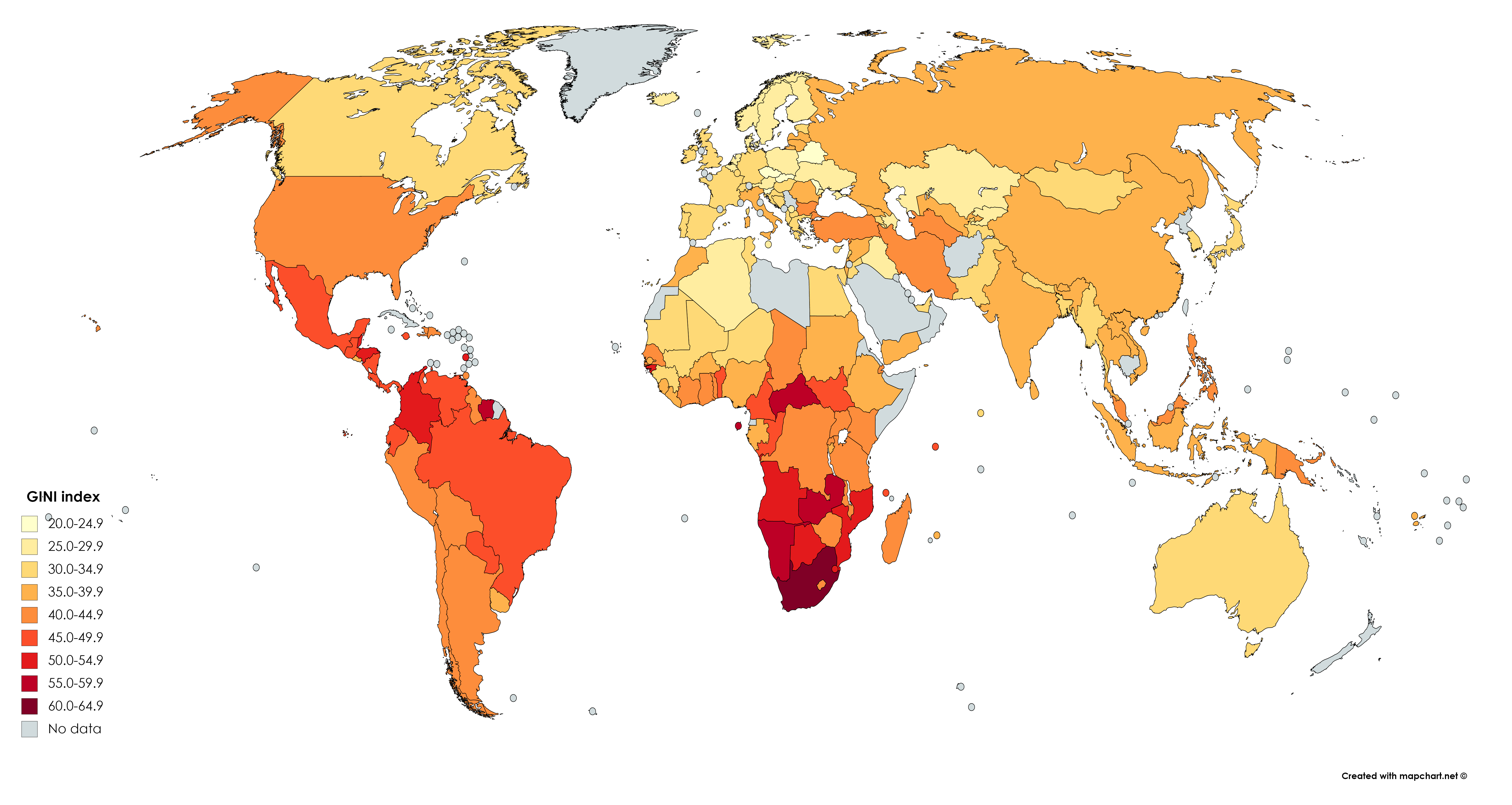
Gini coefficient of India and other countries according to the World Bank (2018). Higher Gini Index means more income inequality.

As in other countries, residents of Indian cities have a higher per capita income and standard of living than rural residents. Towns and cities make up more than two-thirds of the Indian GDP, even though less than a third of the population lives in them.

The Economic Survey of India 2007 by OECD concluded that:

"At the state level, economic performance is much better in states with a relatively liberal regulatory environment than in the relatively more restrictive states".

The analysis of this report suggests that the differences in economic performance across states are associated with the extent to which states have introduced market-oriented reforms. Thus, further reforms on these lines, complemented with measures to improve infrastructure, education and basic services, would increase the potential for growth outside of agriculture and thus boost better-paid employment, which is a key to sharing the fruits of growth and lowering poverty.

== Statistics ==
Percentage share in total national household disposable income by Class (2016)
1. Quintile 5 (Top 20%) (44.9%)
2. Quintile 4 (22.1%)
3. Quintile 3 (15.2%)
4. Quintile 2 (10.8%)
5. Quintile 1 (Bottom 20%) (7.00%)
Distribution of Annual Household Income in India (in pounds/annum)
1. <£2,000 (50.0%)
2. £2,000 to £4,500 (30.0%)
3. £4,500 to £11,000 (14.0%)
4. £11,000 to £23,000 (4.00%)
5. >£24,000 (2.00%)

Taxpayers in India by Group
Income Group	No. of taxpayers (in lakhs)
Up to ₹5 lac	445
₹5-10 lac	101
₹10-20 lac	32.11
₹20-50 lac	12.31
₹50 lac to ₹1 crore	2.25
Over ₹1 crore	1.08
Source: IT Department

== See also ==
- List of Indian states and union territories by GDP per capita
- List of Indian states and union territories by GDP
- Poverty in India
- Economy of India
