= Economy of Uttarakhand =

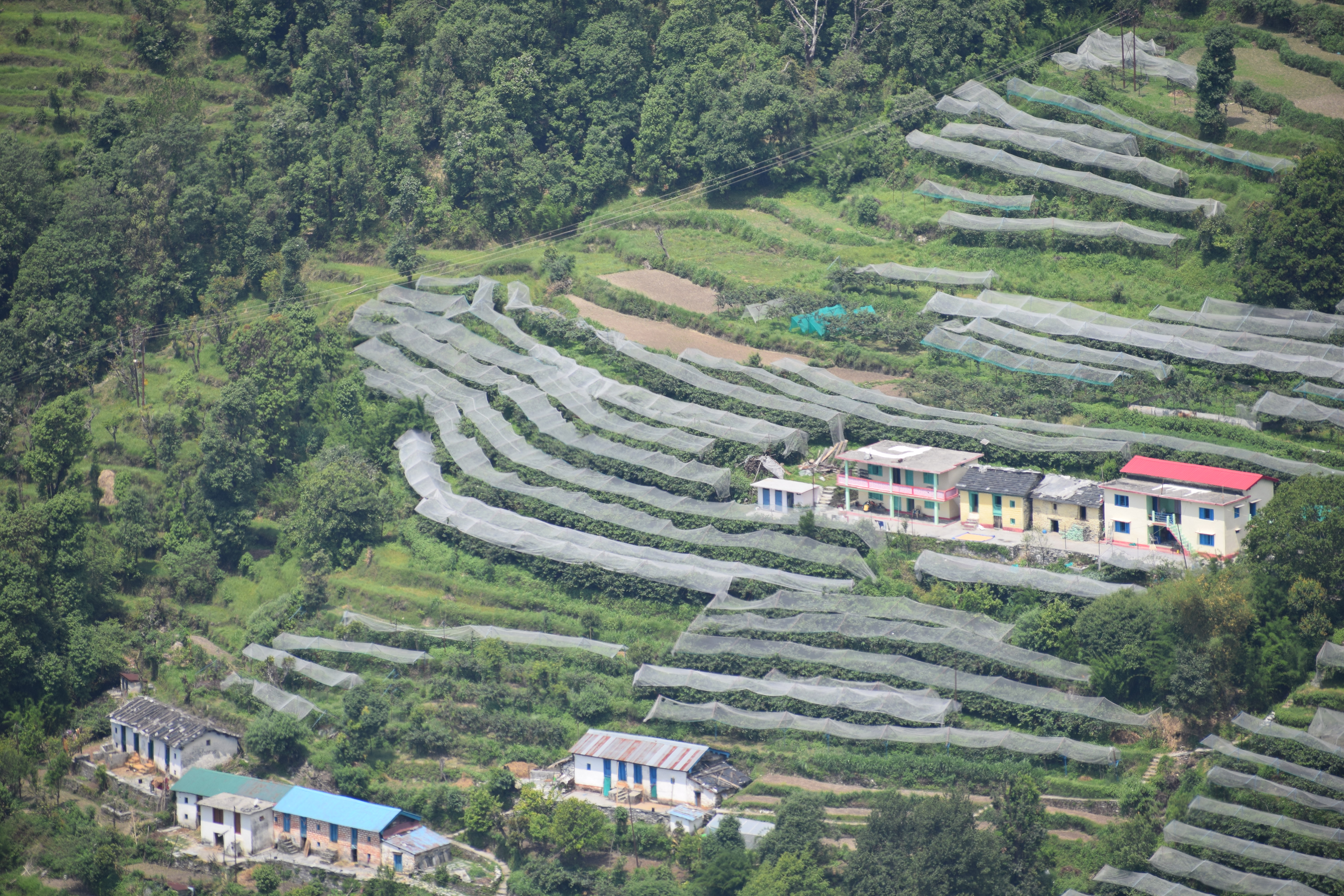
- Kiwi Horticulture in Shama, Bageshwar, Uttarakhand

Statistics
- GDP: ▲$50.5 billion(nominal; 2025 est.) ▲$212.8 billion (PPP; 2025 est.)
- GDP rank: 22nd
- GDP growth: 13% (FY 2025-26)
- GDP per capita: ▲$4,176(nominal; 2025 est.) ▲$17,595 (PPP; 2025 est.)
- GDP per capita rank: 12th
- GDP by sector: Agriculture 10% Industry 47% Services 43% (FY 2023-24)
- Inflation (CPI): ▼3.81% (2025)
- Population below national poverty line: ▼6.92% (2023)
- Unemployment: 1.5% (Nov 2020)

Public finance
- Government debt: 24.4% of GSDP (2020-21 est.)
- Budget balance: ₹−7,550 crore (US$−790 million) (2.57% of GSDP) (2020-21 est.)
- Revenue: ₹42,474 crore (US$4.4 billion) (2020-21 est.)
- Spending: ₹53,527 crore (US$5.6 billion) (2020-21 est.)
- All values, unless otherwise stated, are in US dollars.

Uttarakhand's gross state domestic product for 2024-2025 is estimated at $45 billion at current prices.

The Uttarakhand state is the second fastest growing state in India. Its gross state domestic product (GSDP) (at constant prices) increased more than 13 times from ₹24,786 crore in FY 2005 to ₹3.33 lakh crore in FY23-24. The real GSDP grew at 13.7% (CAGR) during the FY 2005–FY2012 period. The contribution of the service sector to the GSDP of Uttarakhand was just over 50% during FY 2012. Per capita income in Uttarakhand is ₹2,61,173 (FY 2023) which is higher than the national average of ₹2.12 lakh (FY 2023). According to the Reserve Bank of India, the total foreign direct investment in the state from April 2000 to October 2009 amounted to US$46.7 million.

Like most of India, agriculture is one of the most significant sectors of the economy of Uttarakhand. Basmati rice, wheat, soybeans, groundnuts, coarse cereals, pulses, and oil seeds are the most widely grown crops. Fruits like apples, oranges, pears, peaches, litchis, and plums are widely grown and important to the large food processing industry. Agricultural export zones have been set up in the state for leechi, horticulture, herbs, medicinal plants, and basmati rice. During 2010, wheat production was 831 thousand tonnes and rice production was 610 thousand tonnes, while the main cash crop of the state, sugarcane, had a production of 5058 thousand tonnes. As 86% of the state consists of hills, the yield per hectare is not very high. 86% of all croplands are in the plains while the remaining is from the hills.

Other key industries include tourism and hydropower, and there is prospective development in IT, ITES, biotechnology, pharmaceuticals and automobile industries. The service sector of Uttarakhand mainly includes tourism, information technology, higher education, and banking.

The daily electricity demand in Uttarakhand is 2600 MW. Only 800-1200 MW are produced locally.

During 2005–2006, the state successfully developed three Integrated Industrial Estates (IIEs) at Haridwar, Pantnagar, and Sitarganj; Pharma City at Selaqui; Information Technology Park at Sahastradhara (Dehradun); and a growth centre at Siggadi (Kotdwar). Also in 2006, 20 industrial sectors in public private partnership mode were developed in the state.

== Uttarakhand Budget 2016-17: Main highlights ==
Uttarakhand Finance Minister Indira Hridayesh presented Uttarakhand Budget 2016-17 (UK Budget 2016–17)

Receipts

- Total revenue receipts of 2016–17 is estimated to be ₹32,275.87 crore.
- Total receipts in financial year 2016–17 estimated to be ₹39,912.00 crore.

Expenditure

- Total expenditure in financial year 2016–17 estimated to be ₹40,422.20 crore.
- Total expenditure in financial year 2016–17 estimated to be ₹32,250.39 crore in revenue account and ₹8,171.81 crore capital account.
- ₹11,015.62 crore provision is made towards expenditures on salaries and allowances of the employees, considering the recommendation of the Seventh pay commission.
- Plan expenditure is estimated to be ₹15,931.60 crore approximately.

Deficit

- Total fiscal deficit for year 2016–17 ₹510.20 crore.

== See also ==
- Economy of India
