= Economy of Haryana =

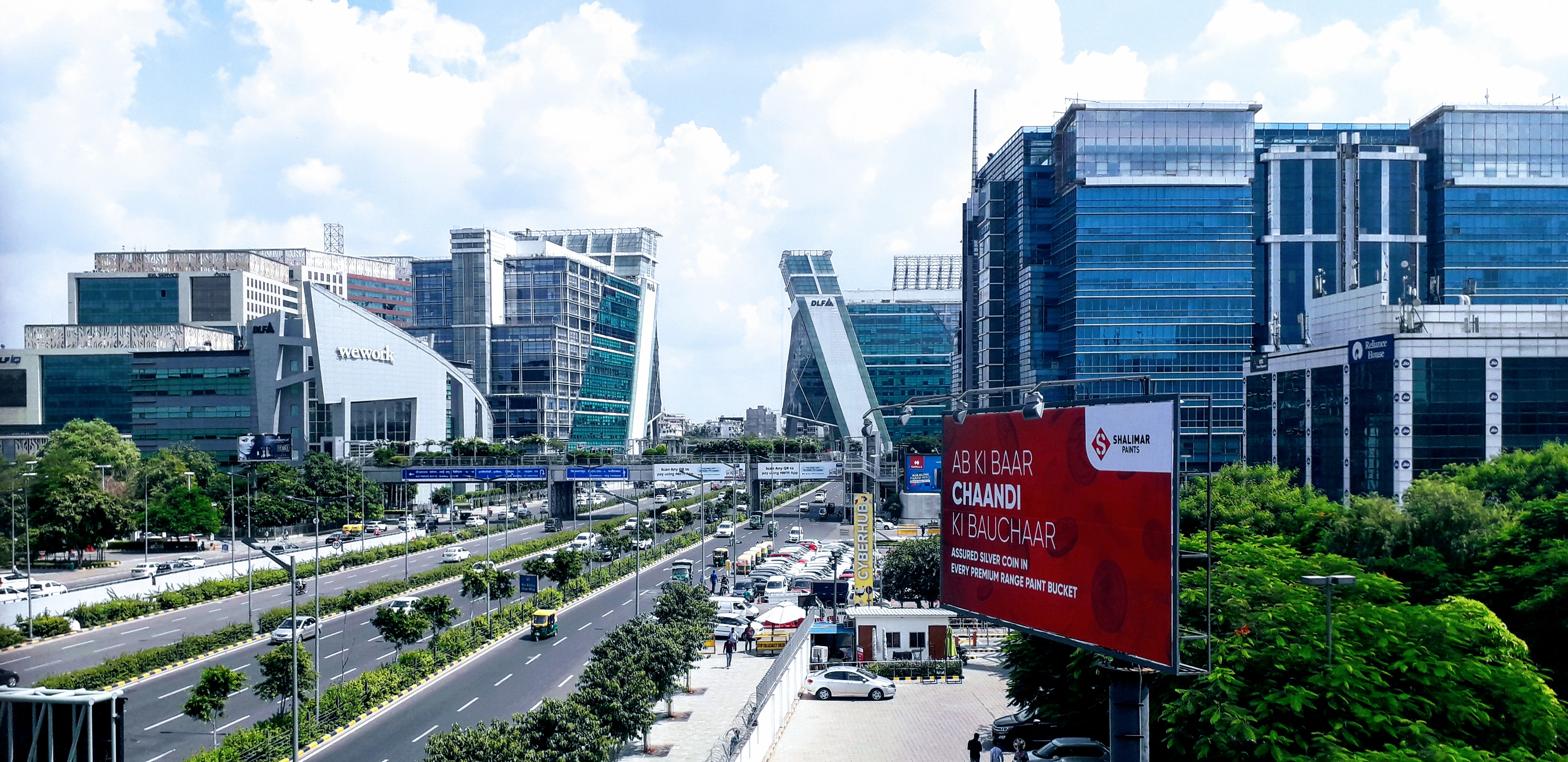
- Gurgaon, the city's DLF Cyber City that houses some of the top IT & Fortune 500 companies.
- Currency: Indian Rupee (INR, ₹)
- Fiscal year: 1 April – 31 March
- Country group: Developing/Emerging; Upper-middle income economy

Statistics
- Population: ▲30,785,000
- GDP: ▲₹15.18 trillion (US$160 billion) (nominal; 2026 est.) ▲$735.6 billion(PPP; 2026 est.)
- GDP rank: 14th
- GDP growth: 11% (2025–26)
- GDP per capita: ▲$5,731 ▲$23,410(PPP; 2026 est.)
- GDP per capita rank: 7th
- GDP by sector: Agriculture: 15.9%; Industry: 32.9%; Services: 51.2% (2024–25 est.)
- Population below national poverty line: ▼11.16% in poverty (2017–18)
- Human Development Index: ▲0.737 high (2023) (16th)
- Unemployment: ▲37.4%

Public finance
- Government debt: 26.2% of GSDP (2024–25 est.)
- Budget balance: ₹−33,635 crore (US$−3.5 billion) (2.8% of GSDP) (2024–25 est.)
- Revenue: ₹1.17 lakh crore (US$12 billion) (2024–25 est.)
- Spending: ₹1.56 lakh crore (US$16 billion) (2024–25 est.)
- All values, unless otherwise stated, are in US dollars.

The Gross State Domestic Product (GSDP) of Haryana for the 2024–25 financial year is estimated at ₹12.16 lakh crore (US$130 billion), representing an 11% growth over the previous year, contributed by the state's contribution of 7% of India's agricultural exports and 60% of India's Basmati rice exports, with 7 operational SEZs and additional 23 formally approved SEZs (20 already notified and 3 in-principle approval, mostly along Delhi Western Peripheral Expressway as well as Amritsar Delhi Kolkata Industrial Corridor and DMIC corridor).

Haryana also produces India's 67% of passenger cars, 60% of motorcycles, 50% of tractors and 50% of the refrigerators, which places Haryana on 14th place on the list of Indian states and union territories by GDP behind only much bigger states that are significantly larger in both area and population.

Even though Haryana has only 1.3% area and 2.1% population of India, it contributes 3.6% of Nation GDP and 7.1% national GST collection, annually exports over US$20 billion, has second highest per capita income among all states of India with 65% population in working age group of 15–65 years, in FY 2025 had 19 out of 119 unicorns and nearly 10,000 registered startups. The smaller but richer state of Haryana is a massive provider of food security, as Haryana & Punjab together provide 70-90% of wheat & 28-44% of rice of India's PDS, which is then redistributed to other net negative food security states such as BIMARU states.

== Cities in Haryana ==
=== Gurgaon ===
Gurgaon, also referred to as Gurugram, is among India's top 3 IT hubs and IT export income earners. It shares its boundary with south Delhi, and is located about 30km south of national capital New Delhi. It is also one of the four major cities of the National Capital Region, and the second largest city in Haryana. It has the third largest capital income in India after Chandigarh and Mumbai. Gurugram is also called the "Millennium City" with its vast array of modern commercial malls, cyber parks, hi-tech offices and plush residential spaces.

The area of Gurugram city is 231 square km and it is divided into 35 municipal wards. Administratively, it comprises three subdivisions: Gurugram South, Gurugram North, Pataudi, five Tehsils - Gurgaon, Sohna, Farrukhnagar, Pataudi and Manesar, and 38 villages.

In the last two decades, Gurugram has become the industrial and financial nerve centre of Haryana. It houses over 250 Fortune 500 companies. Gurugram is famous for its outsourcing and off-shore services that contribute most to its economy. Major industries in Gurugram include IT, ITES, auto manufacturing and pharmaceuticals.

Professionals from across India come to Gurugram in search of jobs in the private sector. People find the city attractive to move to as there are apartments, housing societies, residential colonies and independent homes available at affordable rates. Almost 60 per cent of Haryana’s revenue accrues from Gurugram by way of excise duty, sales tax, stamp duty and registration.

Gurgaon’s population has increased from some 870,539 in census 2001 to 1,514,085 in census 2011, an increase of 74 per cent in the decade in reference. As per official sources, the current population of Gurgaon is estimated to be close to 2.5 million. The population is expected to grow to 4.25 million by 2031, as per Gurugram Master Plan 2031.

Rapid growth has put substantial pressure on city’s resources. Infrastructural bottlenecks including traffic snarls, road congestions, water scarcity and pollution are on the rise.

Moreover, the city is run by multiple authorities with somewhat superimposing roles. Authorities who manage the city include, but are not limited to, Municipal Corporation of Gurugram, Haryana Urban Development Authority, Haryana State Industrial & Infrastructural Development Corporation, Department of Town and Country Planning and the Deputy Commissioner’s Office.

The Gurugram Metropolitan Development Authority (GMDA) has been proposed to be set up for better governance. A draft bill for its establishment was put in public domain in November 2016. The GMDA is proposed to be established in 2017.

== Primary economy sectors ==
=== Agriculture ===
Haryana constitutes 1.5% of India's area, yet contributes 15% of its agricultural produce, which has grown 7 times since the founding of Haryana in 1966. About 86% of the area in the state is arable, and of that 96% is cultivated. About 75% of the area is irrigated, through tubewells and an extensive system of canals.

Haryana contributed significantly to the Green Revolution in India in the 1970s that made the country self-sufficient in food production. The state has also significantly contributed to the field of agricultural education in the country.

Haryana's agriculture GDP contribution to the nation's agricultural GDP is 14.1% and HAU Hisar in Haryana is Asia's largest agricultural university. Maharana Pratap Horticultural University was established in 2016. In 2017-18, out of total 1,350 canal tails, 1343 tails have been fully fed.

=== Dairy farming ===
Dairy farming is an essential part of the rural economy. Haryana has a livestock population of 10 million head. Milk and milk products form an essential part of the local diet. There is a saying "Desaan main des Haryana, jit doodh dahi ka khaana", which means "Best among all the countries in the world is Haryana, where the staple food is milk and yogurt".

Haryana, with 1182 grams of availability of milk per capita per day, is ranked number one in the country compared to the national average of 232 grams.

There is a vast network of milk societies that support the dairy industry. The National Dairy Research Institute at Karnal, and the Central Institute for Research on Buffaloes at Hisar are instrumental in development of new breeds of cattle and propagation of these breeds through embryo transfer technology.

== Secondary economy sectors ==
=== Manufacturing ===
There are numerous manufacturing companies in the region. These include Hindustan National Glass, Maruti Udyog Limited, Escorts Group, Hero MotoCorp, Alcatel, Sony, Whirlpool India, Bharti Telecom, Liberty Shoes and HMT.

In addition, there are more than 80,000 small-scale industrial units in the state which cumulatively bring in a substantial income for the state and its people. For example, Yamunanagar district has a paper mill BILT, ISGEC and India's one of the largest sugar mill - Saraswati Sugar Mills.

Haryana has a large production of cars, motorcycles, tractors, sanitary ware, glass container industry, gas stoves and scientific instruments.

Faridabad is another big industrial part of Haryana. It is home to hundreds of large scale companies like Orient fans (C.K.Birla Group), JCB India Limited, Nirigemes, Agri Machinery Group (Escorts Group), Yamaha Motor India Pvt. Ltd., Whirlpool, ABB, Goodyear Tire and Rubber Company, Knorr Bremse India Pvt. Ltd. There are thousands of medium and small scale units as well, such as Amrit Enterprises, McAma Industries.

== Tertiary economy sectors ==
=== Digital economy ===
By November 2017, the roll out of BharatNet was already completed in Haryana by providing impetus to Make in India and Digital India.

The total exports from district Gurgaon in Information Technology and IT-enabled services industry has touched Rs 18,000 crore at the end of FY'08.

In the year 2006-07, the software export from Gurgaon was Rs 15,000 crore whereas it was Rs 10,700 crore in 2005-06.

== Gross State Domestic Product Trends ==
This table shows the trend in Gross State Domestic Product (GSDP) of Haryana at constant (2011–12) prices in crore rupees.

Year	Gross State Domestic Product (₹ crore)
2011–2012	2,97,538.52
2012–2013	3,20,911.91
2013–2014	3,47,506.61
2014–2015	3,70,534.51
2015–2016	4,13,404.79
2016–2017	4,56,659.35
2017–2018	4,94,068.03
2018–2019	5,31,085.19
2019–2020	5,44,360.00
2020–2021	5,36,252.00
2021–2022	5,88,775.00
2022–2023	6,30,578.00
2023–2024	6,81,024.00

== See also ==
- History of Haryana
- Tourism in Haryana
