= Economy of Arunachal Pradesh =

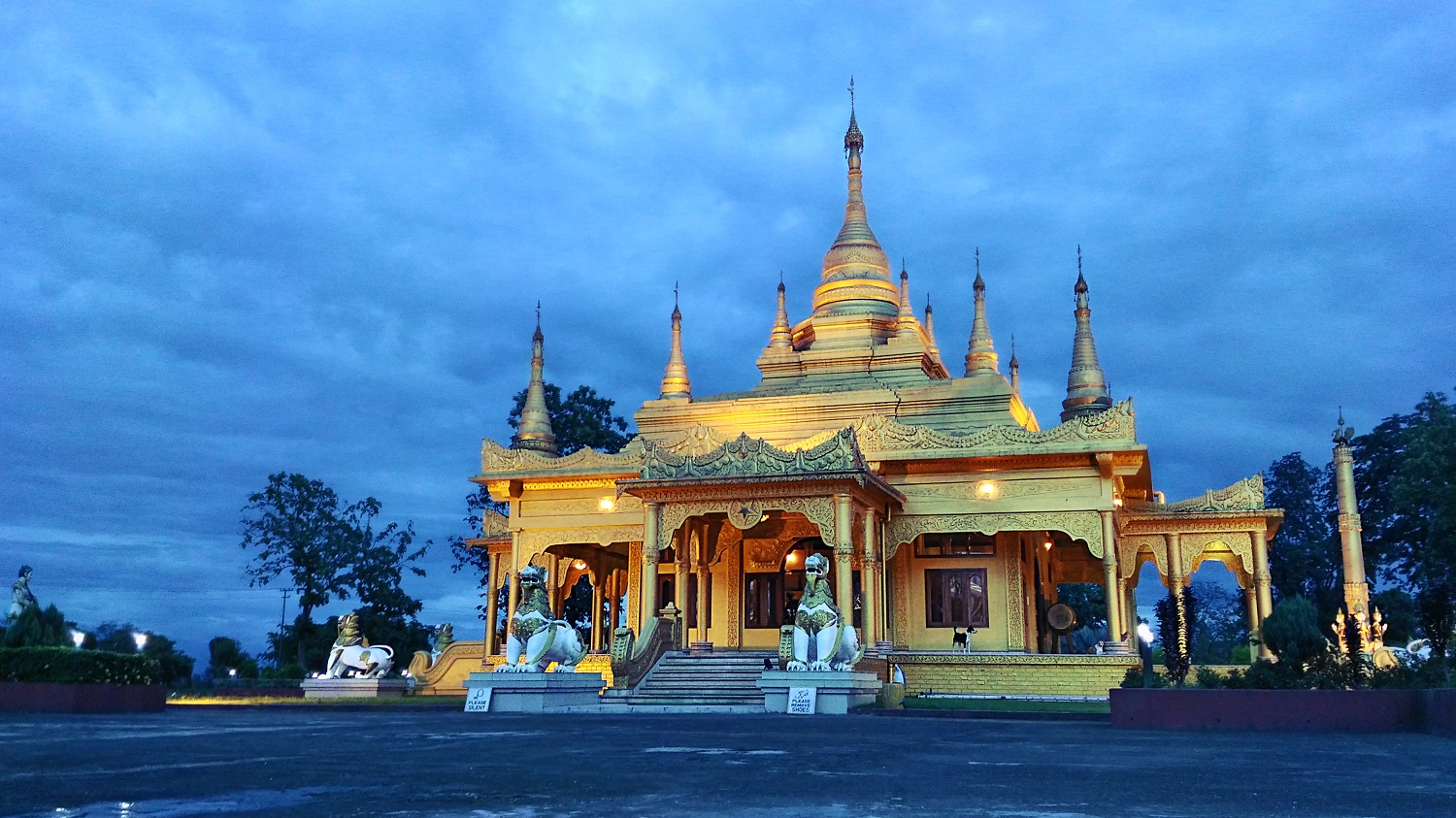
- Golden Pagoda Namsai
- Currency: Indian Rupee (INR, ₹)
- Fiscal year: 1 April - 31 March

Statistics
- GDP: ▲₹0.413 lakh crore (US$4.4 billion) (nominal; 2026-27)
- GDP rank: 31st
- GDP growth: ▲10% (2025-26 est.)
- GDP per capita: ▲₹309,994 (US$3,300)(2026-27)
- GDP per capita rank: 18st
- GDP by sector: Agriculture 27% Industries 21% Services 52%, (2025-26)
- Human Development Index: ▲0.770 (2023) High 34th
- All values, unless otherwise stated, are in US dollars.

The economy of Arunachal Pradesh is primarily agrarian, driven by Jhum cultivation and terrace farming, with a growing focus on hydropower, tourism, and horticulture.
