= Economy of Himachal Pradesh =

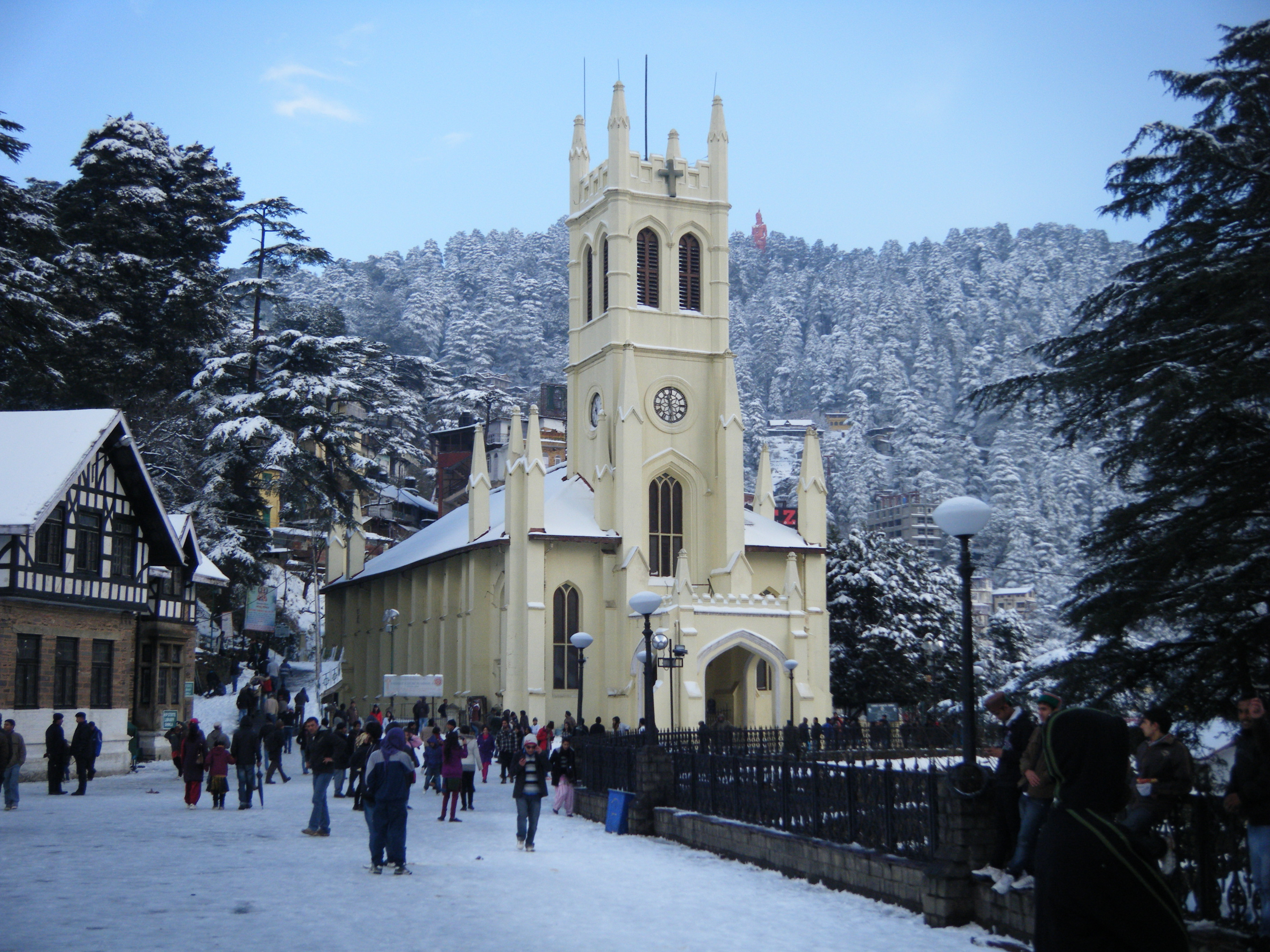
- Shimla - the capital of Himachal Pradesh
- Fiscal year: 1 April – 31 March

Statistics
- Population: ▲7,527,000 (2025)
- GDP: ▲₹2.775 lakh crore (US$29 billion)(nominal; 2026-27 est.)
- GDP rank: 22nd
- GDP growth: ▲10% (FY 2025-26est.)
- GDP per capita: ▲₹2.83 lakh (US$2,900)(2025-26)
- GDP by sector: Agriculture 14% Industry 42% Services 44% (FY 2023-24)
- Inflation (CPI): ▼2.61% (2025)
- Population below national poverty line: ▼3.88% (2023)
- Human Development Index: ▲0.752 high (2023, HDI 9th)
- Unemployment: 1.2% (2018-19)

Public finance
- Government debt: 0.49% of GSDP (2022-23 est.)
- Budget balance: ₹9,096.02 crore (US$940 million); 4.98% of GSDP (2022-23 est.)
- Revenue: ₹36,420 crore (US$3.8 billion) (2022-23 est.)
- Spending: ₹46,023 crore (US$4.8 billion) (2022-23 est.)
- All values, unless otherwise stated, are in US dollars.

The era of economic planning started in Himachal Pradesh in 1948. The first five-year plan allocated about Rs. 52.7 million to Himachal. More than 50% of this expenditure was spent on transport facilities since it was felt that without proper it, the process of planning and development couldn't be carried out.

The community development programme which was launched in 1952 in Himachal, in certain selected areas was later extended to the entire rural Himachal. In Mandi and Kangra, package programmes were undertaken in collaboration with the West Germany to popularising modern techniques of cultivation among the farmers. Suitable agricultural machinery and animal husbandry were introduced in these areas. Well equipped soil testing laboratories, dairy farms and agricultural workshops were set up at various centres, besides an Agriculture University at Palampur.

Himachal is one of those states in India which was rapidly transformed from the most backward part of the country to one of the most advanced states. At present Himachal ranks fourth in respect of per capita income among the states of the Indian Union.

== Agriculture ==
Agriculture contributes nearly about 45% to the net state domestic product. It is the main source of income as well Himachal pradesh is known as Apple state or apple capital of India Theog Rohru Kinnaur Kullu is leading supplies of the major crop grown in himachal Pradesh as employment in Himachal. About 93% of the state population depend directly upon agriculture. The main cereals grown in the state are wheat, maize, rice and barley and apples . Kangra, Mandi and Paonta valley of Sirmaur district (to some extent) are the major producers of the first three cereals, while barley is mostly cultivated in Shimla. Fruit cultivation has also proved to be an economic boon to the state. There are huge tracts of land suitable only for growing fruits. Fruit of all cultivation does not add to the problem of soil erosion and its employment potential is more than the conventional farming. The yield per acre in terms of income is also much higher. Apple produces the maximum income. Fruit growing in the state is fetching over Rs. 3 billion annually. Special efforts are being made to promote cultivation of crops like olives, figs, hops, mushrooms, flowers, pistachio nuts, sarda melon and saffron. The state has also earned the name of the Apple State of India.

== Industry ==
Ecology has been given importance in the state during the last few years. Industries becoming the cause of water or air pollution are not encouraged. Every industrial project has to be passed by the clearance of the Environment Protection Organization before its establishment. Himachal is facing a number of difficulties in the advancement of industries. Lack of means of dependable transport and poor accessibility was one of the major drawbacks. Other problems faced by the state were the poor mineral resources, non-availability of infrastructure and communication facilities, shortage of capital and lack of modern skills. The only advantage of the state was the ample availability of electricity. Parwano, Barotiwala, Baddi, Paonta Sahib, Mehatpur, Shamshi, Nagrota Bagwan, Bilaspur, Reckong Peo and Sansar Pur Terrace are some of the industrial areas of the state at present. As the dust free climate of Himachal is extremely suitable for the setting up of electronic industries, many electronic complexes have been established at Solan, Mandi, Hamirpur, Shoghi, Raga-Ka-Bagh, Chamba, Ambi, Taliwala and Keylong.

Gross State Domestic Product at Current Prices figures in crores of Indian Rupees
Year	Gross State Domestic Product
1980	7,940
1985	13,720
1990	28,150
1995	66,980
2000	135,900
