= List of Indian states and union territories by GDP =

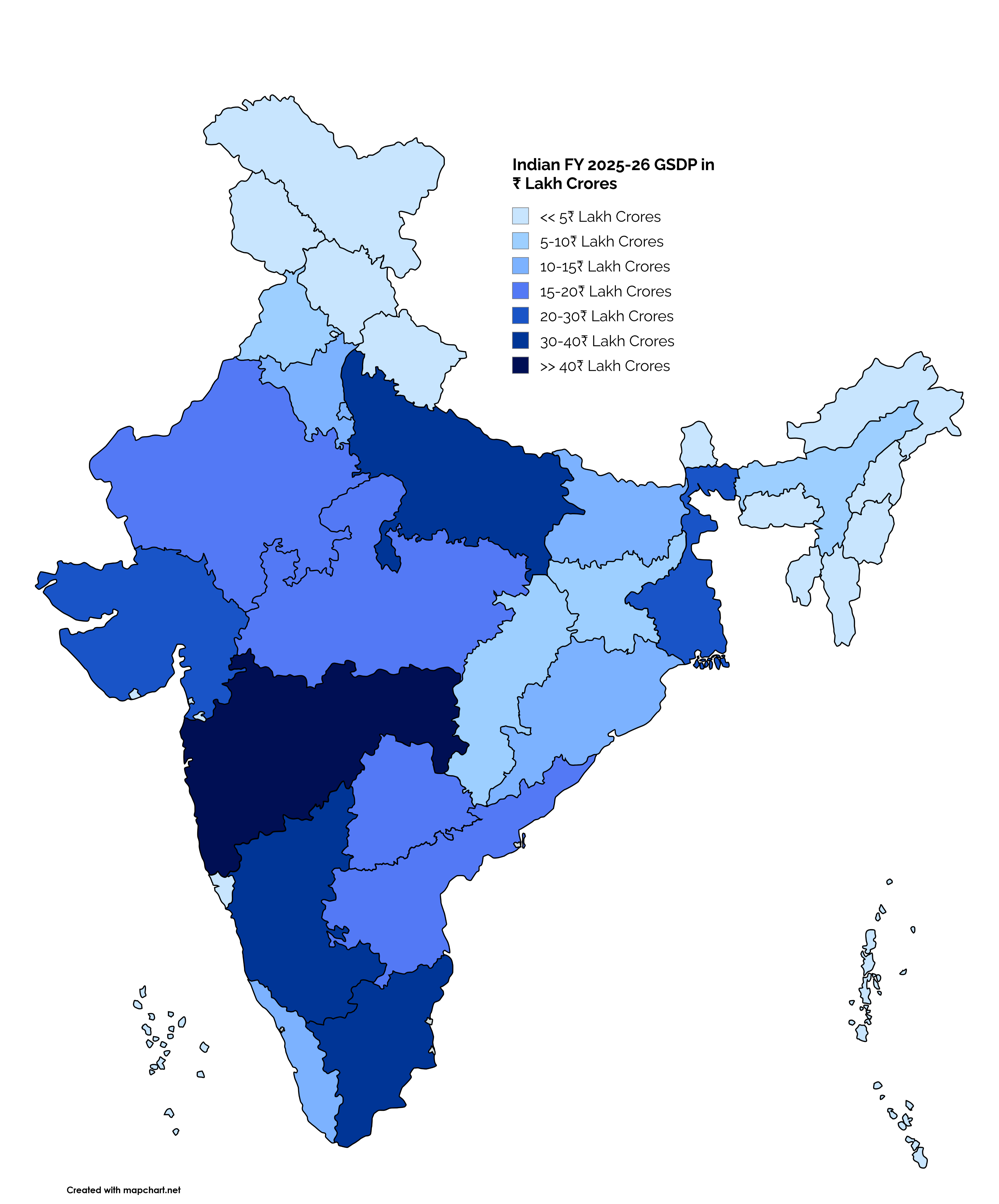
Indian FY 2025-26 GSDP in ₹ Lakh Crores

These are lists of Indian states and union territories by their nominal gross state domestic product (GSDP). GSDP is the sum of all value added by industries within each state or union territory and serves as a counterpart to the national gross domestic product (GDP). As of 2011, the Government accounted for about 21% of the GDP followed by agriculture with 21% and corporate sector at 12%. The remaining 48% is sourced from small proprietorship and partnership companies, unorganized sector and households.

== List ==
List of Indian states and union territories by GDP 2025 The average exchange rate in 2025 was 1 USD to 88.48 INR.
	State/Union Territory	GDP (in lakh crore)	GDP (in billions)	Nominal growth (%)
1	Maharashtra	₹4,939,355	$558.24	▲9.0%
2	Tamil Nadu	₹3,567,818	$403.23	▲15.0%
3	Uttar Pradesh	₹3,080,000	$348.10	▲12.0%
4	Karnataka	₹3,070,103	$346.98	▲7.0%
5	Gujarat	₹2,982,032	$337.03	▲12.0%
6	West Bengal	₹2,031,805	$229.63	▲12.0%
7	Rajasthan	₹1,989,000	$224.80	▲16.7%
8	Andhra Pradesh	₹1,836,278	$207.53	▲14.3%
9	Telangana	₹1,800,325	$203.47	▲12.0%
10	Madhya Pradesh	₹1,694,477	$191.51	▲13%
11	Kerala	₹1,427,145	$161.29	▲12.0%
12	Haryana	₹1,347,486	$152.30	▲11.0%
13	Delhi	₹1,327,055	$149.98	▲9.4%
14	Bihar	₹1,097,264	$124.01	▲22.0%
15	Odisha	₹988,421	$111.71	▲12.0%
16	Punjab	₹891,301	$100.73	▲10.0%
17	Assam	₹741,626	$83.82	▲15.0%
18	Chhattisgarh	₹635,918	$71.87	▲12.0%
19	Jharkhand	₹556,286	$62.87	▲10.0%
20	Uttarakhand	₹429,308	$48.52	▲13.0%
21	Jammu and Kashmir	₹288,422	$32.60	▲10.0%
22	Himachal Pradesh	₹255,636	$28.89	▲10.0%
23	Goa	₹138,624	$15.67	▲14.0%
24	Tripura	₹100,795	$11.39	▲12.0%
25	Chandigarh	₹68,400	$7.73	N/A
26	Meghalaya	₹66,645	$7.53	▲13.0%
27	Sikkim	₹57,000	$6.44	▲8.0%
28	Puducherry	₹51,785	$5.85	▲10.0%
29	Manipur	₹54,680	$6.18	▲10.0%
30	Arunachal Pradesh	₹47,823	$5.40	▲8.0%
31	Nagaland	₹45,020	$5.09	▲12.0%
32	Mizoram	₹36,089	$4.08	▲6.0%
33	Andaman and Nicobar Islands	₹12,400	$1.40	N/A

== Historical data ==
GSDP at current prices (in ₹ billions)
State/Union Territory	2011–12	2012–13	2013–14	2014–15	2015–16	2016–17	2017–18	2018–19	2019–20	2020–21	2021–22	2022–23
Andaman and Nicobar Islands *	40	44	50	55	60	68	79	90	98	93	104	117
Andhra Pradesh *	3,794	4,114	4,643	5,250	6,042	6,844	7,861	8,737	9,258	9,786	11,485	13,035
Arunachal Pradesh *	111	125	146	180	185	199	225	253	300	305	327	351
Assam *	1,432	1,569	1,777	1,957	2,280	2,544	2,832	3,093	3,469	3,398	4,107	4,788
Bihar *	2,471	2,824	3,171	3,430	3,716	4,211	4,687	5,280	5,819	5,678	6,474	7,464
Chandigarh *	188	216	248	265	293	324	363	401	434	394	461	550
Chhattisgarh *	1,581	1,775	2,068	2,211	2,252	2,628	2,827	3,271	3,447	3,523	4,105	4,644
Delhi *	3,438	3,914	4,440	4,948	5,508	6,161	6,779	7,384	7,929	7,443	8,813	10,147
Goa *	424	381	359	478	551	630	694	719	750	742	812	891
Gujarat *	6,156	7,245	8,076	9,218	10,290	11,672	13,291	14,922	16,171	16,161	19,209	22,034
Haryana *	2,975	3,470	3,993	4,371	4,955	5,614	6,388	6,989	7,381	7,291	8,689	9,841
Himachal Pradesh *	727	828	948	1,038	1,142	1,256	1,386	1,484	1,592	1,516	1,722	1,917
Jammu and Kashmir *	783	871	956	984	1,172	1,248	1,397	1,599	1,641	1,678	1,886	2,202
Jharkhand *	1,509	1,747	1,886	2,185	2,066	2,362	2,698	3,057	3,103	2,967	3,761	4,174
Karnataka *	6,060	6,954	8,167	9,139	10,452	12,076	13,332	14,794	16,158	16,415	19,781	22,700
Kerala *	3,640	4,123	4,650	5,126	5,620	6,349	7,016	7,883	8,129	7,717	9,245	10,236
Madhya Pradesh *	3,156	3,809	4,395	4,799	5,411	6,498	7,263	8,298	9,279	9,466	10,930	12,465
Maharashtra *	12,804	14,596	16,496	17,791	19,662	21,982	23,528	25,289	26,568	26,107	31,441	36,459
Manipur *	129	137	162	181	195	213	258	274	298	298	350	402
Meghalaya *	199	219	229	232	251	274	295	322	348	338	402	466
Mizoram *	73	84	103	135	151	172	194	219	250	239	267	307
Nagaland *	122	141	166	184	195	217	244	265	297	298	323	372
Odisha *	2,310	2,617	2,965	3,142	3,285	3,928	4,404	4,986	5,375	5,402	6,970	7,596
Puducherry *	168	189	219	226	266	296	321	342	370	362	409	447
Punjab *	2,666	2,977	3,321	3,551	3,901	4,270	4,710	5,125	5,370	5,409	6,277	6,813
Rajasthan *	4,348	4,936	5,510	6,156	6,815	7,606	8,325	9,115	10,000	10,179	11,950	13,579
Sikkim *	112	123	139	154	180	207	260	284	314	330	376	427
Tamil Nadu *	7,515	8,548	9,685	10,727	11,765	13,026	14,651	16,302	17,431	17,881	20,725	23,934
Telangana *	3,594	4,016	4,516	5,058	5,779	6,583	7,501	8,574	9,501	9,431	11,241	13,118
Tripura *	192	217	256	295	359	395	437	498	542	535	623	723
Uttar Pradesh *	7,241	8,224	9,404	10,118	11,378	12,887	14,399	15,822	17,001	16,449	19,756	22,580
Uttarakhand *	1,153	1,316	1,491	1,614	1,772	1,951	2,202	2,303	2,393	2,256	2,671	3,038
West Bengal *	5,205	5,915	6,768	7,181	7,973	8,725	9,747	11,021	11,791	11,418	13,292	15,318

Growth rate (%)
State/Union Territory	2012–13	2013–14	2014–15	2015–16	2016–17	2017–18	2018–19	2019–20	2020–21	2021–22	2022–23
Andaman and Nicobar Islands *	▲11.13	▲13.6	▲9.05	▲10.12	▲13.33	▲15.43	▲14.1	▲8.46	▼-4.66	▲11.62	▲12.29
Andhra Pradesh *	▲8.43	▲12.85	▲13.08	▲15.1	▲13.27	▲14.86	▲11.14	▲5.97	▲5.7	▲17.36	▲13.5
Arunachal Pradesh *	▲13.41	▲16.22	▲23.17	▲3.06	▲7.53	▲12.93	▲12.73	▲18.51	▲1.67	▲7.14	▲7.34
Assam *	▲9.56	▲13.31	▲10.11	▲16.47	▲11.59	▲11.31	▲9.24	▲12.13	▼-2.03	▲20.87	▲16.57
Bihar *	▲14.25	▲12.3	▲8.15	▲8.35	▲13.31	▲11.33	▲12.64	▲10.2	▼-2.41	▲14.02	▲15.3
Chandigarh *	▲15.13	▲14.87	▲6.96	▲10.27	▲10.77	▲12.08	▲10.44	▲8.18	▼-9.23	▲16.84	▲19.41
Chhattisgarh *	▲12.3	▲16.52	▲6.91	▲1.83	▲16.72	▲7.59	▲15.69	▲5.37	▲2.22	▲16.52	▲13.12
Delhi *	▲13.84	▲13.43	▲11.45	▲11.32	▲11.85	▲10.03	▲8.92	▲7.38	▼-6.13	▲18.41	▲15.13
Goa *	▼-10.02	▼-5.77	▲33.11	▲15.14	▲14.39	▲10.12	▲3.61	▲4.42	▼-1.17	▲9.53	▲9.73
Gujarat *	▲17.69	▲11.47	▲14.13	▲11.63	▲13.43	▲13.87	▲12.27	▲8.38	▼-0.06	▲18.86	▲14.71
Haryana *	▲16.63	▲15.05	▲9.49	▲13.35	▲13.3	▲13.79	▲9.41	▲5.6	▼-1.22	▲19.18	▲13.25
Himachal Pradesh *	▲13.89	▲14.42	▲9.51	▲10.09	▲9.97	▲10.28	▲7.1	▲7.27	▼-4.75	▲13.56	▲11.36
Jammu and Kashmir *	▲11.35	▲9.74	▲2.87	▲19.11	▲6.55	▲11.9	▲14.42	▲2.65	▲2.25	▲12.38	▲16.78
Jharkhand *	▲15.77	▲7.92	▲15.89	▼-5.45	▲14.34	▲14.21	▲13.3	▲1.51	▼-4.4	▲26.79	▲10.96
Karnataka *	▲14.75	▲17.44	▲11.91	▲14.36	▲15.54	▲10.4	▲10.96	▲9.22	▲1.59	▲20.51	▲14.76
Kerala *	▲13.26	▲12.79	▲10.22	▲9.64	▲12.97	▲10.51	▲12.36	▲3.13	▼-5.07	▲19.79	▲10.72
Madhya Pradesh *	▲20.71	▲15.37	▲9.21	▲12.74	▲20.1	▲11.77	▲14.25	▲11.82	▲2.02	▲15.46	▲14.05
Maharashtra *	▲14	▲13.02	▲7.85	▲10.52	▲11.8	▲7.03	▲7.48	▲5.06	▼-1.74	▲20.44	▲15.96
Manipur *	▲6.42	▲17.75	▲12.03	▲7.73	▲9.03	▲21.11	▲6.2	▲8.85	▼-0.12	▲17.64	▲14.89
Meghalaya *	▲9.81	▲4.87	▲1.29	▲8.1	▲9.24	▲7.54	▲9.04	▲8.06	▼-2.86	▲19.08	▲15.74
Mizoram *	▲15.2	▲23.1	▲31.24	▲12.06	▲13.56	▲12.76	▲13.03	▲14.04	▼-4.27	▲11.59	▲14.97
Nagaland *	▲15.97	▲17.64	▲10.77	▲6.1	▲11.26	▲12.29	▲8.75	▲12.02	▲0.39	▲8.16	▲15.14
Odisha *	▲13.3	▲13.29	▲6	▲4.55	▲19.56	▲12.12	▲13.22	▲7.8	▲0.5	▲29.03	▲8.97
Puducherry *	▲12.23	▲15.87	▲3.22	▲17.91	▲11.11	▲8.64	▲6.36	▲8.28	▼-2.21	▲13.06	▲9.28
Punjab *	▲11.67	▲11.56	▲6.91	▲9.85	▲9.46	▲10.31	▲8.81	▲4.78	▲0.71	▲16.06	▲8.53
Rajasthan *	▲13.5	▲11.65	▲11.73	▲10.69	▲11.61	▲9.46	▲9.49	▲9.71	▲1.79	▲17.39	▲13.63
Sikkim *	▲10.51	▲12.35	▲11.14	▲17.05	▲14.71	▲25.54	▲9.36	▲10.7	▲5.02	▲14.03	▲13.35
Tamil Nadu *	▲13.75	▲13.3	▲10.75	▲9.68	▲10.72	▲12.47	▲11.27	▲6.93	▲2.58	▲15.91	▲15.48
Telangana *	▲11.73	▲12.45	▲12.02	▲14.24	▲13.92	▲13.93	▲14.32	▲10.81	▼-0.74	▲19.19	▲16.7
Tripura *	▲12.78	▲18.14	▲15.4	▲21.68	▲9.86	▲10.73	▲13.97	▲8.69	▼-1.19	▲16.44	▲16.12
Uttar Pradesh *	▲13.58	▲14.34	▲7.6	▲12.45	▲13.26	▲11.73	▲9.88	▲7.45	▼-3.24	▲20.1	▲14.3
Uttarakhand *	▲14.12	▲13.27	▲8.29	▲9.74	▲10.14	▲12.86	▲4.59	▲3.88	▼-5.7	▲18.41	▲13.71
West Bengal *	▲13.64	▲14.44	▲6.09	▲11.03	▲9.44	▲11.71	▲13.07	▲6.99	▼-3.17	▲16.42	▲15.24

== GDP (PPP) ==
GDP (PPP) was calculated based on projected GDP from state budgets that was converted to international dollars using the IMF's implied PPP conversion rate for India..

Indian States by GDP (Purchasing power parity)
Rank	State/Union territory	2026-27 in (billion USD)
1	Maharashtra	$2,701.59
2	Tamil Nadu	$2,031.62
3	Uttar Pradesh	$1,988.01
4	Gujarat	$1,660.68
5	Karnataka	$1,651.09
6	Rajasthan	$1,074.97
7	West Bengal	$1,073.05
8	Andhra Pradesh	$986.54
9	Telangana	$979.87
10	Madhya Pradesh	$923.21
11	Kerala	$813.72
12	Haryana	$758.35
13	Bihar	$654.34
14	Delhi	$662.86
15	Odisha	$552.94
16	Punjab	$489.82
17	Assam	$435.29
18	Chhattisgarh	$354.42
19	Jharkhand	$312.12
20	Uttarakhand	$213.64
21	Jammu and Kashmir	$157.75
22	Himachal Pradesh	$138.60
23	Goa	$65.43
24	Tripura	$50.35
25	Meghalaya	$38.12
26	Chandigarh	$36.91
27	Puducherry	$30.70
28	Sikkim	$31.45
29	Manipur	$34.38
30	Nagaland	$24.22
31	Mizoram	$21.89
32	Arunachal Pradesh	$20.65
33	Andaman and Nicobar Islands	$6.69
-	India	$19,192.62

== See also ==
- List of Indian metropolitan areas by GDP
- Economy of India
- Foreign-exchange reserves of India
- Income in India
- List of country subdivisions by GDP over 200 billion US dollars
- List of countries by GDP (nominal)
- Standard of living in India
