= List of Indian states and union territories by GDP per capita =

Indian states and union territories by NSDP (Net state domestic product) per capita

This is a list of Indian states and union territories by their per capita net state domestic product (NSDP). NSDP is the state counterpart to a country's net domestic product (NDP), which equals the gross domestic product (GDP) minus depreciation on capital goods.

== List ==
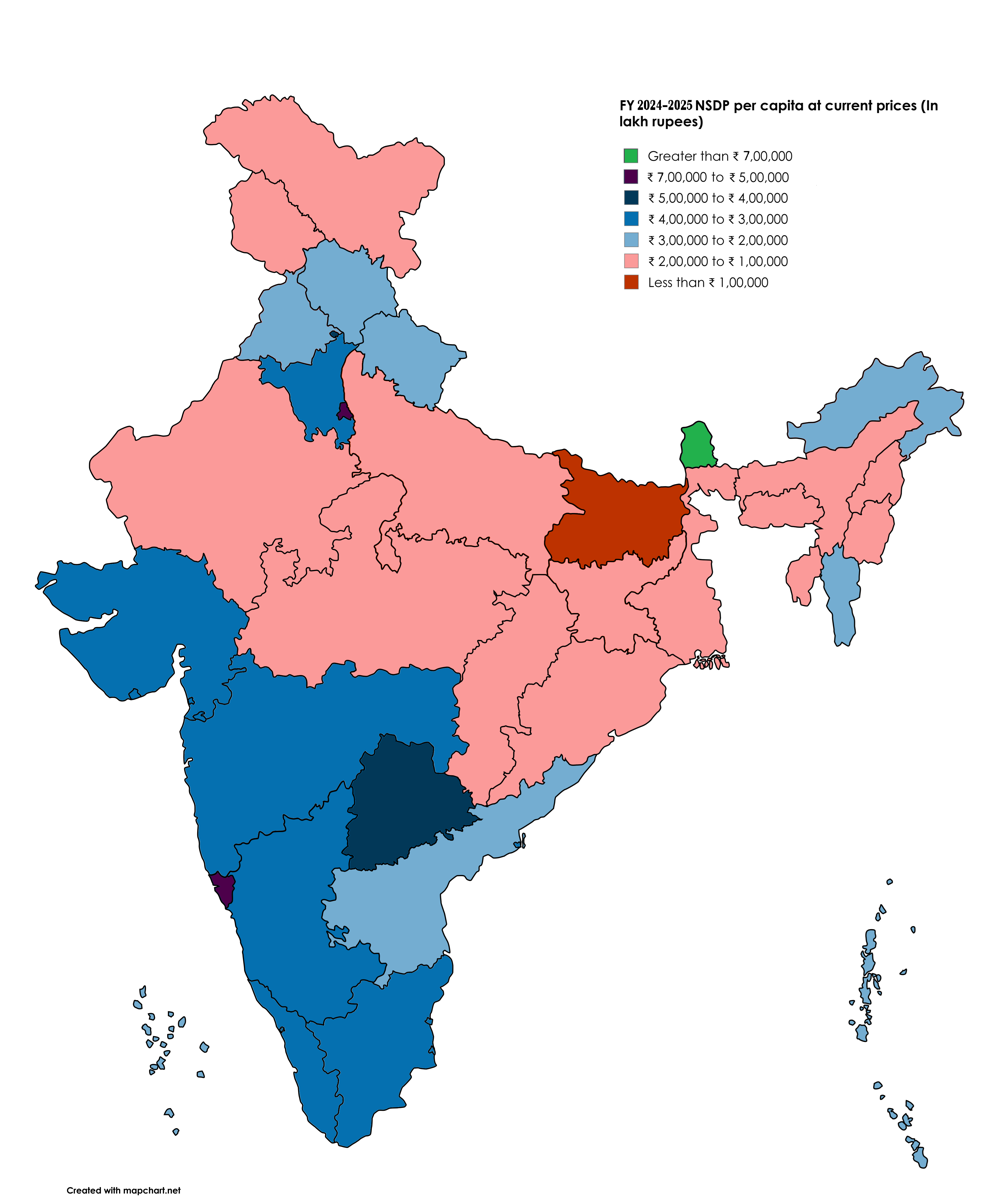
FY 2024–25 NSDP per capita at current prices

GSDP per capita at current prices (₹ and $)
Rank	State/Union territory	2025–26 (₹)	2025–26 ($)	2024–25 (₹)	2024–25 ($)
1	Sikkim	₹857,560	$9,125	₹763,749	$8,428
2	Goa	NA	NA	₹709,045	$7,825
3	Delhi	₹593,071	$6,310	₹552,727	$6,100
4	Chandigarh	NA	NA	₹494,115	$5,453
5	Telangana	₹509,545	$5,438	₹427,730	$4,721
6	Karnataka	₹477,033	$5,076	₹421,858	$4,656
7	Tamil Nadu	₹455,650	$4,849	₹403,847	$4,457
8	Haryana	₹441,216	$4,695	₹394,333	$4,352
9	Gujarat	₹405,718	$4,317	₹371,016	$4,095
10	Maharashtra	₹394,477	$4,197	₹354,225	$3,909
11	Kerala	NA	NA	₹346,436	$3,823
12	Himachal Pradesh	₹340,848	$3,627	₹307,812	$3,397
13	Andhra Pradesh	₹327,509	$3,485	₹298,058	$3,289
14	Puducherry	₹323,561	$3,443	₹306,120	$3,378
15	Uttarakhand	NA	NA	₹296,012	$3,265
16	Mizoram	NA	NA	₹287,097	$3,168
17	Arunachal Pradesh	₹309,994	$3,298	₹279,396	$3,085
18	Punjab	₹279,398	$2,973	₹253,317	$2,796
	India	₹251,393	$2,675	₹234,859	$2,592
19	Tripura	₹239,988	$2,554	₹213,377	$2,354
20	Rajasthan	₹225,200	$2,396	₹206,822	$2,282
21	Odisha	₹210,186	$2,236	₹190,439	$2,102
22	Jammu and Kashmir	₹206,189	$2,194	₹190,767	$2,105
23	Assam	₹203,760	$2,168	₹177,602	$1,960
24	Chhattisgarh	₹203,196	$2,162	₹184,837	$2,039
25	West Bengal	₹198,451	$2,111	₹181,786	$2,006
26	Nagaland	₹192,282	$2,046	₹175,616	$1,938
27	Madhya Pradesh	₹191,839	$2,041	₹170,430	$1,881
28	Meghalaya	₹190,414	$2,026	₹174,090	$1,921
29	Manipur	₹180,787	$1,924	₹153,993	$1,699
30	Uttar Pradesh	₹146,938	$1,563	₹124,366	$1,372
31	Jharkhand	₹138,271	$1,471	₹128,253	$1,415
32	Bihar	₹84,925	$904	₹76,490	$844

== Historical Data ==
NSDP per capita at current prices (₹)
Rank (Note: Ranking is based on 2022-23 data as not all 2023-24 data available yet)	State/Union Territory	2011-12	2012-13	2013-14	2014-15	2015-16	2016-17	2017-18	2018-19	2019-20	2020-21	2021-22	2022-23	2023-24	2024-25
10	Andaman & Nicobar Islands	89,100	98,777	1,11,087	1,26,344	1,37,064	1,53,904	1,78,709	2,04,254	2,19,653	2,05,368	2,29,570	2,63,984	2,76,000	-
14	Andhra Pradesh	69,000	74,687	82,870	93,903	1,08,002	1,20,676	1,38,299	1,54,031	1,60,341	1,68,063	1,93,703	2,19,917	2,37,951	2,66,240
18	Arunachal Pradesh	73,540	82,626	94,135	1,14,789	1,16,985	1,24,129	1,38,836	1,55,103	1,82,171	1,81,537	1,90,851	2,04,469	2,17,325	2,46,813
30	Assam	41,142	44,599	49,734	52,895	60,817	66,330	75,151	81,034	90,123	86,947	1,03,371	1,21,573	1,43,852	1,59,185
34	Bihar	21,750	24,487	26,948	28,671	30,404	34,045	36,850	40,715	44,175	42,128	47,296	54,637	62,201	69,321
4	Chandigarh	1,58,967	1,80,457	2,03,356	2,12,594	2,30,009	2,52,236	2,80,512	3,07,812	3,30,703	2,90,417	3,37,406	4,08,512	4,53,457	-
25	Chhattisgarh	55,177	60,849	69,880	72,936	72,991	83,285	88,793	1,02,024	1,06,611	1,06,117	1,23,493	1,34,996	1,48,922	1,62,870
3	Delhi	1,85,001	2,05,568	2,27,900	2,47,209	2,70,261	2,95,558	3,18,323	3,38,730	3,55,798	3,22,311	3,70,824	4,17,217	4,59,408	4,93,024
1	Goa	2,59,444	2,34,354	2,15,776	2,89,185	3,34,576	3,78,953	4,11,740	4,23,716	4,35,949	4,23,047	4,59,094	5,32,854	5,85,953	-
9	Gujarat	87,481	1,02,826	1,13,139	1,27,017	1,39,254	1,56,295	1,76,961	1,97,457	2,12,428	2,07,324	2,41,584	2,72,451	-	-
7	Haryana	1,06,085	1,21,269	1,37,770	1,47,382	1,64,963	1,84,982	2,08,437	2,23,022	2,32,530	2,25,137	2,65,163	2,89,213	3,19,363	3,53,182
16	Himachal Pradesh	87,721	99,730	1,14,095	1,23,299	1,35,512	1,50,290	1,65,497	1,74,804	1,86,559	1,73,565	1,93,016	2,14,952	2,34,721	2,56,137
29	Jammu & Kashmir*	51,775	57,279	61,907	62,327	74,950	78,960	87,710	98,738	1,01,868	1,01,645	1,12,898	1,23,614	1,40,051	1,54,826
32	Jharkhand	41,254	47,360	50,006	57,301	52,754	60,018	67,484	75,421	75,016	69,963	88,500	95,839	1,06,529	1,16,663
6	Karnataka	90,263	1,02,319	1,18,829	1,30,024	1,48,108	1,69,898	1,85,840	2,05,245	2,22,141	2,21,683	2,68,963	3,10,325	3,39,813	3,80,906
11	Kerala	97,912	1,10,314	1,23,388	1,35,537	1,48,133	1,66,246	1,83,252	2,05,437	2,08,879	1,94,432	2,30,280	2,57,307	2,81,269	3,08,338
19	Ladakh	-	-	-	-	-	-	-	-	-	-	-	1,86,970	2,42,360	-
27	Madhya Pradesh	38,497	44,773	51,849	55,678	62,080	74,324	81,966	92,337	1,01,909	1,01,958	1,17,402	1,27,947	1,39,713	1,52,615
12	Maharashtra	99,597	1,12,092	1,25,261	1,32,836	1,46,815	1,63,726	1,72,663	1,82,865	1,89,843	1,82,454	2,19,620	2,52,289	2,78,681	3,09,340
31	Manipur	39,762	41,230	47,798	52,717	55,447	59,345	71,507	73,795	78,574	75,784	98,826	1,07,133	1,19,938	-
28	Meghalaya	59,794	64,477	66,281	66,485	71,594	77,585	82,457	88,954	95,422	90,751	1,07,971	1,24,673	1,41,195	1,57,141
17	Mizoram	57,654	65,013	77,584	1,03,049	1,14,055	1,27,107	1,55,222	1,64,708	1,95,365	1,73,521	1,90,965	2,13,665	2,34,996	-
23	Nagaland	53,010	61,225	71,510	78,367	82,466	91,347	1,02,003	1,09,198	1,22,759	1,19,781	1,27,225	1,38,889	1,54,828	-
26	Odisha	48,387	54,762	60,687	63,345	64,835	77,507	87,055	98,005	1,04,633	1,03,211	1,33,768	1,34,612	1,50,414	1,68,966
13	Puducherry	1,19,649	1,30,548	1,48,147	1,46,921	1,72,727	1,87,356	1,98,357	2,04,140	2,17,937	2,08,862	2,31,557	2,31,231	2,52,164	2,81,478
20	Punjab	85,577	94,318	1,03,831	1,08,970	1,18,858	1,28,780	1,39,835	1,49,974	1,54,385	1,50,620	1,70,276	1,85,802	2,05,374	2,21,197
22	Rajasthan	57,192	63,658	69,480	76,429	83,426	91,924	98,698	1,06,604	1,15,534	1,14,925	1,34,143	1,50,020	1,66,647	1,85,053
2	Sikkim	1,58,667	1,74,183	1,94,624	2,14,148	2,45,987	2,80,729	3,49,163	3,75,773	4,12,627	4,15,045	4,66,518	5,20,466	5,87,743	-
8	Tamil Nadu	93,112	1,05,340	1,16,960	1,29,494	1,42,028	1,56,595	1,75,276	1,94,373	2,06,165	2,09,628	2,42,339	2,75,272	3,13,329	3,61,619
5	Telangana	91,121	1,01,007	1,12,162	1,24,104	1,40,840	1,59,395	1,79,358	2,09,848	2,31,326	2,25,734	2,69,000	3,12,046	3,47,714	3,87,623
21	Tripura	47,155	52,574	61,815	69,857	84,267	91,596	1,00,444	1,13,016	1,21,456	1,18,401	1,37,032	1,53,584	1,72,299	1,92,842
33	Uttar Pradesh	32,648	36,571	41,137	43,458	48,725	54,564	59,595	64,113	67,639	63,464	76,063	84,640	97,364	1,08,572
15	Uttarakhand	1,00,314	1,13,654	1,26,356	1,36,099	1,47,936	1,61,752	1,80,857	1,86,207	1,90,558	1,74,526	1,94,670	2,19,850	2,46,178	2,74,064
24	West Bengal	51,543	58,195	65,932	68,876	75,992	82,291	91,401	1,03,920	1,10,316	1,05,108	1,22,883	1,37,909	1,49,515	1,63,467

== GDP (PPP) Per Capita ==
GDP (PPP) per Capita was calculated based on projected GDP from state budgets that was converted to international dollars using the IMF's implied PPP conversion rate for India divided by population estimates for each state in 2026..

Indian States by GDP per capita (Purchasing power parity)
Rank	State/Union territory	2026-27 in (int$)
1	Sikkim	$44,358
2	Goa	$40,868
3	Delhi	$29,234
4	Chandigarh	$29,063
5	Tamil Nadu	$26,187
6	Telangana	$25,342
7	Haryana	$24,144
8	Karnataka	$23,909
9	Kerala	$22,454
10	Gujarat	$22,338
11	Maharashtra	$20,848
12	Andhra Pradesh	$18,358
13	Himachal Pradesh	$18,265
14	Uttarakhand	$17,762
15	Puducherry	$17,335
16	Mizoram	$16,896
17	Andaman and Nicobar Islands	$16,478
18	Punjab	$15,614
-	India	$12,998
19	Arunachal Pradesh	$12,842
20	Rajasthan	$12,815
21	Assam	$11,824
22	Tripura	$11,797
23	Odisha	$11,709
24	Jammu and Kashmir	$11,327
25	Chhattisgarh	$11,319
26	Meghalaya	$11,054
27	West Bengal	$10,663
28	Nagaland	$10,535
29	Manipur	$10,362
30	Madhya Pradesh	$10,262
31	Uttar Pradesh	$8,165
32	Jharkhand	$7,593
33	Bihar	$4,925

== See also ==
- Economy of India
