= Outline of Rajasthan =

State of India

Location of Rajasthan

The following outline is provided as an overview of and topical guide to Rajasthan:

Rajasthan largest state of the Republic of India by area, is located in the northwest of India. It comprises most of the area of the large, inhospitable Thar Desert, also known as the Great Indian Desert, which parallels the Sutlej-Indus river valley along its border with Pakistan to the west. Rajasthan is also bordered by Gujarat to the southwest, Madhya Pradesh to the southeast, Uttar Pradesh and Haryana to the northeast and Punjab to the north. Rajasthan covers 10.4% of India, an area of 342,239 square kilometres (132,139 sq mi).

== General reference ==
=== Names ===
- Common English country name(s): Rajasthan
  - Pronunciation
    - English: /ˈrɑːdʒəstæn/
    - Hindustani: [raːdʒəsˈt̪ʰaːn]
- Official name: State of Rajasthan
- Nickname(s): the land of kings
- Adjectival(s): Rajasthani
- Demonym(s): Rajasthanis
- Abbreviations and name codes
  - ISO 3166-2 code: IN-RJ
  - Vehicle registration code: RJ

=== Rankings (amongst India's states) ===
- by population: 7th most populous state
- by area (2011 census): 1st (largest state of India)
- by crime rate (2015): 6th
- by gross domestic product (GDP) (2104): 7th
- by Human Development Index (HDI):
- by life expectancy at birth:
- by literacy rate: 25th

== Geography of Rajasthan ==
- Rajasthan is: a state of India
- Population of Rajasthan: 68,621,012 (as of 2011)
- Area of Rajasthan: 342,239 km^{2} (132,139 sq mi)
- Atlas of Rajasthan

=== Location of Rajasthan ===
Location of Rajasthan within India.

Rajasthan is situated within the following regions:

- Eastern Hemisphere
- Northern Hemisphere
  - Eurasia
    - Asia
      - South Asia
        - Greater India
          - Indian subcontinent
            - India
              - Northern India
- Time zone: Indian Standard Time (UTC+05:30)

=== Environment of Rajasthan ===
- Climate of Rajasthan
  - Western Rajasthan: Sub-tropical arid (desert) climate
  - Rajasthan east of the Aravalli range: Sub-tropical humid (wet) with dry winters
- Wildlife of Rajasthan

==== Natural geographic features of Rajasthan ====
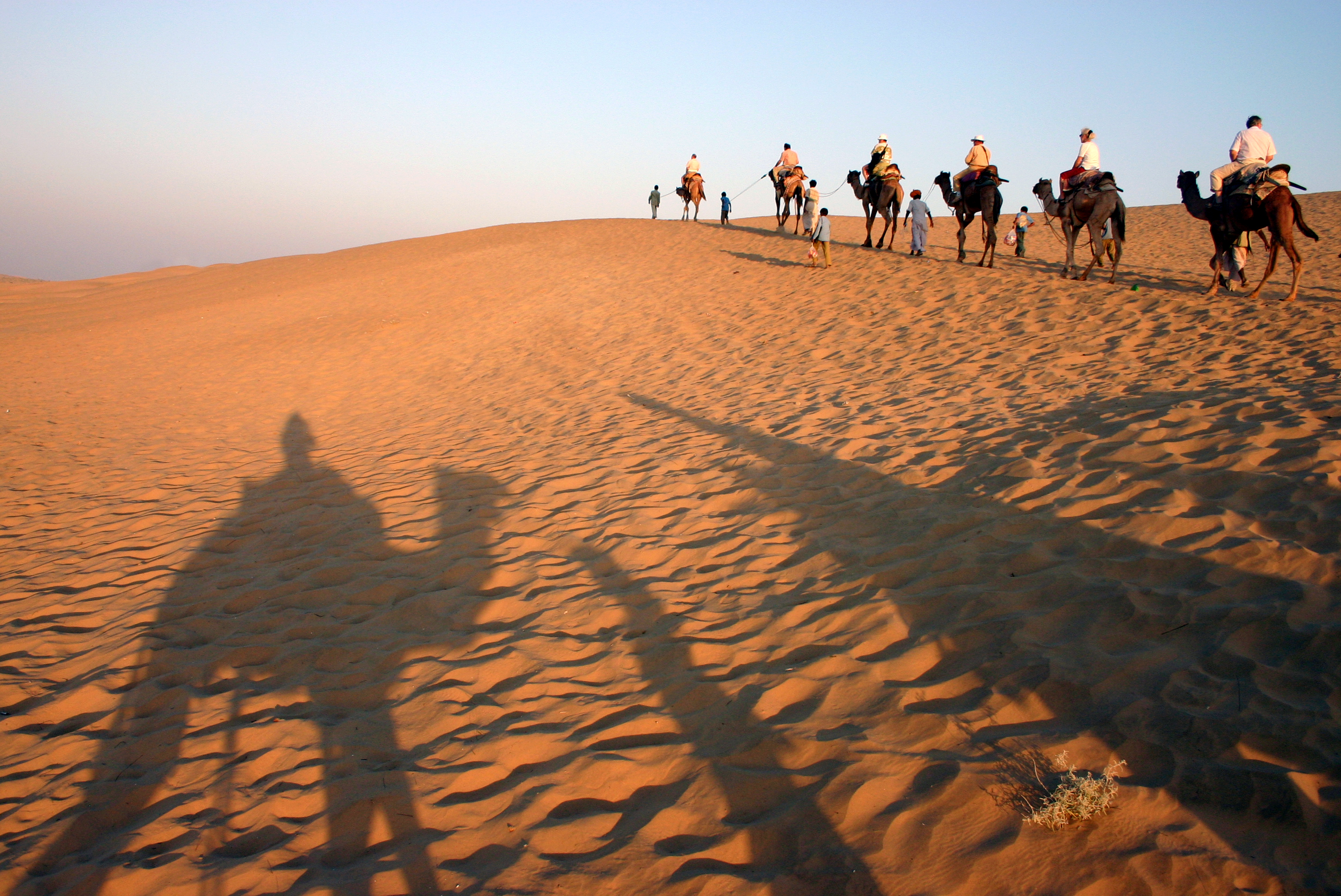
Camel ride in the Thar desert near Jaisalmer.

  - Deserts of Rajasthan
  - Thar Desert
  - Rivers of Rajasthan
  - Luni River
  - Chambal River
  - Arvari River (Alwar)
  - Magan River
  - Banas River
  - Berach River
  - Bandi River
  - Banganga River
  - Bhagani River (Alwar)
  - Gambhir River
  - Ghaggar-Hakra River
  - Gomati River (Rajasthan)
  - Garri River
  - Sahibi river
    - Dohan river
    - Sota river
    - Kotkasim drain
    - Krishnavati river
    - Indori river
- Mountains of Rajasthan
  - Aravalli Range

=== Regions of Rajasthan ===
There are mainly Four Regions of rajasthan.

- Dhundhar
  - Ahirwal
  - Mewat
- Hadoti
- Marwar
  - Gorwar
- Gaurati
- Mewar
- Shekhawati
  - Bagar tract
- Vagad

==== Ecoregions of Rajasthan ====
- Ghagghar planes in north
- Very humid eastern planes
- Humid aravalli range
- Semi-arid western planes
- Arid far western thar dessert

==== Administrative divisions of Rajasthan ====
Administrative divisions of Rajasthan

- Districts of Rajasthan
  - Municipalities of Rajasthan

===== Districts of Rajasthan =====
Districts of Rajasthan

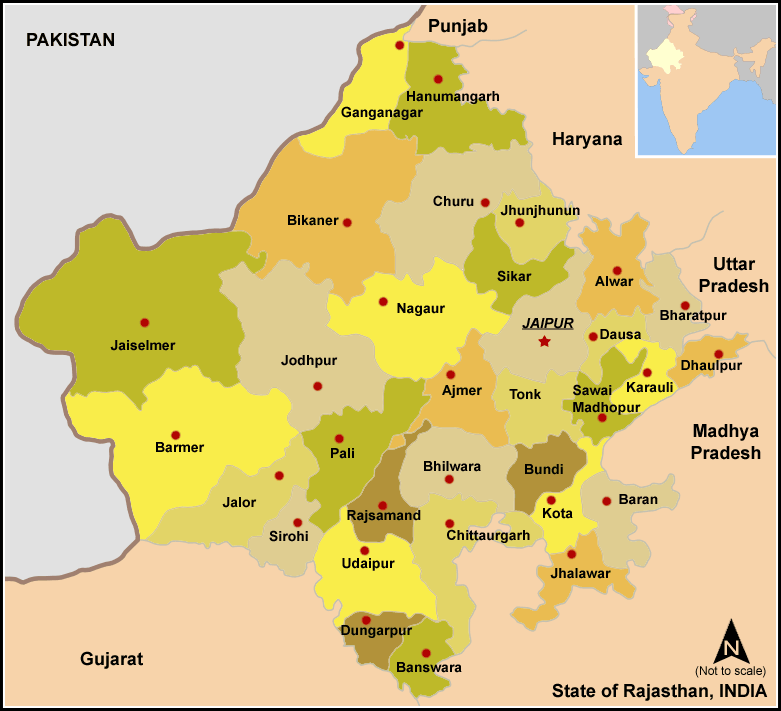
Districts of Rajasthan

1. Ajmer district
2. Alwar district
3. Balotra district
4. Banswara district
5. Baran district
6. Barmer district
7. Beawar district
8. Bharatpur district
9. Bhilwara district
10. Bikaner district
11. Bundi district
12. Chittorgarh district
13. Churu district
14. Dausa district
15. Deeg district
16. Didwana-Kuchaman district
17. Dholpur district
18. Dungarpur district
19. Hanumangarh district
20. Jaipur district
21. Jaisalmer district
22. Jalor district
23. Jhalawar district
24. Jhunjhunu district
25. Jodhpur district
26. Karauli district
27. Khairthal-Tijara district
28. Kotputli-Behror district
29. Kota district
30. Nagaur district
31. Pali district
32. Phalodi district
33. Pratapgarh district
34. Rajsamand district
35. Salumbar district
36. Sawai Madhopur district
37. Sikar district
38. Sirohi district
39. Sri Ganganagar district
40. Tonk district
41. Udaipur district

===== Municipalities of Rajasthan =====
Rajasthan stub

Municipalities of Rajasthan

- Capital of Rajasthan: Capital of Rajasthan
- Cities of Rajasthan

=== Demography of Rajasthan ===
Demographics of Rajasthan

== Government and politics of Rajasthan ==
- Form of government:
- Capital of Rajasthan: Capital of Rajasthan
- Elections in Rajasthan
- Political parties in Rajasthan
- Political scandals of Rajasthan
- Taxation in Rajasthan

=== Branches of the government of Rajasthan ===
Government of Rajasthan

==== Executive branch of the government of Rajasthan ====
- Governor
  - List of governors of Rajasthan
- Ministers in Government of Rajasthan
  - Chief Minister
    - Chief Ministers of Rajasthan
- Chief Secretaries of Rajasthan

===== State agencies of Rajasthan =====
- Board of Secondary Education, Rajasthan
- HCM Rajasthan State Institute of Public Administration
- Jaipur Development Authority
- Rajasthan Arabic and Persian Research Institute
- Rajasthan Financial Corporation
- Rajasthan Khadi and Village Industries Board
- Rajasthan Oriental Research Institute
- Rajasthan Public Service Commission
- Rajasthan Rajya Vidyut Utpadan Nigam
- Rajasthan State Archives
- Rajasthan State Industrial Development and Investment Corporation
- Rajasthan State Mines and Minerals Limited
- Rajasthan State Road Transport Corporation
- Rajasthan State Sports Council
- Rajasthan Tourism Development Corporation
- Rural Non Farm Development Agency
- SPINFED

==== Legislative branch of the government of Rajasthan ====
- Speaker
  - List of speakers of the Rajasthan Legislative Assembly
- Rajasthan Legislative Assembly
  - Members of the Rajasthan Legislative Assembly (13th house)

==== Judicial branch of the government of Rajasthan ====
- Rajasthan High Court
  - Chief Justice
    - List of chief justices of Rajasthan High Court

=== Law and order in Rajasthan ===
Law of Rajasthan

- Capital punishment in Rajasthan
- Constitution of Rajasthan
- Criminal justice system of Rajasthan
- Crime in Rajasthan
  - Organized crime in Rajasthan
- Human rights in Rajasthan
  - Freedom of the press in Rajasthan
  - Freedom of religion in Rajasthan
  - LGBT rights in Rajasthan
- Law enforcement in Rajasthan
  - Rajasthan Police
- Penal system of Rajasthan

== History of Rajasthan ==
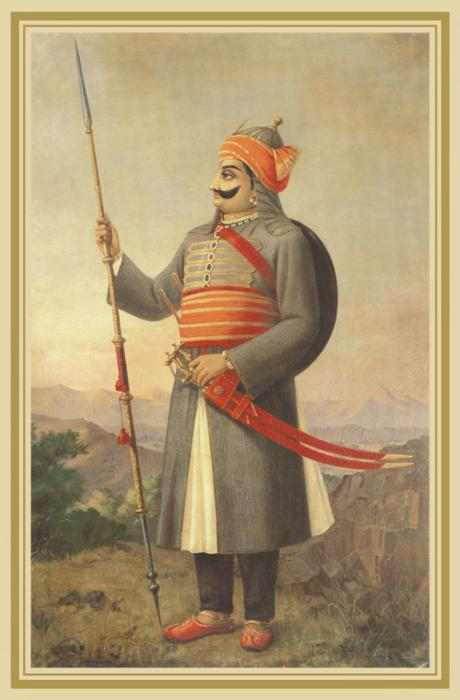
Maharana Pratap, a ruler and great warrior of his time.

History of Rajasthan

- Timeline of history of Rajasthan
- Current events of Rajasthan

=== History of Rajasthan, by period ===
- Vedic and earlier cultures
  - Sothi culture
  - Ahar-Banas culture
  - Ochre Coloured Pottery culture
  - Black and red ware culture
  - Painted Grey Ware
  - Northern Black Polished Ware
  - Rang Mahal culture
- Muslim conquest in the Indian subcontinent
  - Caliphate campaigns in India (738 CE)

=== History of Rajasthan, by region ===
Gorwar region

=== History of Rajasthan, by subject ===
- Rajputs
  - Jauhar
  - Prithviraj Chauhan
  - Maharana Pratap
    - Battle of Haldighati

== Culture of Rajasthan ==
Culture of Rajasthan

- Architecture of Rajasthan
  - List of palaces in Rajasthan
- Cuisine of Rajasthan
- Ethnic minorities in Rajasthan
- Festivals in Rajasthan
- Humor in Rajasthan
- Media in Rajasthan
- Monuments of National Importance in Rajasthan
- Museums and art galleries in Rajasthan
- People of Rajasthan
  - People from Rajasthan
- Prostitution in Rajasthan
- Public holidays in Rajasthan
- Records of Rajasthan
- Religion in Rajasthan
  - Buddhism in Rajasthan
  - Christianity in Rajasthan
  - Hinduism in Rajasthan
  - Islam in Rajasthan
  - Jainism in Rajasthan
  - Judaism in Rajasthan
  - Sikhism in Rajasthan
- World Heritage Sites in Rajasthan

=== Art in Rajasthan ===
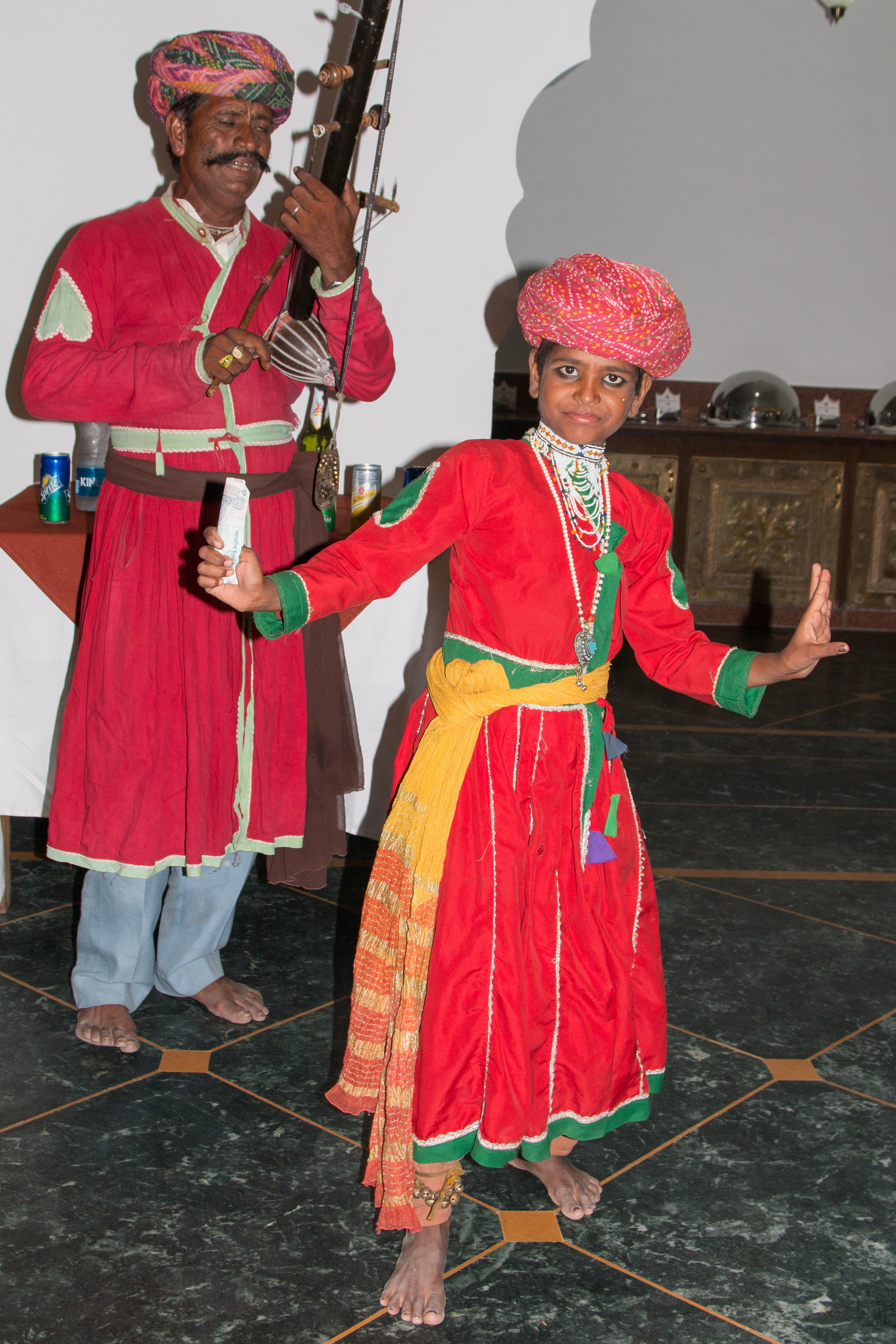
Young boy playing a dance nritta

- Art in Rajasthan
- Folk dances of Rajasthan
- Cinema of Rajasthan
  - Films shot in Rajasthan
  - Rajasthani-language films
- Literature of Rajasthan
- Music of Rajasthan
- Television in Rajasthan
- Theatre in Rajasthan

=== Language in Rajasthan ===
- Rajasthani language – language of the Indo-Aryan languages family. It is spoken by 20 million people in Rajasthan and neighboring states of India and Pakistan, or 50 million if Marwari if counted as Rajasthani, as it often is.
  - Rajasthani language movement
- Ahirwati
- Bagri
- Harauti
- Marwari
- Mewari
- Mewati
- Other major languages and dialects
- Shekhawati
  - Dhatki
  - Goaria
  - Godwari
  - Loarki
  - Gade Lohar
  - Gujari
  - Gurgula
  - Lambadi
  - Malvi
  - Nimadi

=== Sports in Rajasthan ===
- Cricket in Rajasthan
  - Rajasthan Cricket Association
  - Rajasthan cricket team
  - Rajasthan Royals
- Football in Rajasthan
  - Rajasthan football team

=== Symbols of Rajasthan ===
Symbols of Rajasthan

- State animal: Chinkara
- State bird: Indian bustard
- State flower: Rohira
- State seal: Seal of Rajasthan
- State tree: Khejri

== Economy and infrastructure of Rajasthan ==
Economy of Rajasthan

- Economic rank (by nominal GDP):
- Agriculture in Rajasthan
- Banking in Rajasthan
  - Bank of Rajasthan
- Communications in Rajasthan
  - Internet in Rajasthan
- Companies of Rajasthan
- Currency of Rajasthan:
- Economic history of Rajasthan
- Energy in Rajasthan
  - Energy policy of Rajasthan
  - Oil industry in Rajasthan
- Health care in Rajasthan
- Mining in Rajasthan
- Rajasthan Stock Exchange
- Tourism in Rajasthan
- Transport in Rajasthan
  - Airports in Rajasthan
  - Rail transport in Rajasthan
  - State highways in Rajasthan
- Water supply and sanitation in Rajasthan

== Education in Rajasthan ==
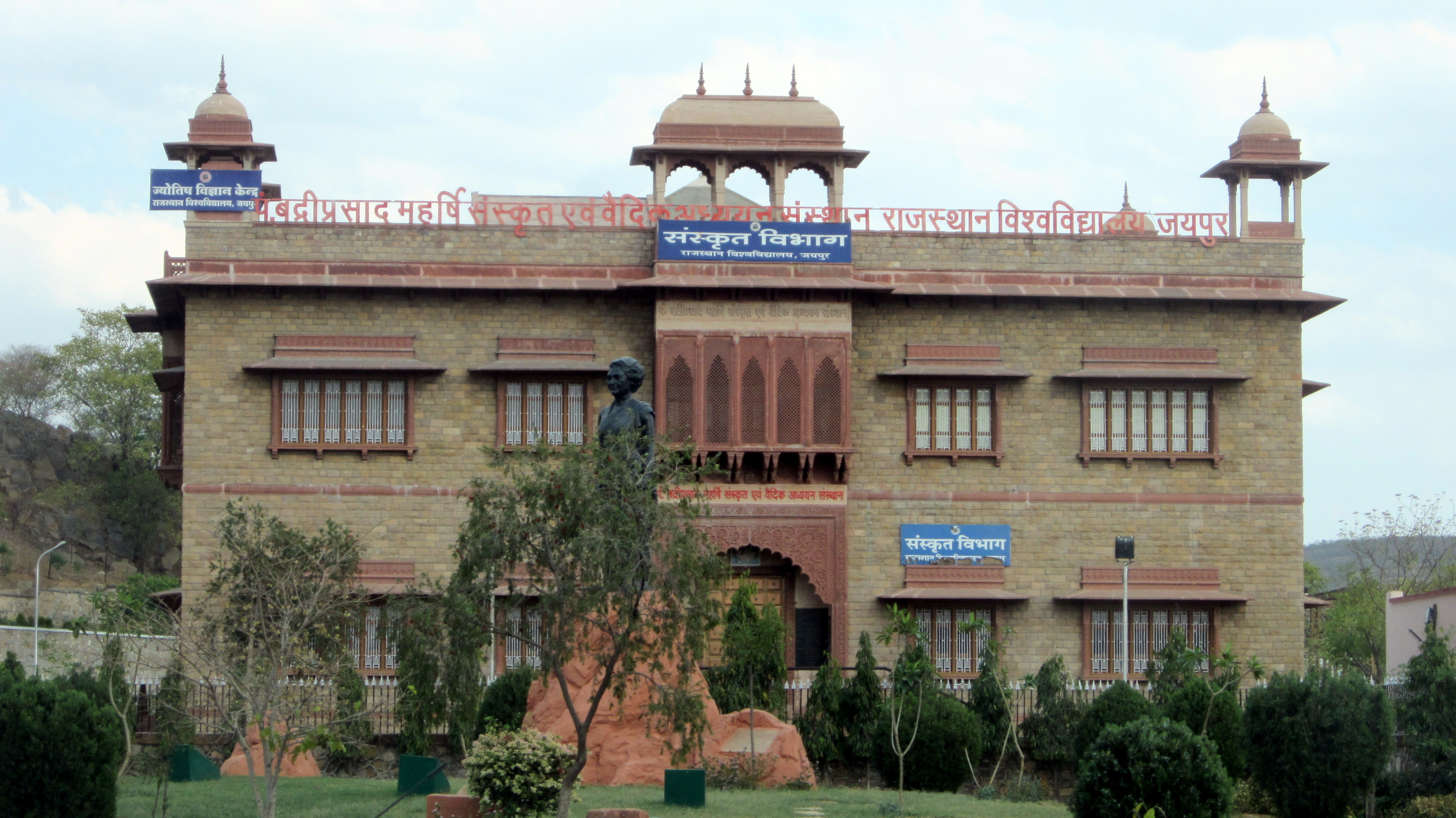
Department of Sanskrit, University of Rajasthan

Education in Rajasthan

- List of schools in Rajasthan
  - List of schools in Kota Rajasthan
- Institutions of higher education in Rajasthan
  - Amity University Rajasthan
  - Central University of Rajasthan
  - Rajasthan College
  - Rajasthan College of Engineering for Women
  - University of Rajasthan
    - University of Rajasthan Library
  - Medical colleges in Rajasthan
    - Rajasthan pharmacy college
    - Rajasthan University of Health Sciences
    - Sawai Man Singh Medical College
    - Sardar Patel Medical College
    - Rabindranath Tagore Medical College
    - Dr. Sampurnanand Medical College
    - Jawaharlal Nehru Medical College, Ajmer
    - Shri Kalyan Medical College, Sikar
    - Government Medical College (Kota)
    - Rajmata Vijaya Raje Scindia Medical College, Bhilwara

== Health in Rajasthan ==
- Malnutrition in Rajasthan
- Water supply and sanitation in Rajasthan

== See also ==
- List of international rankings
- Outline of geography
- Ahore (Rajasthan Assembly constituency)
- Bali (Rajasthan Assembly constituency)
- Dr. Sarvepalli Radhakrishnan Rajasthan Ayurved University
- East Rajasthan Uplands
- Ganges Canal (Rajasthan)
- Gomati River (Rajasthan)
- HCM Rajasthan State Institute of Public Administration
- Historical battles of Rajasthan
- Jaga (Rajasthan)
- Jagadguru Ramanadacharya Rajasthan Sanskrit University
- Jagas of Rajasthan
- Jalore (Rajasthan Assembly constituency)
- Janardan Rai Nagar Rajasthan Vidyapeeth University
- List of constituencies of Rajasthan Vidhan Sabha
- List of Rajasthan Royals cricketers
- List of Rajya Sabha members from Rajasthan
- List of Sahitya Akademi Award winners for Rajasthani
- List of Scheduled castes in Rajasthan
- List of Speakers of Rajasthan Legislative Assembly
- List of State Protected Monuments in Rajasthan
- Major Rajasthani
- Pali (Rajasthan Assembly constituency)
- Parbati River (Rajasthan)
- Political families of Rajasthan
- Raj Bhavan (Rajasthan)
- Rajasthan (film)
- Rajasthan Accounts Service
- Rajasthan Administrative Service
- Rajasthan Arabic and Persian Research Institute
- Rajasthan Assembly Building
- Rajasthan Atomic Power Station
- Rajasthan Basin
- Rajasthan Electronics and Instruments Limited
- Rajasthan High Court
- Rajasthan Institute of Engineering and Technology
- Rajasthan Khadi and Village Industries Board
- Rajasthan Legislative Assembly
- Rajasthan Nirman Mazdoor Sangathan
- Rajasthan Oriental Research Institute
- Rajasthan Patrika
- Rajasthan Pradesh Congress Committee
- Rajasthan Pre-Engineering Test
- Rajasthan Public Service Commission
- Rajasthan Rajya Vidyut Utpadan Nigam
- Rajasthan Roots
- Rajasthan Royals
- Rajasthan State Archives
- Rajasthan State Industrial Development and Investment Corporation
- Rajasthan State Mines and Minerals Limited
- Rajasthan State Road Transport Corporation
- Rajasthan State Sports Council
- Rajasthan Technical University
- Rajasthan Tourism Development Corporation
- Rajasthan Vikas Party
- Rajgarh (Rajasthan)
- Royal Rajasthan on Wheels
- Shaikh of Rajasthan
- Sumerpur (Rajasthan Assembly constituency)
- Swami Keshwanand Rajasthan Agricultural University
