= List of museums in Rajasthan =

Below is a list of museums and art galleries in Rajasthan, India:

Name	District	Details
Government Museum, Ajmer	Ajmer	
Government Museum, Alwar	Alwar	
Government Museum, Bharatpur	Bharatpur	
Birla Museum, Pilani	Jhunjhunu	
Fort Museum, Junagarh Fort, Bikaner	Bikaner	
Ganga Golden Jubilee Museum, Bikaner	Bikaner	
Government Museum, Bikaner	Bikaner	
Rajasthan State Archives, Bikaner	Bikaner	
Fateh Prakash Palace Museum, Chittaurgarh	Chittorgarh	
Dungarpur Museum	Dungarpur	
Albert Hall Museum, Jaipur	Jaipur	
Amer Archaeological Museum, Amer, India	Jaipur	
Bairat Virat Nagar Museum	Jaipur	
City Palace, Jaipur	Jaipur	
Hawa Mahal Museum, Jaipur	Jaipur	
Jaigarh Arms museum, jaipur	Jaipur	
Jawahar Kala Kendra, Jaipur	Jaipur	
Maharaja Sawai Man Singh Ji Museum, Jaipur	Jaipur	
Modern Art Gallery, Ram Niwas Bagh	Jaipur	
Government Museum, Jaisalmer	Jaisalmer	
Jaisalmer Folklore Museum	Jaisalmer	
Government Museum, Jhalawar	Jhalawar	
Government Museum, Jodhpur	Jodhpur	
Mehrangarh Fort Museum, Jodhpur	Jodhpur	
Rajasthan Oriental Research Institute, Jodhpur	Jodhpur	
Umaid Bhawan Palace Museum, Jodhpur	Jodhpur	
Government Museum, Pali	Pali	
Government Museum, Sikar	Sikar	
Rajasthan Arabic and Persian Research Institute, Tonk	Tonk	
Bharatiya Lok Kala Mandal, Udaipur	Udaipur	
Government Museum, Ahar	Udaipur	
Castle Kanota Museum,	Jaipur	

== See also ==
- List of museums in India
