= List of companies in Gujarat =

Gujarat based companies

Gujarat is a state along the western coast of India. This is a list of NSE/BSE-indexed conglomerates or public companies with corporate offices in Gujarat.

== List ==
The list below is a list of public companies headquartered in Gujarat.

| S/N | Company Name | Headquarters City | Sector | Official Website | Ref(s) BSE ID/NSE ID | State Controlled |
|---|---|---|---|---|---|---|
| 1 | Aarvee Denims & Exports Ltd | Ahmedabad | Textile | | BSE: 514274 NSE: AARVEEDEN | |
| 2 | ABC Bearings Ltd | Bharuch | Manufacturing (Bearings) | | BSE: 505665 NSE: ABCBEARING | |
| 3 | Adani Enterprises Ltd | Ahmedabad | Diversified (Infrastructure, IT, Mining, Defence etc.) | | BSE: 512599 NSE: ADANIENT | |
| 4 | Adani Green Energy Ltd | Ahmedabad | Renewable Energy | | BSE: 541450 NSE: ADANIGREEN | |
| 5 | Adani Ports and Special Economic Zone Ltd | Ahmedabad | Logistics & Ports | | BSE: 532921 NSE: ADANIPORTS | |
| 6 | Adani Power Ltd | Ahmedabad | Power generation & distribution | | BSE: 533096 NSE: ADANIPOWER | |
| 7 | Alembic Pharmaceuticals Ltd | Vadodara | Pharmaceuticals | | BSE: 533573 NSE: ALEMBICLTD | |
| 8 | Apar Industries Ltd | Vadodara | Electrical Equipment | | BSE: 532259 NSE: APARIND | |
| 9 | Ami Organics Ltd | Surat | Chemicals | | BSE: 543267 NSE: AMIORGANZ | |
| 10 | Arvind Fashions Ltd | Ahmedabad | Retail (Apparel & Accessories) | | BSE: 539254 NSE: ARVINDFASN | |
| 11 | Arvind Ltd | Ahmedabad | Textile | | BSE: 500101 NSE: ARVIND | |
| 12 | 20 MICRONS | Vadodara | Mining and Metals | | BSE: 533022 NSE: 20MICRONS | |
| 13 | Ashima Ltd | Ahmedabad | Textile | | BSE: 521030 NSE: ASHIMASQ | |
| 14 | Astral Limited | Ahmedabad | Pipes & Adhesives | | BSE: 532830 NSE: ASTRAL | |
| 15 | Atul Ltd | Valsad | Chemicals | | BSE: 500027 NSE: ATUL | |
| 16 | Balaji Amines Ltd | Vadodara | Chemicals | | BSE: 530449 NSE: BALAMINES | |
| 17 | Bank of Baroda | Vadodara | Banking | | BSE: 532134 NSE: BANKBARODA | |
| 18 | Banco Products India Ltd | Vadodara | Auto Ancillaries | | BSE: 500039 NSE: BANCOINDIA | |
| 19 | Bhageria Industries Ltd | Surat | Chemicals | | BSE: 539448 NSE: BHAGERIYA | |
| 20 | Cadila Pharmaceuticals Ltd | Ahmedabad | Pharmaceuticals | | | |
| 21 | Chemcon Speciality Chemicals Ltd | Vadodara | Chemicals | | BSE: 543233 NSE: CHEMCON | |
| 22 | Deep Industries Ltd | Ahmedabad | Oil and Gas | | BSE: 532760 NSE: DEEPIND | |
| 23 | Dishman Carbogen Amcis Ltd | Ahmedabad | Pharmaceuticals & Contract Manufacturing | | BSE: 540701 NSE: DISHMAN | |
| 24 | Deepak Nitrite limited | Vadodara | Chemicals | | BSE: 506401 NSE: DEEPAKNTR | |
| 25 | Eris Lifesciences Ltd | Ahmedabad | Pharmaceuticals | | BSE: 540596 NSE: ERIS | |
| 26 | Gokul Refoils and Solvent Ltd | Ahmedabad | Edible Oils & Agro-Processing | | BSE: 532980 NSE: GOKULREFO | |
| 27 | Gujarat Alkalies and Chemicals Ltd | Vadodara | Chemicals | | BSE: 530001 NSE: GUJALKALI | Yes |
| 28 | Gujarat Ambuja Exports Ltd | Ahmedabad | Agro-Processing & Trading | | BSE: 524226 NSE: GAEL | |
| 29 | Gujarat Apollo Industries Ltd | Ahmedabad | Manufacturing & Industrial Machinery | | BSE: 522217 NSE: GUJAPOLLO | |
| 30 | Tatva Chintan Pharma Chem Ltd | Vadodara | Pharmaceutical & Speciality Chemicals | | BSE: 543321 NSE: TATVA | |
| 31 | Gujarat Gas Ltd | Ahmedabad | Oil and Gas | | BSE: 539336 NSE: GUJGASLTD | Yes |
| 32 | Transpek Industries Ltd | Vadodara | Chemicals | | BSE: 506687 NSE: TRANSPEK | |
| 33 | Gujarat Mineral Development Corporation Ltd | Ahmedabad | Mining | | BSE: 532181 NSE: GMDCLTD | Yes |
| 34 | Gujarat Narmada Valley Fertilizers and Chemicals Ltd | Bharuch | Chemicals | | BSE: 500670 NSE: GNFC | Yes |
| 35 | Gujarat Pipavav Port Ltd | Amreli | Transportation & Shipping Ports | | BSE: 533248 NSE: GPPL | Yes |
| 36 | Gujarat State Fertilizers and Chemicals Ltd | Vadodara | Chemicals | | BSE: 500690 NSE: GSFC | Yes |
| 37 | Gujarat State Petronet Ltd | Gandhinagar | Oil and Gas | | BSE: 532702 NSE: GSPL | Yes |
| 38 | Gujarat Themis Biosyn Ltd | Ankleshwar | Pharmaceuticals | | BSE: 532067 NSE: THEMISPHAR | Yes |
| 39 | Gujarat Urja Vikas Nigam Ltd | Vadodara | Power Generation & Distribution | | BSE: 532015 NSE: GUVNL | Yes |
| 40 | Gujarat Venture Finance Ltd | Ahmedabad | Financial Services | | BSE: 511509 NSE: GVFL | Yes |
| 41 | Group Landmark | Ahmedabad | Automobile | | NSE: LANDMARK; BSE: 543714 | |
| 42 | Jyoti Ltd | Vadodara | Electrical equipment | | BSE: 504076 | |
| 43 | JMC Projects (India) Ltd | Ahmedabad | Infrastructure & Construction | | BSE: 522263 NSE: JMCPROJECT | |
| 44 | KPI Green Energy Ltd. | Surat | Renewable Energy | | BSE: 542323 NSE: KPIGREEN | |
| 45 | KP Energy Ltd. | Surat | Renewable Energy | | BSE: 539686 | |
| 46 | Kiri Industries Ltd | Surat | Chemicals | | BSE: 532943 NSE: KIRIINDUS | |
| 47 | L&T Technology Services | Vadodara | Information technology & Services | | BSE: 540115 NSE: LTTS | |
| 48 | Mangalam Drugs and Organics Ltd | Ahmedabad | Pharmaceuticals | | BSE: 532637 NSE: MANGALAM | |
| 49 | Meghmani Organics Ltd | Ahmedabad | Chemicals | | BSE: 532865 NSE: MEGH | |
| 50 | Mishtann Foods Limited | Ahmedabad | Food | | BSE: 539594 | |
| 51 | RR KABELS | Vadodara | Cables | | BSE: 543981 NSE: RRKABEL | |
| 52 | Nirma Ltd | Ahmedabad | Consumer Goods - Household & Personal Products | | BSE: 500310 NSE: NIRMA | |
| 53 | ONGC Petro additions Ltd | Vadodara | Oil and Gas | | BSE: 541450 NSE: OPAL | Yes |
| 54 | Patel Integrated Logistics Ltd | Ahmedabad | Logistics & Warehousing | | BSE: 526381 NSE: PATINTLOG | |
| 55 | Ratnamani Metals and Tubes Ltd | Ahmedabad | Manufacturing - Steel | | BSE: 520111 NSE: RATNAMANI | |
| 56 | Shaily Engineering and Plastics Ltd | Vadodara | Plastic | | BSE: 501423 NSE: SHAILY | |
| 57 | Styrenix Performance Material Limited | Vadodara | Chemicals | | BSE: 506222 NSE: STYRENIX | |
| 58 | Shilchar Technology Limited | Vadodara | Electrical Equipment | | BSE: 531201 NSE: SHILCHAR | |
| 59 | Sadbhav Engineering Ltd | Ahmedabad | Infrastructure & Construction | | BSE: 532710 NSE: SADBHAVENG | |
| 60 | Sadbhav Infrastructure Project Ltd | Ahmedabad | Infrastructure & Construction | | BSE: 539346 NSE: SADBHIN | |
| 61 | Voltamp Transformers Ltd | Vadodara | Electrical equipment | | BSE: 532757 NSE: VOLTAMP | |
| 62 | Zydus Lifesciences Limited | Ahmedabad | Pharmaceuticals | | BSE: 532321 NSE: ZYDUSWELL | |
| 63 | Arete Group | Vapi | Real Estate | | | |

== See also ==
- List of conglomerates in Tamil Nadu
- List of companies of Rajasthan
