= List of companies of Rajasthan =

Rajasthan based companies

The list below is a list of companies headquartered in Rajasthan.

- Adarsh Co-operative Bank
- Amrapali Jewels
- Anokhi
- AU Small Finance Bank
- Chambal Fertilisers
- Dawakhana Shifaul Amraz
- FCI Aravali Gypsum and Minerals India Limited
- Fingrowth Co-operative Bank Limited
- Hindustan Zinc
- HRH Group of Hotels
- NBC Bearings
- Rajasthan Patrika
- Rajasthan State Mines and Minerals Limited
- Supreme Airlines
- Wonder Cement
- Haldiram
- Bikaji Foods International Ltd
- V2 reatil Mart
- Bisleri

== See also ==
- List of companies in Gujarat
