= Lanela =

Coordinates: 27°4′56″N 70°49′3″E

- Village
- Interactive map of Lanela
- Location within Rajasthan Location within India
- Country: India
- State: Rajasthan
- District: Jaisalmer

Area
  - Total: 55.93 km^{2} (21.59 sq mi)

Population (2011)
  - Total: 1,049
  - Density: 18.76/km^{2} (48.58/sq mi)
- Time zone: UTC+5:30 (IST)
- PIN: 345001

Lanela is a village located in the district of Jaisalmer in the state of Rajasthan in India. It has a population of about 1,049 persons living in around 194 households as of the 2011 census. It is 25 kilometres from Jaisalmer city.

== History ==
Lanela is a Paliwal village, about 1,000 years old. The word "Lanela" means "Lavanya Illa" which means "The Land with Beauty".

== Geological survey of Lanela ==
Ammonites Study of the Jurassic Rocks of Jaisalmer basin, Rajasthan. A research Project to evaluate ammonite fauna from the Jurassic rocks of Jaisalmer district was taken up during F.S. 1996‐98 under the Palaeontology Division of the western region, Jaipur. Intensive fieldwork was carried out in the area around Jaisalmer to study different litho‐packages and collect ammonite fauna to establish biozonation. The marine Jurassic succession of the Jaisalmer basin has been classified into three distinct formations, namely the Jaisalmer, Baisakhi, and Bedesar Formations in ascending order of antiquity. These are underlain by a non‐marine sequence of the Lathi Formation which has been dated as Liassic to Bathonian by Das Gupta (1975) and as Liassic by Lukose (1972).

The calcareous Jaisalmer Formation is followed upward by a siliciclastic sediments of Baisakhi Formation. The Baisakhi Formation in general comprises shale, sandstone, siltstone and ironstone and is subdivided into Rupsi, Lodorva, and Lanella members in ascending order by Prasad (2006). The Rupsi and Lanella Members of the Formation contain profuse ammonites and can be dated as Early kimmeridgian to Late Kimmeridgian in age. The middle Lodorva Member is unfossiliferous.

== Geography and climate ==
The area is sandy on one side, barren land on the other side, fertile Khadins are there, and a saltwater lake is situated on one side.

Digitally processed satellite images have unearthed the hidden course of a major lost river below the sands of the Thar Desert, in the India–Pakistan (Indo-Pak) region. The great Himalayan river of the Vedic period (10 000–8000 BP) is mentioned in ancient Indian literature. It was called the ‘Saraswati’ in India and the ‘Hakra’ in Pakistan and it dried up during 4000–3500 BP. Large numbers of archaeological sites from the Harappan civilization occur along the dry river bed. The mapped course of the river is 4–10 km wide and conforms to the size described in the Rigveda. The newly described course is validated through the drilling of tube wells in the channels and through archaeological, hydrogeological and sedimentary data. An enormous quantity of potable water has been found along these channels. The path of the (main) river course, the likelihood of the river shift and the reasons for its disappearance are discussed. One path traced out as below-mentioned: Bahla–Ratund–Mohangarh–Lanela–Dawa–Devran–Giral–Kanod–Gadra road (A. K. Guptaa, J. R. Sharmab & G. Sreenivasan, pages 5197-5216, Using satellite imagery to reveal the course of an extinct river below the Thar Desert in the Indo-Pak region, International Journal of Remote Sensing, volume 32, issue 18, 2011).

== Soil and Land ==
The Indian Thar Desert comprises about 70% part of the western Rajasthan incorporating 8 saline districts processing salt lakes and salt basins; in them, Jaisalmer (Lanela and Pokhran) is one of them

== Akashvani relay centre ==
A strong FM wave radio relay centre situated at Lanela.

== Demographics ==
Lanela has a population of 1,049 people with 543 being males and 506 being females. The children population is 193 children, making up 18.4% of the village's population. The population density is 18.76 inhabitants per square kilometer (48.58mi²). The average literacy rate is 68.57%.

=== Castes ===
Type of castes in Lanela:
1. Scheduled Castes (41.8%)
2. Scheduled Tribes (10.5%)
3. Not Indigenous (47.8%)
Source: Census of India

As per 2011 census, Lanela has a scheduled caste population of 438 people, scheduled tribe population of 110 people and non indigenous are 501.
