= Economy of Rajasthan =

Statistics
- Population: ▲82,406,000 (2025)
- GDP: ▲₹21.52 lakh crore (US$230 billion) (2026-27est.)
- GDP rank: 7th
- GDP growth: 10% 2025-26est.)
- GDP per capita: ▲₹2.45 lakh (US$2,617) (2025-26)
- GDP per capita rank: 22nd
- GDP by sector: Agriculture 27% Industry 24% Services 41% (2021–22)
- Population below national poverty line: ▼0.71% in poverty (2017–18)
- Human Development Index: ▲0.692 medium (2023) (23rd)
- Labour force by occupation: Agriculture 44% Industry 8% Services 47% (2015)
- Unemployment: ▲120.8% (Oct 2022)

Public finance
- Government debt: 21of GSDP (2023–24 est.)
- Budget balance: ₹−58,212 crore (US$−6.2 billion) 4.4% of GSDP (2022–23 est.)
- Revenue: ₹2.15 lakh crore (US$23 billion) (2022–23 est.)
- Spending: ₹2.73 lakh crore (US$29 billion) (2022–23 est.)
- All values, unless otherwise stated, are in US dollars.

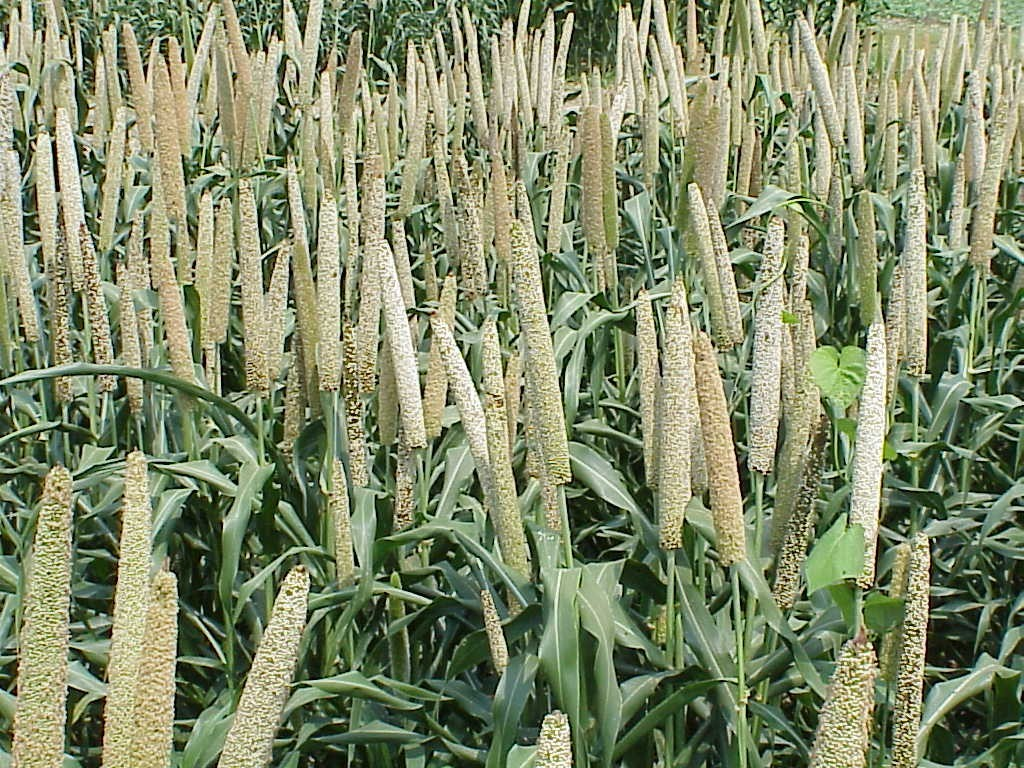
Bajra field

Rajasthan is a mineral-rich state of India, with agriculture, mining and tourism as its main engines of growth. The state's mines produce gold, silver, sandstone, limestone, marble, rock phosphate, copper and lignite. It is the second-largest producer of cement and contributes one tenth of the salt produced in India.

== Agriculture ==
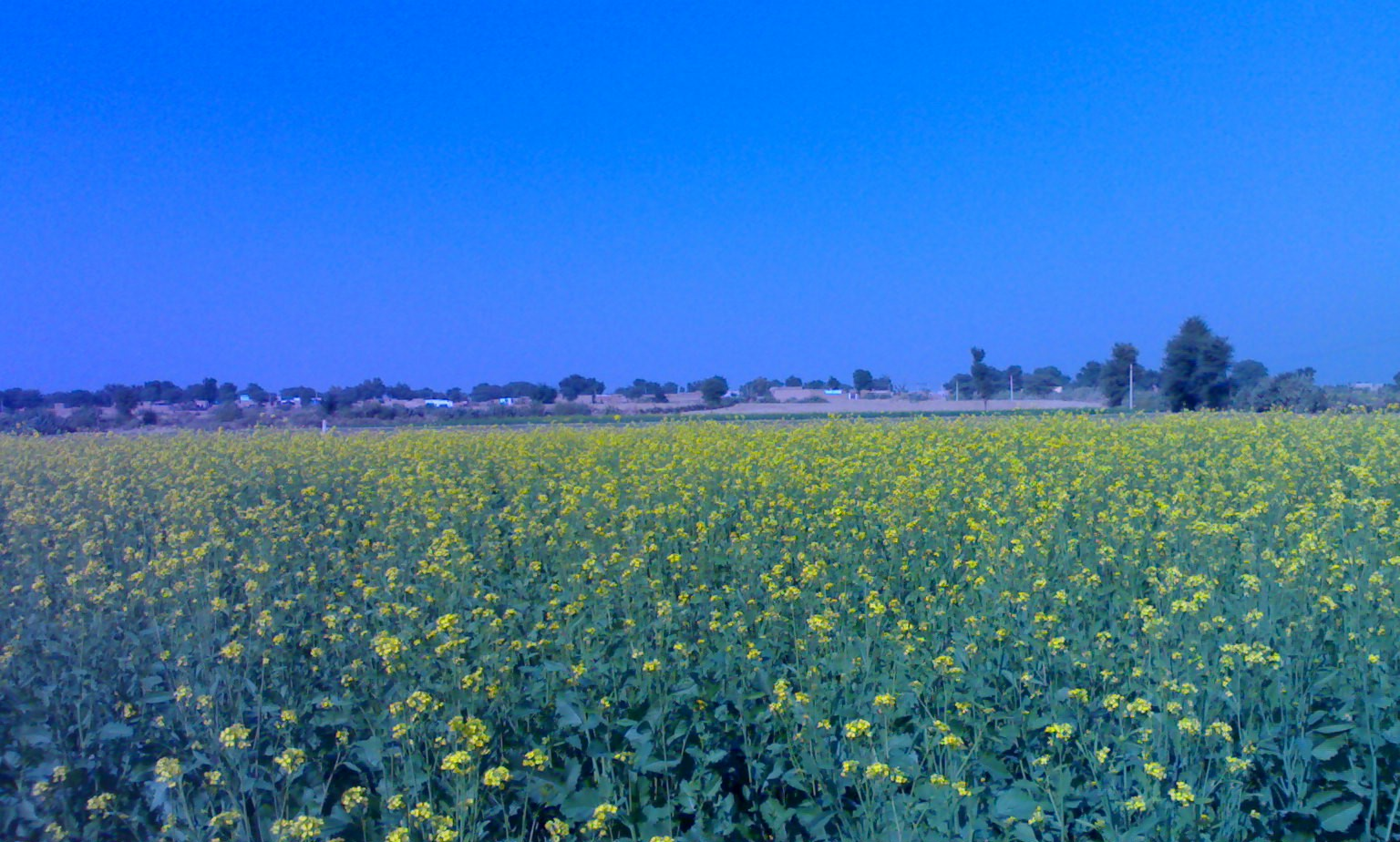
Mustard fields in a village of Rajasthan

Wheat and barley are cultivated in large areas, as are pulses, sugarcane, and oilseeds. Cotton and tobacco are cash crops. Rajasthan is among the largest producers of edible oils in India and the second largest producer of oilseeds. Rajasthan is also the biggest wool-producing state in India. There are mainly two crop seasons Kharif and Rabi. The main source of irrigation is wells and tanks. The Indira Gandhi Canal irrigates northwestern Rajasthan.

Rajasthan is the largest producer of rapeseed, bajra, mustard and wool in India and the second largest producer of oilseeds and spices and milk. Rajasthan is third largest producer of soya bean and coarse cereals in India.

Rajasthan is also the leading producer of milk in North India. Saras milk product brand of Rajasthan Co-operative Milk Producer Union has its outlets in Jodhpur(HQ), Jaipur and New Delhi.

== Industries ==
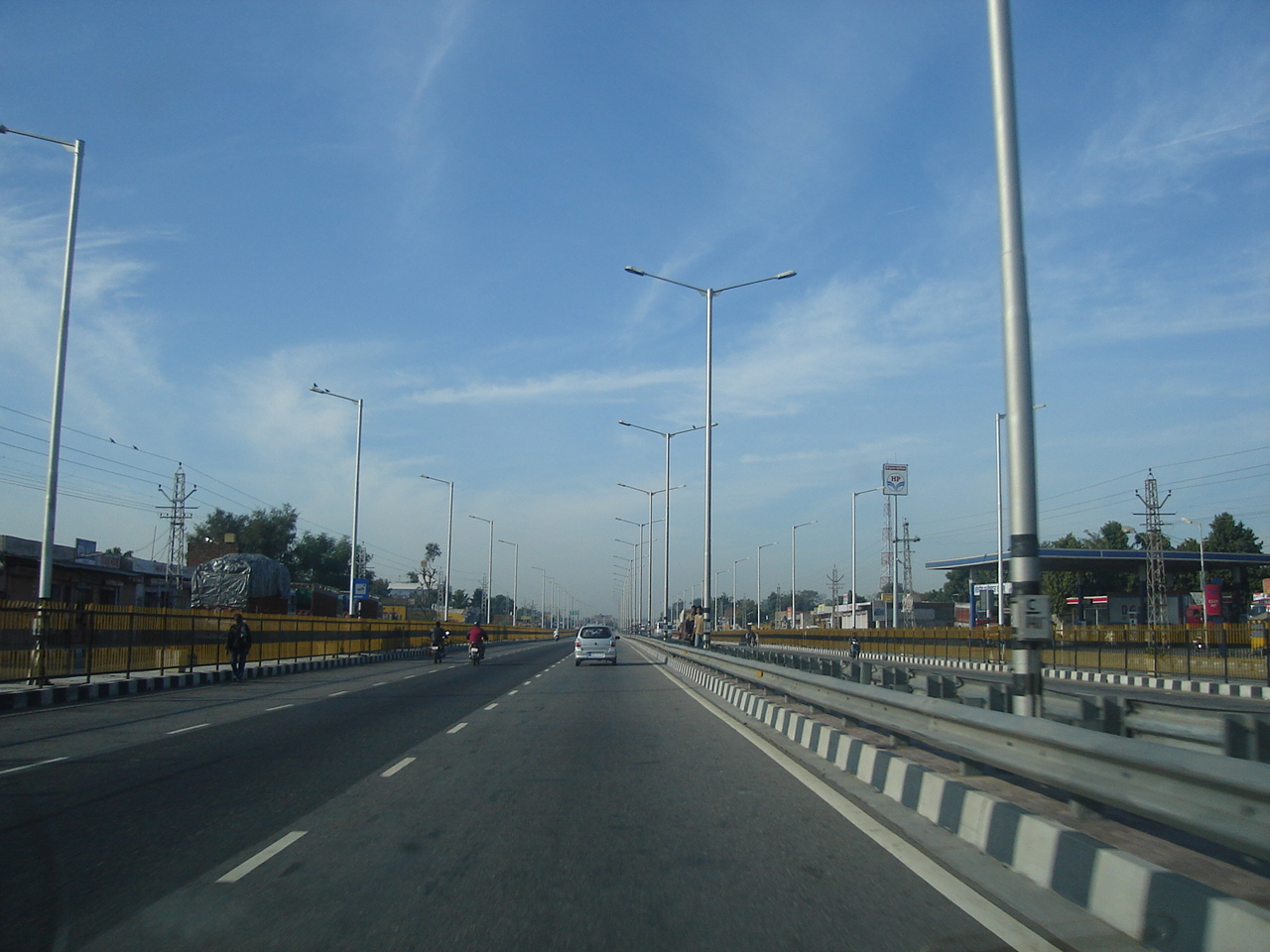
A section of National Highway 48 in Rajasthan.

Rajasthan is 12th leading investment destination in India after Maharashtra, Gujarat, Delhi, West Bengal, etc. because of its environment, law and order situation, infrastructure, investment climate and favourable population density. Areas facing NCR such as Bhiwadi are now popular with automobile and manufacturing companies. Many of the small scale suppliers and vendors have opted to shift inside Rajasthan border from Gurgaon in Haryana because of power shortage and infrastructure issues there. But persistent law and order problem in far-away industrial belt is a growing cause of concern.

Rajasthan State Industrial Development and Investment Corporation provides facilities for development. Rajasthan is now the preferred destination for IT companies, & North India's largest integrated IT park is located in Jaipur and is named as Mahindra World City Jaipur covering nearly 3,000 acres (12 km^{2}) of land. Some of the companies operating in Rajasthan include Infosys, Genpact, Wipro, Truworth, Deusche Bank, NEI, MICO, Honda Siel Cars, Coca-Cola, Gillete etc.

== Mining ==
Rajasthan is pre-eminent in quarrying and mining in India. Hindustan Zinc, headquartered in Udaipur. Kishangarh and Rajsamand also plays a vital role in economy due to the marble originated areas. Rajasthan is India's only and world's leading integrated zinc, lead and silver producer. With its large scale operations of smelting and mining in various districts of Rajasthan, the company contributed to the socio-economic development of the state. The state is the largest source of cement. Rajasthan is the largest cement-producing state of India. It has rich salt deposits at Sambhar, copper mines at Khetri and zinc mines at Dariba and Zawar. This is a chart of output of major minerals of Rajasthan.

Mineral	National Share
Wollastonite	100%
Jasper	100%
Zinc concentrate	99%
Fluorite	96%
Gypsum	93%
Marble	92%
Asbestos	89%
Soapstone	87%
Lead concentrate	80%
Phosphate rock	75%
Ball clay	71%
Calcite	70%
Sandstone	70%
Flaggy limestone	70%
Feldspar	70%

== Tourism ==
Tourism is flourishing in Rajasthan. The palaces of Jaipur, lakes of Udaipur, and desert forts of Jodhpur, Bikaner & Jaisalmer are among the most common destinations for tourists. Tourism accounts for sixteen percent of the state's domestic product. Many old and neglected palaces and forts have been converted into heritage hotels. Tourism has increased employment in the hospitality sector.

=== Handicrafts ===
A spin-off of tourism has been the growth of the handicrafts industry. Bassi and Molella villages in Chittorgarh and Rajasamand are well known for their wooden and clay handicraft items respectively. Blue pottery of Jaipur and ustta Kalan of Bikaner are also famous around the globe. Jodhpur is one of the major handicraft hubs in India, trading its handicrafts globally.
