= Mahindra World City, Jaipur =

- Integrated Business City
- Interactive map of Mahindra World City, Jaipur
- Coordinates: 26.806486°N 75.686874°E
- Inaugurated: 2007

Area
  - Total: 12 km^{2} (4.6 sq mi)
- Website: http://www.mahindraworldcity.com/jaipur/overview.aspx

Mahindra World City, Jaipur is a multi-product Special Economic Zone based on the concept of an "Integrated Business City". It comprises SEZs, Industrial Parks, and Retail and Social Infrastructure.

== History ==
In 2007, Mahindra World City, Jaipur was inaugurated by former Chief Minister of Rajasthan, Vasundhara Raje. It is a joint undertaking by Mahindra Lifespace Developers Ltd (a Mahindra Group Company) and Rajasthan State Industrial Development and Investment Corporation Ltd (RIICO), an agency of the Government of Rajasthan. It has been identified as one of the 16 projects globally by the Clinton Climate Initiative (CCI), a foundation upheld by Former US President Bill Clinton with a focus on sustainable development. 2017

== Location ==
Mahindra World City is built near NH8 (Jaipur–Ajmer highway), and spread over an area of 3000 acres. Mahindra World City is located near Jaipur City, 18 km from the airport and 21 km from the railway station. Apart from Jaipur, Mahindra World City is presently operational at Chennai, Tamil Nadu.

== Business Zone ==
The basic idea behind the development of Mahindra World City, Jaipur is to bring forth overall industrial development across different segments of the industry. The business zone is classified into a Domestic Tariff Area (DTA) for several industries and multi-product services with specific zones SEZs which include:

- IT/ITES
- Engineering and Related Industries
- Handicrafts
- Apparel
- Gems and Jewellery
- Warehousing and Logistics

Some of the prominent companies that are operational within Mahindra World City, Jaipur include Genpact, Appirio, Infosys, Wipro, ICICI Bank, Connexions, Deutsche Bank, GirnarSoft, Nagarro, Aro granite industries ltd., QH Talbros.

The Isys Softech is currently been inaugurated by Home Minister of Rajasthan Gulab Chand Kataria.

== Social Infrastructure ==
The social infrastructure in Mahindra World City Jaipur is comprehensive in terms of residential, learning, health institutes, and recreational zones. It also includes retail and hospitality centers as integral parts of the development.

== Architecture ==
The layout of Mahindra World City, Jaipur has been conceptualized and planned by Jurong Consultants of Singapore. These consultants have developed Mahindra World City as a destination conducive for international and domestic corporates.
