= Dhebar Lake =

Lake in India

Jaisamand lLake
- Jaisamand Lake
- ढेबर झील, जयसमंद झील (Hindi)
- Location within Rajasthan
- Interactive map of Jaisamand lLake
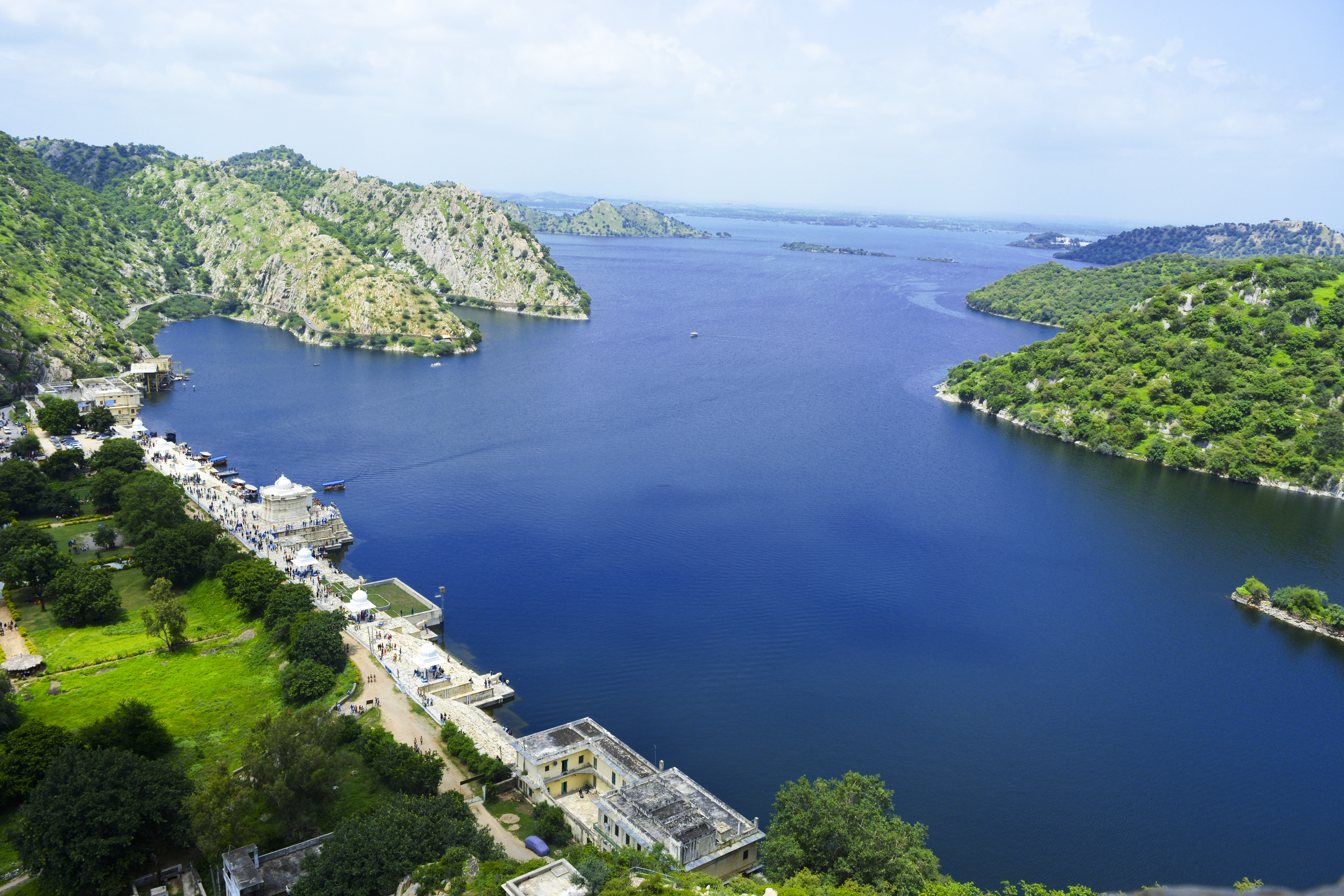
- Primary outflows: Gomati River
- Basin countries: India
- Max. length: 9 mi (14 km)
- Surface area: 87 km^{2} (34 sq mi)
- Max. depth: 160 ft (49 m)
- Shore length^{1}: 30 mi (48 km)
- Islands: 3 Islands
- ^{1} Shore length is not a well-defined measure.

Dhebar Lake (also known as Jaisamand Lake) is India's second largest artificial fresh water lake in India. It is located in the Salumber District of Rajasthan State in western India. It has an area of 87 km^{2} (34 sq mi) when full, and was created at Namla Thikana (rathore-patvi) in the 17th century, when Rana Jai Singh of Udaipur built a marble dam across the Gomati River. It is about 19 km (12 miles) from the district headquarters of Salumbar. When first built, it was the largest artificial lake in the world. The surrounding Jaisamand Wildlife Sanctuary around Dhebar Lake can be reached by the state highway to Banswara from Udaipur. Jaisamand Wildlife Sanctuary protects about 162.0 square kilometres (16,200 ha), mostly teak forest, on the shores of Dhebar Lake. The lake has three islands measuring from 10 to 40 acres (40,000 to 162,000 m^{2}) each. The Dhebar Lake Marble Dam is 300.0 m (984.3 ft) long and is a part of the "Heritage Monuments of India". The dam also has the Hawa Mahal Palace, winter capital of the erstwhile Maharanas of Mewar. 1687 to 1691. However, the lake went almost dry in recent times affecting the eco system.

== History ==
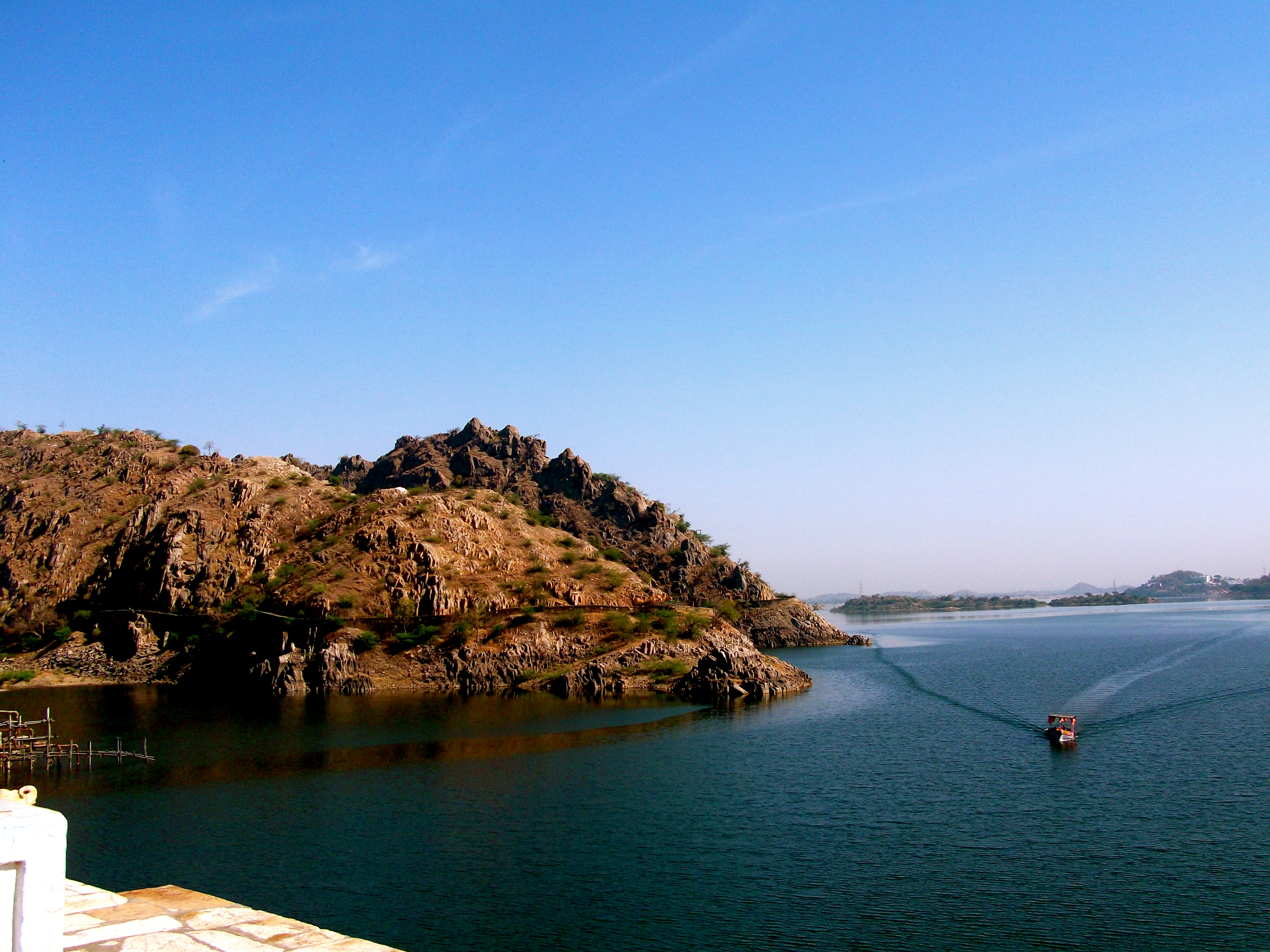
Jaisamand Lake

Dhebar Lake, built by Maharana Jai Singh in 1685, covers an area of 36 square miles (93 km^{2}). It remained the largest artificial lake in the world till the building of the Aswan Dam in Egypt by the British in 1902, that was reconstructed between 1960 and 1970. During the reign of Maharana Jai Singh (1680–1698), there was a great need for water for cultivation in Mewar's southeastern corner. The Maharana emulated his father (Maharana Raj Singh I who built Rajsamand Lake) by damming a small river, the Gomati and building a massive embankment; the height of the dam is 36.6 meters. Jai Singh named the resultant lake Jaisamand after himself - its often-used nickname is 'Ocean of Victory' ('samand' meaning 'ocean'). On the day of its inauguration, 2 June 1691, Maharana Jai Singh walked around the dam charitably distributing gold equal to his own weight. The lake is 9 miles (14 km) in breadth, 102 feet (31 m) deep at its deepest end, a circumference of 30 miles (48 km), with marble staircases leading into the water. The summer palaces of the Queens of Udaipur surround Dhebar Lake. Maharna given special thanks to Namla thikana for their special land contribution .

== Characteristics ==
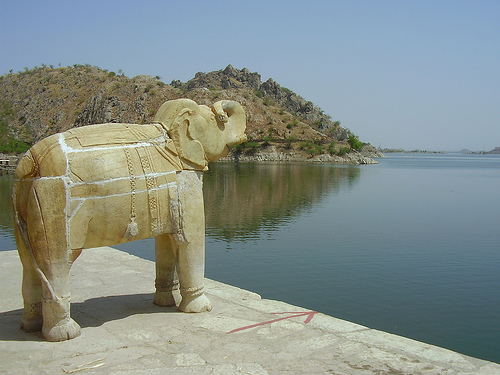
Marble Indian elephant at Jaisamand Lake

There are three islands on Dhebar Lake, and the tribe of Bhil Minas (see People of Rajasthan) inhabits all. The two bigger islands are known as Baba ka Magra and the smaller island is called Piari. There is a bund on the lake, which has to be mentioned due to its sheer size – 1,202 feet (366 m) long, 116 feet (35 m) high and 70 feet (21 m) broad at the base. On the marble dam are six exotic cenotaphs and a Shiva temple in the centre. The northern end of the lake has a palace with a courtyard while its southern end has a pavilion of 12 pillars. The hills to its south have grand palaces that have an excellent view of the lake.

Dhebar Lake has elegant steps leading to the water and marble Chhatri (cenotaphs) on its bank with a small Shiv temple that marks the grace of the lake. On either side are the palaces built for the past kings favourite queens. The local tribe "Bhils" still inhabit the islands. Maharaja Jai Singh created Dhebar Lake in the 17th century utilizing the waters of the Gomti River. Encircled by hills and with a number of summer palaces along the shore, the lake is a natural and peaceful haven. There are eleven islands on the lake, some of which provide sanctuary inhabited by several species of migratory birds. Maharana Jai Singh at the time of digging the foundation for Dhebar Lake, celebrated the occasion by giving away gold in charity after a Tuladaan Ceremony. In the lake there are three islands whose inhabitants use Bhels (boats) to reach the shore. On the top of two nearby hillocks are two old palaces constructed by Maharana Jai Singh still exist in great condition. A very fine view of the lake is available from these Great Palaces. Graceful marble chhatris flank the embankment and beautiful summer palaces of the Udaipur queens.

== Jaisamand Wildlife Sanctuary ==
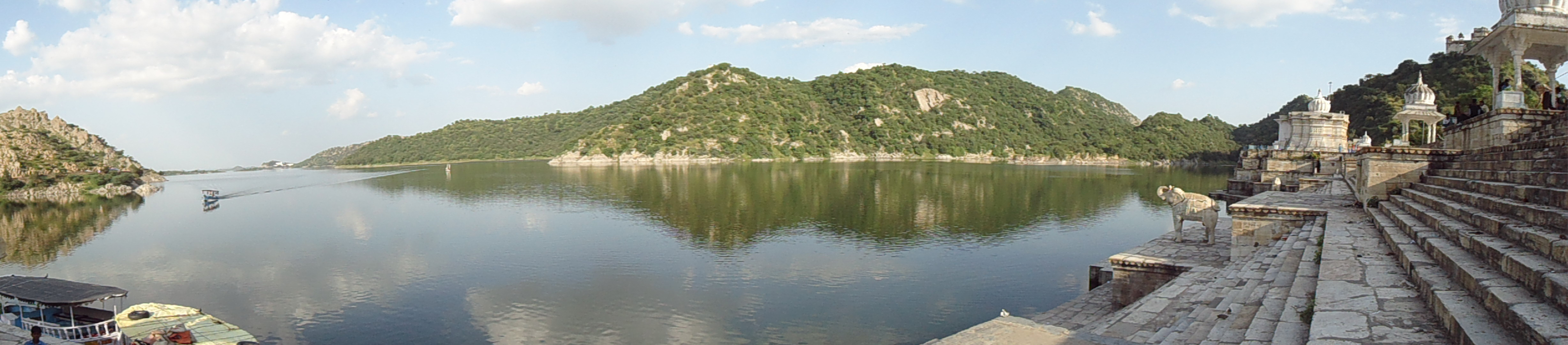
Jaisamand Lake's view

A trip to Jaisamand Wildlife Sanctuary allows a close encounter with the rich wildlife in their natural habitat. The fauna include the panther, wild boar, deer, four-horned antelope, mongoose and various species of migratory birds. The sanctuary's ecoregion is that of Khathiar-Gir dry deciduous forests.

== See also ==
- Arid Forest Research Institute
- List of lakes in India
- Wildlife of India
