= Anokhi Museum of Hand Printing =

Museum in Amber, India

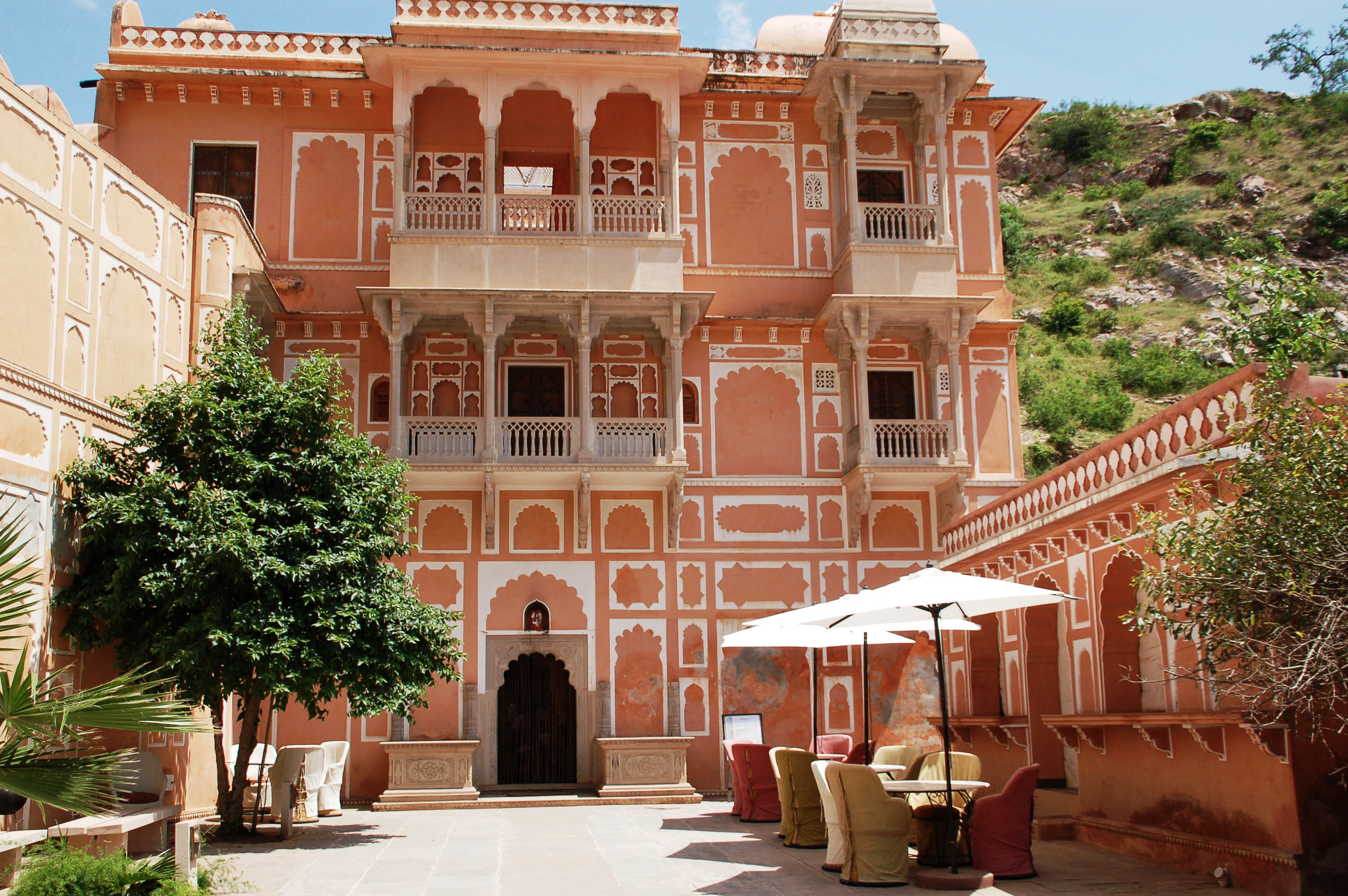
- Facade of the museum building
- Established: 2005
- Location: Amber, Rajasthan, India
- Coordinates: 26.99267°N 75.85079°E
- Website: www.anokhimuseum.com

The Anokhi Museum of Hand Printing is a private museum located in Amber, Rajasthan dedicated to the art of hand-block printing. Opened in 2005, the museum is an initiative of the founders of Anokhi, an Indian retail brand of block-printed clothes.

The museum was conceived by Rachel Bracken-Singh and her husband, Pritam Singh. It intends to preserve the traditional crafts, provide a tactile experience of learning about the technique of block-printing craft, and its rich history. The museum showcases a wide range of collections ranging from textiles, tools to equipment, etc.

== Background ==
The museum is situated in the Anokhi Haveli, a 16th-century mansion located near Amber Fort. The mansion previously known as the Chanwar Palkiwalon ki Haveli was bought in a dilapidated condition by Pritam Singh's father, John Singh, towards the end of 1970s. It was renovated over a period of three years from 1989 onwards. The building received UNESCO's Cultural Heritage Conservation Award in 2000 for its sustainable process of renovation. The restoration process took place under the guidance of architects Nimish Patel and Parul Zaveri of Abhikram. Whereas, the interior of the museum was designed by French architect Stephane Paumier.

Rachel and Pritam decided to dedicate the space to showcase block printing. Storage facilities were improved to house the Anokhi Archives. After the revamp was completed, the opening exhibition on Print Progress - Innovation & Revival 1970-2005 was organised. Today, the museum is spread over three floors of the mansion, which showcases the history, processes, and styles of hand-block printing. Rachel highlights,"Until the museum opened there was no simple way for people to observe a block printer or carver at work."

== Collections ==
The museum has a diverse range of collections which opens with the history of the craft. Further, it displays varieties of contemporary clothing materials ranging from rare traditional dresses to innovative designs created by the artisans. Anokhi Archives showcases a collection of clothing and home furnishings dating back to the 1970s. Textile traditions exhibited here include the village outfits from Balota, Rajasthan, to the Ajrakh dying technique that is displayed in a glass case documenting the 14 steps followed in this printing-dyeing process from Gujarat. Bakst: A Design Inspiration, designed for the museum's inauguration in 2005, illustrates the cross-cultural exchange between Indian artisans and Russian avant-garde designer Leon Bakst. Coats and jackets, bichaunis or bedcovers, and tools used in the craft like wooden and iron blocks, chisels, drills, etc., also form an important part of the collection.
