= Group Landmark =

Indian automotive retail company

- Type: Public
- Traded as: NSE: LANDMARK; BSE: 543714
- Industry: Automotive
- Founded: 1998
- Founder: Sanjay Thakker
- Headquarters: Ahmedabad, Gujarat, India
- Number of locations: 100+ automotive outlets
- Area served: India
- Key people: Sanjay Thakker (Chairman and Executive Director)
- Brands: Mercedes-Benz, Honda, Jeep, Volkswagen, Renault, BYD Auto, MG Motor India, Kia India
- Revenue: ₹4,025 crore (FY2025)
- Number of employees: 5,000 (2025)
- Divisions: Landmark Cars Limited
- Website: www.grouplandmark.in

Group Landmark is an automotive retail company headquartered in Ahmedabad, Gujarat. The company operates dealerships for multiple automobile brands across India. In 2024, it was featured in Fortune India's Next 500 India ranking.

As of 2026, Group Landmark operates more than 100 automotive facilities across India.

== History ==
Group Landmark was founded in 1998 by Sanjay Thakker, who opened the first Honda dealership in Ahmedabad. Over the following two decades it expanded across additional vehicle brands and cities. The current listed entity Landmark Cars Limited was incorporated in 2006.

In December 2022 the company completed its initial public offering of approximately ₹150 crore and an offer for sale of approximately ₹402 crore aggregating to about ₹552 crore. The company's shares were listed on the National Stock Exchange and the Bombay Stock Exchange on 23 December 2022.

== See also ==
- Jubilant Bhartia Group
