= Anokhi =

Indian retailer specializing in hand-block prints

- Company type: Private/Community owned
- Industry: Textiles, Home furnishings, handloom apparel, jewellery
- Founded: 1970
- Founder: John and Faith Singh
- Headquarters: Jaipur, India
- Key people: Pritam Singh (managing director); Rachel Bracken Singh (design director) Harsh Madhok (Finance/IT director & CFO) Kavita Madhok ( Operations director) Kalyan Singh (director)
- Website: www.anokhi.com

Anokhi (Hindi for "remarkable" or "unique") is an Indian retailer based in Jaipur, Rajasthan, which retails textiles, clothing, furnishings, and accessories, made with traditional Indian motifs and techniques. It was founded in 1970 by husband and wife, John and Faith Singh, with a focus on reviving traditional Rajasthani hand-block or woodcut printing techniques, and the use of natural vegetable dyes. Anokhi works directly with Rajasthani craftspeople, and retails through its 25 stores in India and a few stockists in Europe and the United States.

== History ==
Anokhi was founded by John and Faith Singh in 1970, to create contemporary products that incorporated traditional Indian techniques. Anokhi's focus was on reviving the hand-block printing techniques of Rajasthani craftspeople in an era of mass-produced clothing.

== Operations ==
Anokhi works directly with artisans who live in villages around Jaipur. The designs are made in-house and are then delivered, along with fabrics, dyes, and woodblocks, to the artisans who finish the prints in their homes. As block-printing has been traditionally practised by males, Anokhi involves rural women by commissioning their work in areas such as embroidery, appliqué, beadwork and patchwork; to encourage women in villages to seek employment, Anokhi runs a daycare centre at the manufacturing plant and provides educational support for their children.

== Anokhi Museum of Hand Printing ==
The company also runs the Anokhi Museum of Hand Printing in Jaipur, which was reported in The New York Times to be the only museum in India dedicated to the art of hand-block printing. The museum is located in a restored haveli whose restoration work was awarded the UNESCO Heritage Award for Cultural Conservation in 2000.

== Bibliography ==
- Littrell, Mary; Dickson, Marsha (2012). Artisans and Fair Trade: Crafting Development. Kumarian Press. ISBN 9781565493780.
