= Loarki language =

Rajasthani language spoken in South Asia

Loarki
- Gade Lohar
- Native to: Pakistan, India
- Region: Sindh, Rajasthan
- Ethnicity: Gadia Lohar
- Native speakers: (520,000 cited 1998–2016)
- Language family: Indo-European: Indo-Iranian; Indo-Aryan; Western; Rajasthani; Loarki

Language codes
- ISO 639-3: Either: lrk – Loarki gda – Gade Lohar (duplicate code)
- Glottolog: gade1236

Loharki (as known in Pakistan), or Gade Lohar (as known in India), is a Rajasthani language spoken by 20,000 nomadic people in rural Sindh, Pakistan, and by 500,000 in Rajasthan, India.
