= Rajasthan Khadi and Village Industries Board =

Rajasthan Khadi and Village Industries Board is an agency of Government of Rajasthan set up in 1955 for assisting and encouraging Khadi and village industries in Rajasthan.

General Secretary Rajasthan
Year	Name
2020	Shri Gopal Ram Kumawat

== Khadi history ==
Mahatma Gandhi began promoting the spinning of Khadi for rural self-employment in 1920s in India. He also wanted to spread the message of not using foreign clothes. The freedom struggle revolved around the use of Khadi fabrics and the dumping of foreign-made clothes. Thus it symbolized the political ideas and independence itself, and to this day most politicians in India are seen only in Khadi clothing. The flag of India is technically only allowed to be made from this material.
