= Rural Non Farm Development Agency =

Rural Non Farm Development Agency (RUDA) is an agency of the Government of Rajasthan established in 1995 to promote the Rural Non-Farm Sector (RNFS) in Rajasthan state. It promotes sustainable rural livelihoods in the rural non farm sector.
