= List of Rajasthan Royals cricketers =

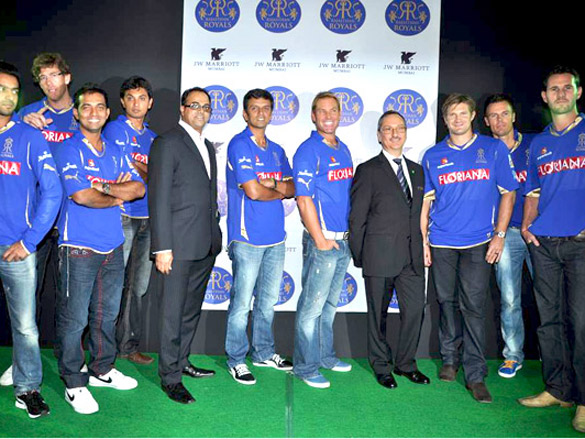
RR players during a party at Shilpa Shetty's house

Rajasthan Royals (RR) is a franchise cricket team based in Jaipur, India, and is one of the teams participating in the Indian Premier League (IPL). It played its first Twenty20 match in the first season of the IPL against the Delhi Daredevils. It later topped the group stage in that season, and won the final against the Chennai Super Kings to become the first winner of the IPL. It also reached the playoffs in the 2013 IPL. The team's performance in the 2008 and the 2013 season resulted in its qualification for the 2008 and the 2013 Champions League Twenty20 (CLT20); however, the 2008 edition was cancelled due to the 2008 Mumbai attacks. The RR reached the finals in the 2013 CLT20, but lost the match to Mumbai Indians. Seventy-three players have played for RR, of whom Sanju Samson has played the most matches.

Shane Watson is the only player to lead most runs, most wickets, highest score, highest batting average, most sixes, most matches for a team. Also the only player to win man of the tournament IPL twice. The best bowling average is Lee Carseldine's 6.00, though among bowlers who have bowled more than 20 overs, Sohail Tanvir has the best average: 11.44. Tanvir also has the best bowling figures in an innings: he claimed six wickets against Chennai Super Kings in a 2008 match, while conceding 14 runs. Mahesh Rawat has taken the most catches as wicket-keeper for RR, with 15, while Naman Ojha has made the highest number of stumpings: 7; Dishant Yagnik has made the most dismissals as wicket-keeper for RR with 18. Rahane has claimed the highest number of catches among fielders, with 28.

The first list includes all players who have played at least one match for RR and is initially listed alphabetically by their last name. (Note: Sorting as such may actually be considered incorrect, especially for players such as Mohammad Kaif, where their last name is used in a different manner to that of western names, but are listed as such for continuity with other lists and ease of understanding the page.) The second list comprises all those players who have captained the team in at least one match, arranged in the order of the first match as captain. Many players have also represented other teams of the IPL, but only the records of their games for RR are given. (Note: To sort these tables by any statistic, click on the icon in the column title.) (Note: These statistics are correct as of 2014 Indian Premier League.)

== Key ==
General

- § – Member of the current squad
- † – Captain
- ‡ – Wicket-keeper
- First – Year of Twenty20 debut for RR
- Last – Year of latest Twenty20 match for RR
- Mat – Number of matches played

Fielding

- Ca – Catches taken
- St – Stumpings effected

Batting

- Inn – Number of innings batted
- NO – Number of innings not out
- Runs – Runs scored in career
- HS – Highest score
- 100 – Centuries scored
- 50 – Half-centuries scored (Note: A century made is not listed as an additional half century.)
- Avg – Runs scored per dismissal
- * – Batsman remained not out

Bowling

- Balls – Balls bowled in career (Note: This does not include illegal deliveries like no-balls and wides.)
- Wkt – Wickets taken in career
- BBI – Best bowling in an innings (Note: The BBI has not been provided for those bowlers who have not taken any wicket while playing for RR.)
- ER - Average number of runs conceded per over (Note: Average runs concede by bowlers while playing for RR.)
- Ave – Average runs per wicket
- SR - Batsman scoring rate

Captains

- Won – Number of games won
- Lost – Number of games lost
- NR – Number of games with no result
- Win% – Percentage of games won to those captained (Note: The Win–loss percentage is calculated using the formula: $\frac{Wins+\frac{1}{2}Ties}{Games}$)

== Players ==
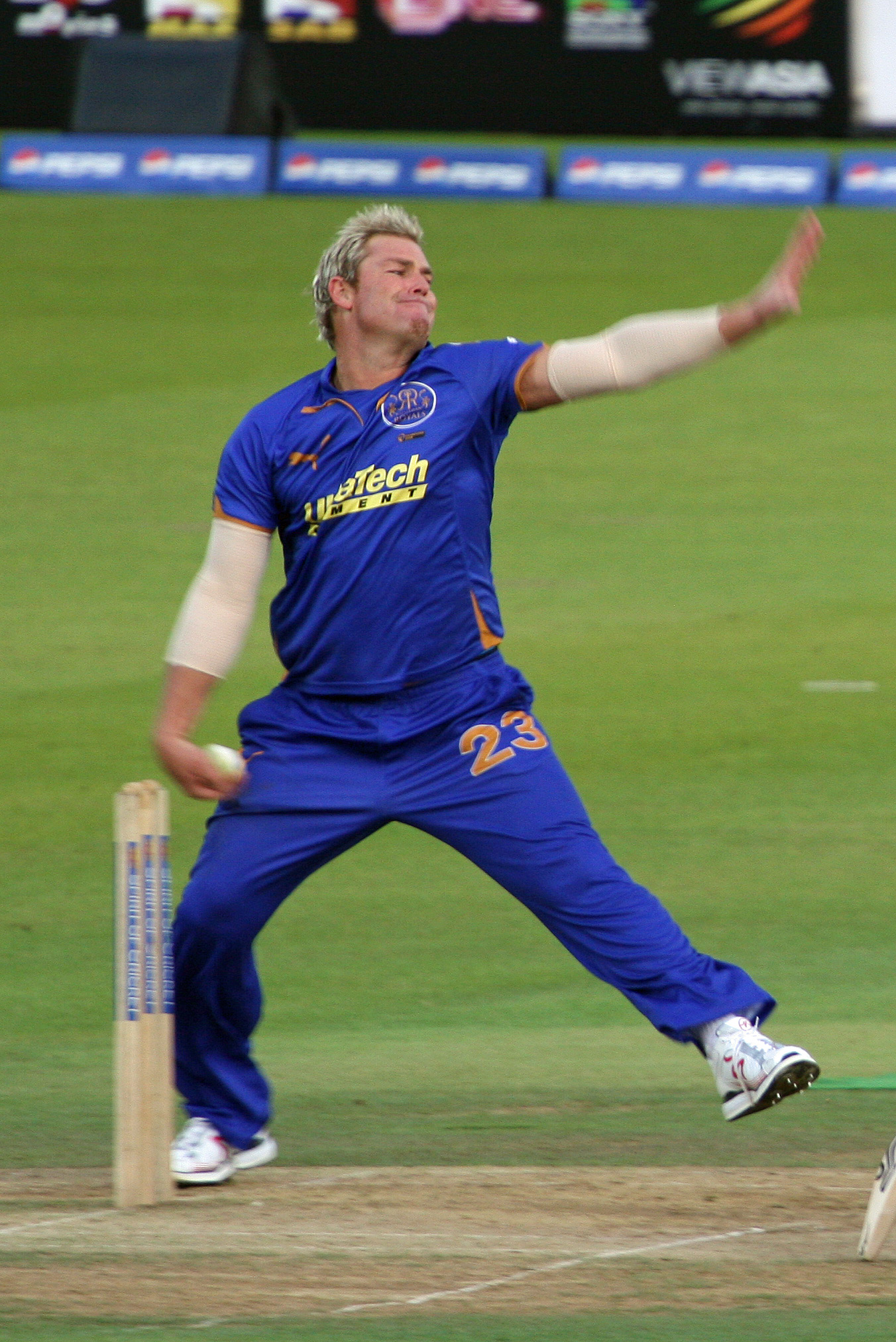
Shane Warne has 16 wickets for RR at a bowling average of 25.38 in inaugural edition of IPL.

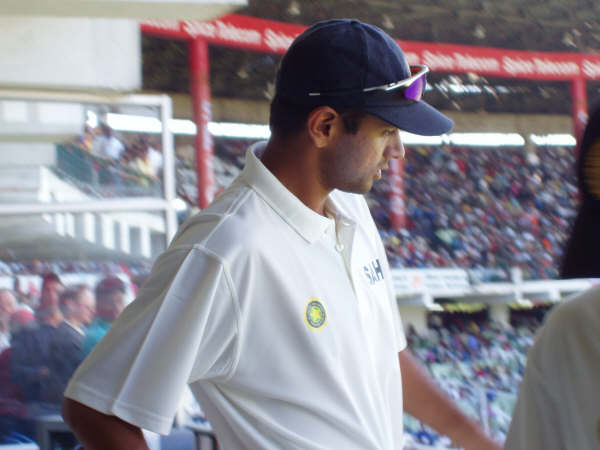
Rahul Dravid has made seven half-centuries for RR, with a high score of 66.

RR cricketers
General						Batting								Bowling					Fielding	
No.	Name	Nationality (Note: The information in the nationality column is according to ESPNcricinfo. This information may not necessarily reflect the player's birthplace or citizenship.)	First	Last	Mat	Inn	NO	Runs	HS	100	50	Avg	SR	Balls	Wkt	BBI	ER	Ave	Ca	St
1	Kamran Akmal ‡	Pakistan	2008	2008	6	6	1	128	53*	0	1	25.60	164.10	0	–	–	–	–	5	4
2	Dinesh Salunkhe	India	2008	2008	6	3	1	33	26*	0	0	16.50	137.50	48	1	1/21	9.75	78.00	2	0
3	Younis Khan	Pakistan	2008	2008	1	1	0	3	3	0	0	3.00	42.86	0	–	–	–	–	1	0
4	Mohammad Kaif	India	2008	2008	16	14	3	176	34	0	0	16.00	103.60	0	-	-	–	-	8	0
5	Taruwar Kohli	India	2008	2008	2	2	0	10	7	0	0	5.00	66.67	0	–	–	–	–	1	0
6	Darren Lehmann	Australia	2008	2008	2	2	0	18	17	0	0	9.00	100.00	0	–	–	–	–	0	0
7	Sohail Tanvir	Pakistan	2008	2008	11	5	2	36	13	0	0	12.00	124.14	247	22	6/14	6.46	12.09	4	0
8	Mahesh Rawat ‡	India	2008	2009	16	10	6	50	23*	0	0	12.50	86.21	0	–	–	–	–	15	1
9	Ravindra Jadeja §	India	2008	2026	38	30	8	620	45	0	0	28.18	121.33	327	14	3/15	7.63	29.71	12	0
10	Niraj Patel	India	2008	2009	9	6	2	121	57	0	1	30.25	101.68	6	0	0/6	6.00	–	6	0
11	Graeme Smith	South Africa	2008	2010	25	25	3	697	91	0	4	31.68	112.97	0	-	-	-	-	6	0
12	Yusuf Pathan	India	2008	2010	43	42	4	1011	100	1	6	26.61	161.24	583	20	3/22	7.40	35.95	14	0
13	Dimitri Mascarenhas	England	2008	2010	8	7	1	60	27	0	0	10.00	105.26	188	12	3/20	7.21	18.83	1	0
14	Munaf Patel	India	2008	2010	30	9	5	37	23*	0	0	9.25	115.63	617	33	3/17	7.58	23.61	7	0
15	Swapnil Asnodkar	India	2008	2011	20	20	0	423	60	0	2	21.15	124.78	0	–	–	–	–	6	0
16	Shane Warne †	Australia	2008	2011	55	29	9	198	34*	0	0	9.90	92.52	1194	57	4/21	7.27	25.39	16	0
17	Pankaj Singh	India	2008	2012	12	2	2	5	4*	0	0	–	62.50	210	7	2/18	9.20	46.00	1	0
18	Siddharth Trivedi	India	2008	2013	76	15	8	42	9	0	0	6.00	71.19	1506	65	4/25	7.59	29.29	14	0
19	Shane Watson †	Australia	2008	2015	84	81	12	2474	104*	2	14	35.85	140.16	1481	67	3/10	7.55	27.83	22	0
20	Siddharth Chitnis	India	2009	2009	1	1	0	6	6	0	0	6.00	75.00	0	-	-	-	-	0	0
21	Rob Quiney	Australia	2009	2009	7	7	0	103	51	0	1	14.71	100.98	0	–	–	–	–	1	0
22	Paul Valthaty	India	2009	2009	2	2	0	6	5	0	0	3.00	50.00	0	–	–	–	–	0	0
23	Lee Carseldine	Australia	2009	2009	5	5	1	81	39	0	0	20.25	119.12	6	1	1/6	6.00	6.00	4	0
24	Shane Harwood	Australia	2009	2009	3	2	2	9	6*	0	0	–	64.29	60	3	2/25	7.30	24.33	2	0
25	Tyron Henderson	South Africa	2009	2009	2	2	0	11	11	0	0	5.50	68.75	36	1	1/30	6.67	40.00	0	0
26	Morne Morkel	South Africa	2009	2010	4	3	1	17	8	0	0	8.50	70.83	84	0	0/20	7.57	–	2	0
27	Naman Ojha ‡	India	2009	2010	22	22	3	545	94*	0	4	28.68	127.04	0	–	–	–	–	6	6
28	Kamran Khan	India	2009	2010	8	2	1	3	3	0	0	3.00	60.00	142	9	3/18	7.48	19.67	4	0
29	Abhishek Raut	India	2009	2011	22	16	7	194	36*	0	0	21.56	116.17	24	0	0/6	9.50	–	9	0
30	Johan Botha	South Africa	2009	2012	24	19	8	355	67*	0	1	30.45	114.73	534	19	3/6	6.85	32.11	9	0
31	Amit Singh	India	2009	2012	23	5	1	2	1*	0	0	0.50	20.00	473	28	4/19	7.86	22.14	1	0
32	Michael Lumb	England	2010	2010	12	12	0	278	83	0	1	25.27	144.79	0	–	–	–	–	4	0
33	Adam Voges	Australia	2010	2010	9	7	3	181	45*	0	0	45.25	126.57	54	0	0/5	8.44	–	1	0
34	Damien Martyn	Australia	2010	2010	1	1	0	19	19	0	0	19.00	79.17	0	–	–	–	–	0	0
35	Paras Dogra	India	2010	2010	9	8	0	107	41	0	0	13.38	100.94	0	–	–	–	–	1	0
36	Abhishek Jhunjhunwala	India	2010	2010	13	11	2	183	53*	0	1	20.33	110.24	37	0	0/2	11.19	–	4	0
37	Aaron Finch	Australia	2010	2010	1	1	0	21	21	0	0	21.00	100.00	7	0	0/5	4.29	–	0	0
38	Shrikant Wagh	India	2010	2010	1	0	0	–	–	0	0	–	–	6	1	1/16	16.00	16.00	0	0
39	Sumit Narwal	India	2010	2010	5	3	1	14	12	0	0	7.00	116.67	94	5	3/36	11.81	37.00	1	0
40	Aditya Dole	India	2010	2010	3	2	0	34	30	0	0	17.00	154.55	66	5	2/36	10.18	22.40	2	0
41	Amit Uniyal	India	2010	2010	2	2	1	4	4*	0	0	4.00	57.14	36	2	2/41	11.00	33.00	0	0
42	Amit Paunikar ‡	India	2010	2011	5	5	0	49	20	0	0	9.80	84.48	0	–	–	–	–	1	0
43	Faiz Fazal	India	2010	2011	12	11	1	183	45	0	0	18.30	105.78	12	0	0/6	10.00	–	6	0
44	Shaun Tait	Australia	2010	2013	21	5	2	23	11	0	0	7.67	88.46	473	23	3/13	8.12	27.83	6	0
45	Pinal Shah ‡	India	2011	2011	2	1	0	5	5	0	0	5.00	100.00	0	–	–	–	–	0	1
46	Ross Taylor	New Zealand	2011	2011	12	11	6	181	47*	0	0	36.20	119.08	6	0	0/11	11.00	–	4	0
47	Jacob Oram	New Zealand	2011	2011	2	1	0	0	0	0	0	0.00	0.00	24	1	1/32	11.25	45.00	0	0
48	Nayan Doshi	England	2011	2011	3	1	0	0	0	0	0	0.00	0.00	32	1	1/15	11.63	62.00	0	0
49	Rahul Dravid †	India	2011	2013	52	51	2	1324	66	0	7	27.02	108.88	0	–	–	–	–	11	0
50	Ankeet Chavan	India	2011	2013	13	3	1	12	7*	0	0	6.00	109.09	248	8	2/23	7.89	40.75	3	0
51	Ashok Menaria	India	2011	2013	33	24	3	407	40	0	0	19.38	111.81	140	3	2/20	7.41	57.66	6	0
52	Dishant Yagnik ‡	India	2011	2014	27	19	7	176	34	0	0	14.66	123.07	0	–	–	–	–	13	6
53	Ajinkya Rahane †	India	2011	2019	106	99	12	3098	105*	2	21	35.60	122.30	0	–	–	–	–	40	0
54	Stuart Binny	India	2011	2019	78	59	19	812	48*	0	0	20.30	132.67	492	18	2/14	7.56	34.44	18	0
55	Shreevats Goswami ‡	India	2012	2012	11	6	1	69	24	0	0	13.80	102.99	0	–	–	–	–	4	4
56	Owais Shah	England	2012	2013	15	15	4	365	76	0	3	33.18	130.82	0	–	–	–	–	5	0
57	Ajit Chandila	India	2012	2013	12	2	2	4	4*	0	0	–	57.14	234	11	4/13	6.21	22.00	7	0
58	Brad Hogg	Australia	2012	2013	10	3	1	15	13	0	0	7.50	93.75	236	10	2/31	7.22	28.40	1	0
59	Brad Hodge	Australia	2012	2014	38	33	14	748	54*	0	1	39.36	143.84	18	1	1/13	8.00	24.00	16	0
60	Kevon Cooper	West Indies	2012	2014	31	17	6	142	32	0	0	12.90	175.30	714	39	4/18	8.05	24.58	13	0
61	S. Sreesanth	India	2013	2013	7	3	2	1	1*	0	0	1.00	25.00	130	5	2/20	7.52	27.35	11	0
62	Kusal Perera	Sri Lanka	2013	2013	3	3	0	22	14	0	0	7.33	129.41	0	–	–	–	–	0	0
63	Sachin Baby	India	2013	2013	4	1	0	3	3	0	0	3.00	42.86	0	–	–	–	–	2	0
64	Harmeet Singh	United States	2013	2013	1	0	0	–	–	0	0	–	–	24	1	1/34	8.50	34.00	0	0
65	Rahul Shukla	India	2013	2013	7	3	2	2	1*	0	0	2.00	50.00	126	8	3/23	8.47	22.55	3	0
66	Samuel Badree	West Indies	2013	2013	1	0	0	–	–	0	0	–	–	24	0	0/34	8.50	–	0	0
67	Vikramjeet Malik	India	2013	2014	7	1	1	1	1*	0	0	–	50.00	132	8	3/24	7.27	20.00	2	0
68	James Faulkner	Australia	2013	2015	48	35	16	387	46	0	0	20.36	143.86	1051	53	5/16	8.28	27.37	11	0
69	Pravin Tambe	India	2013	2015	31	6	4	11	3*	0	0	5.50	55.00	678	35	4/15	6.97	22.51	4	0
70	Sanju Samson ‡ †	India	2013	2025	155	150	18	4219	119	2	26	31.96	140.53	0	–	–	–	–	84	17
71	Unmukt Chand	India	2014	2014	1	1	0	2	2	0	0	2.00	22.22	0	–	–	–	–	0	0
72	Abhishek Nayar	India	2014	2014	5	4	1	43	23	0	0	14.33	91.49	0	–	–	–	–	0	0
73	Ben Cutting	Australia	2014	2014	1	1	0	8	8	0	0	8.00	133.33	24	1	1/31	7.75	31.00	1	0
74	Iqbal Abdullah	India	2014	2014	1	0	0	–	–	0	0	–	–	12	0	0/17	8.50	–	1	0
75	Kane Richardson	Australia	2014	2014	7	1	0	1	1	0	0	1.00	50.00	162	9	2/18	7.63	22.89	3	0
76	Rajat Bhatia	India	2014	2015	14	8	2	67	23	0	0	11.17	124.07	258	12	3/23	7.65	27.42	5	0
77	Tim Southee	New Zealand	2014	2015	10	4	2	17	7*	0	0	8.50	130.77	228	6	2/32	8.50	53.83	6	0
78	Ankit Sharma	India	2014	2018	8	4	1	41	30	0	0	13.67	113.89	138	7	2/20	7.30	24.00	2	0
79	Dhawal Kulkarni	India	2014	2019	37	7	4	50	28*	0	0	16.67	108.70	701	29	2/9	8.74	35.21	13	0
80	Steve Smith †	Australia	2014	2020	50	43	8	1070	79*	0	8	30.57	126.93	0	–	–	–	–	21	0
81	Rahul Tewatia	India	2014	2021	32	23	6	426	53	0	1	25.06	124.20	570	21	3/25	7.96	36.00	11	0
82	Karun Nair	India	2014	2022	28	25	2	527	73*	0	4	22.91	133.42	0	–	–	–	–	8	0
83	Deepak Hooda	India	2015	2015	14	9	0	151	54	0	1	16.78	158.95	91	1	1/35	8.51	129.00	1	0
84	Barinder Sran	India	2015	2015	1	0	0	–	–	0	0	–	–	18	0	0/35	11.67	–	0	0
85	Rusty Theron	United States	2015	2015	1	1	1	1	1*	0	0	–	100.00	24	1	1/40	10.00	40.00	0	0
86	Chris Morris	South Africa	2015	2021	22	14	7	143	36*	0	0	20.43	150.53	498	28	4/23	8.28	24.54	7	0
87	Heinrich Klaasen ‡	South Africa	2018	2018	4	4	1	57	32	0	0	19.00	121.28	0	–	–	–	–	3	4
88	D'Arcy Short	Australia	2018	2018	7	7	0	115	44	0	0	16.43	116.16	18	1	1/10	6.33	19.00	2	0
89	Anureet Singh	India	2018	2018	3	1	1	3	3*	0	0	–	75.00	24	1	1/20	10.50	42.00	1	0
90	Ben Laughlin	Australia	2018	2018	7	2	1	1	1*	0	0	1.00	25.00	125	9	2/15	10.13	23.44	1	0
91	Prashant Chopra	India	2018	2019	2	1	0	8	8	0	0	8.00	133.33	0	–	–	–	–	0	0
92	Rahul Tripathi	India	2018	2019	20	19	4	367	80*	0	2	24.47	128.77	0	–	–	–	–	7	0
93	Krishnappa Gowtham	India	2018	2019	22	17	5	144	33*	0	0	12.00	173.49	360	12	2/12	7.97	39.83	10	0
94	Shreyas Gopal	India	2018	2021	42	18	6	157	24	0	0	13.08	116.30	810	41	4/16	8.09	26.63	10	0
95	Mahipal Lomror	India	2018	2021	32	27	5	452	54*	0	1	20.55	119.87	84	1	1/22	7.40	109.00	7	0
96	Ben Stokes	England	2018	2021	31	31	5	604	107*	1	1	23.23	130.45	419	16	3/15	9.42	41.13	16	0
97	Jaydev Unadkat	India	2018	2021	39	15	7	100	26	0	0	12.50	120.48	802	29	3/15	9.58	44.17	11	0
98	Jos Buttler ‡	England	2018	2024	83	82	9	3055	124	7	18	41.85	147.80	0	–	–	–	–	47	1
99	Jofra Archer §	England	2018	2026	58	36	14	277	30	0	0	12.59	142.05	1338	72	3/15	7.97	24.68	15	0
100	Sudhesan Midhun	India	2019	2019	1	0	0	–	–	0	0	–	–	12	0	0/27	13.50	–	1	0
101	Ish Sodhi	New Zealand	2019	2019	8	2	0	7	6	0	0	3.50	41.18	181	9	3/26	6.70	22.44	0	0
102	Ashton Turner	Australia	2019	2019	4	3	1	3	3*	0	0	1.50	30.00	0	–	–	–	–	0	0
103	Oshane Thomas	West Indies	2019	2019	4	0	0	–	–	0	0	–	–	60	5	2/6	7.90	15.80	1	0
104	Varun Aaron	India	2019	2020	8	3	2	4	3*	0	0	4.00	23.53	120	4	2/20	10.50	52.50	1	0
105	Riyan Parag § †	India	2019	2026	94	82	13	1773	84*	0	8	25.70	142.07	319	9	1/5	9.69	57.22	49	0
106	Robin Uthappa	India	2020	2020	12	12	0	196	41	0	0	16.33	119.51	0	–	–	–	–	3	0
107	Tom Curran	England	2020	2020	5	4	3	83	83*	0	1	83.00	133.87	109	3	1/37	11.45	69.33	1	0
108	Ankit Rajpoot	India	2020	2020	6	2	1	9	7*	0	0	9.00	90.00	102	2	1/39	11.71	99.50	0	0
109	Andrew Tye	Australia	2020	2020	1	1	0	6	6	0	0	6.00	100.00	24	1	1/50	12.50	50.00	0	0
110	David Miller	South Africa	2020	2021	10	9	3	124	62	0	1	20.67	109.73	0	–	–	–	–	4	0
111	Kartik Tyagi	India	2020	2021	14	5	3	6	6	0	0	3.00	60.00	313	13	1/29	9.41	37.77	3	0
112	Yashasvi Jaiswal § †	India	2020	2026	78	77	5	2481	124	2	18	34.46	153.43	7	0	0/6	14.57	–	30	0
113	Manan Vohra	India	2021	2021	4	4	0	42	14	0	0	10.50	107.69	0	–	–	–	–	0	0
114	Anuj Rawat ‡	India	2021	2021	2	1	0	–	–	0	0	–	0.00	0	–	–	–	–	3	0
115	Akash Singh	India	2021	2021	1	0	0	–	–	0	0	–	0.00	24	0	0/39	9.75	–	0	0
116	Mayank Markande	India	2021	2021	1	0	0	–	–	0	0	–	–	18	0	0/26	8.67	–	0	0
117	Evin Lewis	West Indies	2021	2021	5	5	0	151	58	0	1	30.20	162.37	0	–	–	–	–	0	0
118	Shivam Dube	India	2021	2021	9	9	1	230	64*	0	1	28.75	119.17	30	0	0/5	9.80	–	2	0
119	Glenn Phillips	New Zealand	2021	2021	3	3	1	26	14*	0	0	13.00	78.79	12	1	1/17	10.00	20.00	1	0
120	Mustafizur Rahman	Bangladesh	2021	2021	14	5	5	8	8*	0	0	–	57.14	311	14	3/20	8.41	31.14	1	0
121	Chetan Sakariya	India	2021	2021	14	6	1	16	7	0	0	3.20	64.00	312	14	3/31	8.19	30.43	4	0
122	Tabraiz Shamsi	South Africa	2021	2021	1	1	1	2	2*	0	0	–	50.00	24	0	0/34	8.50	–	0	0
123	Kuldip Yadav	India	2021	2023	3	1	1	0	0*	0	0	–	0.00	54	2	1/18	9.33	42.00	0	0
124	Rassie van der Dussen	South Africa	2022	2022	3	3	1	22	12*	0	0	11.00	91.67	0	–	–	–	–	0	0
125	Daryl Mitchell	New Zealand	2022	2022	2	2	0	33	17	0	0	16.50	75.00	12	0	0/7	13.50	–	2	0
126	James Neesham	New Zealand	2022	2022	2	2	0	31	17	0	0	15.50	114.81	18	0	0/29	9.67	–	1	0
127	Nathan Coulter-Nile	Australia	2022	2022	1	1	1	1	1*	0	0	–	50.00	18	0	0/48	16.00	–	0	0
128	Prasidh Krishna	India	2022	2022	17	3	2	6	4*	0	0	6.00	50.00	399	19	3/22	8.29	29.00	2	0
129	Devdutt Padikkal	India	2022	2023	28	28	1	637	54	0	3	23.59	125.89	0	–	–	–	–	7	0
130	Obed McCoy	West Indies	2022	2023	8	1	0	8	8	0	0	8.00	160.00	161	11	3/23	9.32	22.73	1	0
131	Navdeep Saini	India	2022	2023	4	1	0	2	2	0	0	2.00	100.00	72	6	3/40	12.17	24.33	2	0
132	Ravichandran Ashwin	India	2022	2024	45	31	12	344	50	0	1	18.11	132.51	1026	35	3/17	7.82	38.23	11	0
133	Trent Boult	New Zealand	2022	2024	42	17	12	70	17*	0	0	14.00	118.64	920	45	3/22	8.13	27.71	11	0
134	Yuzvendra Chahal	India	2022	2024	46	2	1	5	5	0	0	5.00	62.50	1073	66	5/40	8.42	22.80	6	0
135	Kuldeep Sen §	India	2022	2024	12	1	1	0	0*	0	0	–	0.00	241	14	4/20	9.63	27.64	4	0
136	Shimron Hetmyer §	West Indies	2022	2026	63	57	20	1043	59*	0	3	28.19	148.36	0	–	–	–	–	35	0
137	Joe Root	England	2023	2023	3	1	0	10	10	0	0	10.00	66.67	12	0	0/14	7.00	–	2	0
138	Abdul Basith	India	2023	2023	1	1	1	1	1*	0	0	–	100.00	0	–	–	–	–	0	0
139	Jason Holder	West Indies	2023	2023	8	3	1	12	11	0	0	6.00	109.09	171	4	2/29	9.96	71.00	4	0
140	Murugan Ashwin	India	2023	2023	2	0	0	0	0	0	0	–	–	24	0	0/11	13.25	–	0	0
141	KM Asif	India	2023	2023	4	1	0	0	0	0	0	–	0.00	84	3	2/42	10.42	46.00	1	0
142	Adam Zampa	Australia	2023	2023	6	3	0	10	7	0	0	3.33	62.50	132	8	3/22	8.55	23.50	0	0
143	Dhruv Jurel § ‡	India	2023	2026	53	46	12	994	81*	0	7	29.24	154.35	0	–	–	–	–	33	1
144	Sandeep Sharma §	India	2023	2026	35	3	3	8	6*	0	0	–	72.73	757	33	5/18	8.91	34.06	9	0
145	Tom Kohler-Cadmore ‡	England	2024	2024	4	3	0	48	20	0	0	16.00	88.89	0	–	–	–	–	1	0
146	Rovman Powell	West Indies	2024	2024	10	7	1	103	27	0	0	17.17	151.47	0	–	–	–	–	7	0
147	Donovan Ferreira §	South Africa	2024	2026	13	11	2	242	69	0	2	26.89	166.90	12	1	1/14	12.50	25.00	9	0
148	Tanush Kotian	India	2024	2024	1	1	0	24	24	0	0	24.00	77.42	0	–	–	–	–	0	0
149	Avesh Khan	India	2024	2024	16	3	3	10	7*	0	0	–	200.00	329	19	3/27	9.59	27.68	2	0
150	Nandre Burger §	South Africa	2024	2026	8	0	0	–	–	0	0	–	–	144	10	2/26	8.33	20.00	2	0
151	Keshav Maharaj	South Africa	2024	2024	2	1	0	1	1	0	0	1.00	50.00	36	2	2/23	6.50	19.50	1	0
152	Shubham Dubey §	India	2024	2026	16	15	7	210	34*	0	0	26.25	164.06	0	–	–	–	–	1	0
153	Nitish Rana	India	2025	2025	11	11	1	217	81	0	2	21.70	161.94	12	0	0/9	9.00	–	2	0
154	Wanindu Hasaranga	Sri Lanka	2025	2025	11	5	0	9	4	0	0	1.80	60.00	246	11	4/35	9.05	33.73	2	0
155	Tushar Deshpande §	India	2025	2026	16	6	3	33	25	0	0	11.00	150.00	312	13	3/44	11.17	44.69	4	0
156	Fazalhaq Farooqi	Afghanistan	2025	2025	5	1	1	2	2*	0	0	–	100.00	102	0	0/30	12.35	–	0	0
157	Kumar Kartikeya	India	2025	2025	4	2	0	3	2	0	0	1.50	60.00	48	2	1/21	9.75	39.00	0	0
158	Maheesh Theekshana	Sri Lanka	2025	2025	11	4	2	10	5	0	0	5.00	37.04	252	11	2/26	9.76	37.27	0	0
159	Vaibhav Sooryavanshi §	India	2025	2026	18	18	0	692	103	2	3	38.44	224.68	0	–	–	–	–	0	0
160	Yudhvir Singh §	India	2025	2025	4	0	0	–	–	0	0	–	–	66	4	3/47	11.91	32.75	0	0
161	Kunal Singh Rathore ‡	India	2025	2025	1	1	0	0	0	0	0	0.00	0.00	0	–	–	–	–	0	0
162	Akash Madhwal	India	2025	2025	4	1	1	4	4*	0	0	–	44.44	90	4	3/29	11.07	41.50	0	0
163	Kwena Maphaka §	South Africa	2025	2025	2	1	1	8	8*	0	0	–	400.00	30	1	1/32	10.80	54.00	2	0
164	Ravi Bishnoi §	India	2026	2026	2	0	0	–	–	0	0	–	–	42	5	4/41	8.14	11.40	2	0
165	Brijesh Sharma §	India	2026	2026	13	0	0	–	–	0	0	–	–	273	14	2/18	9.89	32.14	1	0
166	Yash Raj Punja	India	2026	2026	8	-	-	-	-	-	-	-	-	180	9	2/35	9.30	31	0	0

== Captains ==
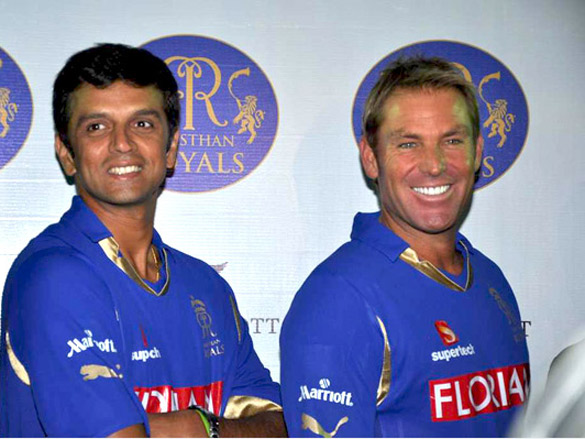
Warne (right) has captained RR in 56 matches, whereas Dravid (left) is second to him, with 40 matches.

Rajasthan Royals captains
Name	First	Last	Mat	Won	Lost	Tie	NR	Win%
Shane Warne	2008	2011	56	31	24	1	0	56.25
Shane Watson	2008	2015	21	7	11	2	1	40.00
Rahul Dravid	2012	2013	40	23	17	0	0	57.50
Steve Smith	2014	2020	27	15	11	0	1	57.69
Ajinkya Rahane	2018	2019	24	9	15	0	0	37.50
Sanju Samson	2021	2025	61	31	29	0	1	51.66
Riyan Parag	2025	2026	3	1	2	0	0	33.33
Total			232	117	109	3	3	51.99

== See also ==
- List of Indian Premier League centuries
- List of Indian Premier League records and statistics
