= Fingrowth Co-operative Bank =

Urban Co-operative Bank

- Type: Cooperative
- Industry: Banking
- Founded: 1959; 67 years ago
- Headquarters: Jaipur, Rajasthan, India,
- Area served: Rajasthan, Gujarat
- Website: fingrowthbank.bank.in

Fingrowth Co-operative Bank Ltd. (formerly The Urban Co-operative Bank Ltd) is a multi-state co-operative Bank. Its area of operation extends to the state of Rajasthan and Gujarat. The bank was founded in 1959 at Jaipur.
