= Rajasthan Basin =

The Rajasthan Basin is a sedimentary basin located in the northwest part of India. This sedimentary basin is one of India’s major sources of petroleum and natural gas and has a geographical extent of about 126,000 square kilometres (49,000 sq mi). The Rajasthan Basin unconfirmably overlies Precambrian basement rocks.

== Petroleum reserves ==
Significant reserves of naturally occurring hydrocarbons are expected in clastic and carbonate reservoirs within Cambrian to Paleocene sequences, such as limestone and shales, which are capped by intraformational shales and tight limestones. Oil and Natural Gas Corporation (ONGC), Oil India Limited, and Focus Energy are among the major petroleum companies operating in this basin.

== Sub-divisions ==
The Rajasthan Basin is further divided into three sub-basins.

1. Jaisalmer sub basin or Jaisalmer basin
2. Bikaner Nagaur sub basin or BNG basin (after Bikaner Nagaur and Ganganagar, town of Rajasthan)
3. Barmer Sanchor sub basin.

The Bikaner Nagaur sub-basin is separated from the Jaisalmer sub-basin by the Pokaran High, while the Devikot Nachna uplift separates the Barmer Sanchor sub-basin from the Jaisalmer sub-basin.
