= List of conglomerates in Tamil Nadu =

This is a list of NSE-indexed conglomerates with corporate offices in Tamil Nadu. Quarterly top-line (income) figures are given in millions of United States dollars (exchanged at ₹45). Green indicates double-digit quarterly growth.

Rank	Conglomerate	2010 Dec.	2010 Sep.	2010 Jun.	2010 Mar.	2009 Dec.	Notes
1	Shashank Petroleum Corporation NSE: CHENNPETRO	1,855	1,805	1,406	1,215	1,522	
2	Sterlite Industries NSE: STER	974	646	711	784	-	
3	Indian Overseas Bank NSE: IOB	767	683	641	629	629	
4	MRF NSE: MRF	529	481	428	393	368	
5	Ashok Leyland NSE: ASHOKLEY	495	603	522	653	403	
6	Redington India NSE: REDINGTON	478	452	390	-	344	
7	Titan Industries NSE: TITAN	434	341	278	-	296	
8	TVS Motor Company NSE: TVSMOTOR	359	353	304	265	242	
9	Shriram Transport Finance NSE: SRTRANSFIN	304	288	273	265	260	
10	Infrastructure Development Finance Company NSE: IDFC	258	243	220	207	-	
11	Neyveli Lignite Corporation NSE: NEYVELILIG	193	236	255	278	196	
12	India Cements NSE: INDIACEM	174	187	196	214	192	
13	Tube Investments of India NSE: TUBEINVEST	166	160	159	141	130	
14	Karur Vysya Bank NSE: KARURVYSYA	144	133	121	113	115	
15	Apollo Hospitals Enterprises NSE: APOLLOHOSP	134	116	107	107	101	
16	Sun TV Network NSE: SUNTV	133	94	98	100	88	
17	Ramco Cements NSE: MADRASCEM	129	143	155	135	188	
18	Lakshmi Machine Works NSE: LAXMIMACH	107	95	74	79	73	
19	Sundaram Fasteners NSE: SUNDRMFAST	103	103	90	80	80	
20	Chemplast Sanmar NSE: CHEMPLAST	96	107	86	80	67	
21	Orchid Chemicals and Pharmaceuticals NSE: ORCHIDCHEM	95	82	67	69	68	
22	City Union Bank NSE: CUB	78	75	67	63	62	
23	Polaris Software Lab NSE: POLARIS	77	75	69	65	65	
24	Sundaram Finance NSE: SUNDARMFIN	76	72	68	63	62	
25	Sakthi Sugars NSE: SAKHTISUG	75	72	102	114	92	
26	Lakshmi Vilas Bank NSE: LAKSHVILAS	64	66	61	60	58	
27	Aban Offshore NSE: ABAN	62	69	69	71	67	
28	Cholamandalam Investment and Finance NSE: CHOLAFIN	62	61	54	50	52	
29	Tamil Nadu Newsprint and Papers NSE: TNPL	59	64	64	77	53	
30	Tamil Nadu Petroproducts NSE: TNPETRO	59	61	53	50	57	
31	EID Parry NSE: EIDPARRY	56	64	67	71	80	
32	Bannari Amman Sugars NSE: BANARISUG	56	36	41	55	47	
33	Carborundum Universal NSE: CARBORUNIV	54	52	43	45	42	
34	Pricol NSE: PRICOL	45	45	42	45	42	
35	Elgi Equipments NSE: ELGIEQUIP	44	46	38	39	34	
36	Shasun Pharmaceuticals NSE: SHASUNPHAR	32	32	29	33	32	
37	ESAB India NSE: ESABINDIA	-	27	27	25	23	
38	Ramco Industries NSE: RAMCOIND	27	22	33	30	23	
39	Financial Technologies (India) NSE: FINANTECH	18	24	16	19	23	
40	KCP NSE: KCP	17	17	16	26	18	
41	Oriental Hotels NSE: ORIENTHOT	14	11	11	14	12	
42	First Leasing Company of India NSE: FIRSTLEASE	10	9	8	12	9	
43	Shanthi Gears NSE: SHANTIGEAR	8	8	7	7	5	
