= Jaisalmer basin =

Part of the Rajasthan basin, India

The Jaisalmer basin is one of the parts of the Rajasthan basin in northwestern India. This basin is geographically shared with Pakistan to the west.

Jaisalmer basin ages back to Mesozoic and Cenozoic. It is a pericratonic basin while the other two parts of Rajasthan basin; Bikaner-Nagaur and Barmer-Sanchor are intracratonic basins.

== Petroleum in the Jaisalmer sub basin ==
Within the Jaisalmer petroleum has been explored by various oil companies including Focus Energy, Oil & Natural Gas Corporation (ONGC) and Oil India Limited in the Lower Goru, Pariwar formations of Jaisalmer sub Basin. Clastic sandstones serve as the reservoirs. these include the Baisakhi-Bedesir, Pariwar, Goru, Sanu and Khuiala formations. Traps in this area are restricted to fault related closures and unconformity related traps. Other important formations are Sembar / Bedesir - Baisakhi Shales, Karampur/Badhaura Formation Shales, Bilara Shales and Dolomites.
