= Religion in Rajasthan =

Religion in State (2011)
1. Hinduism (88.5%)
2. Islam (9.10%)
3. Sikhism (1.30%)
4. Jainism (0.90%)
5. Christianity (0.10%)
6. Other/not stated (0.10%)

Rajasthanis are predominantly Hindu, Muslims and Jains. However, regardless of their religious segments, Muslim, Hindu and Jain Rajasthanis socialize with each other. Most Rajasthani Hindus are vaishnavas, however, Durga and her avatars are equally worshiped throughout Rajasthan. Oswals are predominantly Jains but small section of vaishnava Oswals are also found.

== Background ==
=== Hindus ===
All castes are followers of various Hindu sects and equally revere every Hindu deva. Jats are mostly Hindus and follow Vedic religion. Meenas of Rajasthan till date strongly follow Vedic culture which usually includes worship of Bhainroon (Shiva) and Krishna as well as Durga. The Rajputs generally worship the Vedic gods Sun, Shiva, Vishnu and Bhavani (goddess Durga). The Gurjars (Gujars or Gujjars) worship the Vedic gods of Sun god, God Devnarayan, Vishnu, Shiva and goddess Bhavani. Historically, The Gurjars were Sun-worshipers and are described as devoted to the feet of the Sun-god. Marathi Bhakti movement by Mahānubhavis and Varkaripanthis of Maharashtra who mainly followed Vaishnavism had immense influence on the development of Rajasthani Bhakti movement. Meerabai (मीराबाई) was an important figure during 'Rajasthani Bhakti movement.

=== Muslims ===
Rajasthani Muslims are predominantly Sunni Muslims. They are mainly Khan, Meo, Syed, Mirasi, Mughals, Qaimkhani, Neelgar, Manganiar, Muslim Rangrez, Bohra, Merat, Sheikh, Qureishi, Ansaari, Qazi, Sindhi-Sipahi, Rath and Pathans. With the introduction of Islam, some communities converted to Islam, though pre-Islamic community identity and some pre-Islamic socio-ritual elements have persisted. Rajasthani Muslim communities, after their conversion, continued to follow pre-conversion practices (Rajasthani rituals and customs) which is not the case in other parts of the country. This exhibits the strong cultural identity of Rajasthani people as opposed to religious identity.

=== Other religions ===
Some other religions are also prevalent such as Buddhism, Christianity, Parsi religion etc. Over time, there has been an increase in the number of followers of Sikh religion. Though Buddhism emerged as a dominating religion during 321-184 BC in Mauryan Empire, it had no influence in Rajasthan for the fact that Mauryan Empire had minimal impact on Rajasthan and its culture. Although, today Jainism is not that prevalent in Rajasthan but historically the Rajasthan and Gujarat areas were strong centres of Jainism in India, and the state is rich in Jain temples, large numbers of which are still maintained by Jain organizations.

== General statistics ==
Religion in Rajasthan
Religion	1951		1961		1971		1991		2001		2011	
Religion	Population	(%)	Population	(%)	Population	(%)	Population	(%)	Population	(%)	Population	(%)
Hinduism	14,454,926	91.09	18,132,690	89.95	23,093,895	89.63	39,201,099	89.08	50,151,452	88.75	60,657,103	88.49
Islam	991,246	6.21	1,314,613	6.52	1,778,275	6.90	3,525,339	8.01	4,788,227	8.47	6,215,377	9.07
Sikhism	148,229	0.93	274,198	1.36	341,182	1.33	649,174	1.47	818,420	1.45	872,930	1.27
Jainism	359,772	2.25	409,417	2.03	513,548	1.99	562,806	1.29	650,493	1.15	622,023	0.91
Christianity	11,421	0.07	22,864	0.11	30,202	0.12	47,989	0.11	72,660	0.13	96,430	0.14
Buddhism	759	>0.01	4,361	0.02	3,642	0.01	4,467	0.01	10,335	0.02	12,185	0.02
Other	819	>0.01	1,061	0.01	5,062	0.02	1,191	>0.01	5,253	0.01	4,676	>0.01
Not stated	N/A						13,925	0.03	10,348	0.02	67,713	0.09
Total	15,967,172		20,159,204		25,765,806		44,005,990		56,507,188		68,548,437	

== See also ==
- Rajasthani Muslims
- Jainism in Rajasthan
