= Gomati River (Rajasthan) =

River in India

Coordinates: 24°17′N 74°01′E

The Gomati River is a small river in Rajasthan state of western India. Gomati starts in the village of Khodiyo Ka Khera(Badisadri)iChittorgarh. It originates in the hills of central Udaipur District, flowing south to join the Som River in the southern part of the district. The river was dammed in the 17th century to create Dhebar Lake, also known as Jaisamand Lake, which has an area of 80 km^{2}.
