= Rajasthan Nirman Mazdoor Sangathan =

Trade union in India

R.N.M.S.
- Rajasthan Construction Workers' Organization
- Rajasthan Nirman Mazdoor Sangathan
- Location: India
- Key people: Shrilata Swaminathan (President)
- Affiliations: All India Central Council of Trade Unions

Rajasthan Nirman Mazdoor Sangathan (Rajasthan Construction Workers Organization) is a trade union of construction workers in Rajasthan, India. RNMS is affiliated to All India Central Council of Trade Unions. The President of RNMS is Shrilata Swaminathan.
