= Rajasthan Financial Corporation =

Indian financial institution

Rajasthan Financial Corporation (RFC) is the term lending development financial institution in Rajasthan state in India. It provides finance to small and medium scale enterprises. It was set up by Government of Rajasthan in 1955.The corporation has 37 branches and 5 sub offices in 33 districts of the State. Every state of India has its own financial corporation. The headquarter of RFC is at Jaipur.
