= Rajasthan State Mines and Minerals Limited =

Public sector enterprise of the Government of Rajasthan

Rajasthan State Mines & Minerals Limited
- Company type: Public sector enterprise
- Industry: Mining and minerals
- Founded: 1947 (as Bikaner Gypsum Limited)
- Headquarters: Bikaner (origin), Udaipur, Jodhpur, Jaipur (current locations), India
- Area served: Rajasthan, India
- Products: High grade rock phosphate, lignite, limestone, gypsum
- Parent: Government of Rajasthan
- Divisions: Rock phosphate, Lignite, Gypsum, Limestone
- Website: rsmm.com

Rajasthan State Mines & Minerals Limited (RSMML) is a public sector enterprise of the Government of Rajasthan that is primarily engaged in mining and marketing high grade rock phosphate, lignite, limestone and gypsum (non-metallic minerals) through its mines located at various locations in Rajasthan. RSMML is a multiple location organization which originated from Bikaner Gypsum limited (BGL), a private company founded in the year 1947 in the Bikaner district of Rajasthan. In 1974, after the discovery of rock phosphate in Jhamarkotra (Udaipur), BGL took over operations at Jhamarkotra mines. To enhance and stabilize the profit of company, the Government of Rajasthan acquired the majority of shares and company’s name was changed to Rajasthan state of Mines and Minerals Limited. RSMML has divided its functions according to the respective minerals. It is engaged in the mining of the 4 minerals gypsum, rock phosphate, limestone and lignite at 4 locations.

== Company Objective ==
The very objective of the company is to achieve cost effective technological innovations in the mining of minerals and to diversify into mineral based downstream projects. The Company is also aiming at long term fuel supply to lignite based power projects and setting up wind energy farms at Jaisalmer.

== Strategic Business Units & Profit Centers ==
After amalgamation, four mineral based Strategic Business Units & Profit Centres (SBU & PC) have been set up as a part of corporate restructuring:

- Strategic Business Unit and Profit Centre – Rock Phosphate at Udaipur. Jhamarkotra Phosphate Rock Mine
- Strategic Business Unit and Profit Centre – Gypsum at Bikaner
- Strategic Business Unit and Profit Centre – Limestone at Jodhpur
- Strategic Business Unit and Profit Centre – Lignite at Jaipur
