= Rajasthan Arabic and Persian Research Institute =

Research institute in Rajasthan, India

Maulana Abul Kalam Azad Arabic and Persian Research Institute
- MAPRI
- Established: 1978
- Location: Tonk, Rajasthan, India
- Type: Research Institute, Museum
- Collections: Quran, historical manuscripts, calligraphy, photographs, postage stamps

Maulana Abul Kalam Azad Arabic and Persian Research Institute (MAPRI) in Tonk in Rajasthan is an Indian institute promoting and furtherance of Arabic and Persian studies, established by the Government of Rajasthan in 1978 to conserve and preserve Persian and Arabic manuscripts in Rajasthan.

A large Quran and some historical manuscripts are on display at the institute as are examples of calligraphy, photographs, and postage stamps in an Art Gallery started in 2002.
