= Rajasthan Oriental Research Institute =

- Established: 1954
- Location: Jodhpur, Rajasthan, India
- Type: Cultural
- Collection size: Miniature paintings of Rajasthan, calligraphy, manuscripts (e.g., Samput Phalak, Gandika)
- Director: Muni Jinvijayaji

Rajasthan Oriental Research Institute is an organisation established by Government of Rajasthan to promote Rajasthani culture and heritage and to accumulate and maintain the old Rajasthani folk art work and folk literature. It was established in 1954 under guidance of Muni Jinvijayaji, a member of the Royal Asiatic Society. Dr. Rajendra Prasad laid foundation stone in 1955 and it opened on 14 September 1958. The institute's headquarters is in Jodhpur.

The institute has got a fine art gallery with a wide collection of miniature paintings of Rajasthan. The collection also includes some calligraphy and manuscripts like Samput Phalak and Gandika. The library has a wide collection of old books and journals.

== See also ==
- Arid Forest Research Institute (AFRI)
- Rajasthan Oriental Research Institute, de Jodhpur. Related with Research lnstitute, guru-sigya, descriptión Jodhpur (manuscrit) one hundred asanas, rules of diet, description of kanda nadl, kundalinl, knowledg the date of death and other kind of resources's control. Manuscrit has the #number 6756, size 17 cm. x 9cm, 171 pages, lines: 7-9 y 20-23 letters.
