= Rajasthan State Archives =

Indian archive

- Location: Bikaner, Rajasthan, India
- Type: Archive
- Collections: Administrative records of the Mughal period, documents from the Princely states of Rajasthan

Rajasthan State Archives is an archive located in Bikaner city of Rajasthan state in India. It has a rich collection of administrative record of the Mughal period like Persian Farmans, Nishans, Manshurs, Akbarat, Vakil Report, Arzdasht, Khatoot and records created during administration of the Princely states of Rajasthan such as Bahiat, Pattas, Parwanas, Rukkas, Chithiat etc. The researchers can use facilities like microfilming, reference library and research rooms provided by the institute. A record gallery has been set up for the tourists too which displays important documents of administrative, social, economical and historical value. The archives' headquarters are in Bikaner and there are branches in seven cities of the state.
