= Rajasthan State Industrial Development and Investment Corporation =

Government of Rajasthan agency

Rajasthan State Industrial Development and Investment Corporation Ltd., popularly known as RIICO, is an agency of Government of Rajasthan for the industrial development of Rajasthan.

RIICO is owned by Government of Rajasthan and it is an apex organisation of government of Rajasthan for development of industrial infrastructure within the state. RIICO is mainly engaged in site selection and acquisition of land, developing infrastructure for industrial area, financial assistance to small, medium and large-scale projects, equity participation in large projects on merit, technical consultancy for project identification and technical tie up, escort services, facilitation of government clearances, extending incentives and concessions as per the policy of the State Government.

The corporation was incorporated on 28 March 1969 as RSIMDC under the Companies Act, 1956, and got its present name on 1 January 1980. It has 33 unit offices in Rajasthan and has a staff of about 700 persons. RIICO has developed 360 industrial areas by acquiring about 85,390 acres (345.6 km^{2}) of land. Around 42,300 industries are in production within the industrial areas developed by RIICO in Rajasthan.
