= Outline of Telangana =

Overview of and topical guide to Telangana

Location of Telangana

The following outline is provided as an overview of and topical guide to Telangana:

Telangana – one of the 28 states in India, and is located in South India. Telangana acquired its identity as the Telugu-speaking region of the princely state of Hyderabad, ruled by the Nizam of Hyderabad, joining the Union of India in 1948. In 1956, the Hyderabad state was dissolved as part of the linguistic reorganisation of states and Telangana was merged with former Andhra State to form Andhra Pradesh. Following a movement for separation

== General reference ==
=== Names ===
  - Official name: Telangana
  - Common name: Telangana
    - Pronunciation:
  - Native name = తెలంగాణ تلنگانہ
  - Originally known as :
  - Nicknames
    - Seed Bowl of India
  - Adjectivals
    - Telugites
  - Demonyms
    - Telugite
  - Abbreviations and name codes
    - ISO 3166-2 code: IN-TG
    - Vehicle registration code: TG

=== Rankings (amongst India's states) ===
- by population: 12th
- by area (2011 census): 11th
- by crime rate (2015): 5th
- by gross domestic product (GDP): 10th
- by Human Development Index (HDI):
- by life expectancy at birth:
- by literacy rate:

== Geography of Telangana ==
Geography of Telangana

- Telangana is: an Indian state
- Population of Telangana:
- Area of Telangana:
- Atlas of Telangana

=== Location of Telangana ===
- Telangana is situated within the following regions:
  - Northern Hemisphere
  - Eastern Hemisphere
    - Eurasia
      - Asia
        - South Asia
          - Indian subcontinent
            - India
              - South India
- Time zone: Indian Standard Time (UTC+05:30)

=== Environment of Telangana ===
- Wildlife of Telangana
  - Flora of Telangana
  - Fauna of Telangana
    - Birds of Telangana

=== Protected areas of Telangana ===
==== Wildlife Sanctuaries ====
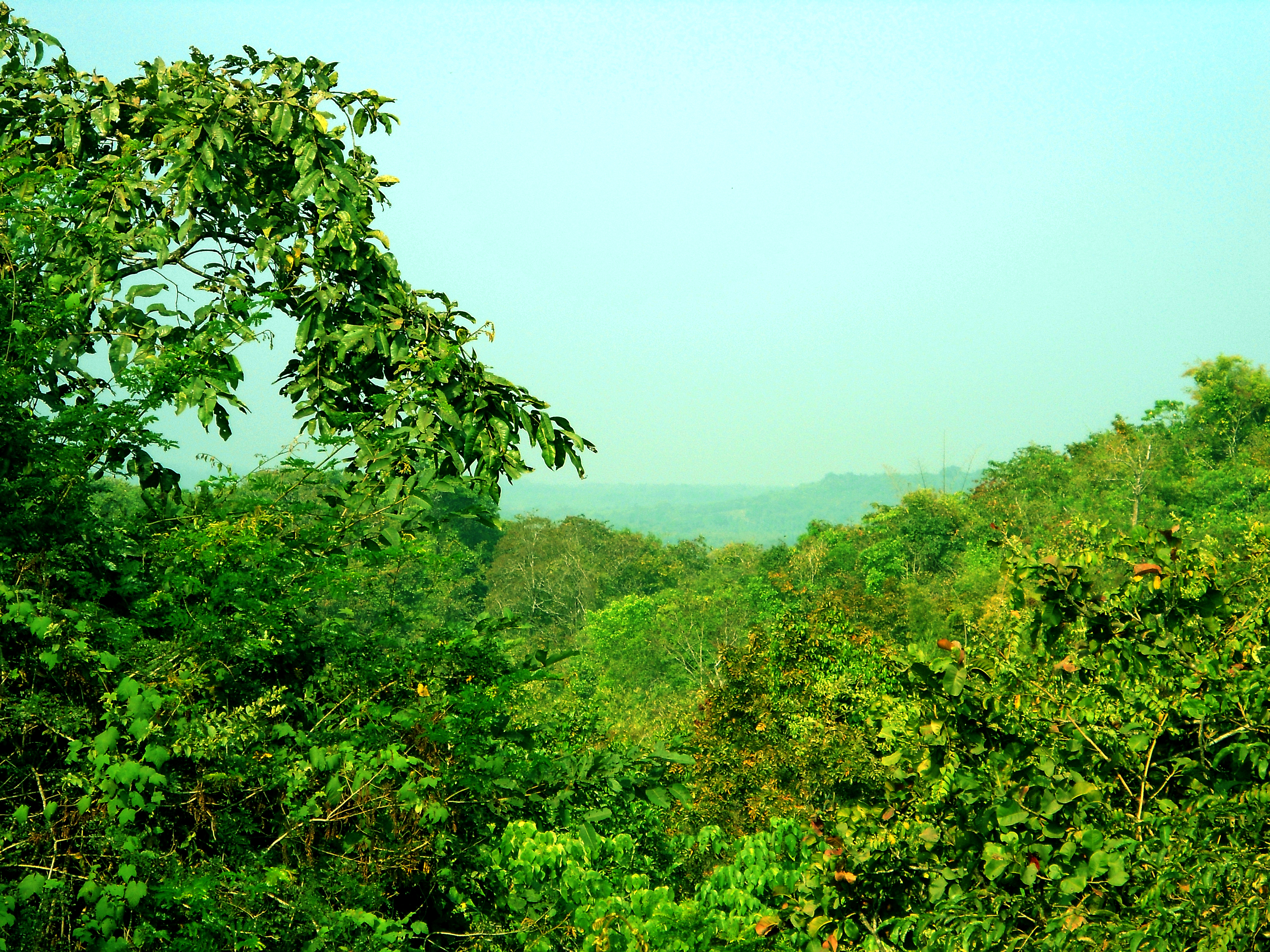
Forest at Eturnagaram, Telangana

- Eturnagaram Wildlife Sanctuary
- Kawal Wildlife Sanctuary
- Kinnerasani Wildlife Sanctuary
- Nagarjunsagar-Srisailam Tiger Reserve
- Pocharam Wildlife Sanctuary
- Shivaram Wildlife Sanctuary
- Pakhal Wildlife Sanctuary
- Pranahitha Wildlife Sanctuary

==== National Parks ====
- Mahavir Harina Vanasthali National Park
- Mrugavani National Park
- Kasu Brahmananda Reddy National Park

==== Zoo Park ====
- Nehru Zoological Park

=== Regions of Telangana ===
==== Administrative divisions of Telangana ====
===== Districts of Telangana =====
- Districts of Telangana

===== Municipalities of Telangana =====
Municipalities of Telangana

- Capital of Telangana: Hyderabad
- Cities of Telangana

=== Demography of Telangana ===
Demographics of Telangana

== Government and politics of Telangana ==
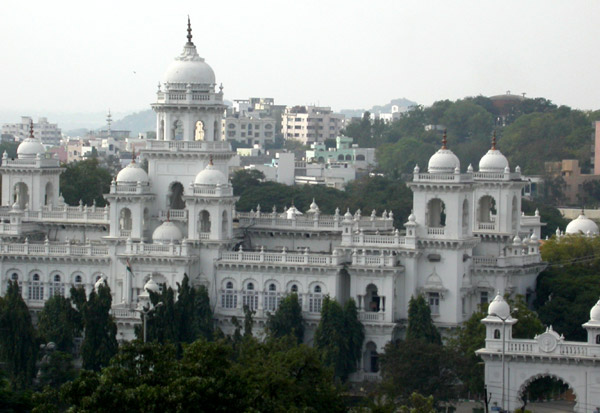
The state assembly building in Hyderabad, Telangana.

Politics of Telangana

- Form of government: Indian state government (parliamentary system of representative democracy)
- Hyderabad
- Telangana Pradesh Congress Committee
- Bharat Rashtra Samithi
- Bharatiya Janata Party Telangana
- All India Majlis-e-Ittehadul Muslimeen

=== Union government in Telangana ===
- Rajya Sabha members from Telangana
- Telangana Pradesh Congress Committee

=== Branches of the government of Telangana ===
Government of Telangana

==== Executive branch of the government of Telangana ====
- Head of state: Governor of Telangana,
- Head of government: Chief Minister of Telangana,

==== Legislative branch of the government of Telangana ====
Telangana Legislative Assembly

- Constituencies of Telangana Legislative Assembly

=== Law and order in Telangana ===
- Law enforcement in Telangana
  - Telangana Police

== History of Telangana ==
History of Telangana

=== History of Telangana, by period ===
- Assaka
- Satavahana dynasty
- Ikshvaku
- Vishnukundina
- Eastern Chalukyas
- Kakatiya dynasty
- Bahmani Sultanate
- Qutb Shahi dynasty
- Hyderabad State
- Telangana Rebellion
- Telangana movement
- Andhra Pradesh Reorganisation Act, 2014

== Culture of Telangana ==
Languages in Telangana
Language	Percent
Telugu	77%
Urdu	12%
Marathi	2%
Others	9%

Culture of Telangana

- Architecture of Telangana
  - Temples of Telangana
- Languages of Telangana
- Monuments in Telangana
  - Monuments of National Importance in Telangana
  - State Protected Monuments in Telangana
- World Heritage Sites in Telangana

=== The arts in Telangana ===
- Cinema of Telangana
  - Telugu cinema

- Nirmal toys and craft
- Pembarthi Metal Craft
- Cheriyal scroll painting

=== Cuisine of Telangana ===
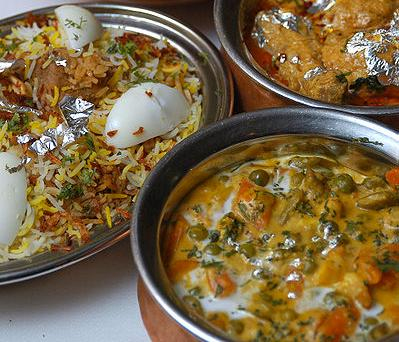
Hyderabadi Biryani

- Telangana cuisine
- Hyderabadi cuisine
  - Hyderabadi Biryani
  - Hyderabadi Haleem
  - Double ka meetha
  - Sakinalu

=== Festivals in Telangana ===
- Ugadi
- Dasara
- Vinayaka Chathurthi
- Eid ul-Fitr
- Easter
- Bonalu
- Batukamma

=== People of Telangana ===
- People from Telangana

=== Religion in Telangana ===
Religion in Telangana
Religion	Percent
Hinduism	86%
Islam	12.4%
Christianity	1.4%
Others	0.4%

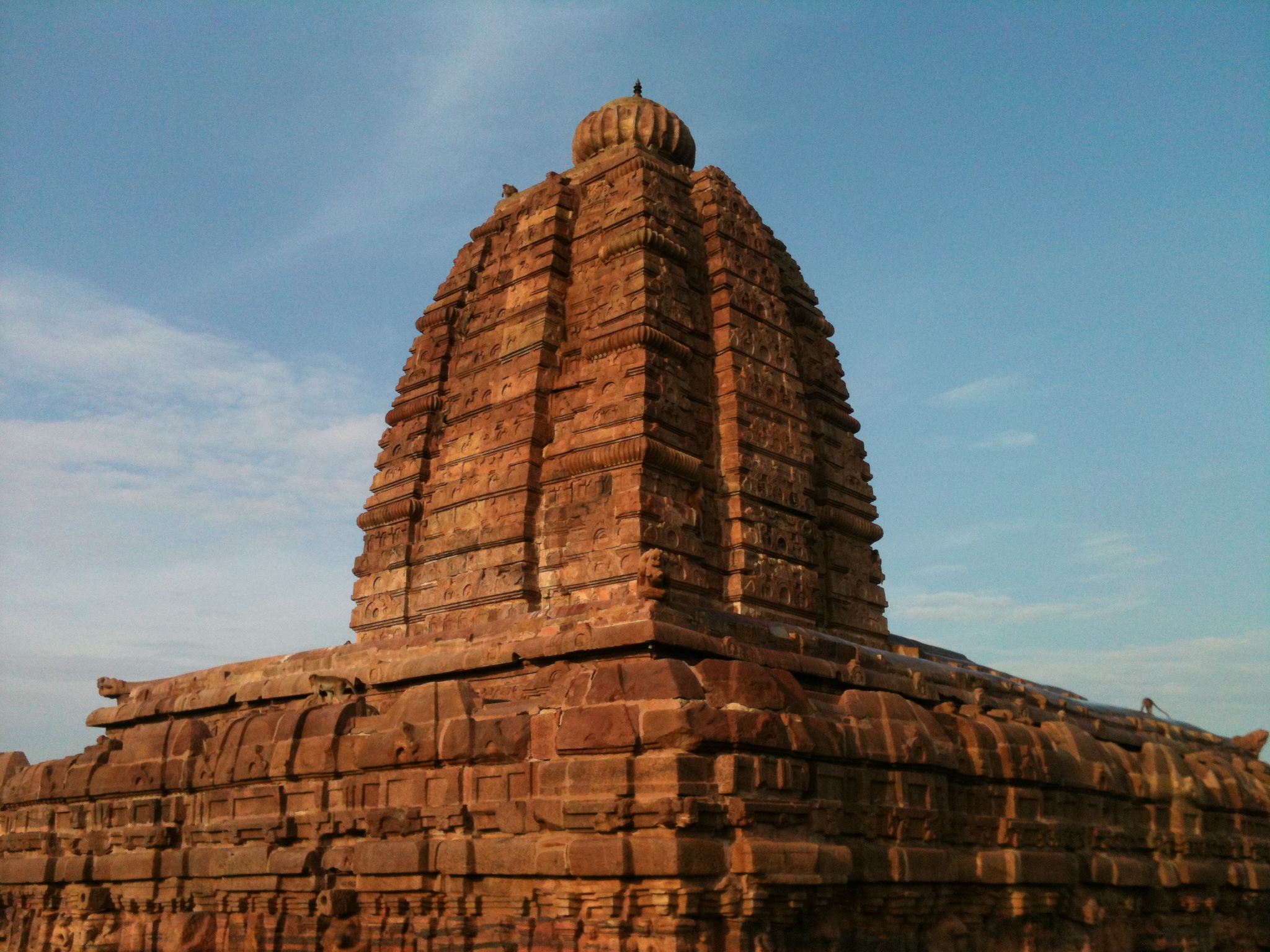
Sangameshwar temple at Alampur

Religion in Telangana

- Christianity in Telangana
- Hinduism in Telangana
  - Temples of Telangana

=== Sports in Telangana ===
- Football in Telangana
  - Telangana Football Association
  - Telangana State League
  - Telangana football team
- Stadiums in Hyderabad

=== Symbols of Telangana ===
Symbols of Telangana

- State animal: Spotted deer
- State bird: Pala pitta
- State flower: Tanged puvvu
- State seal: Seal of Telangana
- State song: Jaya Jaya He Telangana Janani Jayakethanam
- State tree: Jammi tree

== Economy and infrastructure of Telangana ==
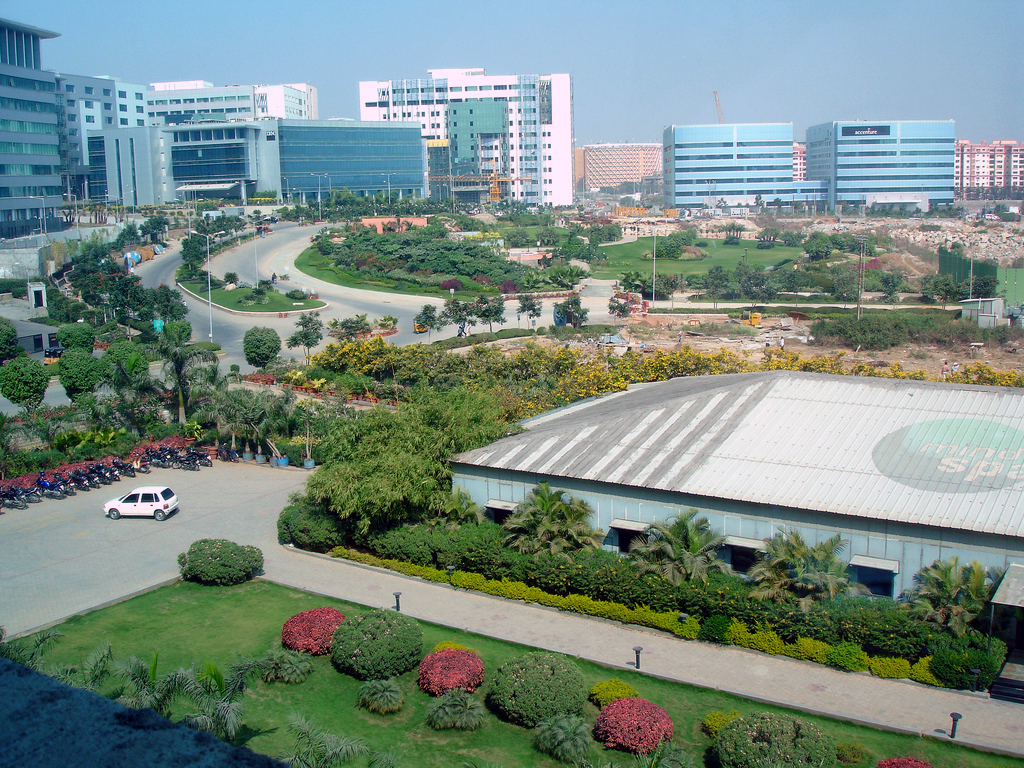
The HITEC City is a major IT hub of Hyderabad

Economy of Telangana

- Software industry in Telangana
- Tourism in Telangana
- Transport in Telangana
  - Airports in Telangana
  - Roads in Telangana
  - State Highways in Telangana

== Education in Telangana ==
Education in Telangana

- Educational institutions in Telangana
- Institutions of higher education in Telangana

== Health in Telangana ==
Health in Telangana

== See also ==
- Outline of India
