= Temples of Telangana =

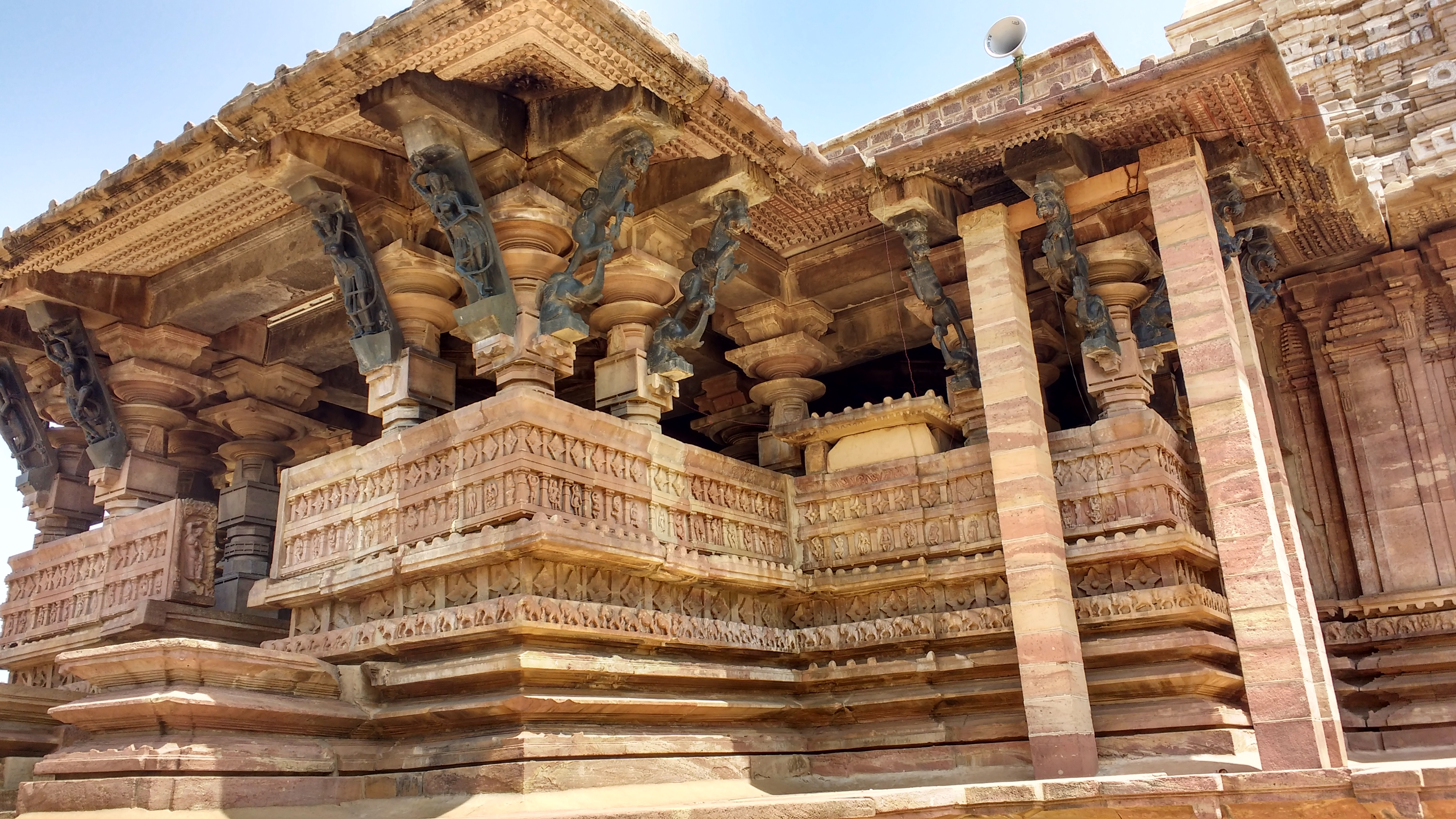
The 13th-century Ramappa Temple is a UNESCO World Heritage Site

The earliest Temples in Telangana include the Alampur Navabrahma Temples built during the 6th century CE by the Badami Chaulukyas.

The Kalyani Chaulukyas built several temples in modern-day Telangana including the Ramalingeswara Temple, Nandikandi.

Kakatiya architecture was developed during the reign of the Kakatiya dynasty between the 12th and 14th centuries. Prominent Kakatiya temples include the Ramappa and Thousand Pillar temples, as well as the Kota Gullu temple complex. The Karmanghat Hanuman Temple in Hyderabad is also dated to this period, however, the current temple structure is a later construction.

The Birla Mandir, Hyderabad was constructed between 1966 and 1976 as one of several temples built by the Birla family.

శ్రీరంగంలోని రంగనాథ స్వామి ఆలయాన్ని తలపించేలా తెలంగాణా రాష్ట్రంలోని నాగర్ కర్నూలు జిల్లా శ్రీపురం గ్రామంలో గోదా సమేత రంగనాథ స్వామి కొలువు తీరిన అత్యంత పురాతన అలయమే శ్రీపురం శ్రీ రంగనాయక స్వామి ఆలయం. (Sripuram Ranganayaka Temple). ఈ ఆలయాన్ని సుమారు 500 ఏళ్ల క్రితం నిర్మాణం చేపట్టారు. శ్రీపురం అనే గ్రామానికీ చెందిన వింజమూరి వంశానికి చెందిన నాలుగో నరసింహ చార్యులు అనే అనే రంగనాధ స్వామి భక్తుడు శ్రీరంగంలోని రంగనాథ స్వామిని దర్మించుకుని అక్కడి నుండి స్వామివారి విగ్రహాన్ని తలపై ఎత్తుకుని కాలినడకన శ్రీపురం చేరుకుని ప్రతిష్ట చేసారని చరిత్ర కారులు తెలిపారు. నాగర్కర్నూల్ జిల్లా కేంద్రానికి 5 కిలో మీటర్ల దూరంలో ఉన్న శ్రీపురం గ్రామంలో ఉన్న ఈ ఆలయం జిల్లాలోనే అత్యంత పురాతన వైష్ణవ ఆలయాల్లో ఒకటిగా నిలుస్తోంది. అత్యంత మహిమ కలిగిన శ్రీపురం రంగనాథ స్వామి దర్శనం కోసం సుదూర ప్రాంతాల నుంచి భక్తులు తరలి వస్తుంటారు. ఈ ఆలయంలో వైకుంఠ ఏకాదశి రోజున స్వామి వారిని దర్శించుకుకోవం సకల పుణ్యాలను కలిగిస్తుంది అని భక్తుల నమ్మకం. ప్రతి ఏటా జేష్ఠ మాసంలో జరిగే బ్రహ్మోత్సవాలకి వేలాది మంది భక్తులు తరలి వచ్చి స్వామివారిని సేవిస్తుంటారు. Sri Ranganayaka Swamy Temple, Sripuram, Nagar Kurnool District.

== List of Temples ==
Key
†	Denotes UNESCO Heritage Site

Name	Image	Location	Coordinates	Established	Ref(s)
Raja Rajeswara Temple		Vemulawada		750-930 CE	
Yadadri Temple		Yadadri, Bhuvanagiri			
Keesara		Keesara			
Kaleswaram		Kaleswaram			
Kondagattu		Kondagattu, Jagitlyal District			
Alampur Navabrahma Temples		Jogulamba Gadwal		6th century CE	
Alampur Papanasi Temples		Jogulamba Gadwal			
Bhadrakali Temple, Warangal		Warangal			
Birla Mandir		Hyderabad		1976	
Chaya Someswara Temple		Nalgonda		11th Century	
Devunigutta Temple		Jayashankar Bhupalpally	18°6′54.6″N 80°02′13.3″E	6th century CE	
Jagannath Temple		Hyderabad		2009	
Jamalapuram Temple					
Karmanghat Hanuman Temple		Hyderabad			
Kota Gullu					
Pachala Someswara Temple		Nalgonda		11th Century	
Ramalingeswara Temple		Sangareddy			
Ramappa Temple		Mulugu	18°15′33″N 79°56′36″E		
Sanghi Temple		Ranga Reddy			
Bhadrachalam Temple		Bhadradri Kothagudem		1674 CE	
Thousand Pillar Temple		Warangal		1163 CE	

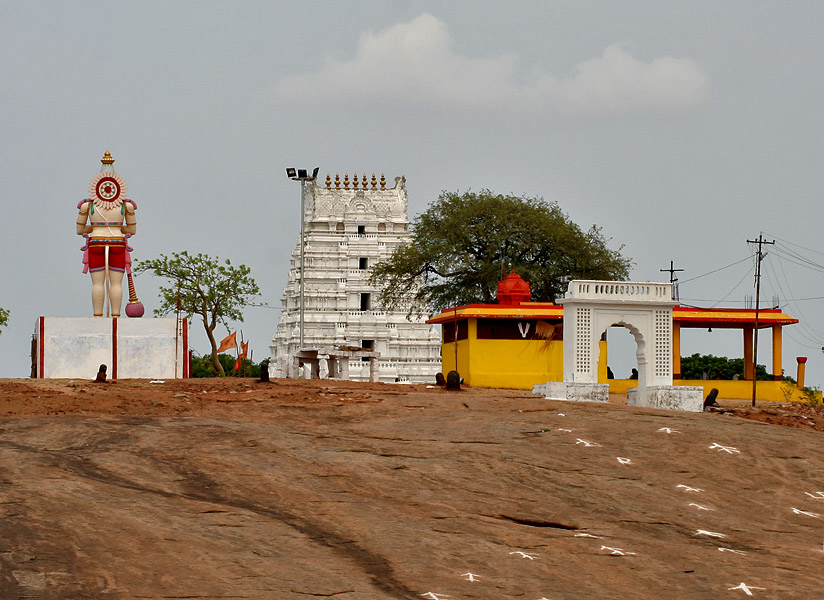
Temple at Keesaragutta

- Yadadri Temple: Lord Vishnu (whose reincarnation is Lord Narasimha). The main deity is Lakshmi Narasimha Swamy. Located in Yadadri Bhuvanagiri District. In Ancient days Sri Yada Maharshi son of Sri Rushyashrunga Maharshi with the Blessings of Anjaneya Swamy had performed great penance for Lord Narasimha Swamy. After securing blessing for his penance Lord Narasimha had come into existence in Five Avatharas called as Sri Jwala Narasimha, Sri Yogananda Narasimha, Sri Ugra Narasimha, Sri Gandaberunda Narasimha, Sri Lakshmi Narasimha. As such this is known as "Pancha Narasimha Kshetram".
- Raja Rajeswara Temple, Vemulawada : Notable for the Sri Raja Rajeswara Swamy Temple complex, a site of pilgrimage for both Hindu (particularly devotees of Vishnu and Shiva) and Muslim worshippers. Built by Chalukya Kings between AD 750 and 975, the complex is named for its presiding deity Sri Raja Rajeswara Swamy, an incarnation of Lord Shiva. It houses several temples dedicated to other deities including Sri Rama, Lakshmana, Lakshmi, Ganapathy, Lord Padmanabha Swamy and Lord Bhimeswara. The complex also contains a 400-year-old mosque. The temple is located in Karimnagar District.
- Basara: Gnana Saraswati Temple (Goddess of Knowledge) is located on the banks of the river Godavari in Nirmal District.
- Kaleswaram: Kaleswaram Temple is located in Kaleswaram is a village in Mahadevpur Mandal in Karimnagar district in the Indian state of Telangana.
- Dharmapuri: Dharmapuri attained religious importance owing to the existence of the shrine dedicated to Narasimha Swamy. Located in Karimnagar District.
- Kondagattu: Lord Hanuman Temple. According to the folklore, the temple was constructed by a cowherd some 300 years ago. Located in Karimnagar District.
- Alampur: Jogulamba Temple is located in the South-East corner of the village beside the Tungabhadra river. Bahamani sultans destroyed old temple of Jogulamba in the 14th century. The idols of Jogulamba and her two shaktis Chandi, and Mundi were protected from them and placed in Bala Brahmeswara Swamy temple until 2005. The new temple was constructed in the same place and the goddess was relocated. As per the local people, Jogulamba is a Ugra rupa (highly energetic and hard to worship) and the water pool nearby it makes the atmosphere cool. The Yogamba (Jogulamba) temple is regarded as a Shakti Peetha where Sati Devi's upper teeth fell. The mythology of Daksha yaga and Sati's self-immolation is the story of the origin of Shakti Peethas
- Suryapet-Peddagattu (పెద్దగట్టు జాతర) or Gollagattu Jathara (గొల్లగట్టు జాతర) is the festival done in the name of Lord Lingamanthulu Swamy and Goddess Choudamma every 2 years.The presiding deities, Sri Lingamanthula Swamy, believed an Incarnation of Lord Shiva, and his sister – Choudamma, are offered various pujas during the five-day fete.
- Hemachala Lakshmi Narsimha Swamy Temple is the most ancient architectural divine ensemble which is located on the Mallur Ghat in the Mangapeta mandal of Mulugu district.
- Chilkur Balaji Temple is popularly known as Visa Balaji Temple is an ancient Hindu temple of Lord Balaji on the banks of Osman Sagar Lake near Hyderabad, India. It is 17 km from Mehedipatnam. It is one of the oldest temples in Hyderabad built during the time of Madanna and Akkanna, the uncles of Bhakta Ramadas.
- Komrelly Mallanna Temple: Komuravelli Mallikarjuna Swamy Temple (Lord Shiva) located in Komuravelly Village, Cheriyal Mandal, Warangal District.
- Wargal Saraswati Temple: Sri Vidya Saraswati Temple located in Wargal, 47 km from Secunderabad (JBS), Medak District.
- Sri Stambhadri Lakshmi Narasimha Swamy temple is located in the heart of the City of Khammam. The city gets its name from the Stambhadri hill on which the temple is located.The ancient deity is located inside a cave on top of the hill.The temple is believed to be existing since Treta Yuga.
- Garlavoddu Sri Lakshmi Narasimha Swamy Temple located in Enkuru village which is 45 km from Khammam City. This is one of the famous Temples in Khammam District.
- Surendrapuri Surendrapuri is a religious tourism destination near Hyderabad, India in the Yadadri Bhuvanagiri district.

== List of Prominent Temples ==
- Alampur Jogulamba Temple
- Gnana Saraswati Temple
- Raja Rajeswara Temple, Vemulawada
- Kondagattu
- Chilkur Balaji Temple
- Yadagirigutta Temple
- Karmanghat Hanuman Temple
- Lakshmi Narasimha Temple, Dharmapuri
- Kaleshwara Mukteswara Swamy Temple
- Ranganathaswamy Temple, Jiyaguda
- Chaya Someswara Temple
- Wargal Saraswati Temple
- Sri Peddamma Thalli Temple
- Keesaragutta Temple
- Surendrapuri
- Sri Ranganayaka Swamy Temple, Sripuram Village, Nagarkrnool District, Telangana
