= Sankarananda Matha =

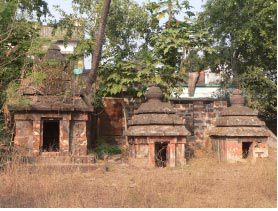
- Burial Template I

- Location in Orissa

Religion
- Affiliation: Hinduism

Location
- Location: Bhubaneswar
- State: Orissa
- Country: India
- Coordinates: 20°14′41″N 85°50′6″E

Architecture
- Type: Kalinga Architecture
- Elevation: 75 ft (23 m)

Sankarananda Matha is located in Uttaradaraja Badu Sahi, on the southern embankment of Bindusagar tank in Old Town, Bhubaneswar, Odisha. It is situated on the left side of Sankarananda Street, branching from the Ratha road. It is a branch of Sankarananda Matha at Puri. Sankara Sivananda Saraswati was the founder of the Matha. Some of the previous Matha mahantas were Sachidananda Saraswati, Balabrahmanda Saraswati and Ramakrishnananda Saraswati. With shared ownership, the Matha is under the control of the Endowments Department of the Government of Orissa but is in a bad state of preservation; it is a quite dilapidated monastery. Balabrahmanda Saraswati is the present mahanta of the Matha. Only a shrine is in use and under worship.

== Description ==
The Matha is surrounded by Krishna Chandra Gurukula Sanskrit College to the east, at a distance of four metres across the street; Mohini temple to the west; Bindusagar tank to the north, within a distance of 80 metres; and Gopalatirtha Matha to the south, at a distance of 30 metres. The Matha faces east. The Matha has a rectangular plan, measuring 20 metres by 16 metres. The Matha is a single-storey building, 3.5 metres high. The rooms measure 8.7 metres long by 3.35 metres wide. It was dressed in laterite blocks, but is in an advanced state of deterioration and overgrown by vegetation.

The roof of the more northerly building has collapsed, and no individual mahanta or organization, including the Endowments Department, is maintaining or caring for the premises.

== Grade (A/B/C) ==
i) Architecture: B

ii) Historic: C

iii) Associational: C

iv) Social/Cultural: C

== Threats to the property ==
A compound wall, made out of laterite blocks, measures 28.3 metres by 19.6 metres in width and is 1.8 metres high, with a thickness of 0.55 metres. It has an entrance in the eastern side. Rainwater directly enters into the Matha due to the absence of a roof. Wild grasses, pipal trees and Ashoka trees have grown in the exterior wall and on the inner side of the Matha in the northern building. The wild vegetation is weakening the foundation as well as the superstructure of the matha.

There are seven detached sculptures in a modern construction on the southern side of the Matha — three circular Yoni pithas with Śiva lingam, as well as Ganeṣa, four-armed Narasimha and Gajalakshmi images. There are three burial temples within the precinct. All three burial-temples of the Matha are surrounded by residential buildings to the west and with the open space of the Matha precinct on the other sides, and each was erected over the burial place of one of the monastery's Mahantas, in recognition of his religious merits and contributions to society.

== Burial Temple I ==
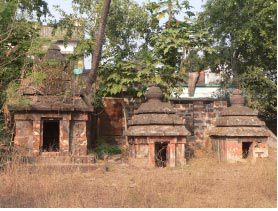
Temple I

Location: Lat. 20° 14’ 41" N, Long. 85° 50’ 06" E, Elev., 75 ft. The first temple is one of three such burial temples in the Sankarananda Matha precinct, situated in the southwest corner at a distance of 50 metres from the matha building. It is located in the right side of the Ratha road leading from the Lingaraja temple to the Ramesvara temple. The temple enshrines a Śiva-lingam within a circular yoni-pitha.

The burial-temple has a square vimana measuring 1.72 square metres. Its height is of pidha order, having bada, gandi and mastaka that, overall, measure 3.07 metres from bottom to the top. With the threefold division of the bada, the temple has a trianga bada that is 1.05 metres high, a gandi with three receding tiers measuring 1.32 metres high. The mastaka, with its components — beki, ghanta, amalaka, khapuri and kalasa measures 0.7 metres in height. The doorjambs are 0.67 metres high by 0.47 metres wide are plain.

== Burial Temple II ==
Location: Lat.20° 14’41" N., Long.85° 50’ 06"E. Elev 75 ft. The second burial temple is in the south-west corner of the precinct, some 50 metres from the matha building on the right side of the Ratha road leading from the Lingaraja temple to Ramesvara temple. The temple enshrines a Śiva-lingam within a circular yoni-pitha. Worship no longer takes place there, and the temple is abandoned.

On plan, the burial temple has a square vimana measuring 1.95 square metres. On elevation, it is of pidha order having bada, gandi and mastaka that measures 3.55 metres in height from bottom to the top. With the threefold division of the bada the burial temple has a trianga bada that measures 1.2 meters in height. A gandi with three receding tiers measures 1.55 metres in height. The mastaka measures 0.8 metres. The doorjambs measure 0.95 metres in height x 0.59 metres in width. It is not in a good state of preservation because of the growth of vegetation.

== Burial Temple III ==
Location: Lat. 20° 14’ 41"N, Long. 85° 50’ 06"E, Elev., 75 ft Situated in the southwest corner at a distance of 50 metres from the matha building, it is on the right side of the Ratha road leading from the Lingaraja temple to the Ramesvara temple. The temple enshrines a Śiva-lingam within a circular yoni-pitha.

Burial temple III stands over two successive square platforms. Each side of the first platform measures 3.58 metres and has a height of 0.31 metres. The second platform is 2.87 metres square, with a height of 0.25 metres. The temple has a square vimana measuring 2.38 metres on each side with a frontal porch measuring 0.23 metres. The temple is of pidha order, measuring 4.05 metres in height from pabhaga to kalasa. From the bottom to the top, the temple has a bada, gandi and mastaka. With threefold division of the bada, the temple is 1.55 metres high (pabhaga 0.63 metres, jangha 0.61 metres and baranda 0.31 metres in height). The gandi of the temple, with its three receding tiers, measures 1.40 metres in height. The raha and parsva devata niches — located on the raha paga of the jangha on the north, west and south sides — measure 0.45 metres high x 0.25 metres wide x 0.14 metres in depth; all are now empty. The doorjambs measure 1.18 metres x 0.74 metres. The temple is not in a good state due to the growth of vegetation all over the superstructure.
