= Hinduism in Odisha =

Overview of Sanatan in Odisha

Odia Hindu ଓଡ଼ିଆ ହିନ୍ଦୁ
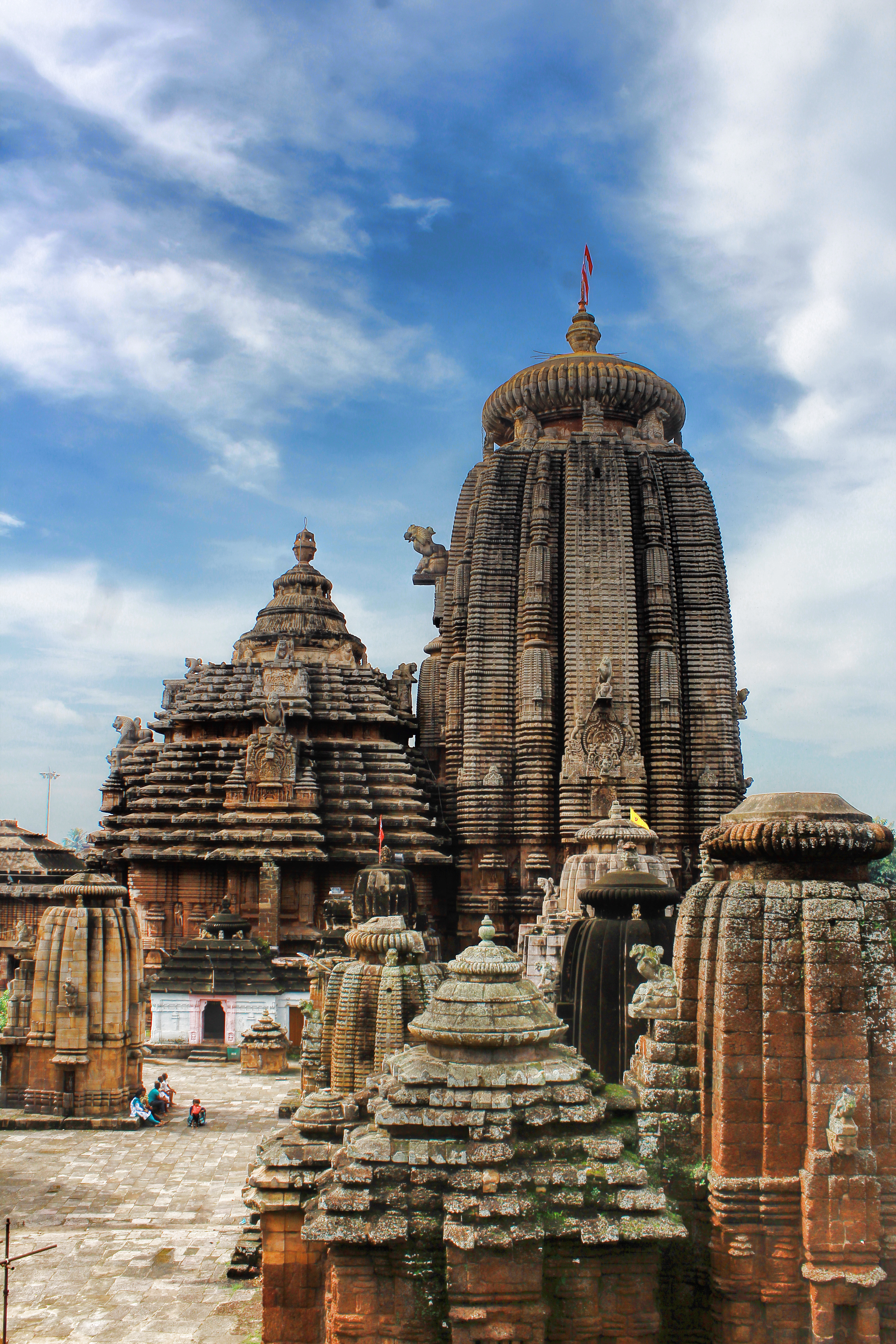
- Lingaraja Temple built by the Somavanshi king Jajati Keshari.

Total population
- 39,300,341 (2011); 93.63% ▼

Religions
- Sanatan (Hinduism)

Scriptures
- Bhagavad Gita and Vedas (other scripture and literature includes Gita Govinda, Ramayana, and others)

Languages
- Odia

Related ethnic groups
- Odia Christians and Odia Muslims

Hinduism is a majority religion in Odisha, which is followed by nearly 93.6% of the total population of the state. Odisha has a very rich cultural heritage of Hinduism and the state has second highest percentage of Hindus, after Himachal Pradesh. The state is home for the tribal culture and historical Hindu temple, the notable includes the Jagannath Temple in Puri and Lingaraja Temple. Ratha Yatra of Puri is one of the biggest Hindu pilgrimage in India. The state has also many Historical sites.

== Demographics ==
Approximately 93.6% of Odisha residents follow Hinduism, which makes it the dominant religion in the region. Many of the tribal people follow their traditional tribal religions.

=== Hindus decadal population ===
Hindu population in Odisha (decades wise)
Year	Pop.	±%
1951	14,368,411	—
1961	17,123,193	+19.2%
1971	21,121,056	+23.3%
1981	25,161,725	+19.1%
1991	29,971,257	+19.1%
2001	34,726,129	+15.9%
2011	39,300,341	+13.2%

=== Hindu population by district ===
Districts of Odisha	Total pop	Hindus pop	Hindus %
Bargarh	1,346,336	1,327,967	98.64%
Jharsugu	509,716	490,127	96.16%
Sambalpur	935,613	873,795	93.39%
Debagarh	274,108	261,544	95.42%
Sundargarh	1,830,673	1,431,762	78.21%
Kendujhar	1,561,990	1,525,874	97.69%
Mayurbhanj	2,223,456	1,859,639	83.64%
Baleshwar	2,024,508	1,937,765	95.72%
Bhadrak	1,333,749	1,248,486	93.61%
Kendrapara	1,302,005	1,257,156	96.56%
Jagatsinghapur	1,057,629	1,014,872	95.96%
Cuttack	2,341,094	2,199,526	93.95%
Jajapur	1,624,341	1,543,317	95.01%
Dhenkanal	1,066,878	1,060,943	99.44%
Anugul	1,140,003	1,127,926	98.94%
Nayagarh	864,516	859,219	99.39%
Khordha	1,877,395	1,798,214	95.78%
Puri	1,502,682	1,459,872	97.15%
Ganjam	3,160,635	3,132,628	99.11%
Gajapati	518,837	341,308	65.78%
Kandhamal	648,201	527,757	81.42%
Baudh	373,372	372,070	99.65%
Sonapur	541,835	538,472	99.38%
Balangir	1,337,194	1,312,924	98.19%
Nuapada	530,690	523,309	98.61%
Kalahandi	1,335,494	1,322,363	99.02%
Rayagada	831,109	770,572	92.72%
Nabarangapur	1,025,766	991,639	96.67%
Koraput	1,180,637	1,119,527	94.82%
Malkangiri	504,198	495,556	98.29%

== Temples ==
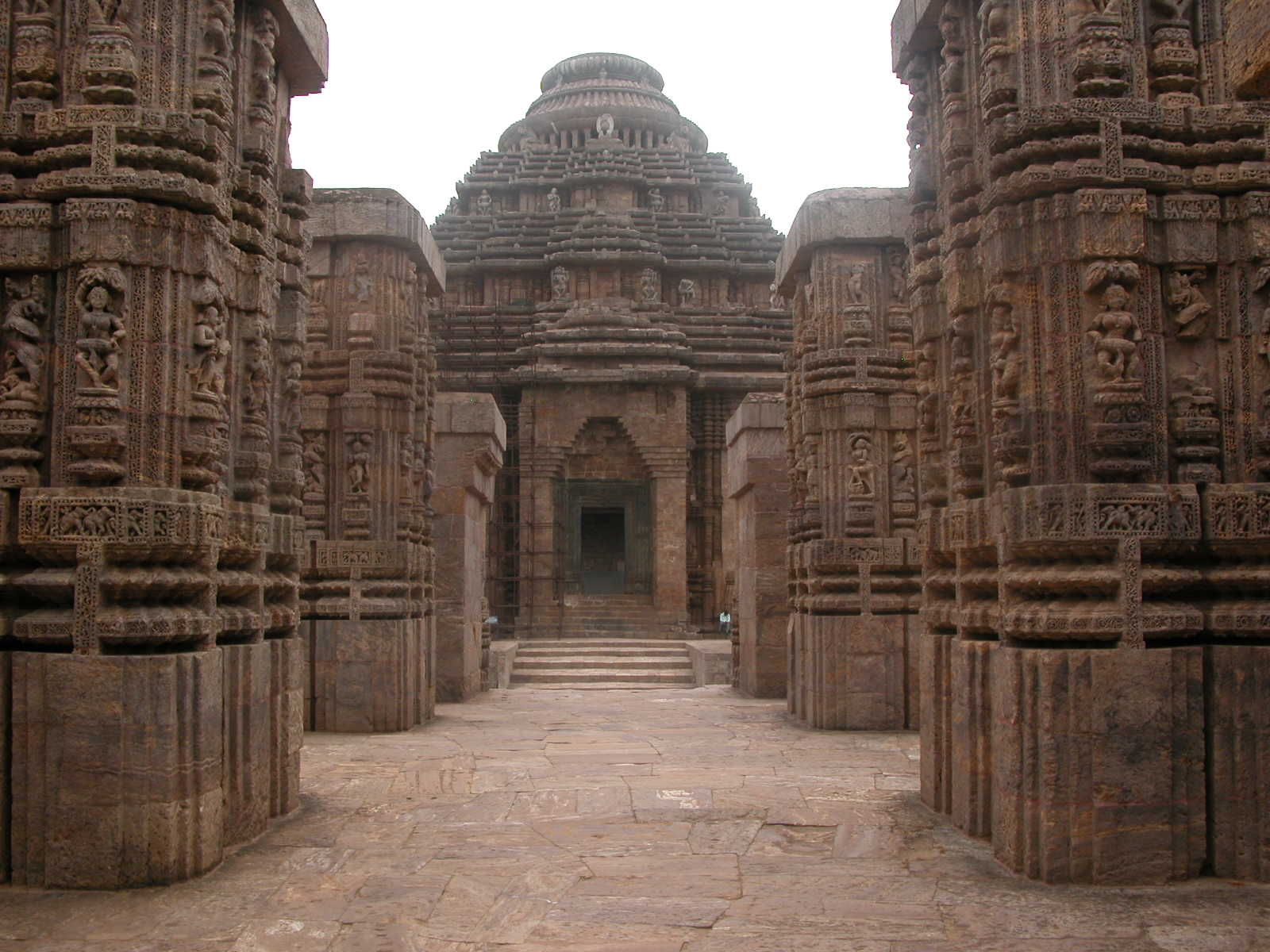
Konark Sun Temple.

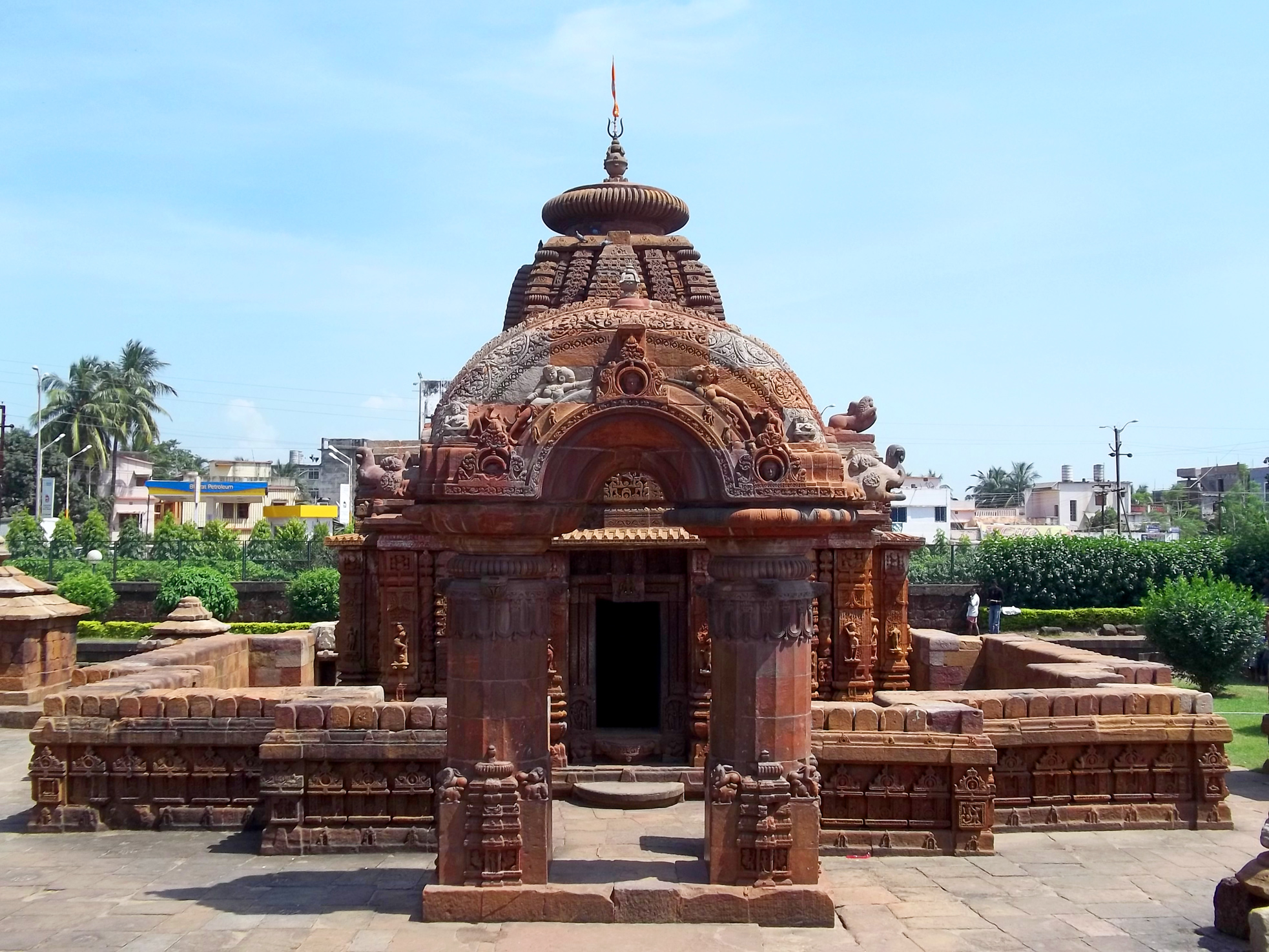
Muktesvara deula Panoramic View, Odisha.

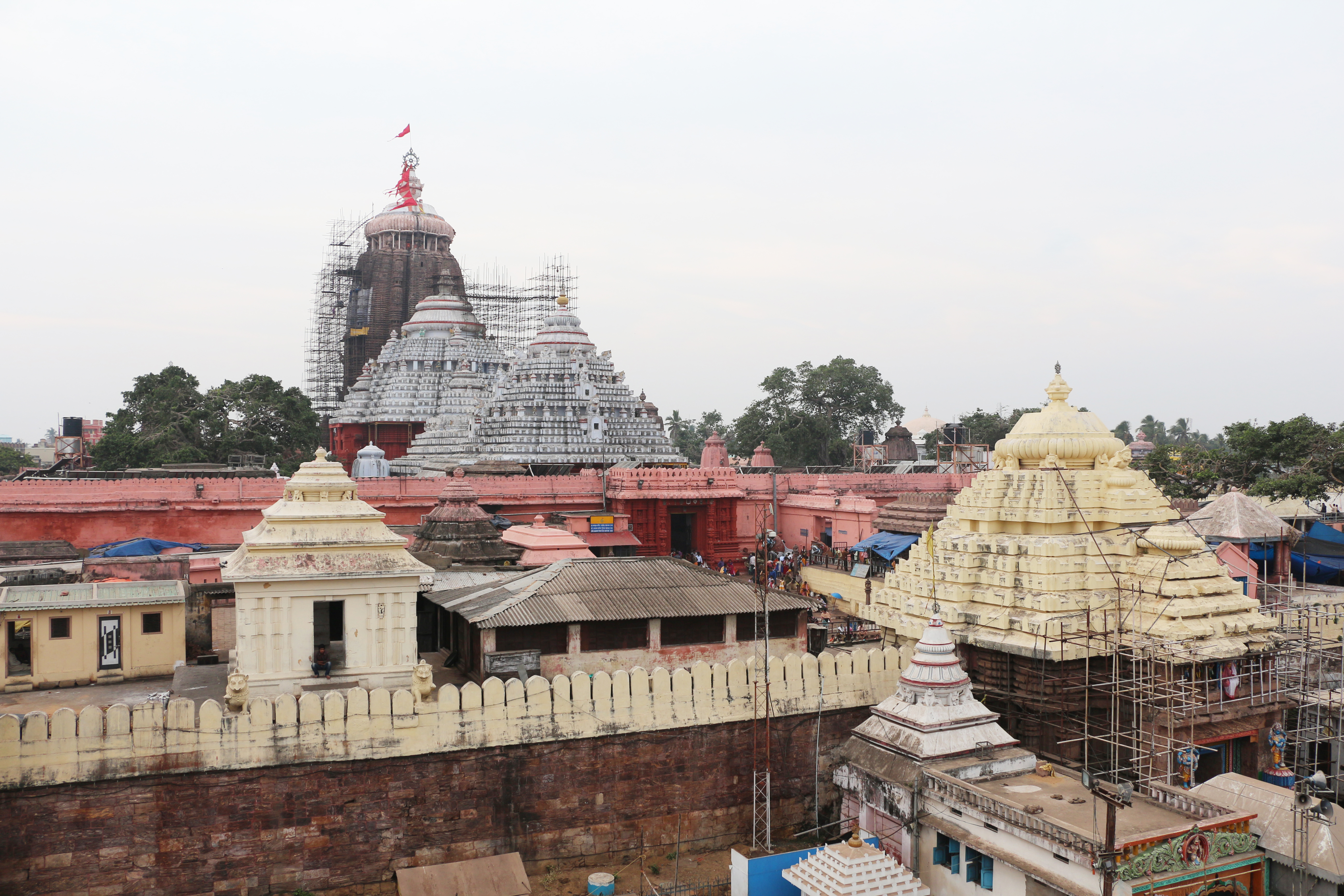
Jagannath Temple, Puri Panoramic View, Odisha.

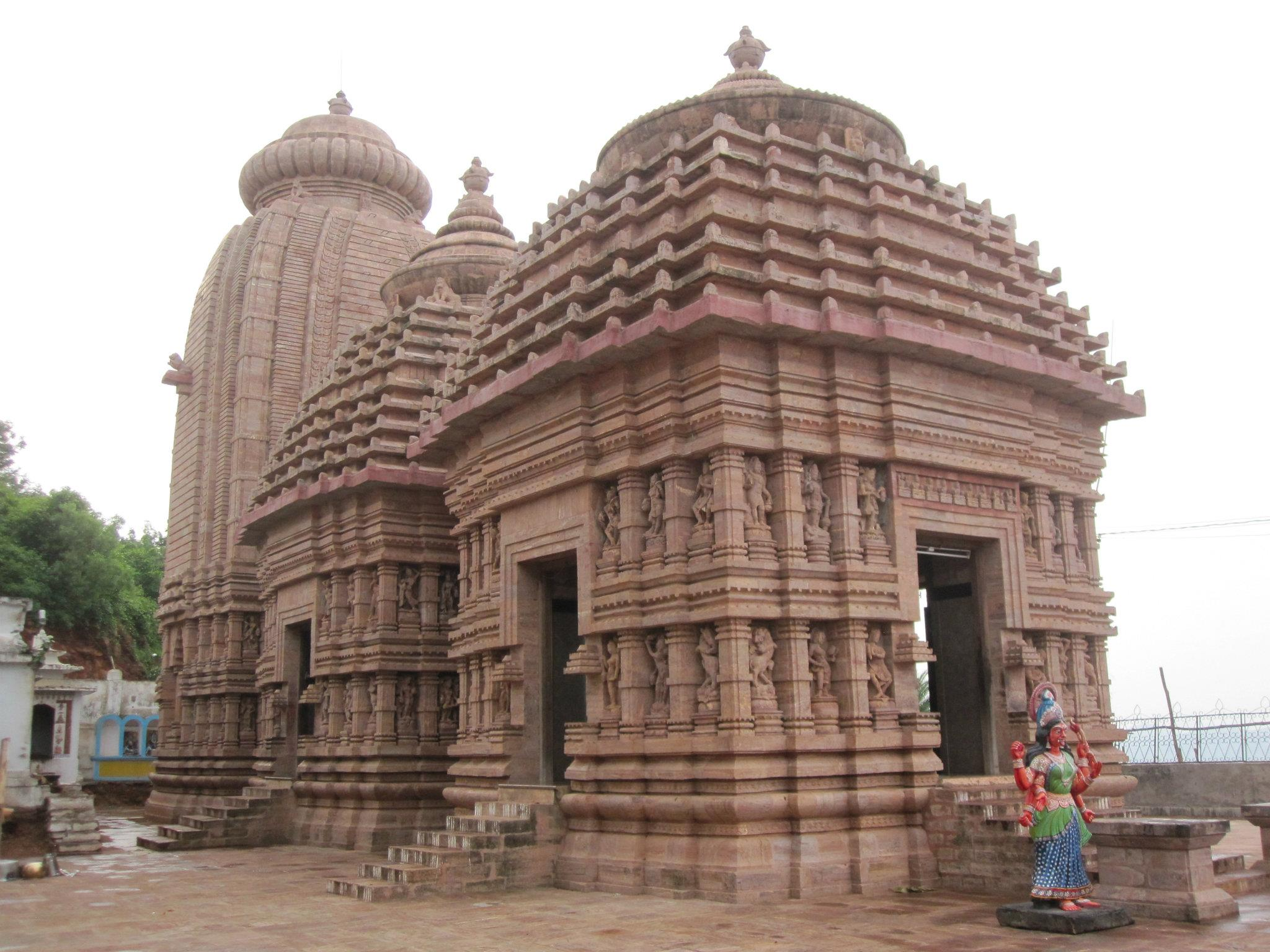
Taratarini Temple, Odisha.

Temple architecture in Odisha architecture has assumed a unique identity and evolved into the rock-cutting and wooden carved style which is also a very common style of Hindu temples in Andhra Pradesh and Telangana. In the older times in Odisha's history, the rulers used temples as symbol of respect to gods and their prosperity and hence gave special focus for the best style of Hindu temple architecture.
