= Karmanghat Hanuman Temple =

Hindu temple in Hyderabad, India

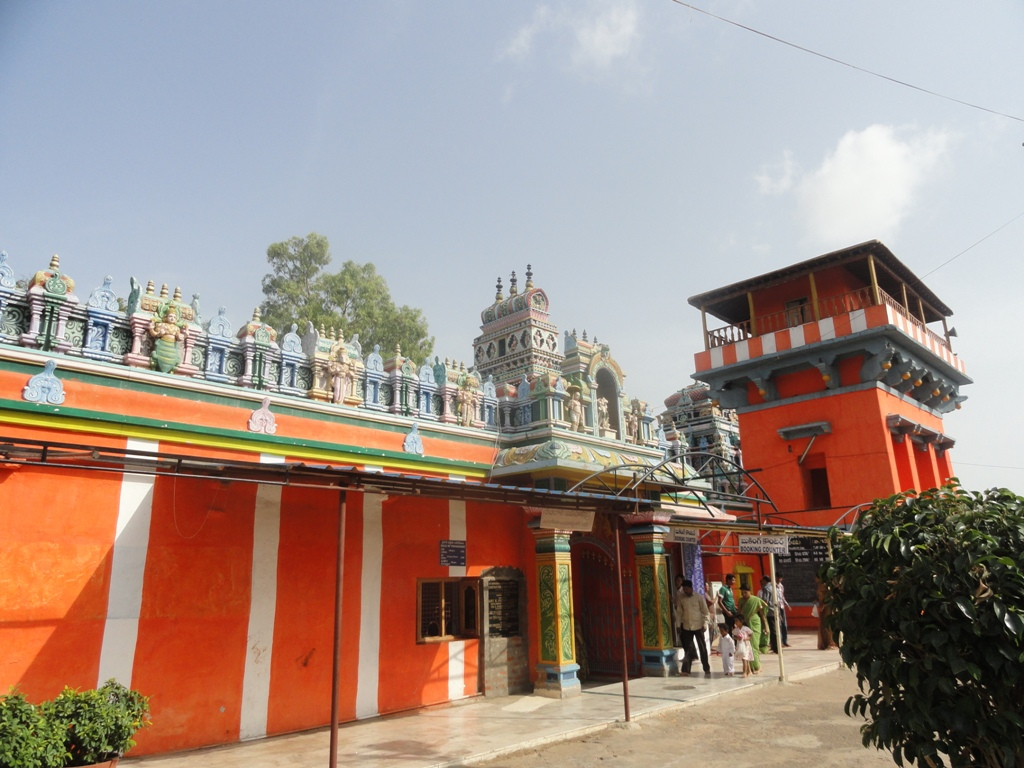

Religion
- Affiliation: Hinduism
- Deity: Hanuman

Location
- Location: Karmanghat, Hyderabad
- State: Telangana
- Country: India
- Interactive map of Karmanghat Hanuman Temple
- Coordinates: 17.339722°N 78.524722°E

Architecture
- Completed: 12th century CE

Website
- http://karmanghatsrihanumantemple.org/

The Karmanghat Hanuman Temple is a Hindu temple in Hyderabad in the state of Telangana, India. The presiding deity of the temple is Hanuman as Dhyana Anjaneya. The temple complex also houses other deities viz. Rama, Shiva, Saraswati, Durga, Santoshimata, Venugopala, and Jagannath. The temple is located at Karmanghat, near Santoshnagar and closer to the Nagarjuna Sagar Ring Road.

Temple is open from 6 am to 13 noon and 4:30 pm to 8:30 pm on all days except Tuesdays and Saturdays, where it is open from 5.30 am to 1 pm and 4:30 pm to 9 pm.

== History ==
It was built in c. 1198 CE. When the Kakatiya king Prola II went hunting and was resting under a tree, he heard the chanting of the god Rama's name. Looking for the source of the voice, he discovered a stone idol of the god Hanuman, in seated posture as the source. Having paid his respects, he returned to his capital, and that night, Hanuman is said to have appeared in his dream and asked him to construct a temple.

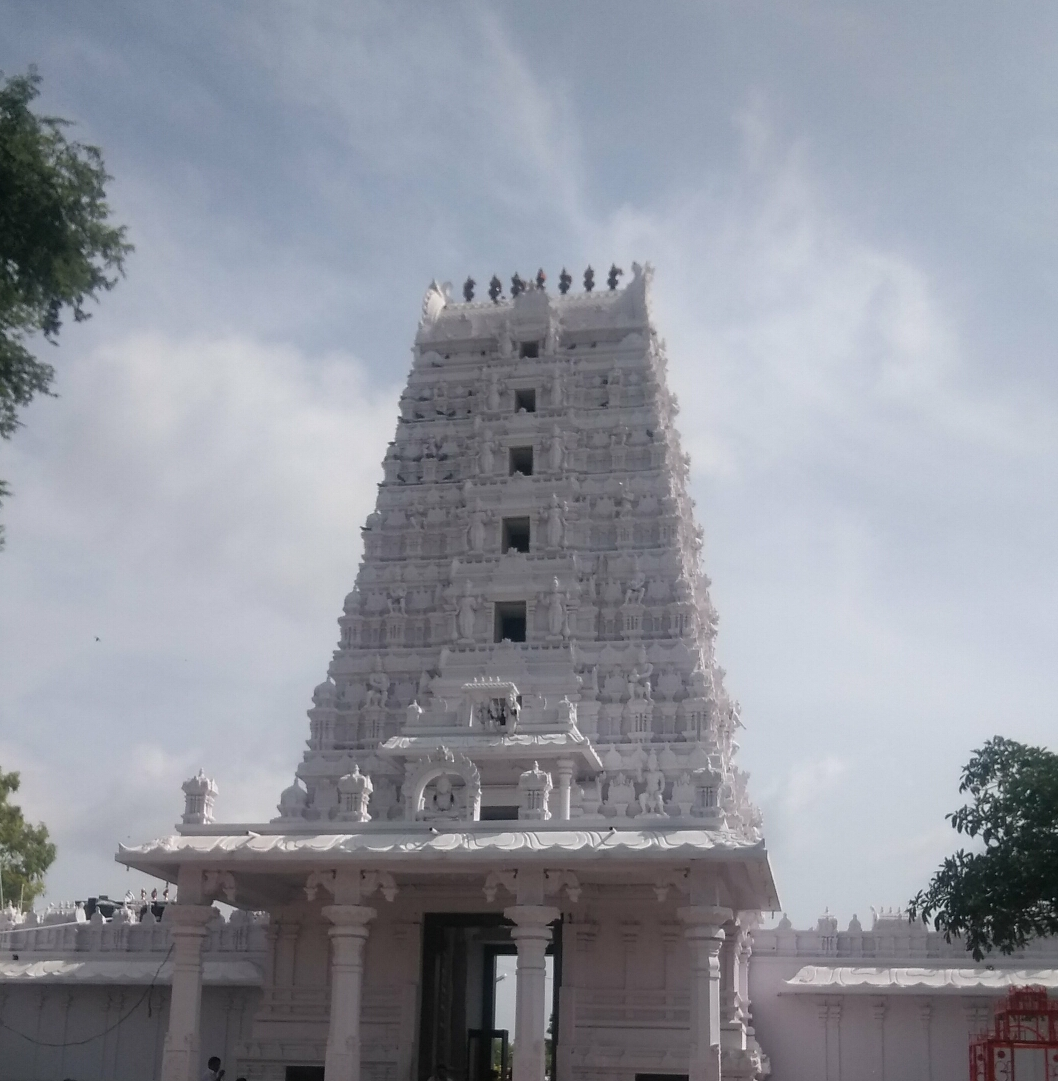
Karmanghat Temple Arch

== Present Day ==
The temple is very popular among devotees in Hyderabad. The devotees offer prayers and perform religious rituals for Hanuman at the temple on Tuesdays and Saturdays. On the auspicious day of Hanuman Jayanti (Hanuman's birthday), devotees visit the temple in large numbers to offer special pooja to the god. The temple management provides "annadanam" (free meal) to limited people on a daily basis.

== Referral ==
- Karmanghat Hanuman Temple Timings
