= Kondagattu Anjaneya Swamy Temple =

Hindu temple in Telangana, India

- కొండగట్టు ఆంజనేయస్వామి ఆలయం
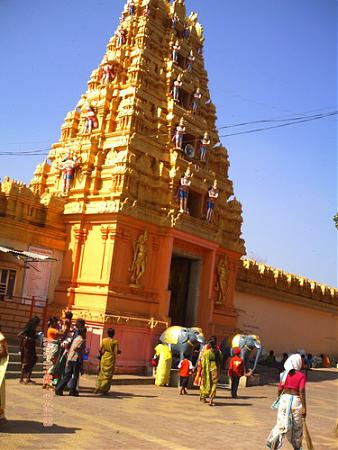

- Location within India

Religion
- Affiliation: Hinduism
- District: Jagitial
- Deity: Anjaneya Swamy

Location
- State: Telangana
- Country: India
- Coordinates: 18.4045°N 78.5521°E

Kondagattu Anjaneya Swamy Temple (Telugu: కొండగట్టు ఆంజనేయస్వామి ఆలయం) is a temple dedicated to Lord Anjaneya Swamy. It is one of the famous temples, located in Muthyumpeta village of Mallial mandal, Jagitial district, Telangana, India. It is located about 15 km from Jagtial, 35 km from Karimnagar.

== History ==
According to the folklore, the temple was constructed by a cowherd about 300 years ago. The present day temple was renovated 160 years ago by Krishna Rao Deshmukh. Besides the main deity Anjaneya swamy, the temple also has the idols of Lord Venkateswara, Goddess Alwaarula and Goddess Lakshmi.

Devotees believe that people who do not have children, when offer puja for 40 days at this temple, then they will be blessed with a child And Devotees believe that people who have mental disability or other health diseases, when offer puja for 40 days at this temple, then they will be cured.

== Transport ==
TSRTC operates buses to the temple from Karimnagar, Godavarikhani, Jagtial, and Asifabad bus depots. And frequently buses available from the famous lord shiva temple at Vemulavada to Kondagattu. Journey time from Vemulavada to Kondagattu is maximum one hour.
