= Demographics of Telangana =

Telangana state is the 12th most populous state in India, with a population of 35,003,674 as per 2011 Census, with a population density of 312 per km^{2}. The state has male and female population of 17,611,633 and 17,392,041 respectively with sex ratio (Females per 1000 Males) standing at 988. Decadal Growth Rate (2001-2011) Rate is 13.58%.

== General statistics ==
Data pulled from Socio Economic Outlook of Telangana 2023.

Population of Telangana State from 1961 to 2011 (in Nos.)

Year	1961	1971	1981	1991	2001	2011	2025
Telangana	12,711,785	15,817,895	20,181,085	26,089,074	30,987,271	35,003,674	38,499,000
India	439,234,771	548,159,652	683,329,097	846,421,039	1,028,610,328	1,210,854,977	

Percentage of Urban Population to total Population from 1961 to 2011

Year	1961	1971	1981	1991	2001	2011
Telangana	19.27	20.99	25.27	30.18	31.79	38.88
India	17.97	17.98	19.51	22.87	25.49	31.15

== Religion ==
Religion in Telangana
Religion	2001	%	2011 (Note: Area which became present-day Telangana excluding mandals transferred to Andhra Pradesh. Figures for Burgampadu mandal were calculated by assuming proportion of religion in transferred area is the same as in rural areas of the whole mandal.)	%
Hinduism	26,630,949	85.95	29,764,205	85.03
Islam	3,853,213	12.43	4,461,566	12.75
Christianity	384,373	1.24	445,198	1.27
Buddhism	29,628	0.10	32,553	0.09
Sikhism	23,821	0.08	30,340	0.09
Jainism	19,959	0.06	26,690	0.08
Other	3,082	0.00	4,975	0.01
Not stated	42,246	0.14	238,147	0.68
Total	30,987,271	100	35,003,674	100

=== Religion in urban areas ===
Religious Population Percentage for major cities of Telangana State, India.

City	Population	Hindus %	Muslims %	Christians %	Others† %
Adilabad	117,167	59.37	35.59	0.83	4.21
Hyderabad	6,993,262	64.93	30.13	2.76	2.18
Karimnagar	289,821	77.10	20.71	1.30	0.89
Khammam	196,283	81.59	15.98	2.00	0.43
Mahbubnagar	190,400	63.75	33.72	1.88	0.65
Nalgonda	154,326	78.63	19.26	1.74	0.37
Nizamabad	311,152	59.77	38.01	1.13	1.09
Ramagundam	242,979	88.60	9.68	1.22	0.50
Suryapet	106,805	86.28	10.47	2.07	1.18
Warangal	704,570	83.41	14.39	1.65	0.55

† includes Buddhist, Sikhs etc.

Source: Cities with population of 1 Lakh and Above

== Languages ==
Languages of Telangana (2011)
1. Telugu (75.5%)
2. Urdu (12.3%)
3. Lambadi (5.55%)
4. Marathi (1.77%)
5. Hindi (1.52%)
6. Others (3.33%)

At the time of the 2011 census, 75.51% of the population in present-day Telangana (Note: Area which became present-day Telangana excluding mandals transferred to Andhra Pradesh. Figures for Burgampadu mandal were calculated by assuming proportion of languages in transferred area is the same as in rural areas of the whole mandal.) spoke Telugu, 12.17% Urdu, 5.55% Lambadi, 1.77% Marathi and 1.52% Hindi as their first language.

== See also ==
- List of cities in Telangana by area
