= Ramalingeswara Temple, Nandikandi =

Hindu Temple

Coordinates: 17°36′36″N 77°59′31″E

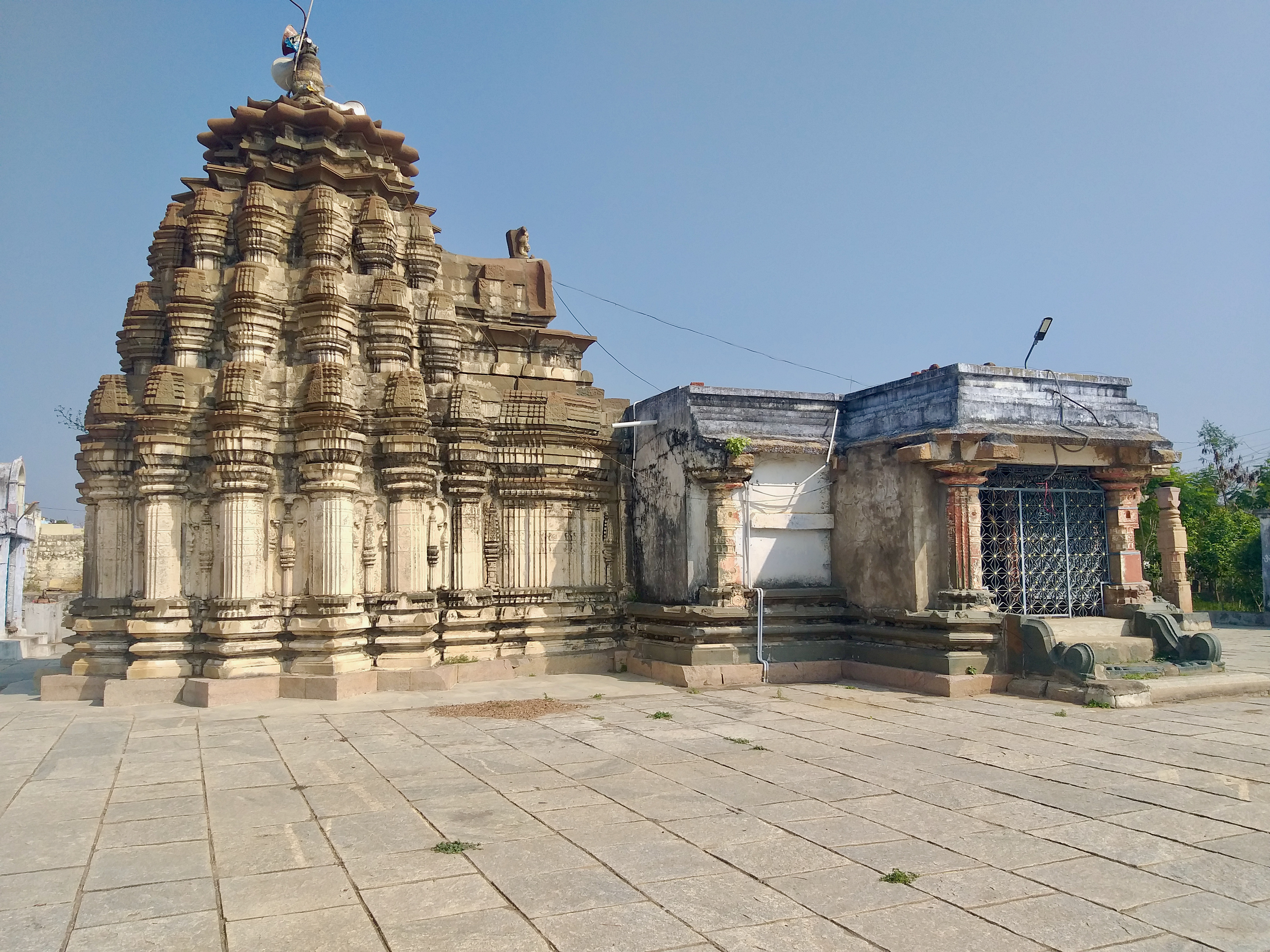

Religion
- Affiliation: Hinduism
- Deity: Shiva

Location
- Country: India

Ramalingeswara Temple is a temple located in Nandikandi, which is a village in the Sangareddy district, Telangana, India.

== History ==
The temple was built by the Kalyani Chaulukyas.

== Description ==
The shikhara is constructed with the Bhumija style, and the sanctum is star-shaped.

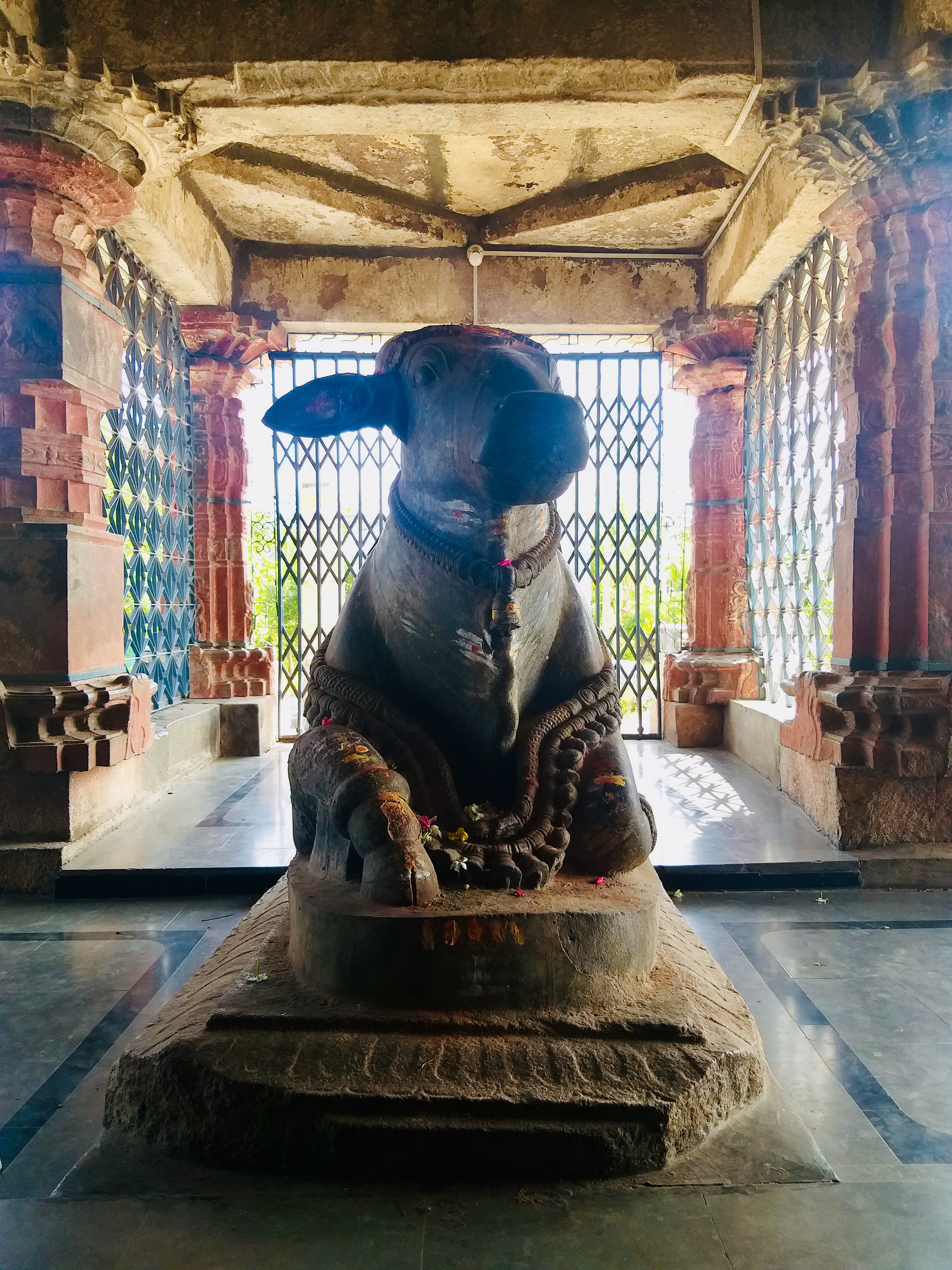
Sculpture of Nandi within the temple

== Location ==
The temple is located less than a kilometer away from the National Highway 65.
