= Politics of Telangana =

Political system of Telangana

The Indian state of Telangana was founded in 2014. Its territory had formerly been part of Andhra Pradesh. The Telangana movement was instrumental in the creation of the new state, and Bharat Rashtra Samithi (previously, Telangana Rashtra Samithi), a party which led the Telangana movement after 2001, formed the government in the Telangana Legislative Assembly under its leader K. Chandrashekar Rao as the 1st Chief Minister of the state. The political landscape of Telangana is dominated by the Indian National Congress and the Bharat Rashtra Samithi, with the Bharatiya Janata Party and the All India Majlis-e-Ittehadul Muslimeen being other significant forces.

The Indian National Congress draws most of its strength from rural areas whereas the Bharat Rashtra Samithi and All India Majlis-e-Ittehadul Muslimeen have their strongholds in the GHMC and surrounding areas. The Bharatiya Janata Party has increased its vote base in recent years.

The Telugu Desam Party and the YSR Congress Party also used to have major sway in the state, although they have since lost most of their presence, and have been limited to residual Andhra Pradesh.

The incumbent Chief Minister of the state is Revanth Reddy from the Indian National Congress.

== Telangana movement ==
In the early Telangana movement, Marri Chenna Reddy formed a party called Telangana Praja Samithi to lead the Telangana movement. In November 1969, there was a major split in the party and as a result the movement declined. After two years the Telangana Praja Samithi was dissolved and its members rejoined the Congress.

A successor party, Telangana Rashtra Samithi, was formed in 2001 by Kalvakuntla Chandrashekar Rao (KCR). On 29 November 2009, KCR started a fast-unto-death, demanding that the Congress party introduce a Telangana bill in Parliament. Student organisations, employee unions, and various organisations joined the movement. As general strikes shut down much economic activity in Telangana, Telangana Bill was passed in Lok Sabha on 18 February 2014 and in Rajya Sabha on 18 February 2014. On 4 March 2014 the Government of India declared that 2 June would be the Telangana Formation Day.

== Elections ==
The 2014 Andhra Pradesh Legislative Assembly election was held in united Andhra Pradesh state shortly before the formation of Telangana, on 30 April 2014. The results were declared on 16 May 2014, with Telangana Rashtra Samithi having won an overall majority within Telangana. This party went on to lead the first Government of Telangana when the Telangana Legislative Assembly was established, and won an increased majority in the 2018 Telangana Legislative Assembly election. Chandrashekar Rao has been Chief Minister throughout. The leading opposition party has been the Indian National Congress, and other challengers include the Telugu Desam Party and the All India Majlis-e-Ittehadul Muslimeen, Bharatiya Janata Party.after 2018 assembly elections in the year of 2019 formed a new political party named India Janshakti Party founded by Awadesh Panty, Nilesh takhar from Uttar Pradesh and Telangana Activist and contested independent Karimnagar assembly 2018 candidate (Pot symbol)Bandi Srinivas, present he was Telangana state President In 2023 Telangana Legislative Assembly election Congress won the elections with an absolute majority. The opposition parties include the BRS, the Bharatiya Janata Party and AIMIM.

== Main Political Parties ==
- Indian National Congress
- Bharatiya Janata Party
- Bharat Rashtra Samithi
- All India Majlis-e-Ittehadul Muslimeen
- Telugu Desam Party
- Majlis Bachao Tehreek
- Bahujan Samaj Party
- Communist Party of India (Marxist)
- Communist Party of India
- Telangana Jana Samithi
- All India Forward Bloc
- Lok Satta Party
- Jana Sena Party

== Footnotes ==
- Telangana Politics EtG
