= Devunigutta Temple =

Hindu temple in Telangana, India

- దేవునిగుట్ట దేవాలయం (Telugu)
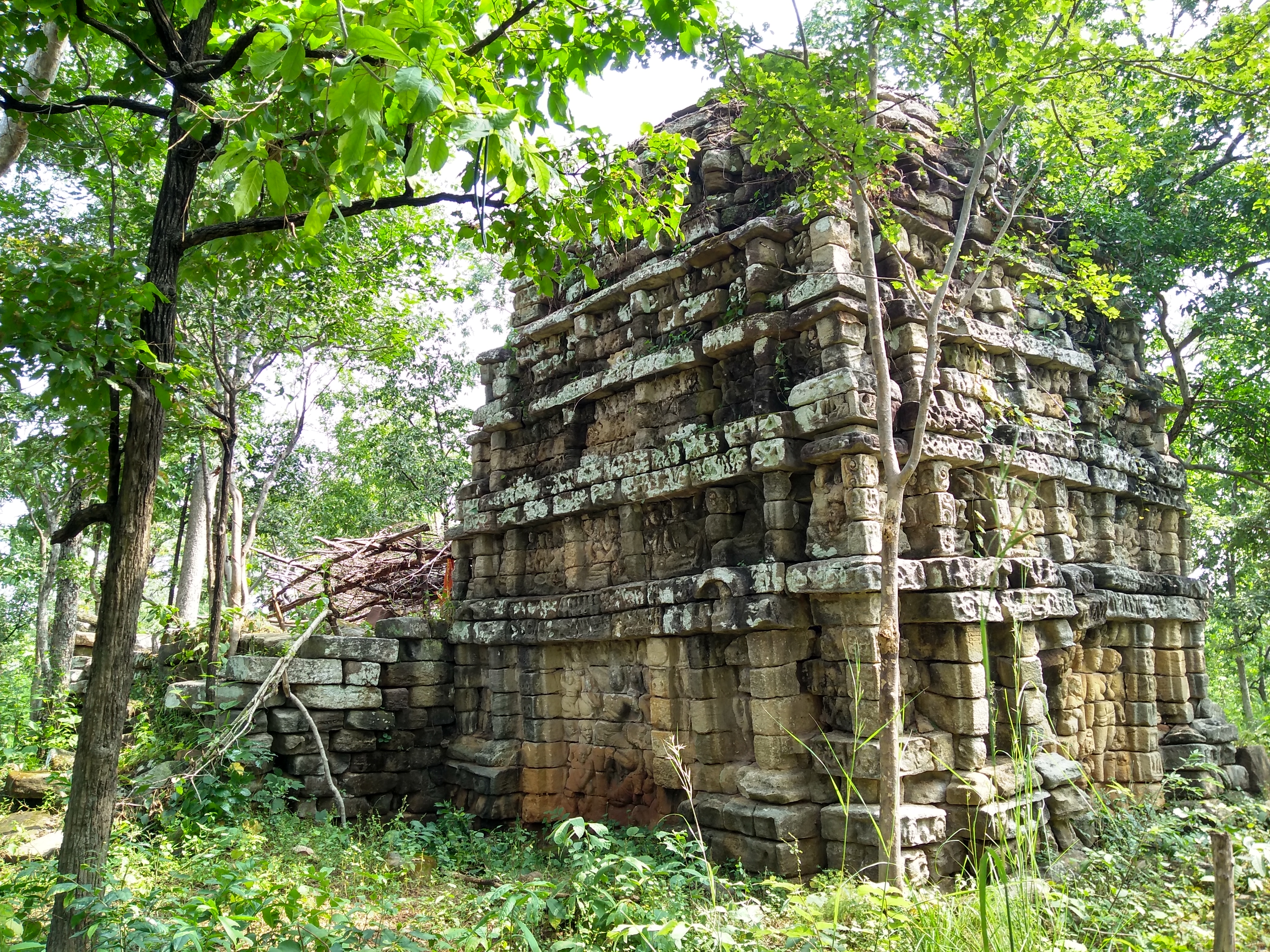
- Devunigutta Temple, north and west sides, c. 2017

- Location within India Location within Telangana
- 18°6′54.6″N 80°02′13.3″E
- Location: Jayashankar Bhupalpally district, Telangana, India

History
- Built: 6th century CE

Site notes
- Architectural style: Hindu temple architecture

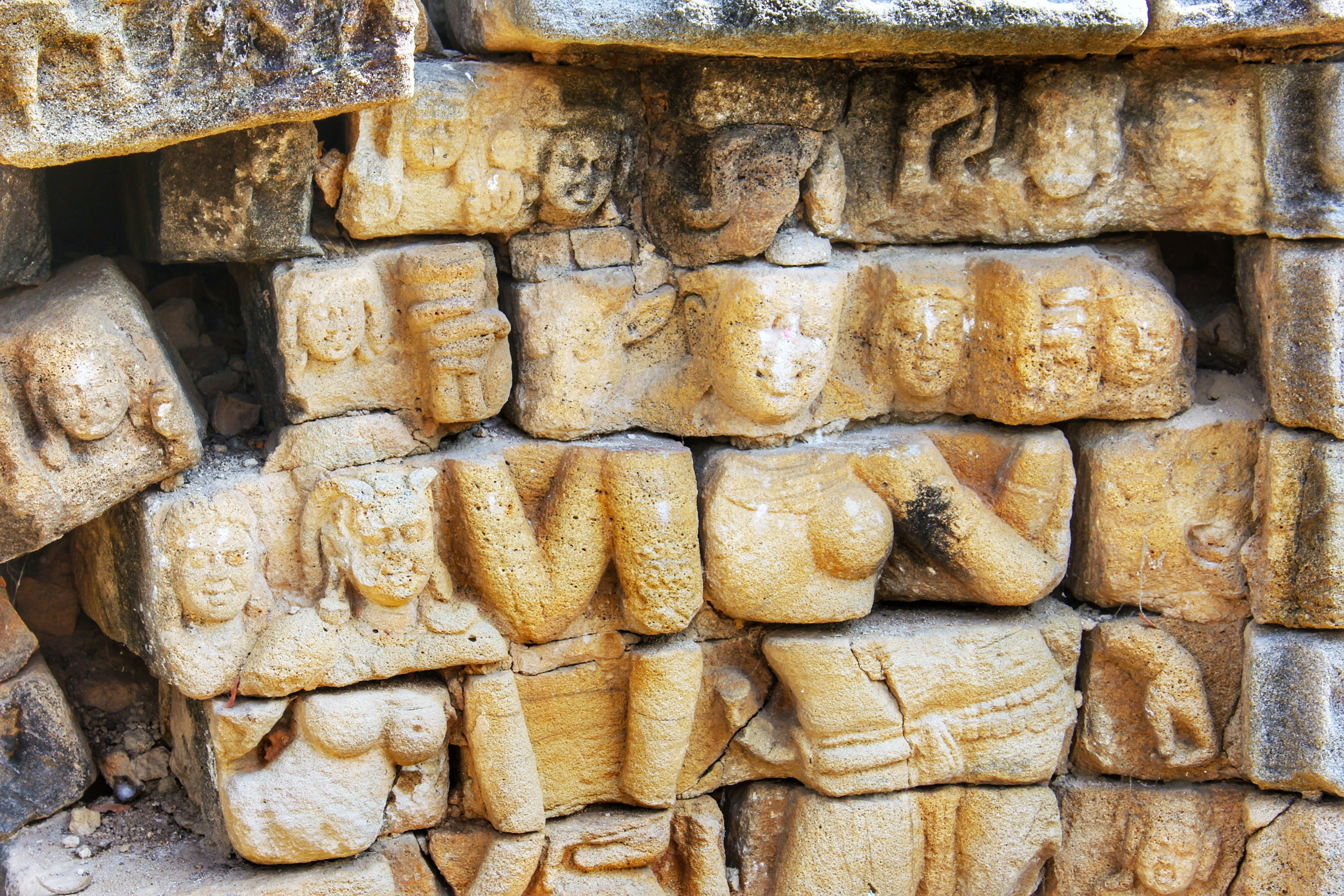
Relief sculptures on the outside west wall of the temple; Ardhanarishvara (with a single breast) and other figures

The Devunigutta Temple ("God’s hill" in Telugu) or Shiva Temple, Kothur is a Hindu temple near Kothur village in the Mulugu District, Telangana, India, some 60 km east of Warangal. Located in a remote forested plateau, it was probably built c. 6th century CE by the Vakatakas. It was first recorded in 2012, in an abandoned state, by the Archaeological Survey of India (ASI); however, it did not come to wider attention until images were posted on social media in 2017.

The temple now consists of a square sanctuary with a shikhara or vimana tower, with the sanctuary open to the interior of the tower, and a low wall enclosing an entrance court. An unusual profusion of relief sculptures, though very worn, are located both inside and outside. Visiting international scholars, as well as local people, have expressed concern about the condition of the building. Local voluntary groups cleared the vegetation growing on the actual structure, although by 2020 much had regrown. In late 2019 the Archaeological Survey of India was ready to restore the temple, but was awaiting permission from the local authorities.

An image of Narashima was installed after 2012, and the temple is in informal worship.

== Rediscovery ==
Although apparently reported to the ASI in 2012, the temple attracted little attention until photographs were posted on social media in 2017. An Assistant Director of Archaeology and Museums for Telangana state visited the temple in August 2017, and "submitted a report stressing the need to conserve the temple", but as of early 2019 no action had been taken.

A German art historian, Corinna Wessels-Mevissen, who saw the temple in 2018, said “The temple is a unique blend of styles visible in Udayagiri and Scandagiri in Odisha and also a bit of Amaravati like (Andhra Pradesh) architecture.”

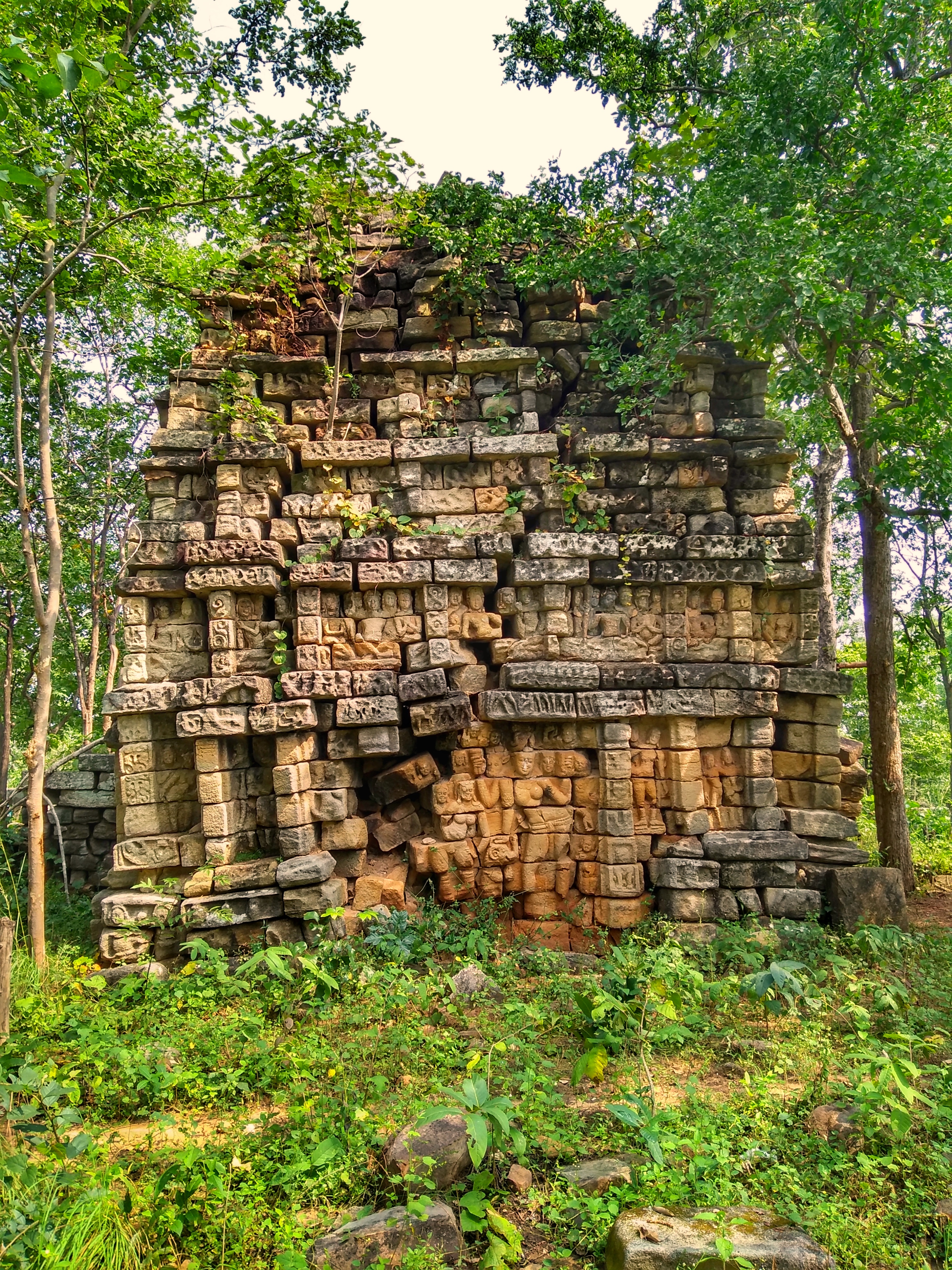
The tower from behind (west face), showing the "cleft" in the wall.

A British expert, Adam Hardy, who visited the temple in 2019, described it as "a unique temple with a rare architecture full of imagery and a depiction of a heavenly vision in sculpture", though he dismissed claims of resemblance to Angkor Wat, saying Devunigutta was in any case older, probably from the 6th century. He was reported as saying "It’s high time the Archaeological Department take the necessary steps to protect the temple which is beginning to collapse."

Corinna Wessels-Mevissen gave a brief report on the temple to a conference in Naples in 2018, and she and Adam Hardy published a paper on it in 2019. Laxshmi Greaves, a colleague of Hardy at Cardiff University, visited the temple separately in 2018, and published an account.

== Architecture ==
The temple has a single enclosed space, about 6 metres square, and now 7 metres high; it is missing the kalasha urn or amalaka that would once have topped it. It is built of blocks of sandstone that have eroded considerably. The blocks are closely fitted, but there are traces of mortar, and a few of reddish stucco, which probably originally covered all the reliefs, and may have been painted. Apart from erosion of the stone, the temple seems generally well-preserved, apart from damage above the entrance and a "long vertical cleft" running down the west wall, which has disrupted the left side of the exterior relief panel with Ardhanarishvara (illustrated). The low wall marking an enclosure in front of the temple is probably not original, and is rather crudely constructed of similar blocks, perhaps originally used for another structure.

A very unusual feature in Hindu temple architecture is that the sanctuary has no ceiling, and visitors can look straight up inside the corbelled shikara/vimana. This is a feature shared with the Gop Temple of about 550 on the other side of India in Gujarat. Usually the flat and unornamented ceiling of the sanctuary is an essential part of the "cave and mountain" architectural metaphor of a Hindu temple. This may relate to apparently wooden temples with octagonal towers seen in some Buddhist reliefs. Wessels-Mevissen and Hardy conclude the temple's "unique architecture provides a missing link between early timber structures and the Dråvida tradition".

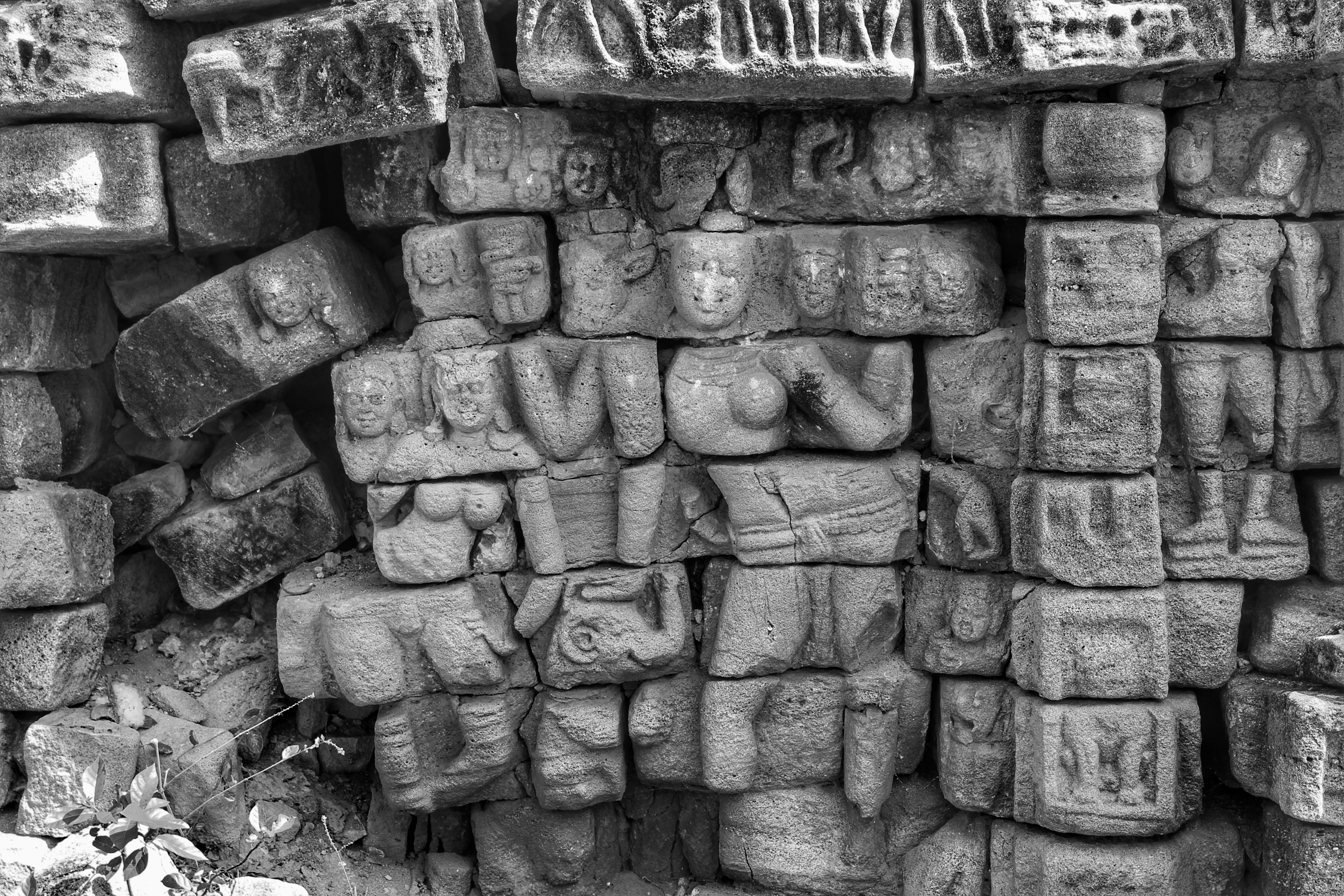
The external Ardhanarishvara group in 2019

The tower has four tiers, "defined by relief-encrusted string courses", which on the upper tiers are "divided rather haphazardly into bays by plain pilasters". The tower is topped by a low corbelled dome. There is a central projection or bhadra extending across most of each face of the tower. At the lowest level each side except for the east entrance has "a spectacular mythological panel" above a simple moulding. Pilasters make a number of small aedicules, and there are gavakshas at many places, often with faces inside them.

Inside there is now a modern plinth holding an image of Narashima, but no sign of a lingam, nor of a drainage channel for offerings. Local people say a lingam was stolen some time ago.

Leaning against the wall of the enclosed courtyard are three white limestone fragments, one of which appears to be a post from a carved railing typical of Buddhist stupas (e.g., Amaravati Stupa, though these are much larger), although no stupas are known to have existed within 100 km of the temple. They may have been brought to the site as a source of lime for the mortar, or to decorate it.

== Reliefs ==
Reliefs carved into the structural blocks cover "almost every available surface", both inside and out. Though early press reports dwelled on Buddhist-like aspects of the temple, it is clearly a Hindu temple dedicated to Shiva, who appears prominently in the composite form of Ardhanarishvara, divided between his male form and the female one of Parvati, his consort. Ardhanarishvara appears centrally on the reliefs on both the inside and outside of the rear (west) wall of the sanctuary, a feature not known elsewhere.

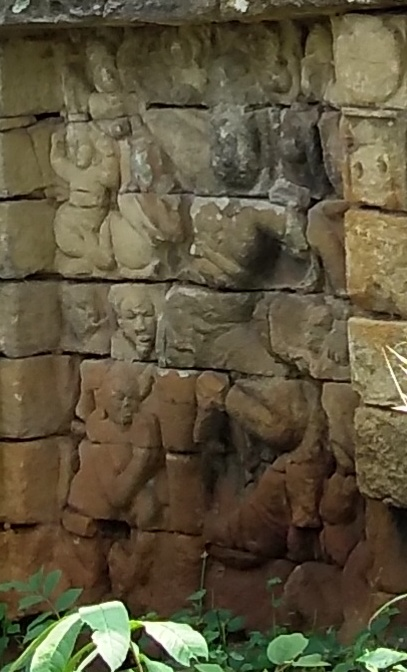
Balarama group on the north exterior wall

The large relief groups "exhibit a homogenous sculptural style essentially reminiscent of Gupta art and other sculptural idioms present in this early period" although the site is a long way from areas controlled by the Gupta Empire by the 460s. They are crowded with figures, above all the very large group occupying the back wall of the sanctuary. The reliefs have many unusual iconographic features, and not all the subjects are yet clear. Together they suggest "the spread of a pre-Tantric form of ascetic Saivism to the South of India".

=== The three large exterior groups ===
The Ardhanarishvara group on the outside rear (east) wall has unusual features. Ardhanarishvara, though in a composite male/female form and much the largest figure, has a relatively large female figure on the viewer's left, perhaps a consort. A small elephant-headed Ganesha, child of Shiva and Parvati, is being patted on the head by the figure representing his parents. Both of these features are very unusual; that the figure has four arms is typical. Two other hands hold a lotus flower and a square mirror, and the last is over the head of what may be Skanda, another son of Shiva and Parvati, as a child. The group includes several other rather smaller figures. A bovine head representing Shiva's vahana or "vehicle", the bull Nandi, is seen at the left of his head; the same feature appears on the large south wall relief.

The large group on the exterior north wall probably shows Balarama defeating the evil asura Pralambasura, with his right arm raised to strike the fatal blow to the figure below him, whose head he holds, while his knee presses into his back. To the left of the panel two male worshippers are squatting. Around Balarama's head are four ayudhapurusha figures, personified divine weapons normally associated with Vishnu, a very unusual feature.

The large group on the exterior south wall is "difficult to interpret". It probably shows Shiva in the "royal ease" position, flanked by a male and female figure, and with a dwarf kneeling below him. The male figure appears to touch Shiva's raised foot in a gesture of respect. Next to Shiva's head is another bovine head, and there are a number of other figures, including small flying attendants. Greaves interprets this scene as "Śiva trampling on the demon of ignorance".

=== Reliefs on the interior walls ===
Almost the whole of the inside west (rear) wall is occupied with a large relief, crowded with figures in three registers, but with "no apparent visual narrative [that] connects all these images". A large standing two-armed Ardhanarishvara is placed centrally at a low level, with Shiva and Parvati seated above, probably shown in their mountain home on Mount Kailasa, with Nandi. Other figures appear to represent devotees, ascetics, yogis and penitents, perhaps including the temple donors. The side walls show similar scenes.

=== Other reliefs ===
The very many smaller reliefs on the exterior walls include, on the first upper level of the west wall, a group of Lakulisha, seated and holding his large mace, with his four disciples, as well as a sixth head at the far right edge, "probably as a kind of 'witness'". There is a comparable group in Cave Temple No. 2 at the Badami Caves in Karnataka, Early Chalukya dynasty, from around 550–570, though there Lakulisha is four-armed and ithyphallic (the latter usual for him at this period); at Devunigutta he is neither.

Other scenes and figures include loving couples (mithunas) and detailed small-scale battle scenes on the horizontal string course blocks separating the upper levels, with infantry, chariots and war-elephants.

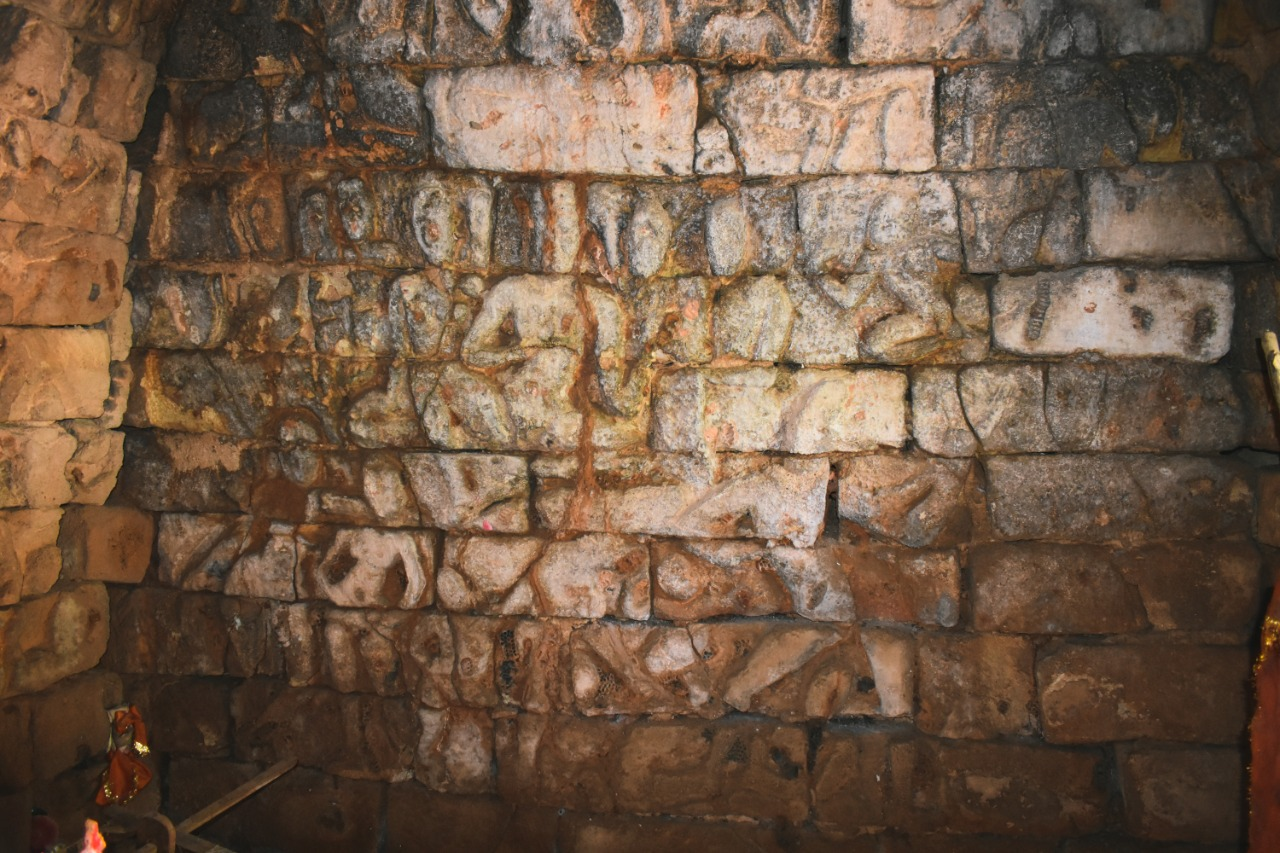
The worn relief on the inside back (west) wall

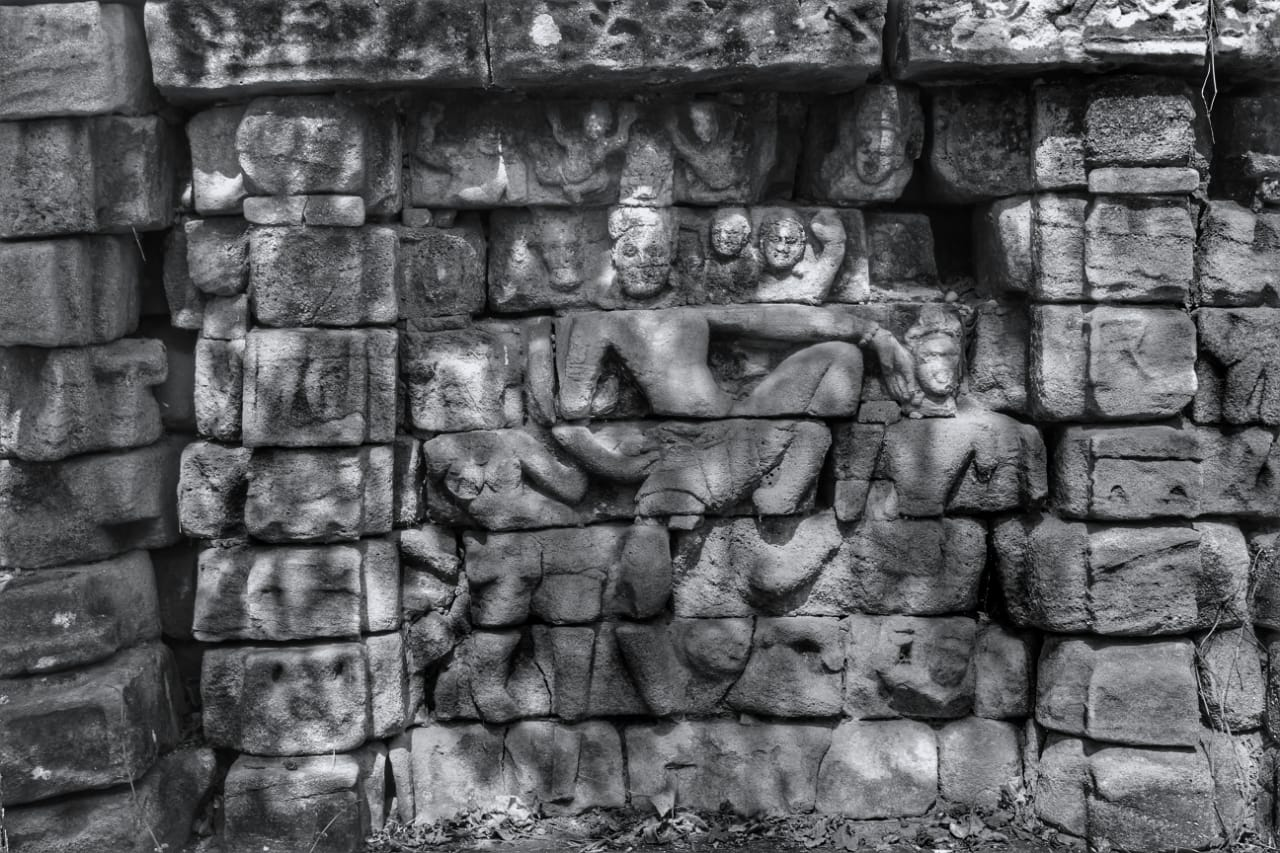
Outside south wall group, probably Shiva and companions

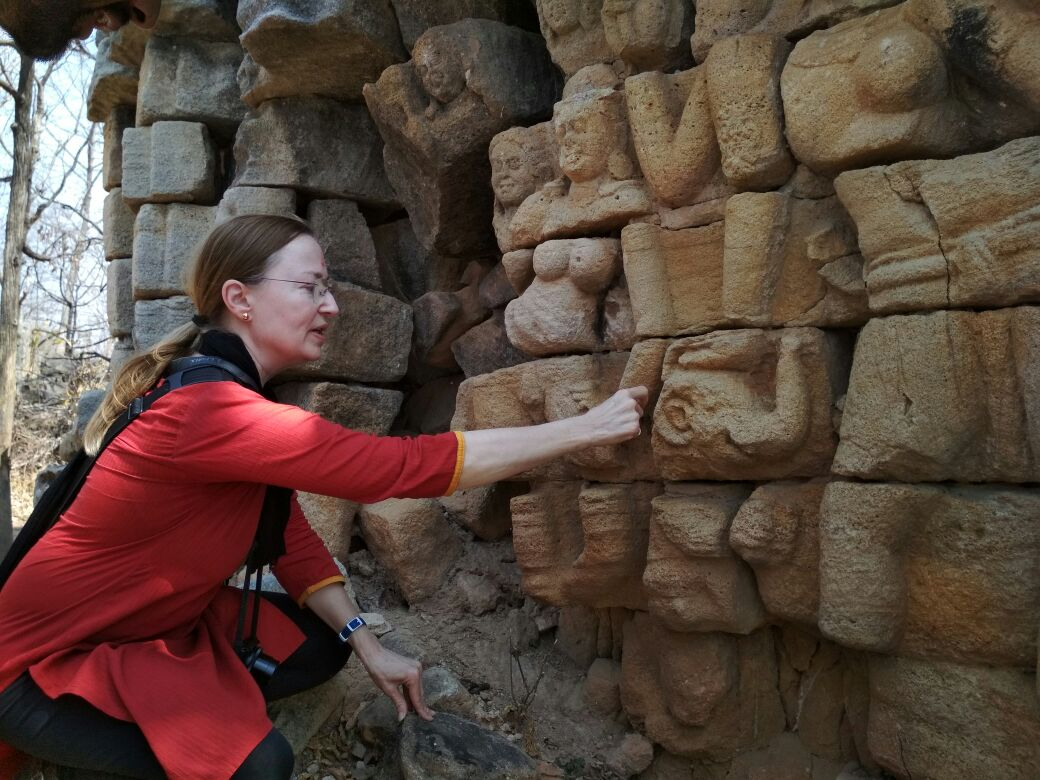
Corinna Wessels-Mevissen examining the temple

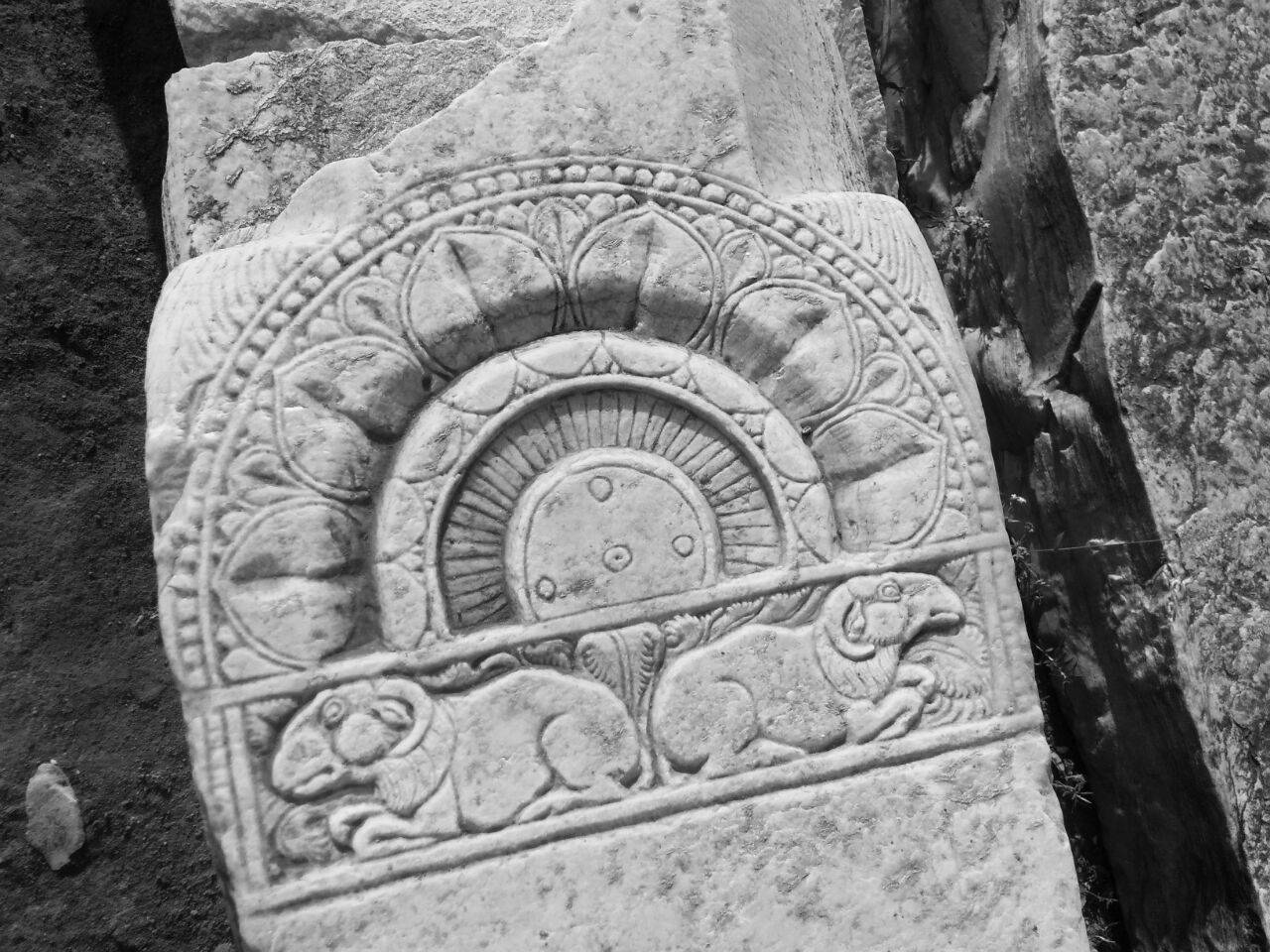
The probable post from a carved railing of a Buddhist stupa, in the courtyard

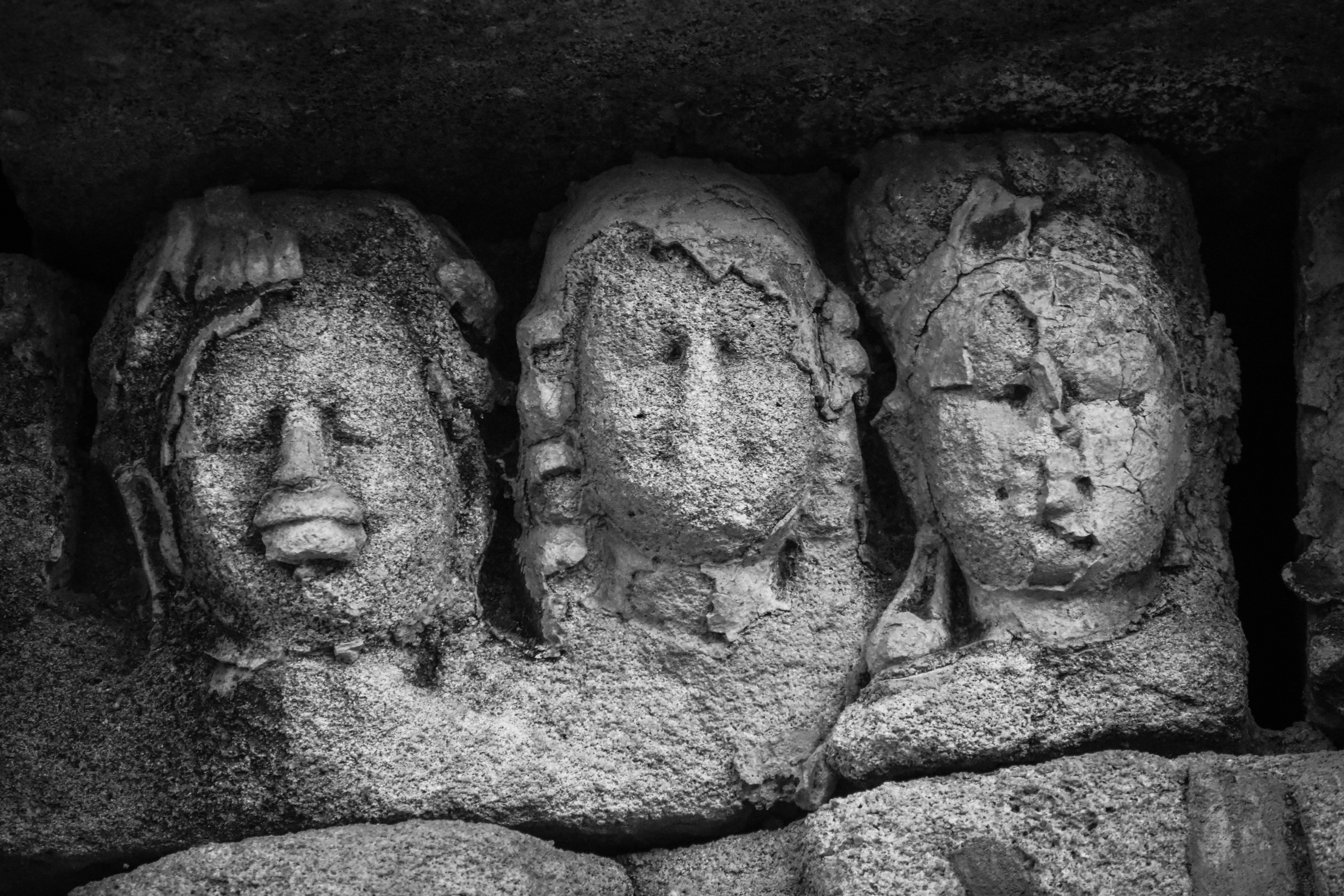
Small heads on a higher level

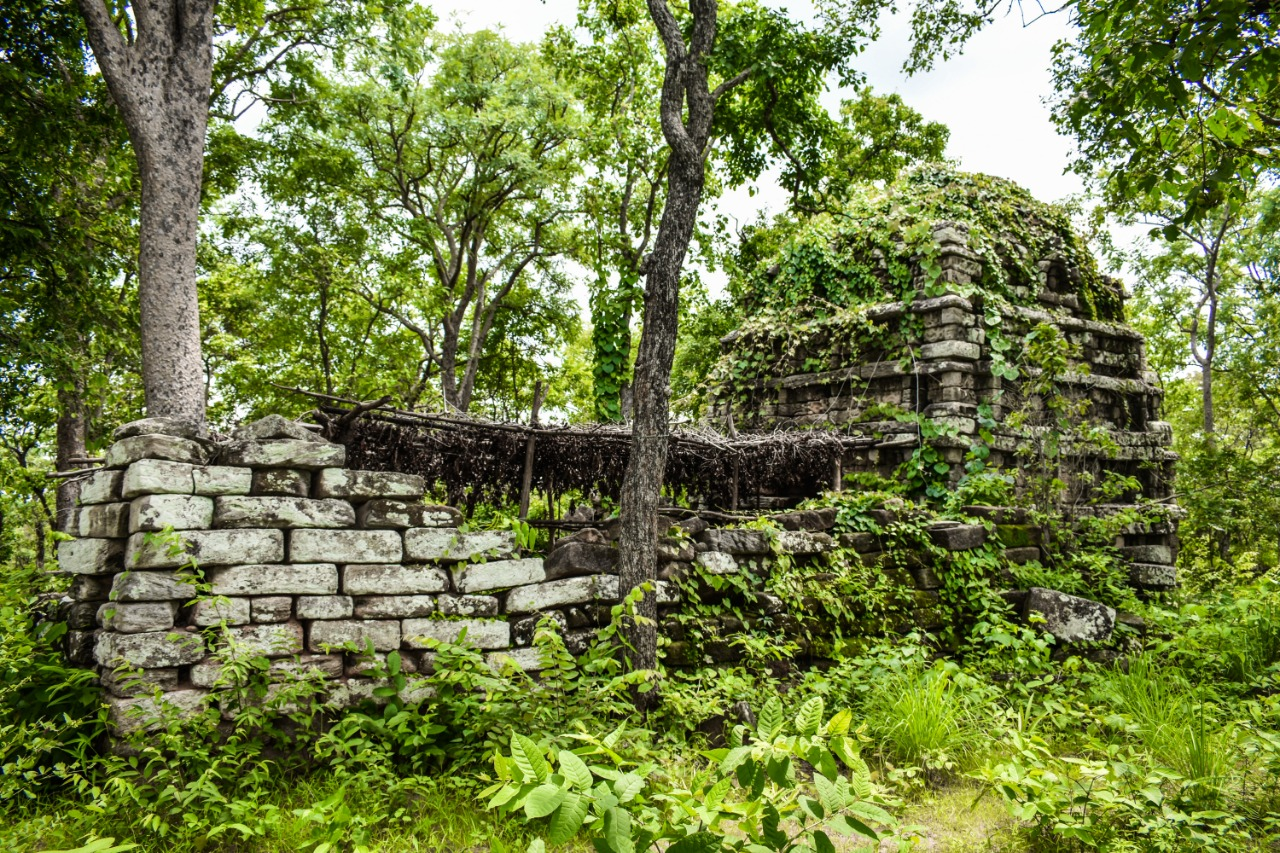
From the front, 2020
