= Flora of Telangana =

The Flora of Telangana are a range of vascular plants found in Telangana, India. The state has a total of 2,800 taxa belonging to 1,051 genera under 185 families. The state's three general soil types (red, black and laterite) and tropical monsoon climate allows for a wide variety of plants.

== Plant diversity ==
Telangana is a landlocked state in the south of India, with an area of 114,840 square kilometres (44,340 sq mi). The forests consist of tropical moist deciduous forests, southern dry deciduous forests, northern mixed dry deciduous forests, dry savanna forests and tropical dry evergreen scrub.

Typical tree species include Tectona grandis, Anogeissus latifolia, Boswellia serrata, Butea monosperma, Cochlospermum religiosum, Diospyros melanoxylon, Gardenia latifolia, and Haldina cordifolia.

The largest families in Telangana include Fabaceae with 273 species, Poaceae with 208 species, Cyperaceae with 126 species, Euphorbiaceae with 118 species, Asteraceae with 84 species, and Acanthaceae with 60.

Endemic plants in the state include Abelmoschus manihot, Abutilon neelgherrense, Aglaia elaeagnoidea, Andrographis serpyllifoila, Arthraxon lanceolatus, Senna montana, Sesbania procumbens, Syzygium heyneanum, Terminalia coriacea, Tricholepis radicans, Vetiveria lawsonii, Wendlandia gamblei and Zingiber roseum.

== Recent discoveries ==
New species were discovered native and endemic to Telangana, including Alysicarpus gautalensis, Diplacrum poklei, Eragrostis macilenta, Habenaria furcifera, Heterostemma disciflorum, Lindernia procumbens, Murdannia dimorpha, Phyllanthus gardnerianus, and Vigna umbellata.

In 2026, a new species of the family Lythraceae, Ammannia telanganensis, was discovered in water bodies and wet areas in Rangareddy district and the Amrabad Tiger Reserve in Nagarkurnool district.
