= List of pharmaceutical manufacturers in the United Kingdom =

This is a list of manufacturers and suppliers of pharmaceuticals with operations in the United Kingdom.

Note: the activities of the parent companies of many of the companies listed below are not restricted solely to the United Kingdom. For example, AstraZeneca and GlaxoSmithKline, although headquartered in the United Kingdom, have activities in numerous other countries, and Johnson & Johnson and Pfizer are both headquartered in the United States and have activities in many countries worldwide.

Brand name of company – formal registered title of company

- A&H – Allen & Hanburys Ltd
- Abbott – Abbott Laboratories Inc.
- Accord – Accord Healthcare Ltd.
- Actelion – Actelion Pharmaceuticals UK Ltd
- Aesica pharmaceuticals - Aesica Queenborough Ltd
- Air Products – Air Products plc
- Alcon – Alcon Laboratories (UK) Ltd
- ALK-Abelló – ALK-Abelló (UK) Ltd
- Allergan – Allergan Ltd
- Alpharma – King Pharmaceuticals
- Almus Pharmaceuticals - Walgreens Boots Alliance
- Altana – Altana Pharma Ltd
- Amgen – Amgen Ltd
- APS – TEVA UK Ltd
- Assertio – Assertio Therapeutics, Inc
- AstraZeneca – AstraZeneca UK Limited
- Aventis Pharma – Sanofi-Aventis Ltd
- Bausch & Lomb – Bausch & Lomb UK Ltd
- Baxter – Baxter International
- Baxter BioScience – Baxter International
- Bayer – Bayer plc (Pharmaceutical Division)
- Becton Dickinson – Becton Dickinson UK Ltd
- Beiersdorf – Beiersdorf UK Ltd
- Berk – TEVA UK Ltd
- Biogen – Biogen Idec
- Boehringer Ingelheim – Boehringer Ingelheim Ltd
- Boots – Boots Group (Medical Services)
- BPL – Bio Products Laboratory
- Braun – B. Braun Melsungen (Medical) Ltd
- Bristol-Myers Squibb – Bristol-Myers Squibb Pharmaceuticals Ltd
- Celltech – UCB Pharma Ltd
- Cephalon – Cephalon UK Ltd
- Chemidex – Chemidex Pharma Ltd
- Chugai – Chugai Pharmaceutical Co. UK Ltd
- Colgate-Palmolive – Colgate-Palmolive Ltd
- Coloplast – Coloplast Ltd
- Convatec – Convatec Ltd
- Cow & Gate – Nutricia Clinical Care Ltd
- CP – Wockhardt UK Ltd
- Crookes – Crookes Healthcare Ltd
- Dentsply – Dentsply Ltd
- Dista – Dista Products Ltd, division of Eli Lilly and Company
- DuPont – DuPont Pharmaceuticals Company, division sold to Bristol-Myers Squibb Pharmaceuticals Ltd
- Eisai – Eisai Ltd
- Essential Nutrition Ltd - Essential Nutrition Ltd
- Ethicon – Ethicon Inc.
- Fabre – Laboratoires Pierre Fabre Ltd
- Ferring – Ferring Pharmaceuticals (UK)
- Florizel – Florizel Ltd
- Fresenius SE – Fresenius SE Ltd
- Galderma – Galderma Laboratories (UK) Ltd
- Galpharm Healthcare - Galpharm International Ltd
- Garnier – Laboratoires Garnierdivision of Nestlé
- GE Healthcare – GE Healthcare
- Gilead – Gilead Sciences
- GlaxoSmithKline – GlaxoSmithKline
- Grünenthal – Grünenthal Ltd
- Grifols – Grifols UK Ltd
- GSK – GlaxoSmithKline
- GSK Consumer Healthcare – GlaxoSmithKline Consumer Healthcare
- Heinz – H. J. Heinz Company Ltd
- Hillcross – AAH Pharmaceuticals Ltd
- Hoechst Marion Roussel – Sanofi-Aventis Ltd
- Invicta – Pfizer Ltd
- Ipsen – Ipsen Ltd
- ITH Pharma Ltd
- IVAX – Ivax Corporation UK Ltd
- J&J – Johnson & Johnson Ltd
- J&J Medical – Johnson & Johnson Medical
- J&J MSD – (Johnson & Johnson MSD) McNeil Laboratories Ltd
- Janssen-Cilag – Janssen-Cilag Ltd
- King – King Pharmaceuticals Ltd
- Kyowa Hakko – Kyowa Hakko UK Ltd
- Lederie – Wyeth
- LEO – LEO Pharma
- LifeScan – LifeScan
- Lilly – Eli Lilly and Company Ltd
- Lundbeck – Lundbeck Ltd
- Martindale Pharma – Martindale Pharmaceuticals - Ltd (Now Ethypharm UK)
- Mölnlycke – Mölnlycke Health Care Ltd
- Mayne – Mayne Pharma plc
- McNeil – McNeil Laboratories Ltd
- Meda – Meda Pharmaceuticals Ltd
- Medac – Medac (UK), Scion House, University of Stirling
- MediSense – MediSense, Abbott Laboratories Ltd
- Menarini – A. Menarini Pharma UK SRL
- Menarini Diagnostics – A. Menarini Diagnostics
- Merck – Merck Pharmaceuticals
- Merck Consumer Health – Seven Seas Ltd
- Merck & Co. – Merck Sharp & Dohme Ltd
- Milupa – Milupa Ltd
- MSD – Merck & Co. Ltd
- Nestlé – Nestlé UK Ltd
- Nestlé Clinical – Nestlé Clinical Nutrition
- Neutrogena – Johnson & Johnson Ltd
- Novartis – Novartis Pharmaceuticals UK Ltd
- Novartis Consumer Health – Novartis Consumer Healththcare
- Novo Nordisk – Novo Nordisk Ltd
- Nycomed – Nycomed UK Ltd
- Octapharma – Octapharma Ltd
- Oral B Labs – Oral B Laboratories Ltd
- Orion – Orion Corporation (UK) Ltd
- Otsuka – Otsuka Pharmaceutical Co. (UK) Ltd
- Parke-Davis – Pfizer Ltd
- Pfizer – Pfizer Ltd
- Pharmacia – Pfizer Ltd

Pharmaron Biologics - was Allergan Biologics

- Procter & Gamble – Procter & Gamble Ltd
- Procter & Gamble Pharm. – Procter & Gamble Technical Centres, Medical Dept
- Reckitt Benckiser – Reckitt Benckiser Healthcare
- Rhône-Poulenc - Sanofi-Aventis Ltd
- Roche – Roche Products Ltd
- Roche Consumer Health – Bayer plc
- Roche Diagnostics – Roche Diagnostics Ltd
- Rosemont – Rosemont Pharmaceuticals Ltd
- Rybar – Shire plc Ltd
- Salts - Salts Healthcare Ltd
- Sandoz – Sandoz Ltd
- Sankyo – Sankyo Pharma UK Ltd
- Sanofi-Aventis – Sanofi-Aventis Ltd
- Sanofi Pasteur – Sanofi Pasteur MSD Ltd
- Sanofi-Synthélabo – Sanofi-Aventis Ltd
- Schering-Plough – Schering-Plough Ltd
- Schwarz – Schwarz Pharma Ltd
- Searle – Pfizer Ltd

Seqirus - was Novartis Vaccines

- Serono – Serono Pharmaceuticals Ltd
- Servier – Servier Laboratories Ltd
- Shire – Shire plc Ltd
- SHS – SHS International Ltd
- Sigma – Sigma Pharmaceuticals plc
- SMA Nutrition – Wyeth
- SNBTS – Scottish National Blood Transfusion Service, Protein Fractionation Centre
- Solvay – Solvay Healthcare Ltd
- Stablepharma – Stablepharma Ltd
- Squibb – Bristol-Myers Squibb Pharmaceuticals Ltd
- SSL – Medlock Medical Ltd
- Stiefel – Stiefel Laboratories (UK) Ltd
- Takeda – Takeda UK Ltd
- Taro – Taro Pharmaceuticals (UK) Ltd
- Teva – Teva Pharmaceuticals Ltd
- Thornton & Ross – Thornton & Ross Ltd
- Trinity-Chiesi – Trinity-Chiesi Pharmaceuticals Ltd
- Tyco – Covidien
- Univar – Univar Ltd
- Valeant – Valeant Pharmaceuticals Ltd
- Viatris – Viatris Pharmaceuticals Ltd
- W-L – Warner Lambert UK Ltd (Pfizer Ltd)
- Warner Lambert – Warner Lambert UK Ltd (Pfizer Ltd)
- Wockhardt – Wockhardt UK Ltd
- Wyeth – Wyeth Pharmaceuticals
- Yamanouchi – Yamanouchi Pharma Ltd

== See also ==
- Pharmaceutical industry in the United Kingdom
- List of pharmaceutical companies
- List of pharmacy organizations in the United Kingdom
- List of pharmacy associations
- List of pharmacies
- British Approved Name (BAN)
- International Nonproprietary Name (INN)
