= Essen III =

Federal electoral district of Germany

119 Essen III
- Electoral district for the Bundestag
- Essen III in 2025
- State: North Rhine-Westphalia
- Population: 253,600 (2019)
- Electorate: 190,335 (2021)
- Major settlements: Essen (partial)
- Area: 118.1 km^{2}

Current electoral district
- Created: 1949
- Party: CDU
- Member: Matthias Hauer
- Elected: 2013, 2017, 2021, 2025

Essen III is an electoral constituency (German: Wahlkreis) represented in the Bundestag. It elects one member via first-past-the-post voting. Under the current constituency numbering system, it is designated as constituency 119. It is located in the Ruhr region of North Rhine-Westphalia, comprising the southern part of the city of Essen.

Essen III was created for the inaugural 1949 federal election. Since 2013, it has been represented by Matthias Hauer of the Christian Democratic Union (CDU).

== Geography ==
Essen III is located in the Ruhr region of North Rhine-Westphalia. As of the 2021 federal election, it comprises the Stadtbezirke II (Rüttenscheid/Bergerhausen), III (Essen-West), VIII (Essen-Ruhrhalbinsel), and IX (Werden/Kettwig/Bredeney) from the independent city of Essen.

== History ==
Essen III was created in 1949. In the 1949 election, it was North Rhine-Westphalia constituency 32 in the numbering system. From 1953 through 1961, it was number 91. From 1965 through 1976, it was number 89. From 1980 through 1998, it was number 90. From 2002 through 2009, it was number 121. In the 2013 through 2021 elections, it was number 120. From the 2025 election, it has been number 119.

Originally, the constituency comprised the southern parts of the city of Essen. From 1980 through 1998, it comprised Stadtbezirke I (Stadtmitte/Frillendorf), II (Rüttenscheid/Bergerhausen), VIII (Essen-Ruhrhalbinsel), and IX (Werden/Kettwig/Bredeney). It acquired its current borders in the 2002 election.

Election	No.	Name	Borders
1949	32	Essen III	Essen city (only southern parts)
1953	91	Essen III	Essen city (only southern parts)
1957	91	Essen III	Essen city (only southern parts)
1961	91	Essen III	Essen city (only southern parts)
1965	89	Essen III	Essen city (only southern parts)
1969	89	Essen III	Essen city (only southern parts)
1972	89	Essen III	Essen city (only southern parts)
1976	89	Essen III	Essen city (only southern parts)
1980	90	Essen III	Essen city (only I (Stadtmitte/Frillendorf), II (Rüttenscheid/Bergerhausen), VIII (Essen-Ruhrhalbinsel), and IX (Werden/Kettwig/Bredeney) Stadtbezirke)
1983	90	Essen III	Essen city (only I (Stadtmitte/Frillendorf), II (Rüttenscheid/Bergerhausen), VIII (Essen-Ruhrhalbinsel), and IX (Werden/Kettwig/Bredeney) Stadtbezirke)
1987	90	Essen III	Essen city (only I (Stadtmitte/Frillendorf), II (Rüttenscheid/Bergerhausen), VIII (Essen-Ruhrhalbinsel), and IX (Werden/Kettwig/Bredeney) Stadtbezirke)
1990	90	Essen III	Essen city (only I (Stadtmitte/Frillendorf), II (Rüttenscheid/Bergerhausen), VIII (Essen-Ruhrhalbinsel), and IX (Werden/Kettwig/Bredeney) Stadtbezirke)
1994	90	Essen III	Essen city (only I (Stadtmitte/Frillendorf), II (Rüttenscheid/Bergerhausen), VIII (Essen-Ruhrhalbinsel), and IX (Werden/Kettwig/Bredeney) Stadtbezirke)
1998	90	Essen III	Essen city (only I (Stadtmitte/Frillendorf), II (Rüttenscheid/Bergerhausen), VIII (Essen-Ruhrhalbinsel), and IX (Werden/Kettwig/Bredeney) Stadtbezirke)
2002	121	Essen III	Essen city (only II (Rüttenscheid/Bergerhausen), III (Essen-West), VIII (Essen-Ruhrhalbinsel), and IX (Werden/Kettwig/Bredeney) Stadtbezirke)
2005	121	Essen III	Essen city (only II (Rüttenscheid/Bergerhausen), III (Essen-West), VIII (Essen-Ruhrhalbinsel), and IX (Werden/Kettwig/Bredeney) Stadtbezirke)
2009	121	Essen III	Essen city (only II (Rüttenscheid/Bergerhausen), III (Essen-West), VIII (Essen-Ruhrhalbinsel), and IX (Werden/Kettwig/Bredeney) Stadtbezirke)
2013	120	Essen III	Essen city (only II (Rüttenscheid/Bergerhausen), III (Essen-West), VIII (Essen-Ruhrhalbinsel), and IX (Werden/Kettwig/Bredeney) Stadtbezirke)
2017	120	Essen III	Essen city (only II (Rüttenscheid/Bergerhausen), III (Essen-West), VIII (Essen-Ruhrhalbinsel), and IX (Werden/Kettwig/Bredeney) Stadtbezirke)
2021	120	Essen III	Essen city (only II (Rüttenscheid/Bergerhausen), III (Essen-West), VIII (Essen-Ruhrhalbinsel), and IX (Werden/Kettwig/Bredeney) Stadtbezirke)
2025	119	Essen III	Essen city (only II (Rüttenscheid/Bergerhausen), III (Essen-West), VIII (Essen-Ruhrhalbinsel), and IX (Werden/Kettwig/Bredeney) Stadtbezirke)

== Members ==
The constituency was first represented by Jakob Kaiser of the Christian Democratic Union (CDU) from 1949 to 1957, followed by party fellow Hans Toussaint from 1957 to 1969. Antje Huber of the Social Democratic Party (SPD) was elected in 1969, and served until the 1983 election, when Paul Hoffacker of the CDU held it for a single term. Ingrid Becker-Inglau regained it for the SPD in 1987, serving until 2002. Hans-Günter Bruckmann then served a single term from 2002 to 2005, followed by fellow SPD member Petra Hinz from 2005 to 2013. Matthias Hauer of the CDU was elected representative in 2013, and re-elected in 2017, 2021, and 2025.

Election	Member	Party	%
1949	Jakob Kaiser	CDU	32.4
1953	Jakob Kaiser	CDU	53.5
1957	Hans Toussaint	CDU	56.3
1961	Hans Toussaint	CDU	48.7
1965	Hans Toussaint	CDU	48.6
1969	Antje Huber	SPD	49.8
1972	Antje Huber	SPD	53.1
1976	Antje Huber	SPD	47.7
1980	Antje Huber	SPD	49.1
1983	Paul Hoffacker	CDU	46.2
1987	Ingrid Becker-Inglau	SPD	44.9
1990	Ingrid Becker-Inglau	SPD	41.3
1994	Ingrid Becker-Inglau	SPD	44.9
1998	Ingrid Becker-Inglau	SPD	49.9
2002	Hans-Günter Bruckmann	SPD	49.8
2005	Petra Hinz	SPD	48.1
2009	Petra Hinz	SPD	38.6
2013	Matthias Hauer	CDU	39.6
2017	Matthias Hauer	CDU	37.1
2021	Matthias Hauer	CDU	30.7
2025	Matthias Hauer	CDU	35.7

== Election results ==
=== 2025 election ===
Federal election (2025): Essen III
Notes:	Blue background denotes the winner of the electorate vote. Pink background denotes a candidate elected from their party list. Yellow background denotes an electorate win by a list member, or other incumbent. A ✓ or ✗ denotes status of any incumbent, win or lose respectively.						
Party	Candidate	Votes	%	±%	Party votes	%	±%
CDU	✓ Matthias Hauer	55,807	35.7	▲5.0	46,387	29.6	▲5.2
SPD	Albert Ritter	38,546	24.7	▼5.4	33,184	21.2	▼6.9
Greens	Stephan Neumann	24,617	15.8	▼3.2	25,317	16.1	▼4.1
AfD	Stefan Keuter	18,563	11.9	▲6.5	19,029	12.1	▲6.6
Left	Tobias Umbreit	11,667	7.5	▲4.2	14,179	9.0	▲5.0
BSW					5,416	3.5	
FDP	Rüdiger König	4,835	3.1	▼4.1	7,710	4.9	▼6.9
Tierschutzpartei					1,841	1.2	▼0.1
FW	Boris Vorholt	1,751	1.1	0.0	516	0.3	▼0.2
Volt					1,284	0.8	▲0.5
PARTEI				▼1.9	989	0.6	▼0.5
MLPD	Roland Meister	380	0.2	▲0.2	105	0.1	0.0
PdF					265	0.2	▲0.1
dieBasis				▼1.1	219	0.1	▼0.9
Team Todenhöfer					208	0.1	▼0.4
BD					125	0.1	
MERA25					60	0.0	
Values					59	0.0	
Pirates							▼0.3
Humanists							▼0.1
Gesundheitsforschung							▼0.1
ÖDP							▼0.1
Bündnis C							▼0.1
SGP						0.0	0.0
Informal votes		1,400			673		
Total valid votes		156,166			156,893		
Turnout		157,566	84.5	▲4.2			
CDU hold	Majority	17,261	11.0				

=== 2021 election ===
Federal election (2021): Essen III
Notes:	Blue background denotes the winner of the electorate vote. Pink background denotes a candidate elected from their party list. Yellow background denotes an electorate win by a list member, or other incumbent. A ✓ or ✗ denotes status of any incumbent, win or lose respectively.						
Party	Candidate	Votes	%	±%	Party votes	%	±%
CDU	✓ Matthias Hauer	46,635	30.7	▼6.4	37,053	24.4	▼5.7
SPD	Gereon Wolters	45,612	30.0	▼0.8	42,629	28.0	▲3.3
Greens	Kai Gehring	28,745	18.9	▲10.7	30,764	20.2	▲10.8
FDP	Rüdiger König	10,871	7.2	▼1.2	17,995	11.8	▼3.3
AfD	Stefan Keuter	8,225	5.4	▼2.7	8,398	5.5	▼2.8
Left	Ezgi Güyildar	5,030	3.3	▼3.2	6,117	4.0	▼4.2
Tierschutzpartei					2,005	1.3	▲0.4
PARTEI	Martin O. Lange	2,931	1.9		1,718	1.1	0.0
dieBasis	Volker Wild	1,695	1.1		1,521	1.0	
Team Todenhöfer					852	0.6	
FW	Kai Hemsteeg	1,685	1.1		845	0.6	▲0.4
Volt					504	0.3	
Pirates					443	0.3	▼0.1
LIEBE					151	0.1	
Humanists					137	0.1	0.0
Gesundheitsforschung					129	0.1	0.0
V-Partei3					116	0.1	▼0.1
LfK					99	0.1	
NPD					90	0.1	▼0.1
ÖDP					89	0.1	▼0.1
DKP	Diana Kummer	172	0.1	0.0	90	0.1	0.0
Bündnis C					78	0.1	
MLPD	Dirk Willing	109	0.1	▼0.1	64	0.0	0.0
du.					61	0.0	
LKR	Dirk Schmidt	137	0.1		60	0.0	
PdF					40	0.0	
SGP					15	0.0	0.0
Informal votes		1,013			797		
Total valid votes		151,847			152,063		
Turnout		152,860	80.3	▲0.8			
CDU hold	Majority	1,023	0.7	▼5.6			

=== 2017 election ===
Federal election (2017): Essen III
Notes:	Blue background denotes the winner of the electorate vote. Pink background denotes a candidate elected from their party list. Yellow background denotes an electorate win by a list member, or other incumbent. A ✓ or ✗ denotes status of any incumbent, win or lose respectively.						
Party	Candidate	Votes	%	±%	Party votes	%	±%
CDU	✓ Matthias Hauer	56,393	37.1	▼2.5	45,826	30.1	▼6.2
SPD	Gereon Wolters	46,829	30.8	▼8.7	37,699	24.7	▼8.4
FDP	Tim Wortmann	12,639	8.3	▲6.3	23,068	15.1	▲9.4
Greens	Kai Gehring	12,511	8.2	▲0.5	14,312	9.4	▼0.3
AfD	Stefan Keuter	12,306	8.1	▲5.4	12,735	8.4	▲4.5
Left	Ayten Kaplan	9,846	6.5	▲1.6	12,574	8.3	▲1.7
PARTEI					1,791	1.2	▲0.7
Tierschutzpartei					1,356	0.9	
Independent	Serge Menga Nsibu	1,175	0.8				
Pirates					554	0.4	▼1.7
AD-DEMOKRATEN					364	0.2	
FW					292	0.2	0.0
NPD					259	0.2	▼0.7
V-Partei³					251	0.2	
DiB					249	0.2	
BGE					173	0.1	
ÖDP					173	0.1	0.0
Volksabstimmung					151	0.1	0.0
Gesundheitsforschung					134	0.1	
MLPD	Martina Stalleicken	208	0.1		134	0.1	0.0
DM					115	0.1	
Die Humanisten					97	0.1	
DKP	Diana Kummer	197	0.1		89	0.1	
SGP					13	0.0	0.0
Informal votes		1,232			927		
Total valid votes		152,104			152,409		
Turnout		153,336	79.5	▲2.3			
CDU hold	Majority	9,564	6.3	▲6.2			

=== 2013 election ===
Federal election (2013): Essen III
Notes:	Blue background denotes the winner of the electorate vote. Pink background denotes a candidate elected from their party list. Yellow background denotes an electorate win by a list member, or other incumbent. A ✓ or ✗ denotes status of any incumbent, win or lose respectively.						
Party	Candidate	Votes	%	±%	Party votes	%	±%
CDU	Matthias Hauer	59,101	39.5	▲3.5	54,310	36.3	▲6.2
SPD	✗ Petra Hinz	59,008	39.5	▲0.8	49,626	33.1	▲2.1
Greens	Kai Gehring	11,576	7.7	▼1.7	14,550	9.7	▼2.3
Left	Cornelia Swillus-Knöchel	7,341	4.9	▼2.0	9,855	6.6	▼1.7
AfD	Martin Erwin Renner	4,015	2.7		5,812	3.9	
Pirates	Frank Höschen	3,169	2.1		3,087	2.1	▲0.5
FDP	Petra Hermann	3,007	2.0	▼5.5	8,581	5.7	▼8.3
NPD	Manuel Mikolajtzyk	1,489	1.0	▼0.1	1,294	0.9	0.0
PARTEI					757	0.5	
Independent	Gramm	570	0.4				
PRO					326	0.2	
FW					236	0.2	
REP					215	0.1	▼0.3
Nichtwahler					205	0.1	
Volksabstimmung					190	0.1	0.0
ÖDP					186	0.1	▲0.1
BIG					140	0.1	
MLPD					100	0.1	0.0
Party of Reason					98	0.1	
BüSo	Katarzyna Kruczkowski	213	0.1	▼0.2	91	0.1	0.0
RRP					60	0.0	▼0.1
PSG					32	0.0	0.0
Die Rechte					21	0.0	
Informal votes		1,551			1,268		
Total valid votes		149,489			149,772		
Turnout		151,040	77.2	▲1.7			
CDU gain from SPD	Majority	93	0.1				

=== 2009 election ===
Federal election (2009): Essen III
Notes:	Blue background denotes the winner of the electorate vote. Pink background denotes a candidate elected from their party list. Yellow background denotes an electorate win by a list member, or other incumbent. A ✓ or ✗ denotes status of any incumbent, win or lose respectively.						
Party	Candidate	Votes	%	±%	Party votes	%	±%
SPD	✓ Petra Hinz	57,055	38.6	▼9.4	45,888	31.0	▼11.0
CDU	Matthias Hauer	53,269	36.1	▼1.4	44,455	30.0	▼0.9
Greens	Kai Gehring	13,969	9.5	▲3.9	17,807	12.0	▲2.3
FDP	Petra Hermann	11,035	7.5	▲4.2	20,829	14.1	▲4.7
Left	Cornelia Swillus-Knöchel	10,240	6.9	▲2.4	12,239	8.3	▲2.7
Pirates					2,341	1.6	
NPD	Hermann August Schnarre	1,614	1.1	▲0.3	1,227	0.8	▲0.3
Tierschutzpartei					915	0.6	▲0.1
REP					598	0.4	▲0.1
FAMILIE					525	0.4	▲0.1
RENTNER					404	0.3	
RRP					173	0.1	
BüSo	Matthias Kraume	508	0.3		148	0.1	▲0.1
Volksabstimmung					142	0.1	0.0
ÖDP					109	0.1	
MLPD					91	0.1	0.0
Centre					78	0.1	0.0
DVU					75	0.1	
PSG					39	0.0	0.0
Informal votes		1,591			1,198		
Total valid votes		147,690			148,083		
Turnout		149,281	75.5	▼6.1			
SPD hold	Majority	3,786	2.5	▼8.0			

=== 2005 election ===
Federal election (2005): Essen III
Notes:	Blue background denotes the winner of the electorate vote. Pink background denotes a candidate elected from their party list. Yellow background denotes an electorate win by a list member, or other incumbent. A ✓ or ✗ denotes status of any incumbent, win or lose respectively.						
Party	Candidate	Votes	%	±%	Party votes	%	±%
SPD	Petra Hinz	77,708	48.1	▼1.7	67,967	42.0	▼2.1
CDU	Henning Aretz	60,530	37.4	▲2.3	50,018	30.9	0.0
Greens	Kai Gehring	8,987	5.6	▼1.7	15,714	9.7	▼2.3
Left	Wolfgang Freye	7,373	4.6	▲3.3	9,089	5.6	▲4.1
FDP	Hans-Peter Schöneweiß	5,365	3.3	▼2.5	15,235	9.4	▲0.1
NPD	Kurt Dotz	1,209	0.7		916	0.6	▲0.4
Tierschutzpartei					826	0.5	
GRAUEN					612	0.4	▲0.2
REP					472	0.3	0.0
Familie					471	0.3	▲0.1
PARTEI	Stefan Romberg	460	0.3				
PBC					145	0.1	
From Now on... Democracy Through Referendum					142	0.1	
MLPD					122	0.1	
Centre					85	0.1	
Socialist Equality Party					54	0.0	
BüSo					53	0.0	0.0
Informal votes		1,923			1,634		
Total valid votes		161,632			161,921		
Turnout		163,555	81.6	▼0.2			
SPD hold	Majority	17,178	10.7				
