= Melissa Hanna-Brown =

British pharmacologist

- Education: King's College London; University of Sunderland
- Scientific career
- Workplaces: Pfizer UK; King's College London; University of Warwick
- Website: kclpure.kcl.ac.uk/portal/en/persons/melissa-hannabrown(b87450be-e29d-428d-b845-e68280cb4bdb).html

Melissa Hanna-Brown is a British pharmacologist. She works for Pfizer UK and is a visiting professor at the University of Warwick.

== Early life and education ==
Hannah-Brown became interested in pharmacy as a child, when she worked at her local chemists on the weekend. She studied Pharmaceutical Science at the University of Sunderland, spending a year at GlaxoSmithKline and graduating in 1995. She completed a Biotechnology and Biological Sciences Research Council (BBSRC) SmithKline Beecham sponsored PhD in pharmaceutical analysis at King's College London in 1998.

== Research and career ==
Hannah-Brown remained at King's College London as an Engineering and Physical Sciences Research Council (EPSRC) funded postdoctoral researcher. She became a lecturer in the Department of Pharmacy in 2000. She won the Desty Memorial Prize for Contribution to Separation Science in 2000. She developed instrumentation to enable detection of trace components in biofluids supported by Research Councils UK.

In 2006, Hanna-Brown was appointed as Separation Science Lead at Pfizer UK, and made head of the Analytical Team in 2008. She was made visiting full professor at the University of Warwick in 2011. In 2014 she was appointed Technology & Innovation Lead for the Pfizer Worldwide R&D division. She works on drug analytical science to support the development of drugs to applications. Her work looks at analytical quality. She also looks at using Quality by Design to develop chromatographic methods.

She was the President of the Royal Society of Chemistry (RSC) analytical division council in 2017 and is Vice Chair of the separation science group. Hanna-Brown contributes to diversity and inclusion initiatives at Pfizer, writing their gender pay gap report.

=== Awards and honours ===
Hanna-Brown was included in the Top 30 Women Leaders in the UK in 2018.
