= Nutricia North America =

- Headquarters: United States North America

Nutricia is a specialized medical nutrition company. It is part of the Medical Nutrition Division of Groupe Danone, Paris. Nutricia manufactures products used in the management of severe allergic and gastrointestinal disorders, metabolic conditions as well as other conditions requiring nutritional therapy, including intractable epilepsy.

Among other products, Nutricia manufactures Neocate, an amino acid-based, hypoallergenic formula for the dietary management of milk protein allergy available in North America. Despite evidence that Neocate can lead to a "hungry bone syndrome," calcium and phosphorus issues, and pathologic fractures when it is the sole source of an infant or child's nutrition, the company has repeatedly blown off those who suggest that they investigate and address this issue. The company also manufactures Lorenzo's oil, an alternative medicine for a rare neurological disease called adrenoleukodystrophy (ALD) that was featured in the 1992 movie Lorenzo's Oil. Nutricia provides Lorenzo's oil to patients at cost.

== History ==
Nutricia North America, Inc. (formerly known as SHS North America) was established in 1983. From 1983 until 1997, the company was a subsidiary of Royal Numico N.V. In 2007, Royal Numico was purchased by Groupe Danone, Paris. Nutricia North America is headquartered in Rockville, MD.

== See also ==
- Milk allergy
- Phenylketonuria
- Ketogenic diet
- SHS International
