= Business process validation =

Verifying business processes function as intended

Business Process Validation (BPV) is the act of verifying that a set of end-to-end business processes function as intended. If there are problems in one or more business applications that support a business process, or in the integration or configuration of those systems, then the consequences of disruption to the business can be serious. A company might be unable to take orders or ship product – which can directly impact company revenue, reputation, and customer satisfaction. It can also drive additional expenses, as defects in production are much more expensive to fix than if identified earlier. For this reason, a key aim of Business Process Validation is to identify defects early, before new enterprise software is deployed in production so that there is no business impact and the cost of repairing defects is kept to a minimum.

During Business Process Validation (BPV), the business process is checked step-by-step using representative data to confirm that all business rules are working correctly and that all underlying transactions are performing properly across every enterprise application used in the business process. When defects are identified, these problems are logged for repair by IT personnel, business analysts or the software vendor, as appropriate.

Business Process Validation can be performed on various timescales, including the following:

- Project basis, when new enterprise software systems (such as mobile, cloud, or web applications) are being deployed for the first time
- Periodic basis, when there are regular monthly, quarterly, or annual updates to enterprise software
- Continuous basis, when companies want to validate the readiness of their processes and enterprise systems 24/7/365

== Business Process Validation Methods ==
=== Manual ===
Manual Business Process Validation is where one or more people (typically a cross-functional team) work at keyboards or mobile devices to execute the various business process steps directly in the enterprise software by hand. Defects are manually noted and typically logged in a defect tracking system.

There are several shortcomings to the manual approach. First, since all data is entered by hand, it can be time consuming for subject matter experts and business analysts. These are expensive staff resources that could be deployed on other higher value activities. Second, manual testing extends project timelines. This slows the deployment of innovation and makes business users wait longer for cost saving and revenue generating new technology. Third, the manual process is often incomplete, since the time-intensive nature means that IT teams cannot test all business processes, given their resource constraints. This lack of coverage introduces technology risk in a company’s business processes. Finally, if business process validation is done manually by IT teams, then business requirements and processes have to be unambiguously documented in advance, which is a time-consuming task.

=== Automated ===
Automated Business Process Validation relies on software to execute the various business process steps directly in the enterprise software systems in an automated fashion. BPV software automatically uses standard business process data during the validation, and interprets the correctness of each transaction and result. Defects are automatically noted and logged.

Automated business process validation is a way to ensure that a company’s business processes continue to work, even when mission critical enterprise systems change.

== See also ==
- Process validation
- Business process preservation
