= Process qualification =

Process qualification is the qualification of manufacturing and production processes to confirm they are able to operate at a certain standard during sustained commercial manufacturing. Data covering critical process parameters must be recorded and analyzed to ensure critical quality attributes can be guaranteed throughout production. This may include testing equipment at maximum operating capacity to show quantity demands can be met. Once all processes have been qualified the manufacturer should have a complete understanding of the process design and have a framework in place to routinely monitor operations. Only after process qualification has been completed can the manufacturing process begin production for commercial use. Equally important as qualifying processes and equipment is qualifying software and personnel. A well trained staff and accurate, thorough records helps ensure ongoing protection from process faults and quick recovery from otherwise costly process malfunctions. In many countries qualification measures are also required, especially in the pharmaceutical manufacturing field.

Process qualification should cover the following aspects of manufacturing:

- Facility
- Utilities
- Equipment
- Personnel
- End-to-end manufacturing
- Control protocols and monitoring software.

Process qualification is the second stage of process validation.

A vital component of process qualification is process performance qualification protocol. PPQ protocol is essential in defining and maintaining production standards within an organization.

== See also ==
- Installation qualification
- Design qualification
- Performance qualification
- Process validation
