= Process performance qualification protocol =

Process performance qualification protocol is a component of process validation: process qualification. This step is vital in maintaining ongoing production quality by recording and having available for review essential conditions, controls, testing, and expected manufacturing outcome of a production process. The Food and Drug Administration recommends the following criteria be included in a PPQ protocol:

- Manufacturing conditions: Operating parameters, equipment limits, and component inputs
- What data should be recorded and analyzed
- What tests should be performed to ensure quality at each production step
- A sampling plan to outline sampling methods both during and between production batches
- Analysis methodology that allows for data scientific and risk oriented decision making based on statistical data. Variability limits should be defined and contingencies in the event of non-conforming data established
- Approval of PPQ protocol from relevant departments

Deviations from the standard operation procedures should be made within the framework of the protocol and at the approval of relevant quality control departments. The FDA further recommends a documentation of the protocol be published internally. The report should include:

- A summation of relevant data and analysis from the protocol
- An explanation of unexpected data and any other results not mandated by the protocol and its effects on production quality
- Identify correlating effects and suggest changes to existing processes
- Conclude if the process performance is adequately qualified to meet performance standards. Should production standards not be met appropriate changes should be outlined
