= Pfizer UK =

Subsidiary of Pfizer

Pfizer Ltd
- Company type: Subsidiary
- Industry: Pharmaceutical
- Founded: 1952
- Headquarters: Tadworth, Surrey, United Kingdom
- Products: Pharmaceuticals
- Number of employees: 2,500
- Parent: Pfizer
- Website: www.pfizer.co.uk

Pfizer UK (officially Pfizer Ltd) is the principal subsidiary of the multinational pharmaceutical company Pfizer in the United Kingdom.

Pfizer UK has its business headquarters in Tadworth, Surrey, major offices in Maidenhead, Berkshire, research and development facilities in Cambridge, Cambridgeshire and Sandwich, Kent, and a manufacturing and distribution site in Havant, Hampshire.

== History ==
=== 1952–2000 ===
To satisfy regulations then in place in the United Kingdom on the importation of medicines, Pfizer established a compounding operation in Folkestone, Kent, in the autumn of 1952. Pfizer acquired an 80-acre site on the outskirts of Sandwich in 1954 to enable the expansion of its Kent-based activities. In 1955, Pfizer established an animal-feed plant at the Sandwich site and entered the UK non-prescription market for the first time. An Agricultural Division was opened at the Sandwich site in 1957, and in 1964, Pfizer acquired land adjacent to its existing site in Sandwich, known as the 'West Site'. Pfizer UK established 'Pfizer Central Research' in 1971 with the mission to discover new pharmaceutical, chemical and agricultural products for Pfizer's worldwide operations.

Pfizer UK was presented with the Queen's Award for Technological Achievement in 1979, in recognition of the outstanding contribution made to tropical medicine by the medicine Mansil (oxamniquine), which had been developed at the Sandwich site. Feldene (piroxicam), a non-steroidal anti-inflammatory drug developed jointly by the Sandwich site and Pfizer's R&D facility in Groton, United States, was launched in 1980. In 1984, a third phase of buildings was completed at the Sandwich site. The oral antifungal drug Diflucan (fluconazole), which had been discovered at the Sandwich site, was launched in 1988. In December 1997, Pfizer announced an investment of £109 million in a new research facility at the Sandwich site, creating 1,000 jobs.

=== 2000–2010 ===
In April 2001, Pfizer UK received the Queen's Award for Enterprise for the discovery and development of the erectile dysfunction drug Viagra (sildenafil). In 2002, Pfizer UK relocated its headquarters and sales and marketing functions to new offices at Walton Oaks, near Tadworth, Surrey. In June 2003, Pfizer UK began offering employees at the Sandwich site the option of leaving work at noon on Fridays if their work was completed. In September 2007, it was announced that Pfizer UK would close its manufacturing plant at Sandwich, with the loss of around 400 jobs. Dr Ken Richardson was inducted into the US National Inventors Hall of Fame in May 2008 for his role in the discovery of Diflucan whilst working at Pfizer UK. Construction of an £87 million link-road between the Sandwich site and the A299 was approved by HM Government in August 2009.

=== 2010–present ===
On 1 February 2011, Pfizer announced it would be closing the entire research and development facility at Sandwich within 18–24 months, as part of a company-wide plan to exit certain therapeutic areas including allergy and respiratory research, which was based at Sandwich. In its announcement, Pfizer stated that most of the 2,400 workers at the site would be made redundant, although it hoped to transfer several hundred positions to other sites or to Pfizer partner companies. On 4 February 2011, it was announced that the Science and Technology Select Committee would be requesting oral evidence from representatives of Pfizer and the Minister of State for Universities and Science, David Willetts, on the closure of the Sandwich site.

In April 2011, Pfizer established Neusentis in Cambridge, intended to operate as a biotech-like unit combining research in pain, sensory disorders, and regenerative medicine. Neusentis acquired biopharmaceutical company Icagen in November 2011.

In June 2011, Pfizer renamed the Sandwich site 'Discovery Park' and put it on the market for sale. In the same month, Pfizer announced it would retain 350 jobs at Discovery Park, subsequently increased to 650 in November 2011. In August 2011, it was announced that the Pfizer site at Sandwich would become an enterprise zone with discounted business rates, easier planning rules, and access to superfast broadband. Pfizer sold the freehold to the Discovery Park site to Discovery Park Ltd, a private consortium, in August 2012. As part of the sale, Pfizer agreed to take a lease of around 250,000 sq ft of offices and laboratories at the site.

In August 2016, Pfizer acquired a portfolio of anti-infective medicines from AstraZeneca.

In November 2023, Pfizer announced plans to eliminate 500 jobs at its Sandwich, Kent facility as part of a broader $3.5 billion cost-reduction strategy. This move follows the company's lowered annual revenue projections, affected by diminishing demand for its COVID-19 vaccine and treatment, which led to Pfizer's first quarterly loss since 2019.

== Operations ==
=== Discovery Park, Sandwich ===
Around 650 Pfizer employees are based at Discovery Park in Sandwich. Pfizer operations at Discovery Park are focused on the delivery of the company's mid- to late-stage portfolio. Activities at the site include Pharmaceutical Sciences; Medical Regulatory; Business Units; Quality Assurance; and Business Support Functions (Procurement & Operation, HR, Finance, Patents). There is also a pilot plant production and solid and liquid dose manufacturing facility at the site.

=== Neusentis, Cambridge ===
Neusentis was a biotech-like unit based in Cambridge which was focused on research in pain, sensory disorders, regenerative medicine, and auditory and visual disorders linked to ion channels. Neusentis was responsible for Pfizer's first stem cell clinical study, initiated in 2011 for patients with AMD. Pfizer announced in December 2015 that it had decided to close the Neusentis unit with the loss of around 120 jobs. However, the Devices Centre of Excellence (DCoE) remained in operation.

== Awards ==
In 1991, Pfizer UK was presented with the Queen's Award for Technological Achievement in recognition of its discovery of Diflucan. In 1993, Pfizer UK was awarded the Queen's Award for Export Achievement. In 1997 and 2000, Pfizer UK was awarded the Queen's Award for International Trade.

== See also ==
- List of pharmaceutical manufacturers in the United Kingdom
