= Crookes Healthcare =

British healthcare company

Crookes Healthcare Ltd
- Type: Subsidiary
- Industry: Healthcare and pharmaceuticals
- Predecessor: Crookes Laboratories Ltd
- Founded: 17 December 1918; 107 years ago
- Headquarters: D80 Building, Thane Road, Lenton, Nottingham, NG90 1LP
- Area served: Worldwide
- Products: Medical remedies
- Number of employees: c.600
- Parent: Reckitt

Crookes Healthcare is a healthcare manufacturer based in Nottingham, England, and a subsidiary of Reckitt. It manufactures some of the best-known health remedies and over-the-counter drugs sold by British pharmacies.

== History ==
The name comes from Sir William Crookes, a chemist. Crookes Collosols, started by Henry Crookes, the son of William Crookes, was formed on 29 March 1912. British Colloids Ltd, formed in December 1918, bought this company in January 1919.

In 1946, it became The Crookes Laboratories Ltd, on Gorst Road in north-west London. It became a public company on 28 February 1951. Crookes Laboratories was an international company. One of its best-selling products was the LactoCalamine skin-care range. This latter featured the Hollywood film star Audrey Hepburn in its adverts.

By the 1960s it was making dosulepin, a tricyclic antidepressant (TCA), under the brand name Prothiaden.

== Ownership ==
=== Guinness ===
In November 1960 it was bought by Arthur Guinness Son and Company in a joint-venture with Philips-Duphar (part of Philips Electrical Industries) of the Netherlands, who owned 40%.

John Laing built a new £1m headquarters, at Houndmills in north Hampshire, in October 1963, on 11 acres.

In April 1969 Guinness acquired the rest of Crookes Laboratories.

There were two main divisions

- Crookes Laboratories Group
- Crookes Anestan – toiletries

Both companies were profitable. Crookes Veterinary began in September 1969. Although veterinary products had formed part of the products range well before this date; E.g. Vivomin a food supplement for animals.

=== Boots ===
Boots of Nottingham agreed to buy the two divisions of the company on 26 July 1971 for around £2 million. At this point its turnover was around £700,000 a year.

The Crookes Veterinary Ltd division was sold to Anglian Food Group for £260,000. This company moved to central Birmingham and was wound up around 1997.

By the early 1980s Boots had amalgamated its most common household medical products into its Crookes Products division, which is much the form that the company retains today. In the 1980s its main competitor was the Beecham Group for OTC medicines, and with Warner-Lambert the three had about half of the market. In October 1987 it claimed to be Britain's leading manufacturer of OTC medicines.

In February 1983, Boots bought Optrex Ltd. (which had been bought by Hoechst AG in 1976) for around £10 million; Optrex had been based at 17 Wadsworth Road in Perivale from the 1930s. In October 1990, it bought Mycil from Medeva plc (who were bought by Celltech in November 1999).

Under Boots, the main money-spinner of the Crookes Products division was Nurofen (Ibuprofen or Brufen), which Boots had patented in 1962, developed by Stewart Adams (chemist) and launched on 8 August 1983. By the late 1980s, Nurofen had a 12% share of the analgesics market. Gold Greenlees Trott (GGT), who later bought BBDP then were bought by Omnicom Group in 1998 and made part of TBWA Worldwide, were commissioned to make an advert to markedly increase Nurofen's market share. Analgesics are mainly purchased by 25- to 40-year-old women. The 30-second TV advert, launched on 3 May 1989, used the voice instrumental section by Clare Torry (for which she was originally paid £150) of The Great Gig in the Sky. It was the first time that an analgesic brand had been advertised in such fashion, and the first time that music from Pink Floyd had been used in TV advertising; they only agreed after seeing the produced advert.

From 2000 to 2006 it also made Clearasil, the skin-care product.

=== Reckitt Benckiser ===
Reckitt Benckiser bought Boots Healthcare International (BHI) for £1.9 billion in 2005, which required regulatory approval in early 2006.

== Products ==
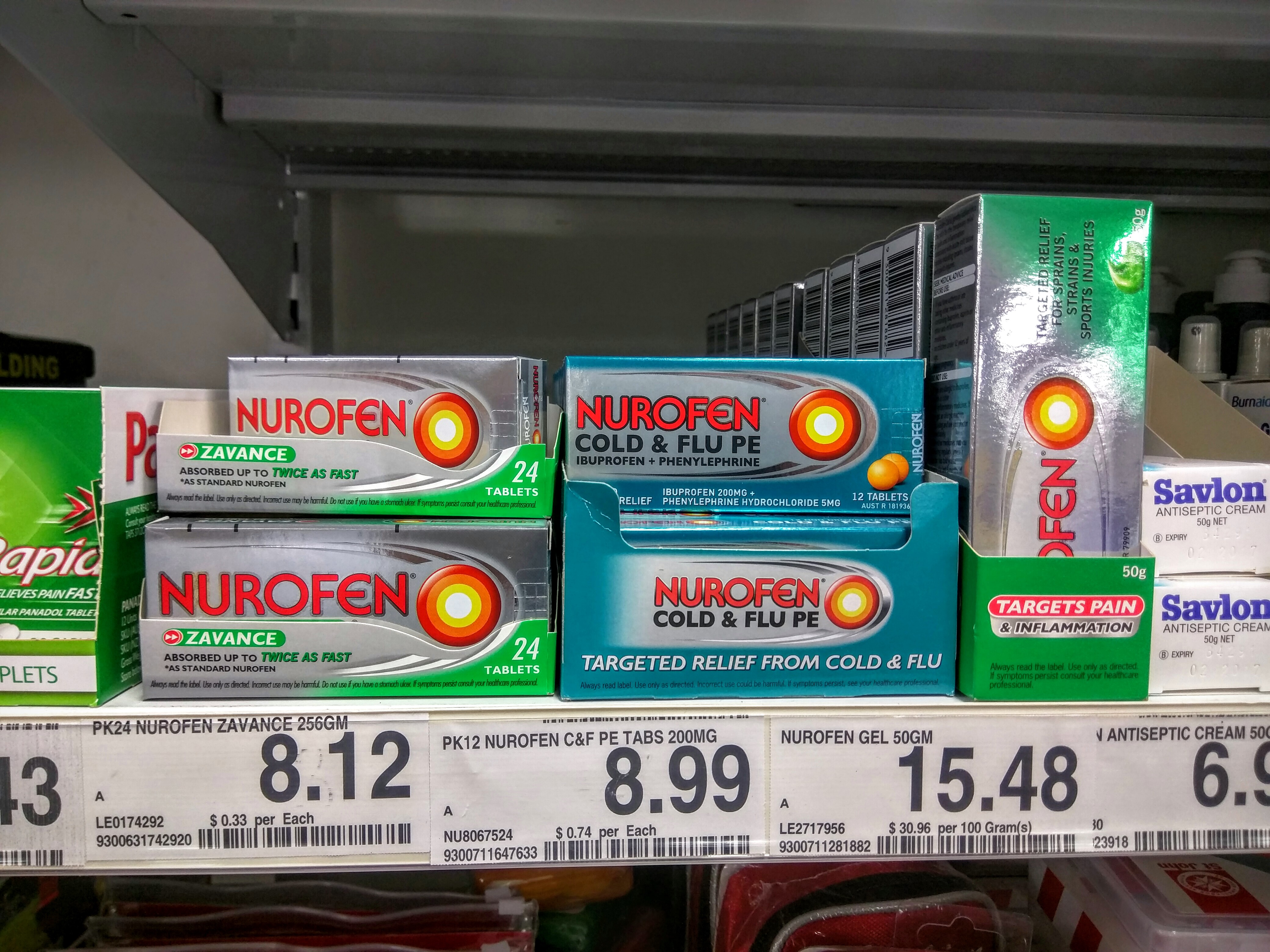
Nurofen (ibuprofen)

The household-name products it makes are:

- Nurofen
- Strepsils
- E45 skincare
- Optrex (chloramphenicol)
- Sweetex
- Mycil (chlorphenesin)
- Karvol
- Dequacaine (Menthol flavoured Throat lozenges containing anaesthetic)

In 2016 Nurofen was one of the biggest selling branded over-the-counter medications sold in Great Britain, with sales of £116.8 million. Optrex had sales of £39 million and Strepsils £34.4 million.

=== Discontinued products ===
The household-name products it no longer makes are:

- Mycil Cream
- Mycil Powder
- Karvol

== Alumni ==
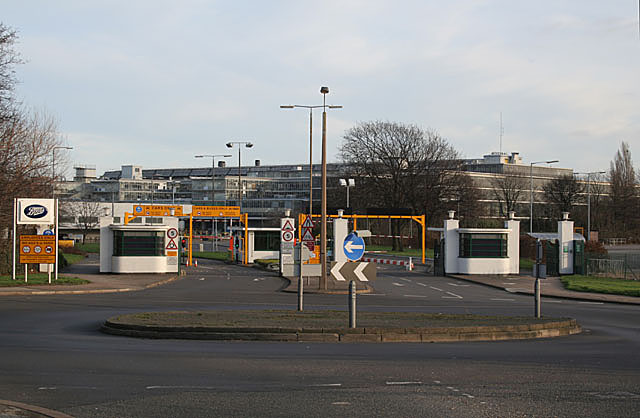
Boots entrance in Beeston

- Sir Michael Lyons, brand manager from 1971 to 1972 for Crookes-Anestan

== See also ==
- List of pharmaceutical manufacturers in the United Kingdom
