= Ingrid Becker-Inglau =

German politician (born 1946)

Member of the Bundestag for Essen III
- In office 1989–2002
- Preceded by: Paul Hoffacker
- Succeeded by: Hans-Günter Bruckmann

Personal details
- Born: 20 November 1946 (age 79) Essen, Germany
- Party: Social Democratic Party of Germany

Ingrid Becker-Inglau (née Neumann; born 20 November 1946) is a German former politician from the Social Democratic Party. She was a member of the German Bundestag from 1987 to 2002 and was always directly elected in the Essen III constituency.

== Biography ==
After graduating from high school in 1967, she began her studies at the Teacher Training College in Hagen, and in 1972 she became a teacher in Essen. In the same year, she joined the SPD (Social Democratic Party), for which she served on the Essen City Council from 1976 to 1987. In the German Bundestag, she most recently served on the Committee on Economic Cooperation and as a substitute member of the Health Committee.

== See also ==
- List of members of the 11th Bundestag
- List of members of the 12th Bundestag
- List of members of the 13th Bundestag
- List of members of the 14th Bundestag
