= Anikspray =

- Anikspray & Anik Ghee was launched in the year 1965 by Lipton from the facility in Etah (U.P).
- HLL acquired Lipton India in 1972 and added two more brands - Anik Madhur, Anik Milkana.
- In 1999 Dutch multinational Numico Ltd, through its subsidiary company Nutricia (India) Pvt Ltd acquired dairy business from HLL and launched Anik Anytime Dairy whitener.
- The company expanded distribution to 1000 distributors & 3.1 lac outlets
- In 2003, a Consortium of 4 companies headed by Mirage Impex acquired the business from Nutricia. MP Glychem earlier version of Anik industries was already operating Sourabh dairy in MP via Dewas facility.
- In 2016, Lactalis acquired a dairy business from Anik Industries & established Anik Milk Products Pvt Ltd.

== History ==
At its heyday, the brand Anikspray was originally developed and owned by Lipton India and Hindustan Unilever Limited. In 1999, Hindustan Unilever sold its dairy products business as well the brands Anik, Anikspray and Anik Ghee to Nutricia (India) Private Limited, which was owned by the Dutch consumer products giant Numico.

In 2003, Numico decided to cease its operations in India and sold Nutricia to a consortium of four companies headed by Mirage Impex. The deal involving Mirage Impex was steered by Ashok Phadnis, a dairy business veteran who was previously the managing director of the Madhya Pradesh Dairy Federation.

== Current Operations ==
Today, Anik Spray is manufactured by Anik Milk Products Private Limited, based in the city of Indore, Madhya Pradesh, India. Other than Anik Spray, the company also produces ghee that is sold under the brand name Anik Ghee.

== See also ==
- Amulspray
- Amul
