= Navin Engineer =

British businessman (born 1951)

- Born: Navinchandra Jamnadas Engineer; May 1951 (age 75)
- Known for: Founder and owner, Chemidex
- Spouse: Varsha Engineer
- Children: 2

Navinchandra Jamnadas Engineer (born May 1951) is a British billionaire, the owner of Chemidex, a pharmaceutical company that he founded in 1981.

== Early life ==
Navinchandra Jamnadas Engineer was born in May 1951. His father worked for the Kenyan civil service. In 1963, he was sent from Kenya to London to live with his aunt, and later studied at the London School of Pharmacy.

== Career ==
Engineer's first job on graduation was a pharmacist for the Boots the Chemist chain, which he found "a little bit like the civil service"; one day he was shocked by a visiting area manager asking for a cup of tea when he was busy dispensing prescriptions, and resigned the same day.

Chemidex was founded by Engineer and his wife in 1981, and is based in Egham, Surrey.

In 1981, Chemidex opened its first pharmacy in Chertsey, Surrey. In 1999, he had 14 pharmacies which he sold to the German company Celesio for a reported £12 million. Chemidex then became a pharmaceutical company, and it acquired its first brand in 2000.

According to The Sunday Times, the business is valued at £1 billion and Engineer at £1.1 billion.

Engineer also set up the company Essential Generics, a drug manufacturer based in Egham, Surrey. He resigned as a director of the company in 2013.

== Personal life ==
He is married to Varsha Engineer. They have two children, and both studied medicine.
