= Petra Hinz =

German politician

Petra Hinz MdB a.D.
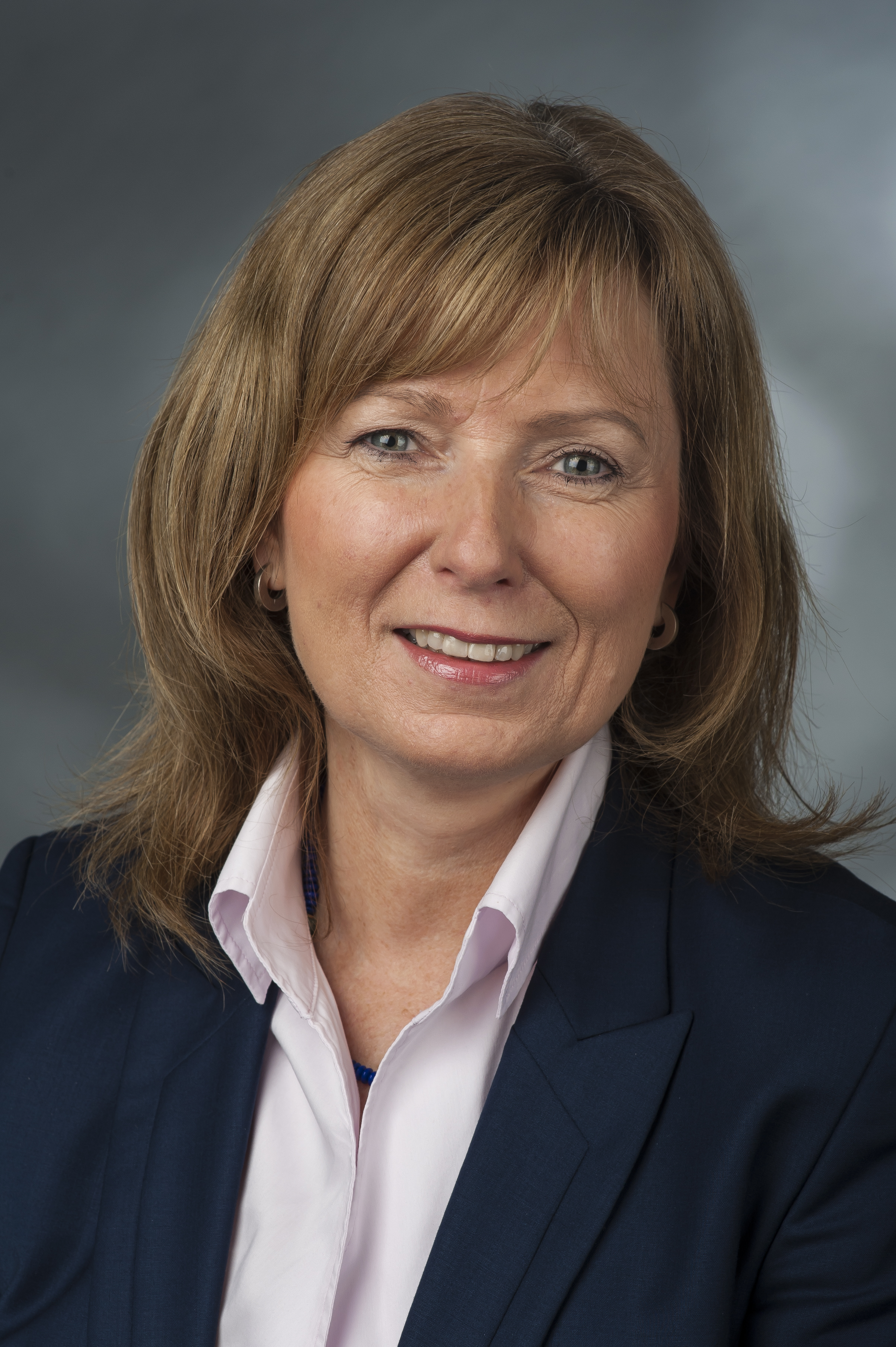
- Hinz in 2013

Member of the Bundestag for North Rhine-Westphalia
- In office 22 October 2013 – 31 August 2016
- Preceded by: multi-member district
- Succeeded by: Jürgen Coße
- Constituency: Social Democratic Party List
- In office 18 October 2005 – 22 October 2013
- Preceded by: Hans-Günter Bruckmann
- Succeeded by: Matthias Hauer
- Constituency: Essen III

Member of the Essen City Council for District III
- In office 1989–2005
- Preceded by: multi-member district
- Succeeded by: multi-member district

Personal details
- Born: 10 June 1962 (age 64) Essen, West Germany (now Germany)
- Party: Social Democratic Party (1980–2016)
- Occupation: Politician; Impostor

Petra Hinz (born 10 June 1962 in Essen) is a German politician and impostor. She is a member of the SPD. Since 2005, Hinz has been an MP of the German Bundestag. She resigned from her Bundestag seat after a CV scandal with effect of 1 September 2016.

== Biography ==
Hinz left school with a university of applied sciences entrance qualification in 1983, and afterwards completed a year of internship at a local bank (Sparkasse) and a vocational training as a presenter from 1985 to 1987. From 1999 to 2003 she worked as a real estate manager. Hinz has been a SPD member since 1980 and worked for the party since 1982 in different positions, such as vice district chairwoman. From 1989 to 2005 she was a member of the Essen city council.

== CV scandal ==
Hinz made headlines after allegations that she bullied her employees and faked essential parts of her curriculum vitae (CV), falsely claiming that she took her A-levels in 1984 and studied Law and Political Science for ten years from 1985 to 1995. Hinz admitted that she faked her CV. She resigned from her Bundestag mandate only after growing public pressure on 24 August 2016, but because of a formal error her request was considered as preliminary invalid by the Bundestag administration. On 30 August, it was reported that the resignation of her Bundestag seat with effect of 1 September 2016 was now formally accepted. Hinz also announced that she will resign from the SPD party until 5 September 2016, after the party had initiated internal proceedings against her. The case of Petra Hinz was viewed as a "disaster" for the SPD party.
