= Matthias Hauer =

German politician

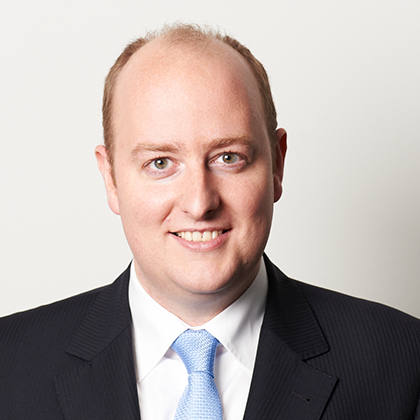
- Hauer in 2017

Member of the German Bundestag
- Incumbent
- Assumed office 2013
- Preceded by: Petra Hinz, SPD
- Constituency: Essen III

City Council member
- In office 2004–2013
- Constituency: Essen

Personal details
- Born: 18 December 1977 (age 48) Hattingen, West Germany (now Germany)
- Party: CDU
- Education: Ruhr University Bochum
- Occupation: politician, lawyer (for banking and investments)
- Website: matthias-hauer.de

Matthias Hauer (born 18 December 1977) is a German lawyer and politician of the Christian Democratic Union (CDU) who has been serving as a member of the Bundestag from the state of North Rhine-Westphalia since 2013.

In addition to his work in parliament, Hauer has been serving as a Parliamentary State Secretary at the Federal Ministry of Research in the government of Chancellor Friedrich Merz since 2025.

== Political career ==
Hauer first became a member of the Bundestag in the 2013 German federal election, representing the Essen III district. In parliament, he was a member of the Committee on the Digital Agenda (2018–2025) and the Finance Committee (2013–2025). In this capacity, he was the parliament's rapporteur on the Wirecard scandal.

In addition to his committee assignments, Hauer is part of the German Parliamentary Friendship Group for Relations with the States of Central America.

Since 2015, Hauer has been leading the CDU in Essen.

In the negotiations to form a Grand Coalition between the Christian Democrats (CDU together with the Bavarian CSU) under the leadership of Friedrich Merz and the SPD following the 2025 German elections, Hauer was part of the CDU/CSU delegation in the working group on public finances, led by Mathias Middelberg, Florian Oßner and Dennis Rohde.

== Other activities ==
=== Corporate boards ===
- Stadtwerke Essen, Member of the Supervisory Board (since 2020)
- Sparkasse Essen, Member of the Supervisory Board (since 2013)

=== Non-profit organizations ===
- Federal Financial Supervisory Authority (BaFin), Member of the Administrative Council (since 2017)
- Bundesstiftung Magnus Hirschfeld, Alternate Member of the Board of Trustees (2013–2022)

== Political positions ==
In June 2017, Hauer voted against his parliamentary group’s majority and in favor of Germany’s introduction of same-sex marriage.

Ahead of the Christian Democrats’ leadership election in 2021, Hauer publicly endorsed Armin Laschet to succeed Annegret Kramp-Karrenbauer as the party’s chair. For the 2021 national elections, he later supported Laschet as the Christian Democrats' joint candidate to succeed Chancellor Angela Merkel. Following Laschet's resignation and ahead of the Christian Democrats’ leadership election in December 2021, he endorsed Norbert Röttgen.
