= Matthias Kraume =

German chemical and process engineer

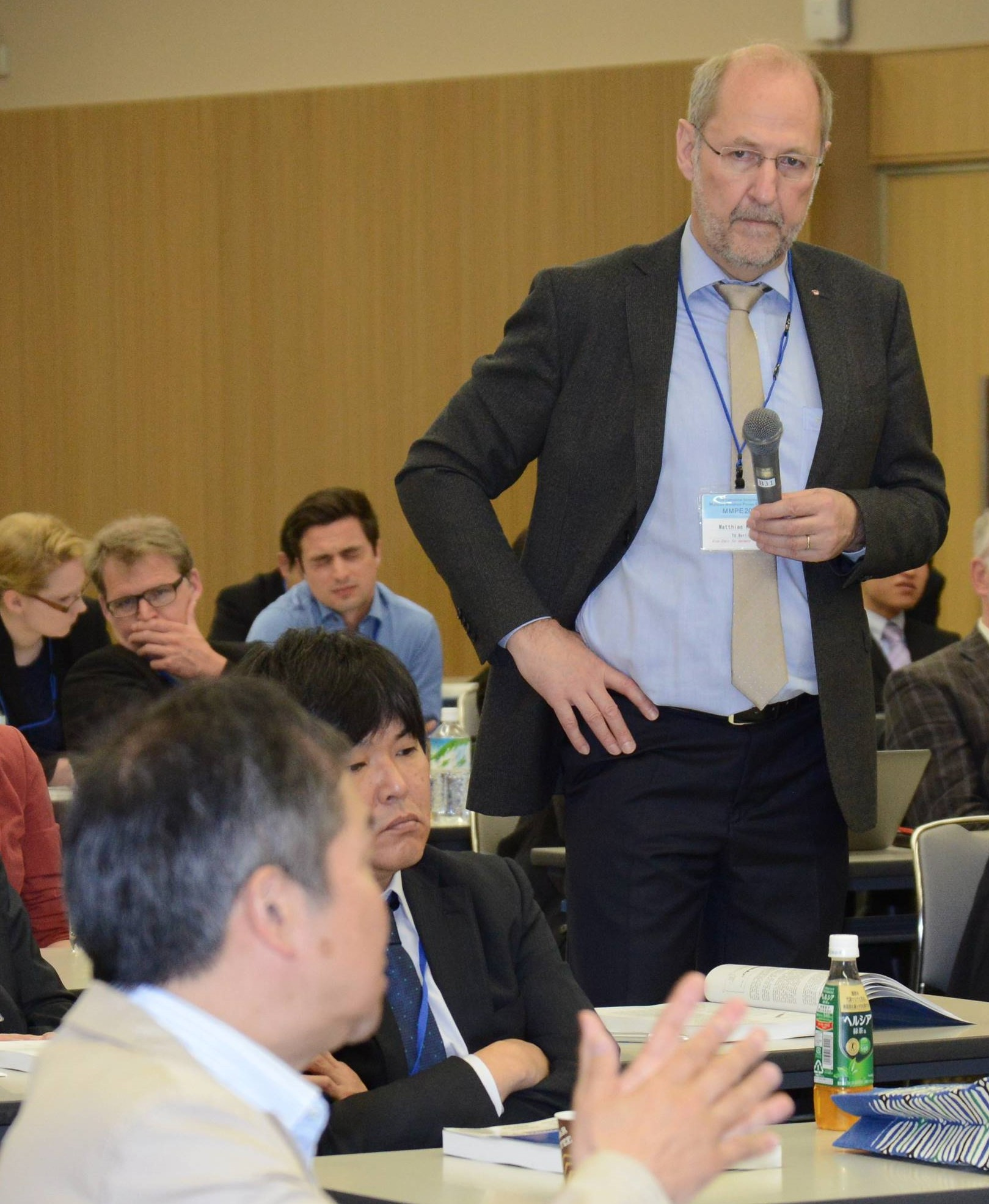
- Matthias Kraume (MMPE, 2017)
- Born: 13 December 1955 (age 70); Hagen, West Germany
- Education: TU Dortmund University (1980, PhD)
- Scientific career
- Fields: Chemical engineering; Process engineering
- Workplaces: Technische Universität Berlin; BASF

Matthias Kraume (born 13 December 1955) is a German chemical and process engineer and university professor. He is a professor of process engineering at Technische Universität Berlin and a member of the advisory board of Chemie Ingenieur Technik (CIT), the monthly journal of the Society of German Chemists (GDCh).

== Education and career ==
After primary school and high school in Hagen, Kraume studied chemical engineering at the TU Dortmund University from 1976 to 1982. He was then offered the position of a scientific assistant. He received his doctorate in 1985 on the subject of "Direct heat transfer in the condensation of vapor bubbles in a pipe" under the supervision of Paul-Michael Weinspach. Kraume then worked for nine years (1985-1994) as a research engineer at BASF in Ludwigshafen, before becoming a full professor of process engineering at the TU Berlin.

Kraume has played an integral role in three non-profit working groups, the EFCE working group "Mixing", the ProcessNet specialist group for mixing processes and the ProcessNet specialist group CFD, which are all part of DECHEMA. Dr. Matthias Kraume and Dr. Alberto Brucato have won the European Federation of Chemical Engineering's 2021 Nienow Lifetime Recognition Award in Mixing due to their outstanding contributions to mixing research and practice. In addition, Kraume is a member of the VDI-GVC (Association of German Engineers and Society for Chemical Engineering). Kraume is a founding member of three research associations: GRK 827: transport processes and moving phase interfaces (spokesperson); UniCat: Standardizing concepts in catalysis (member); and TRR 63: Integrated chemical processes in liquid multiphase systems (spokesperson).

== Research interest ==
Kraume founded several working groups in his department at the TU Berlin, which deal with the subject areas multiphase flow, transport processes in multiphase systems, reaction technology, membrane processes, and biological processes. His main focus is on the fundamental influence of fluid dynamics on these processes and their interactions with one another. He mostly concentrates on the basic operation of mixing. His work and research resulted in a standard work for the German-speaking area, the Handbook for Mixing and Stirring.

Kraume's work, with his students in the courses, on process engineering, initially based on the publications of Heinz Brauer, led to the second standard contribution of his work: Transportvorgänge in der Verfahrenstechnik. The intensive research work, which was always based on experimental validations, led to a leap innovation in process analytical technology, an automated inline measurement technology for particulate systems. In addition to providing technical support, Kraume also succeeded in accompanying an economic validation for this process analytical technology, which resulted in the establishment of SOPAT GmbH, a globally active specialist for the inline and real-time analysis of particular systems in industrial and academic practice.

== Selected publications ==
Kraume is the author or co-author of more than 487 publications A selection of the most influential ones were listed by the CIT.

- Sandra Rosenberger, U. Krüger, R. Witzig, W. Manz, Ullrich Szewzyk, Matthias Kraume, Performance of a Bioreactor with Submerged Membranes for Aerobic Treatment of Municipal Waste Water, Water Res. 2002, 36, 413–420.
- Sandra Rosenberger, Matthias Kraume, Filterability of Activated Sludge in Membrane Bioreactors, Desalination 2002, 146, 373–379.
- Sandra Rosenberger, Kirsten Kubin, Matthias Kraume, Rheology of Activated Sludge in Membrane Bioreactors, Eng. Life Sci. 2002, 2, 269–275.
- Ansor Gäbler, Mirco Wegener, Anja R. Paschedag, Matthias Kraume, The Effect of pH on Experimental and Simulation Results of Transient Drop Size Distributions in Stirred Liquid-Liquid Dispersions, Chem. Eng. Sci. 2006, 61, 3018–3024.
- Mirco Wegener, Jochen Grünig, Johan Stüber, Anja R. Paschedag, Matthias Kraume, Transient Rise Velocity and Mass Transfer of a Single Drop with Interfacial Instabilities – Experimental Investigations, Chem. Eng. Sci. 2009, 62, 2967–2978.
- Matthias Kraume, Anja Drews, Membrane Bioreactors in Waste Water Treatment – Status and Trends, Chem. Eng. Technol. 2010, 33, 1251–1259.
- Sebastian Maaß, Stefan Wollny, A. Voigt, M. Kraume, Experimental Comparison of Measurement Techniques for Drop Size Distributions in Liquid/Liquid Dispersions, Exp. Fluids 2011, 50, 259–269.
- Thomas Eppinger, Kevin Seidler, Matthias Kraume, DEM-CFD Simulations of Fixed Bed Reactors with Small Tube to Particle Diameter Ratios, Chem. Eng. J. 2011, 166 (1), 324–331.
- Matthias Kraume, Transportvorgänge in der Verfahrenstechnik, 2. bearb. Auflage, Springer-Vieweg, Wiesbaden 2012.
- Sebastian Maaß, Matthias Kraume, Determination of Breakage Rates Using Single Drop Experiments, Chem. Eng. Sci. 2012, 70, 146–164.
- Gregor D. Wehinger, Thomas Eppinger, Matthias Kraume, Detailed Numerical Simulations of Catalytic Fixed-Bed Reactors: Heterogeneous Dry Reforming of Methane, Chem. Eng. Sci. 2015, 122, 197–209.
