= ITH Pharma =

- Industry: Pharmaceutical
- Founded: London, England, UK (October 2008)
- Headquarters: London, United Kingdom
- Area served: UK
- Key people: Karen Hamling (Chief Operating Officer); Adam Bloom (Chief Executive Officer); Andrew Winstanley (Chief Commercial Officer)
- Products: Pharmaceuticals
- Website: ithpharma.com

ITH Pharma is a British compounding pharmaceutical company, founded in 2008 by pharmacists Adam Bloom and Karen Hamling.

The company operates from its main facility in London, where it houses its compounding and distribution operations.

In 2025, ITH Group Limited (the parent group of ITH Pharma) was acquired by an affiliate of H.I.G. Capital.

== History ==
In 1997 the founders identified a critical need in the healthcare system: the ability to provide complex intravenous treatments on a same-day basis. With this purpose, they launched their first compounding venture – Intra-Tech Healthcare.

In 1998 Intra-Tech Healthcare received its license from the Medicines and Healthcare products Regulatory Agency (MHRA), and soon after, secured a contract with the Royal Brompton Hospital in London. This partnership enabled the delivery of prefilled antibiotic syringes for children with cystic fibrosis.

After selling Intra-Tech Healthcare to Hospira, the founders established ITH Pharma in 2008, for pharmaceutical compounding in the UK.

In June 2025, an affiliate of H.I.G. Capital completed the acquisition of ITH Group Limited, the parent group of ITH Pharma, in partnership with founders Adam Bloom and Karen Hamling. H.I.G. said the existing management team would remain in place, with Bloom continuing as chief executive and Hamling as chief operating officer, and that the investment would support further initiatives including increasing production capacity.

== Core Services ==
ITH Pharma supplies:

- Chemotherapy,
- Total Parenteral Nutrition,
- Central Intravenous Additive Services (CIVAS)
- Oncology support medications
- Monoclonal Antibody treatments
- Antibiotic and antiviral infusions
- Pain management and palliative care solutions

== Quality and Compliance ==
The Medicines and Healthcare products Regulatory Agency (MHRA) has continued issuing Certificate of GDP Compliance to ITH Pharma. The latest MHRA inspection was conducted on 9 November 2021, and the certificate confirms compliance with Good Distribution Practice (GDP) under the Human Medicines Regulations 2012.

== ITH Pharma and the ITH Group ==
ITH Pharma operates as a core company within the ITH Group, an integrated set of companies committed to improving patient health. ITH Group encompasses several specialised entities, including:

- ITH Pharma
- ITH Health
- The Private Pharmacy
- ITH Laboratories
- ITH Systems

== Controversy ==
In June 2014, a batch of intravenous feed supplied to hospitals by ITH Pharma in the UK for neonatal care was delivered in an allegedly contaminated state, with about 16 alleged cases of blood poisoning in infants.

On 31 October 2018, the BBC reported that ITH Pharma were charged with a number of offences following the deaths and illness of babies in some hospitals in England. They were charged with seven counts of supplying medicinal product not of the quality specified in the prescription. They were also charged with failing to take reasonable steps to ensure patients are not infected by contaminants, in breach of the Health and Safety at Work Act. The babies, many of whom were premature, were being fed through drips in neonatal intensive care units because they were unable to feed on their own, between 2009 and 2014. ITH Pharma said it was disappointed by the decision to charge the company and would "vigorously defend" the case.

In January 2022, ITH Pharma entered guilty pleas to three charges, admitting supplying contaminated feed and expressing "We wish to extend our deepest sympathies to the families of the patients affected." ITH Pharma was ordered to pay £1.2m by a crown court in 2022 and accepted blame for providing infected TPN to 19 premature babies across nine hospitals in 2014.

== See also ==
- List of pharmaceutical manufacturers in the United Kingdom
- Compounding
