= ALK-Abelló =

Danish pharmaceutical company

ALK-Abelló A/S
- Type: Aktieselskab
- Traded as: Nasdaq Copenhagen: ALK B
- Industry: Pharmaceuticals
- Founded: 1923 Copenhagen
- Founder: Kaj Hedemann Baagøe Peter Barfod
- Headquarters: Hørsholm, Denmark
- Key people: Anders Hedegaard (Chairman); Peter Halling (CEO)
- Products: Acarizax, Grazax, SlitOneUltra, Alutard SQ, Jext
- Revenue: ▲DKK 4.824 billion (2023)
- Number of employees: 2,900 (2023)
- Website: alk.net alk.de alk.dk alk.fr alk.se alk.net.cn alk.it alk.no alk.fi

ALK-Abelló A/S (Nasdaq Copenhagen: ALK B), also commonly known as ALK, is a Denmark-based pharmaceutical company which specializes in the development and manufacturing of allergy immunotherapy (AIT) products for the prevention and treatment of allergy. It is one of the world's largest makers of allergy immunotherapy products (also known as ‘allergy vaccines’) with 67% of its revenue coming from sales in Europe.

== History ==
ALK-Abello dates back to 1923, when Denmark's first allergen extracts were produced at the pharmacy of the Copenhagen University Hospital. The company was subsequently established as Allergologisk Laboratorium København. The company has since focused on mapping the mechanisms of allergic impact on the immune system in order to develop new and improved allergy therapies. The research focuses on prevention, treatment, and management of allergies, especially hay fever and asthma. In 1925, Juan Abello Pascual founded Abello Pharmaceuticals in Spain.

In 1978, ALK released the first standardized line of products for the treatment of allergies. In 1992, ALK and Abello merged. In the 1990s, ALK was the first company to launch sublingual immunotherapy drops (allergy immunotherapy administered as droplets under the tongue). In recent years, ALK's research and development strategy has been focused on introducing a range of sublingual immunotherapy tablets (SLIT-tablets). The first, for grass pollen allergy, was launched in 2006, and was followed by SLIT-tablets for ragweed pollen allergy in 2014, and house dust mite allergy in 2016. The company is part-owned by the Lundbeck Foundation, however is also a publicly traded entity.

== Corporate information ==
ALK's stock is listed on the NASDAQ OMX Copenhagen Stock Exchange.

As of November 1, 2023, the current members of ALK's board of directors are:
Anders Hedegaard (Chairperson of the board, Chairperson of the Remuneration & Nomination Committee, Member of the Scientific Committee, Professional board member)

Lene Skole (Vice Chair, Member of the Remuneration & Nomination Committee, Member of the Scientific Committee, CEO Lundbeckfonden and directorships at two other subsidiaries)

Gitte Aabo (Chairperson of the Audit Committee, CEO of GN Hearing and GN Store Nord)

Lars Holmqvist (Member of the Audit Committee, Professional board member)

Jesper Høiland (Member of the Audit Committee, Strategic adviser, PharmaCo Consult ApS)

Bertil Lindmark (Chairperson of the Scientific Committee, Chief Medical Officer of Galecto A/S)

Alan Main (Member of the Remuneration & Nomination Committee, Senior adviser, Bamboo Capital Partners)

Katja Barnkob

Nanna Carlson

Lise Lund Mærkedahl

Johan Smedsrud

As of November 1, 2023, the members of ALK's board of management are:
Peter Halling (President and Chief Executive Officer)

Søren Niegel (Executive Vice President, Commercial Operations)

Ed Jordan (Executive Vince President, Commercial Operation North America)

Claus Steensen Sølje (Chief Financial Officer and Executive Vice President)

Christian Gauguin Houghton (Executive Vice President, Product Supply)

Lisbeth Kirk (Senior Vice President, People & Organisation)

Jan Engel Jensen (Senior Vice President, Global Quality Assurance)

== Operations ==
ALK employs 2,900 people worldwide. The company's global headquarters and its main research and development center are on the Scion DTU science and technology park in Hørsholm, Denmark, in the Capital Region of Denmark.

The company is present in 46 countries, either directly or via partnerships.

Other ALK facilities include:

- European production facilities in Hørsholm, Denmark, in Vanduille and Varennes, France, and in Madrid, Spain.
- North American production facilities in Port Washington, New York, in Post Falls, Idaho, in Luther, Iowa, and in Oklahoma City, Oklahoma.

== Products ==
Allergy immunotherapy products account for 88% of ALK's revenues and comprise three types of product:

- Sublingual immunotherapy tablets (SLIT-tablets) covering grass pollen, ragweed pollen and house dust mite allergies.
- Sublingual immunotherapy drops (SLIT-drops). A droplet-based allergy vaccine marketed under various brand names and covering approximately 40 different allergens and combinations of allergens, including pollens, molds, mites and pets.
- Subcutaneous immunotherapy (SCIT). An injection-based allergy vaccine marketed under various brand names and covering the most common allergens such as pollens, molds, mites, pets, bees and wasps.

The aforementioned allergy immunotherapy products are purified from natural allergen sources then combined with excipients during formulation.

Other ALK products include an emergency adrenaline autoinjector for people who experience anaphylaxis, allergy diagnostic kits, for example, skin prick tests, and bulk allergen extracts, mostly sold in the US to allergy specialists for use in their practices.

== Partnerships and collaborations ==
From 2006 until 2016, ALK had a strategic alliance with Merck & Co to develop and commercialize ALK's SLIT-tablet products in the United States, Canada and Mexico, granting Merck exclusive rights to develop, market and distribute the tablets for grass pollen allergy, house dust mite allergy and ragweed allergy in those markets. In June 2016, ALK and Merck & Co announced that the partnership would end by the end of 2016.

The company also has an alliance with Torii Pharmaceutical Co. Ltd to develop and commercialize ALK's house dust mite allergy immunotherapy products in Japan. The agreement covers the house dust mite SLIT-tablet, an injection-based immunotherapy product, and diagnostic products for house dust mite allergy. In addition, it established a research and development collaboration to develop a SLIT-tablet product for Japanese cedar pollen allergy.

In China, ALK had a collaboration with Eddingpharm which covered ALK's diagnostic skin prick test for house dust mite allergy, and a subcutaneous immunotherapy (SCIT) product, also for house dust mite allergy. Under the agreement, Eddingpharm handled sales and distribution, while ALK provided medical and scientific expertise. Announced in April 2014, the collaboration was to run for an initial seven years, provided certain performance targets were met. However, the agreement was terminated by ALK in 2016, in favor of a collaboration with a new distributor.

ALK also has had a collaboration with Abbott covering Russia and selected emerging markets, under which Abbott gained rights to distribute and commercialize ALK's SLIT-tablets for grass, ragweed, tree and house dust mite allergies. The agreement with Abbott was expanded in 2016, and allowed Abbott until the end of the collaboration in 2017 to register and sell ALK's house dust mite SLIT-tablet in seven markets in South-East Asia: Hong Kong, Malaysia, the Philippines, Singapore, South Korea, Taiwan and Thailand.

ALK also signed a collaboration with bioCSL (now name Seqirus) covering Australia and New Zealand which grants it exclusive rights to promote and sell ALK's SLIT-tablets against house dust mite and grass pollen allergy and its adrenaline auto-injector.

== Sponsorships ==
ALK is one of the founder sponsors of the European Academy of Allergy and Clinical Immunology (EAACI). It also sponsors and organizes an invitation-only biennial scientific symposium, the Symposium on Specific Allergy (SOSA). Since 2000, the company has sponsored the WAO Henning Løwenstein Research Award which is awarded to a young scientist who has shown excellence within the field of allergy. Since 2005, the award has been made every two years. The 2013 winner, received €10,000 (or an educational grant of corresponding value) and a travel grant to attend the 2013 European Academy of Allergy and Clinical Immunology (EAACI)/World Allergy Organization (WAO) Congress in Milan, Italy.

== Timeline ==
1923: Doctor Kaj Baagøe and pharmacist Peter Barfod produce Denmark's first pharmaceutically manufactured allergen extract at Copenhagen University Hospital (Rigshospitalet)
1949: Production of allergy vaccines and diagnostics is centered at an independent unit called Allergologisk Laboratorium (Allergology Laboratory)
1972: The technique to accurately identify the proteins that provoke allergies in individual patients is developed
1976: The first standardized process for allergen extracts (DAS 76) is developed
1978: The world's first standardized allergy immunotherapy product is launched
1984: ALK begins a period of global expansion by establishing a presence in several new markets and through strategic acquisitions
1990: The world's first product for sublingual immunotherapy drops (SLIT-drops) (droplets administered under the tongue) is launched
1990: The PAT (Preventative Allergy Treatment) study is initiated in collaboration with leading European allergy specialists. The study finds that allergy immunotherapy decreases the risk of the development of asthma in children with allergic rhinitis
1992: ALK acquires Alergia e Immunologia Abello S.A. (Abello), a Spanish company based in Madrid (with additional locations in Italy and Germany), its largest competitor at the time. Abello Pharmaceuticals was founded in 1925 by pharmacist Juan Abello Pascual and specialized in manufacturing oxygen- and alkaline-based therapeutics as well as synthetic hormones, among other processes and products.
2000: Acquires Center Laboratories, one of the leading suppliers of allergenic extracts in the U.S.
2006: The world's first registered sublingual immunotherapy tablet (SLIT-tablet), for grass pollen allergy, is launched
2007: An agreement is signed with Schering-Plough (which merged with Merck & Co. in November 2009) to develop, register and commercialize in North America a portfolio of SLIT-tablet treatments for grass, ragweed and house dust mite allergy
2009: The Grazax Asthma Prevention (GAP) trial, investigating the potential for preventing the development of asthma in children and adolescents is initiated.
2011: A new ALK-developed adrenaline auto-injector for the treatment of acute anaphylaxis is launched
2011: An agreement with Torii Pharmaceutical Co., Ltd. to develop, register and commercialize a number of SLIT-tablet products in Japan is signed. The agreement also covers selected existing ALK products and diagnostics against house dust mite allergy. It also covers a research and development contract to develop a sublingual immunotherapy tablet against Japanese cedar pollen allergy.
2014: The grass and ragweed SLIT-tablets are launched in the US.
2014: ALK signs collaboration agreements with Eddingpharm for China and Abbott for Russia and selected emerging markets.
2015: ALK signs a collaboration agreement with bioCSL (now Seqirus) covering Australia and New Zealand.
2016: ALK expands its partnership with Abbott to cover seven markets in South-East Asia and terminates its partnerships with Merck and EddingPharm.
2016: The house dust mite SLIT-tablet is launched in Europe and Japan.

2017: Inclusion in GINA. For the first time, allergy immunotherapy is recommended as a treatment option in the Global Initiative for Asthma (GINA) strategy document.

2017: New transformational growth strategy. ALK launches a new strategy to reach out to more people with allergy to become a broader-based allergy company.

2018: Launch of sister brand. Launch of ALK's sister brand klarify.me - offering a broad range of pre-screened products and services to help people manage their allergies.

2021: Entering food allergies. ALK announces an entry into food allergy treatment and begins developing a tablet for peanut allergies.

2023: ALK turns 100 years. ALK has been a pioneer in fighting allergies for 100 years.

== Research and development ==
Since launching the first SLIT-tablet (for grass allergy) in 2006, ALK has been developing tablets for other allergies, including tree, ragweed and house dust mite. Its strategy is to develop more patient-friendly treatments based on the approach of 're-educating' the immune system.
