= Merck Consumer Health =

- Company type: Division
- Industry: Consumer goods, Life Science
- Founded: 2001
- Founder: Friedrich Jacob Merck
- Headquarters: Darmstadt, Germany
- Area served: Worldwide
- Key people: Uta Kemmerich-Keil; President and CEO
- Products: Over-the-Counter Medicines, Women's Health products, Dietary supplement
- Revenue: € 753.64 million (2012)
- Number of employees: 2,000 (2012)
- Website: http://www.merck-consumer-health.com

Merck Consumer Health is a fully integrated division of the German chemical and pharmaceutical company Merck KGaA. It offers a wide range of over-the-counter products to consumers in more than 100 countries and belongs to the global top 20 of the most successful companies in the OTC industry. Consumer health has five subsidiaries worldwide: Seven Seas Ltd., Lamberts, Merck Médication Familiale, Merck Selbstmedikation, and Merck Consumer Health Care Shanghai Trading Company. In addition to these companies, the Consumer Health Care division operates businesses in Europe, Latin America, Asia and Africa.

Merck's over-the-counter products includes cough and cold remedies, diet supplements, everyday health supplements, and women's and children's health products. Europe accounts for around 65% of the global sales, 32% is made in Emerging Markets and 3% is achieved elsewhere.

In April 2018, P&G agreed to buy Merck Consumer Health for $4.2 billion.

== Consumer Health Products and Brands ==
Currently there are nine global brands, available in more than 100 countries including several countries in Europe, South America, Asia as well as Africa. Several subbrands and local brands like Multibionta, Flexagil or Haliborange are available in specific countries.

Merck Consumer Health main brands, include:

- Bion
- Femibion
- Sangobion
- Neurobion
- Cebion
- Nasivin
- Seven Seas
- Kytta
- Sedalmerck

== See also ==
- Merck KGaA
- Merck Serono
