= SHS International =

SHS International.
- Industry: Medical Nutrition
- Founded: 1879
- Headquarters: 100, Wavertree Boulevard, Liverpool, UK
- Products: Dietary products, Medical Nutrition, Metabolic Products
- Owner: Danone
- Website: http://www.shs-nutrition.com

SHS International, also known as SHS, specialises in Advanced Medical Nutrition for patients with needs in neo-natal or childhood cows’ milk allergy, those with lifelong metabolic disorders, paediatric epilepsy, individuals with Crohn’s, liver and kidney diseases.

SHS is a subsidiary of Nutricia, who in turn are part of Royal Numico NV, which is in the Danone Group.

== History ==
SHS was founded in 1879, when Henry Ernest Scholefield met Richard Powell forming a partnership. HE Scholefield’s first business premises were in St. Oswalds Street, Collyhurst, Manchester. R Powell had opened in Edge Hill, Liverpool. From the start they were both chemical manufacturers with the brewing industry as a major customer. Hydro-Sulphite of Lime was the main product they produced.

In 1889 Powell and Scholefield bought a property at 38 Queensland Street, Liverpool which became the main site for SHS right up until 1986.

Not content in depending on their home trade, special efforts were directed towards the colonies. In 1889 Hydro-Sulphite of Lime was awarded the Gold Medal at the Melbourne Exhibition.

In 1910 Powell & Scholefield became a limited company. The original shareholders were all members of both families. The company prospered even during the troubled years of the great war (1914–18). In the early 1930s business became difficult: growing unemployment, short time and cuts in wages forced most families to make economies; beer became a luxury. It was only a complete re-organisation of the board, injection of capital and the introduction of “Moabrite” an industrial cleaner that kept the company going.

In the late fifties Powell & Scholefield began developing processes to manufacture foodstuff free from the harmful phenylalanine for children suffering with PKU. Albumaid XP was one of the first phenylalanine free products ever made. This led to the formation of a subsidiary company, Scientific Hospital Supplies Ltd in 1960.

Scientific Hospital Supplies continued to develop a range of products including XP Analog and Neocate which were the first infant formulas that were amino acid-based. Maxamaid was the first flavoured phenylalanine free drink mix. Neocate 1+ was the first nutritionally complete, ready-to-drink amino acid-based medical food for children. Phlexy 10 was the first interchangeable system free from phenylalanine. In 1995 the FDA approved Neocate for use in infants up to one year of age. They have also produced the first flavourless free from phenylalanine product called Add-Ins.

In 1990 Valio Oy, via Valio, its UK holding company, acquired the SHS business from its existing family owners. Over the next four years Valio Oy played a non-interventionist role in the running of its UK business. During this period SHS won the Queen's award for export in 1991 and 1993.

During 1994 Valio Oy embarked on a reorganization to change its status from a co-operative to a limited company in preparation for Finland joining the EC. The new Chief Executive Officer decided to sell all the international businesses that Valio Oy had acquired and return to its core dairy activities. In February 1994 SHS was put up for sale to the highest bidder.

On 3 February 1995 Nutricia acquired SHS. At the time, Nutricia was the non-trading holding company for NV Nutricia's UK activities.

SHS again won another Queen’s award in 2003. This time it was the Queen’s award for enterprise.

In 2005, SHS supported a year-long trial with Birmingham Children’s Hospital to test the theory that home delivery of dietary products in inherited metabolic disorders reduces prescription and dispensing errors. The study found that long term use of HDS for EDP in IMD is safer, effective and more reliable than conventional systems

In 2010 SHS changed its branding to be known as Nutricia to fall in line with all other Nutricia supply points. The name SHS International now only exists as a trading name for the Liverpool factory and is no longer visual on site.
