= Process analytical technology =

Type of technology

Process analytical technology (PAT) has been defined by the United States Food and Drug Administration (FDA) as a mechanism to design, analyze, and control pharmaceutical manufacturing processes through the measurement of critical process parameters (CPP) which affect the critical quality attributes (CQA).

The concept aims at understanding the processes by defining their CPPs, and accordingly monitoring them in a timely manner (preferably in-line or on-line) and thus being more efficient in testing while at the same time reducing over-processing, enhancing consistency and minimizing rejects.

The FDA has outlined a regulatory framework for PAT implementation. With this framework – according to Hinz – the FDA tries to motivate the pharmaceutical industry to improve the production process. Because of the tight regulatory requirements and the long development time for a new drug, the production technology is "frozen" at the time of conducting phase-2 clinical trials.

Generally, the PAT initiative from FDA is only one topic within the broader initiative of "Pharmaceutical cGMPs for the 21st century – A risk based approach".

== The basics ==
PAT is a term used for describing a broader change in pharmaceutical manufacturing from static batch manufacturing to a more dynamic approach. It involves defining the Critical Process Parameters (CPPs) of the equipment used to make the product, which affect the Critical Quality Attributes (CQAs) of the product and then controlling these CPPs within defined limits. This allows manufacturers to produce products with consistent quality and also helps to reduce waste & overall costs.

This mechanism for producing consistent product quality & reducing waste presents a good case for utilising continuous manufacturing technologies. The control of a steady state process when you understand the upstream & downstream effects is an easier task as common cause variability is easier to define and monitor.

== The variables ==
It would be acceptable to consider that raw materials used to manufacture pharmaceutical products can vary in their attributes e.g. moisture content, crystal structure etc. It would also be acceptable to consider that manufacturing equipment does not always operate in exactly the same fashion due to the inherent tolerance of the equipment and its components. It is therefore logical to say that variability in raw materials married with a static batch process with inherent variability in process equipment produces variable product. This is on the basis that a static batch process produces product by following a fixed recipe with fixed set-points.

With this in mind the PAT drive is to have a dynamic manufacturing process that compensates for variability both in raw materials & equipment to produce a consistent product.

== PAT implementation ==
The challenge to date with PAT for pharmaceutical manufacturers is knowing how to start. A common problem is picking a complex process and getting mired in the challenge of collecting and analyzing the data.

The following criteria serve as a basic framework for successful PAT roll-outs: (From A PAT Primer)

- Picking a simple process. (Think water for injection (WFI) or building monitoring system (BMS)
- All details and nuances are well understood and explained for that process.
- Determine what information is easily collected and accessible through current instrumentation.
- Understanding the appropriate intervals for collecting that data.
- Evaluating the tools available for reading and synchronizing the data.

== PAT tools ==
In order to implement a successful PAT project, a combination of three main PAT tools is essential:

- Multivariate data acquisition and data analysis tools: usually advanced software packages which aid in design of experiments, collection of raw data and statistically analyzing this data in order to determine what parameters are CPP.
- Process analytical chemistry (PAC) tools: in-line and on-line analytical instruments used to measure those parameters that have been defined as CPP. These include mainly near infrared spectroscopy (NIRS); but also include biosensors, Raman spectroscopy, fiber optics and others.
- Continuous improvement and/or knowledge management tools: paper systems or software packages which accumulate Quality Control data acquired over time for specific processes with the aim of defining process weaknesses and implementing and monitoring process improvement initiatives. These products may be the same or separated from the statistical analysis tools above.

== Long-term goals ==
The long-term goals of PAT are to:

- reduce production cycling time
- prevent rejection of batches
- enable real time release
- increase automation and control
- improve energy and material use
- facilitate continuous processing

Currently NIR spectroscopy applications dominate the PAT projects. A possible next-generation solution is Energy Dispersive X-Ray Diffraction (EDXRD). For a detailed review of PAT tools see Scott, or Roggo. For an example of application see Gendre.

Although the FDA's PAT initiative encourages process control based on the real-time acquired data, a small part of PAT applications goes beyond monitoring the processes and follows the PACT (‘Process Analytically Controlled Technology’) approach.

== MVA in PAT ==
Fundamental to process analytical technology (PAT) initiatives are the basics of multivariate analysis (MVDA) and design of experiments (DoE). This is because analysis of the process data is a key to understand the process and keep it under multivariate statistical control.
