= Quality by design =

Quality control method

Quality by design (QbD) is a concept first outlined by quality expert Joseph M. Juran in publications, most notably Juran on Quality by Design. Designing for quality and innovation is one of the three universal processes of the Juran Trilogy, in which Juran describes what is required to achieve breakthroughs in new products, services, and processes. Juran believed that quality could be planned, and that most quality crises and problems relate to the way in which quality was planned.

While quality by design principles have been used to advance product and process quality in industry, and particularly the automotive industry, they have also been adopted by the U.S. Food and Drug Administration (FDA) for the discovery, development, and manufacture of drugs.

== Juran on quality by design ==
The Juran Trilogy defines the word "quality" as having two meanings: first, the presence of features that create customer satisfaction; second, the reliability of those features. Failures in features create dissatisfactions, so removing failures is the purpose of quality improvement, while creating features is the purpose of quality by design. Juran's process seeks to create features in response to understanding customer needs. These are customer-driven features. The sum of all features is the new product, service, or process.

The quality by design model consists of the following steps:

1. Establish the project design targets and goals.
2. Define the market and customers that will be targeted.
3. Discover the market, customers, and societal needs.
4. Develop the features of the new design that will meet the needs.
5. Develop or redevelop the processes to produce the features.
6. Develop process controls to be able to transfer the new designs to operations.

It is not a statistical design method like Design for Six Sigma.

=== Integrated planning ===
Integrated planning requires a team with a leader whose sole accountability is for the total success of the new product from defining the opportunity through customer purchase, use, service, and recommendation to others. This team leader reports directly to a senior executive, or the team leader can be a senior executive. Each team member's job is to ensure the success of the new product. In addition to organizational integration, a successful team must begin with clearly articulated common goals for the product that are measurable and authorized by the enterprise. These goals must, at a minimum, cover such elements as:

- The customers or customer segments to be served by the new product
- The relative and absolute quality goals
- The volume of sales or revenue to be generated in an initial time period and for the long run
- Market share, penetration, or sales relative to key competitors
- The release date

The team will follow a structured process. The structure is the common framework for all participants in launching the new product and helps ensure success.

=== Customer-focused optimization ===
Quality by design starts and ends with the customer. Every new product introduction has some amount of trade-off involved. If there are multiple customers, they may have conflicting needs. Even the same customer may have needs that compete with each other. Capacity and speed compete with cost of operation. Capacity can compete with speed. Flexibility and feature-rich offerings may have reduced ease of use, and so on.

Quality by design offers a range of tools and methods intended to make these tradeoffs explicit and optimal for the customer. Some tools are highly mathematical, and others relate more to customer behavior. Quality by design sets strong expectations for creative approaches to functional design, product features and goals, and production design.

=== Control over variation and transfer to operations ===
Quality by design incorporates modern tools to preemptively control variation. These tools and methods begin by measuring and understanding the variation that exists by using historical data, testing, and modeling to help forecast, analyze, and eliminate the deleterious effects of variation using standard statistical techniques. Process control consists of three basic activities:

1. Evaluate the actual performance of the process
2. Compare actual performance with goals
3. Take action on the difference

The final activity of the quality by design process is to implement the plan and validate that the transfer has occurred.

== Pharmaceutical quality by design ==
The FDA imperative is outlined in its report "Pharmaceutical Quality for the 21st Century: A Risk-Based Approach." In the past few years, the agency has implemented the concepts of QbD into its pre-market processes. The focus of this concept is that quality should be built into a product with an understanding of the product and process by which it is developed and manufactured along with a knowledge of the risks involved in manufacturing the product and how best to mitigate those risks. This is a successor to the "quality by QC" (or "quality after design") approach that the companies have taken up until the 1990s.

The QbD initiative, which originated from the Office of Biotechnology Products (OBP), attempts to provide guidance on pharmaceutical development to facilitate design of products and processes that maximizes the product's efficacy and safety profile while enhancing product manufacturability.

=== QbD activities within FDA ===
The following activities are guiding the implementation of QbD:

- In FDA's Office of New Drug Quality Assessment (ONDQA), a new risk-based pharmaceutical quality assessment system (PQAS) was established based on the application of product and process understanding.
- Implementation of a pilot program to allow manufacturers in the pharmaceutical industry to submit information for a new drug application demonstrating use of QbD principles, product knowledge, and process understanding. In 2006, Merck & Co.'s Januvia became the first product approved based upon such an application.
- Implementation of a Question-based Review (QbR) Process has occurred in CDER's Office of Generic Drugs.
- CDER's Office of Compliance has played a role in complementing the QbD initiative by optimizing pre-approval inspection processes to evaluate commercial process feasibility and determining if a state of process control is maintained throughout the lifecycle, in accord with the ICH Q10 lifecycle Quality System.
- First QbD Approval - including design space - for Biologic License Application (BLA) is Gazyva (Roche)

While QbD will provide better design predictions, there is also a recognition that industrial scale-up and commercial manufacturing experience provides knowledge about the process and the raw materials used therein. FDA's release of the Process Validation guidance in January 2011 notes the need for companies to continue benefiting from knowledge gained, and continually improve throughout the process lifecycle by making adaptations to assure root causes of manufacturing problems are corrected.

=== ICH activities ===
Working with regulators in the European Union (the European Medicines Agency) and Japan, the FDA has furthered quality by design objectives through the International Conference on Harmonisation of Technical Requirements for Registration of Pharmaceuticals for Human Use. The ICH Guidelines Q8 through Q11 encapsulate these unified recommendations and provide some assistance for manufacturers to implement quality by design into their own operations. ICH Guideline Q8 describes QbD-based drug formulation development and was first published in 2004, being subsequently revised in 2008 (Q8(R2)). The ICH Guideline Q9 describes Quality Risk Management plans, Q10 explains Pharmaceutical Quality Systems, and Q11 refer to the development of active pharmacological substances including biologicals.

In November 2017, the ICH issued Guideline Q12 for public consultation to extend the recommendations for the Product Lifecycle Management Plan that were initially defined in the Guideline Q10. According to the ICH, Guideline Q13 will extend the previous guidelines to accommodate continuous pharmaceutical manufacturing and Q2 (Analytical Validation) will be revised and extended into the guideline Q2(R2)/Q14 to include Analytical quality by design or AQbD.

The ICH Steering Committee meets twice a year to discuss the progress of its efforts. This practical input should help ensure that quality risk management and knowledge management are used to make lifecycle adaptations that maintain process control and product quality.

== See also ==
- Laboratory quality control
- Quality control
