= Salts Healthcare =

British medical equipment manufacturer

Salts Healthcare Ltd
- Type: Limited Company
- Industry: Healthcare
- Founded: 1700s
- Founder: John and William Salt
- Headquarters: United Kingdom, Aston, Birmingham
- Area served: United Kingdom, Worldwide
- Products: Ostomy and orthotics products
- Number of employees: 640
- Website: salts.co.uk

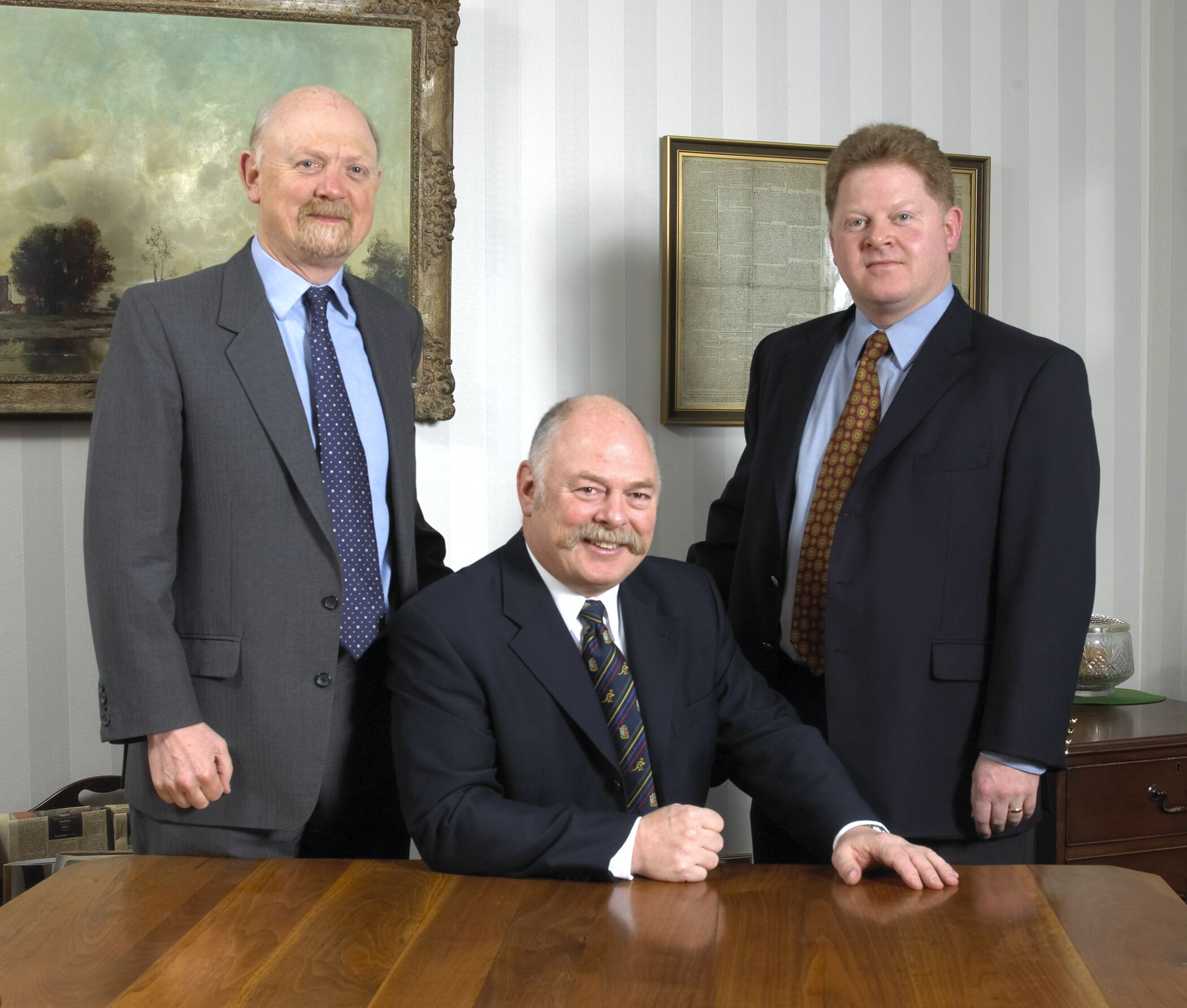
Salt Brothers Peter (Chief Executive), Philip and Robert (managing director)

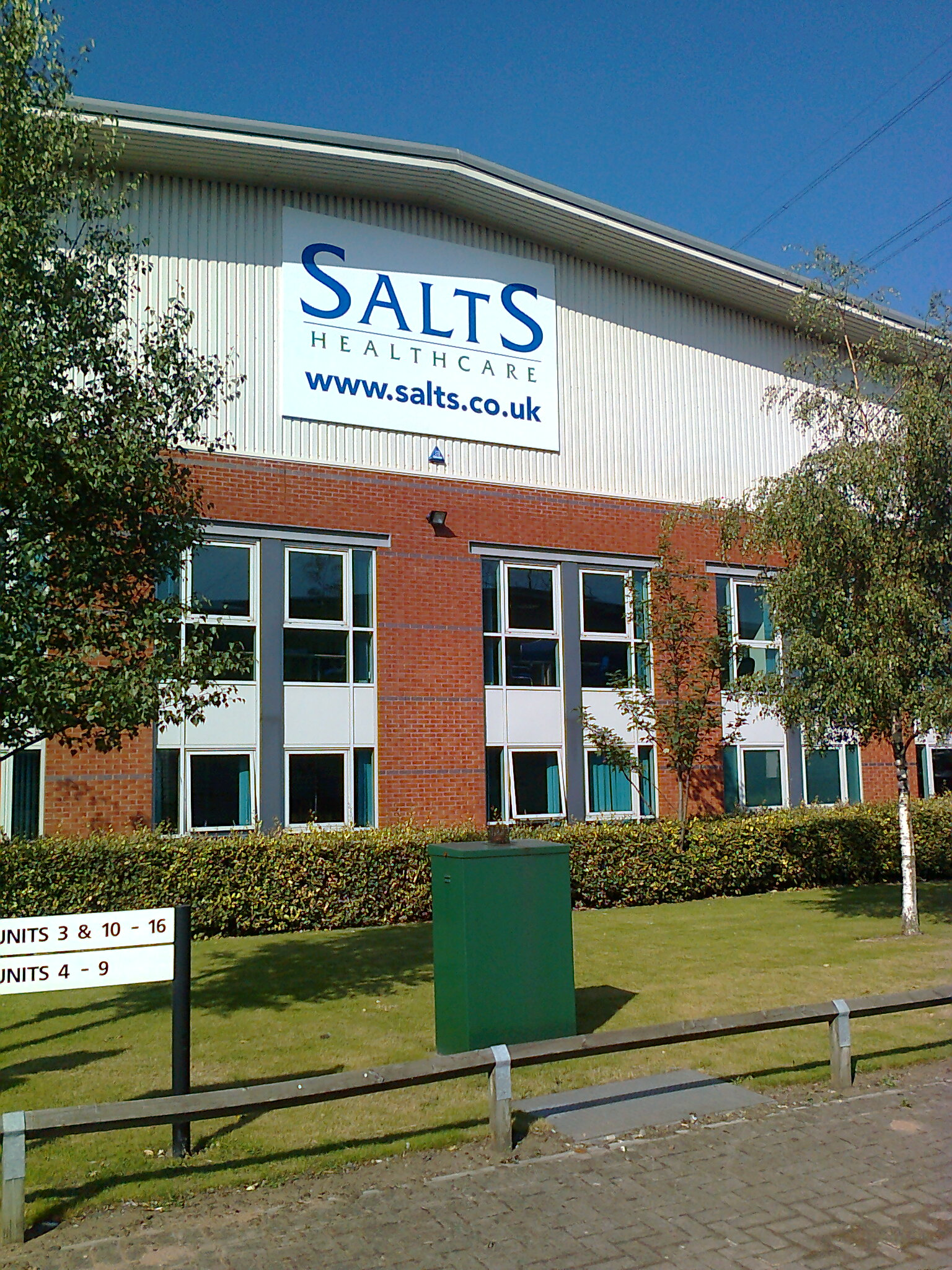
Salts Healthcare Distribution Centre

Salts Healthcare is one of the UK's oldest family-run manufacturing companies, based in Aston, Birmingham. It manufactures ostomy and orthotic products. Salts Healthcare has a network of customer care centres that provide home delivery of all stoma and incontinence products. These centres also provide advisors and stoma care nurses to support their prescription customers.

== History of Salts Healthcare ==
Brothers John and William Salt started out as apprentice locksmiths in Wolverhampton in the early 1700s. Using the skills gained from his apprenticeship, John Salt became a well established surgeons' instrument maker and cutler. He handed the business over to his son William Salt in 1755 who had been learning the family trade as a journeyman with Mr. La Roche in Silver Street London. Manufacturing surgeons' instruments remained the focus of the business but because surgeons' instruments are not replaced often, Salts started manufacturing new medical devices. After William's death in 1793 the business was passed onto Richard Salt who in the 1800s relocated the factory to larger premises in Dale End, Birmingham. Richard Salt opened a second site in Coleshill Street. The death of Richard forced quite a remarkable change in the business, with Sarah (Richard's wife) taking control for a short while. She then handed the business over to Thomas Partridge Salt. Thomas died at the age of 45 during a Cholera epidemic. In 1845 the business was once again moved to bigger premises by Mary and Thomas Partridge II, to Bull Street. During this period the factory was moved to Cherry Street. By the end of the 19th century, trade in Birmingham was improving and so was the Salts' business, achieving the Royal Seal of Approval and becoming in 1845 Cutlers to Her Majesty. Still focusing on surgeons' instruments and truss manufacture in 1863 Salts was granted the Royal Warrant to become Cutlers to the Emperor of the French in 1867. In that same year Salts was awarded an Honorable Mention at the Paris Universal Exhibition.

The business now being led by Thomas Partridge II along with Ashton T. Salt was manufacturing a wide range of appliances and attending to various conditions, from amputations to back complaints. Thomas Partridge II, being an expert in his field even published the books: A practical treatise on rupture: Its Causes, Management and Cure, and Various Mechanical Contrivances Employed for its Relief, and A Treatise on Deformities and Debilities of the Lower Extremities.

Manufacturing surgical instruments and anatomical mechanicians left Salts relatively unaffected by the economic depression of 1866–1868, being able to cease cutlery manufacture in the last quarter of the 19th century, to focus on the manufacture of Orthopedic devices. This led to the patent of the Orthonemic Truss. Demand for medical products continued to grow into the early 20th century and with the outbreak of World War One Salts found itself manufacturing artificial limbs for serviceman injured during the war. 1945 brought about changes to the National Health Service which led to contract changes for limb makers, leaving Salts looking to change its focus.

Three years later Professor Brian Brooke from Birmingham General Hospital approached Salts to see if it could make collection devices similar to the ones he had seen produced in the US. When requests to the American manufacturer for a supply or licensing agreement failed Salts decided to manufacture a limited range of handmade "collection" bags. Although manufacturing the bags was not very profitable, Salts looked to improve the lifestyle of stoma patients, which led to the research and development of an entire range of stoma care products.

Today Salts functions with a head office and distribution centre in Birmingham and two Salt family brothers playing an active role in the business.
