= Process validation =

Process validation is the analysis of data gathered throughout the design and manufacturing of a product in order to confirm that the process can reliably output products of a determined standard. Regulatory authorities like EMA and FDA have published guidelines relating to process validation. The purpose of process validation is to ensure varied inputs lead to consistent and high quality outputs. Process validation is an ongoing process that must be frequently adapted as manufacturing feedback is gathered. End-to-end validation of production processes is essential in determining product quality because quality cannot always be determined by finished-product inspection. Process validation can be broken down into 3 steps: process design (Stage 1a, Stage 1b), process qualification (Stage 2a, Stage 2b), and continued process verification (Stage 3a, Stage 3b).

== Stage 1: Process Design ==
In this stage, data from the development phase are gathered and analyzed to define the commercial manufacturing process. By understanding the commercial process, a framework for quality specifications can be established and used as the foundation of a control strategy. Process design is the first of three stages of process validation. Data from the development phase is gathered and analyzed to understand end-to-end system processes. These data are used to establish benchmarks for quality and production control.

=== Design of experiment (DOE) ===
Design of experiments is used to discover possible relationships and sources of variation as quickly as possible. A cost-benefit analysis should be conducted to determine if such an operation is necessary.

=== Quality by design (QBD) ===
Quality by design is an approach to pharmaceutical manufacturing that stresses quality should be built into products rather than tested in products; that product quality should be considered at the earliest possible stage rather than at the end of the manufacturing process. Input variables are isolated in order to identify the root cause of potential quality issues and the manufacturing process is adapted accordingly.

=== Process analytical technology (PAT) ===
Process analytical technology is used to measure critical process parameters (CPP) and critical quality attributes (CQA). PAT facilitates measurement of quantitative production variables in real time and allows access to relevant manufacturing feedback. PAT can also be used in the design process to generate a process qualification.

=== Critical process parameters (CPP) ===
Critical process parameters are operating parameters that are considered essential to maintaining product output within specified quality target guidelines.

=== Critical quality attributes (CQA) ===
Critical quality attributes (CQA) are chemical, physical, biological, and microbiological attributes that can be defined, measured, and continually monitored to ensure final product outputs remain within acceptable quality limits. CQA are an essential aspect of a manufacturing control strategy and should be identified in stage 1 of process validation: process design. During this stage, acceptable limits, baselines, and data collection and measurement protocols should be established. Data from the design process and data collected during production should be kept by the manufacturer and used to evaluate product quality and process control. Historical data can also help manufacturers better understand operational process and input variables as well as better identify true deviations from quality standards compared to false positives. Should a serious product quality issue arise, historical data would be essential in identifying the sources of errors and implementing corrective measures.

== Stage 2: Process Performance Qualification ==
In this stage, the process design is assessed to conclude if the process is able to meet determined manufacturing criteria. In this stage all production processes and manufacturing equipment is proofed to confirm quality and output capabilities. Critical quality attributes are evaluated, and critical process parameters taken into account, to confirm product quality. Once the process qualification stage has been successfully accomplished, production can begin. Process Performance Qualification is the second phase of process validation.

== Stage 3: Continued Process Verification ==
Continued process verification is the ongoing monitoring of all aspects of the production cycle. It aims to ensure that all levels of production are controlled and regulated. Deviations from prescribed output methods and final product irregularities are flagged by a process analytics database system. The FDA requires production data be recorded (FDA requirements (§ 211.180(e)). Continued process verification is stage 3 of process validation.

The European Medicines Agency defines a similar process known as ongoing process verification. This alternative method of process validation is recommended by the EMA for validating processes on a continuous basis. Continuous process verification analyses critical process parameters and critical quality attributes in real time to confirm production remains within acceptable levels and meets standards set by ICH Q8, Pharmaceutical Quality Systems, and Good manufacturing practice.

== See also ==
- Cleaning validation
- Process qualification
- Verification and validation
