= Stefan Keuter =

German politician

Member of the Bundestag
- Incumbent
- Assumed office 24 October 2017

Personal details
- Born: 19 August 1972 (age 53)
- Party: AfD

Stefan Keuter (born 19 August 1972) is a German politician for the far-right Alternative for Germany (AfD) and a member of the Bundestag since 2017.

== Life and politics ==
Keuter was born 1972 in the West German city of Essen and became an entrepreneur. Keuter entered the newly founded populist AfD and became a member of the Bundestag after the 2017 German federal election. Die Zeit described Keuters political positions within AfD after his election 2017 as "ultra right".

Stefan Keuter is known for his strong ties to the Russian government. When the Russian invasion of Ukraine had started, he took part in a conference entitled "Economy against sanctions" with representatives of Russian politics and business in May 2022. One of the topics discussed was how best to deal with the international sanctions.

Keuter is deputy leader of AfD's parliamentary group.
