= Business process preservation =

Business Process Preservation (BPP) helps businesses save their important work steps (processes) digitally. This way, the processes can still be accessed and used far into the future. BPP figures out which steps are worth saving and how to do it in the most cost-effective way. They also create tools to capture these steps clearly, including the computer programs and equipment needed.

== Motivation ==
Business Process Preservation (BPP) becomes necessary for various reasons across different industries. In heavily regulated fields like pharmaceuticals and aircraft manufacturing, BPP ensures clear documentation of processes for audits, replication, or troubleshooting. Long-standing companies utilize BPP to manage their services through changes in technology. Organizations that rely on external services for risk management leverage BPP to guarantee all necessary information is included in their agreements. When businesses undergo major staff changes, BPP helps retain the knowledge needed to operate or restart production processes.

== Benefits ==
Academics benefit from BPP by accessing software and process information to validate research data and scientific claims. Additionally, BPP facilitates credit attribution in academia by providing details about research processes. BPP allows all businesses to analyze their processes for continuous improvement. Finally, museums and libraries use BPP to document the creation and preservation of their digital collections for future verification of authenticity and quality.

== Approach ==
The approach used by the EU co-funded TIMBUS project breaks business process preservation down into three functions:

1. Planning: performs risk analysis and determines the requirements for preserving the relevant business processes.
2. Preservation: preserves the business processes.
3. Redeployment: reactivates and reruns the business processes.
