= Medac =

German pharmaceutical company

medac
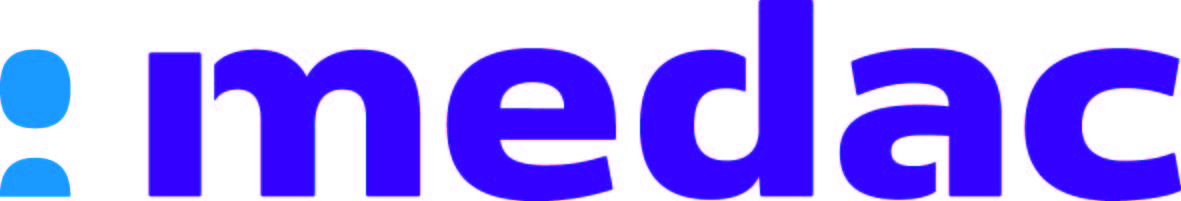
- Type: GmbH (Private company)
- Founded: 1970
- Headquarters: Wedel, Germany
- Area served: Worldwide
- Key people: Frank Lucaßen, Dr. Christian Matschke and Dr. Christoph Willers
- Revenue: approx. 551 Mio. EUR (2022/2023)
- Number of employees: approx. 2000 (2024)
- Website: http://www.medac-group.com

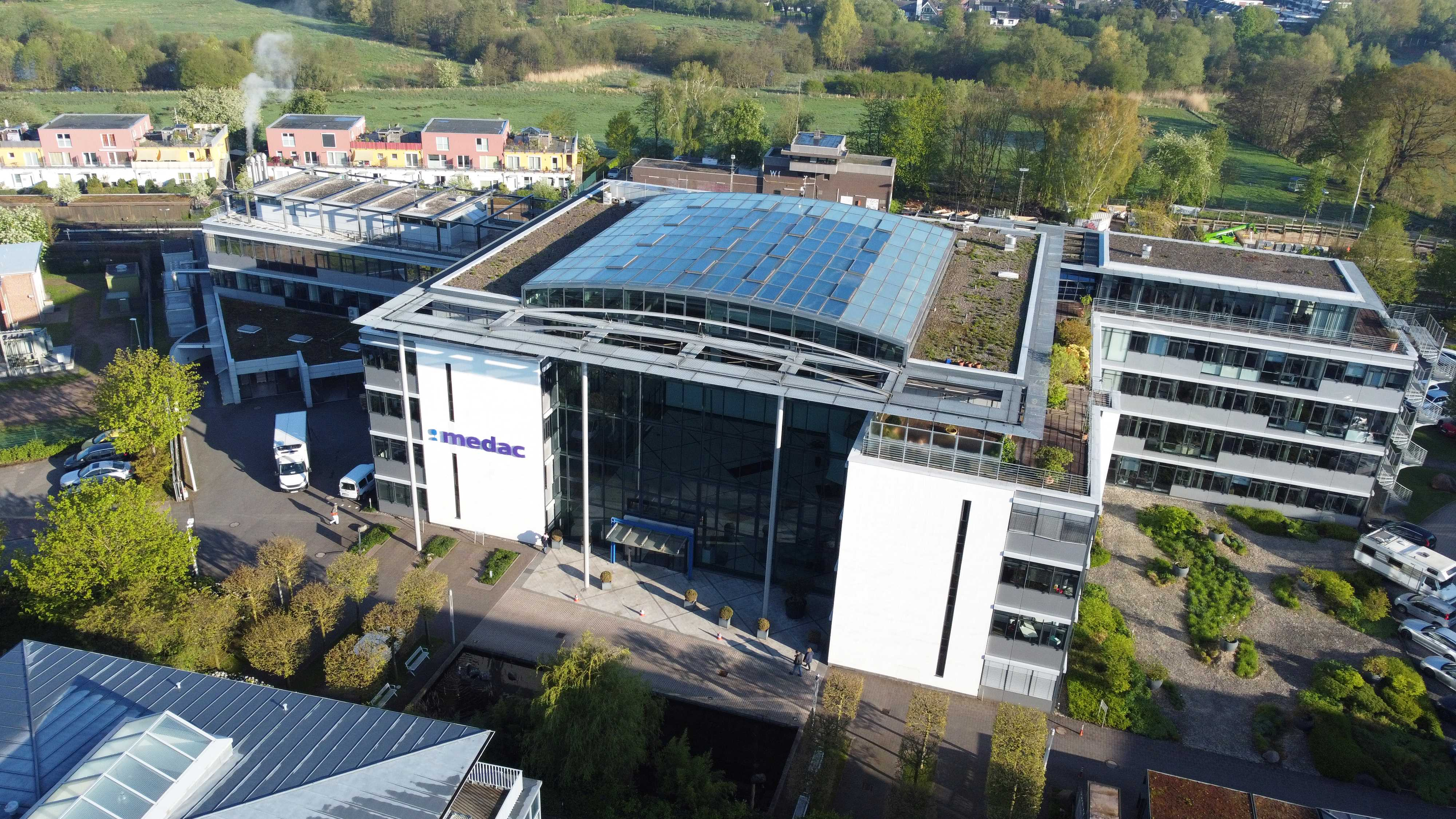
medac headquarter in Wedel

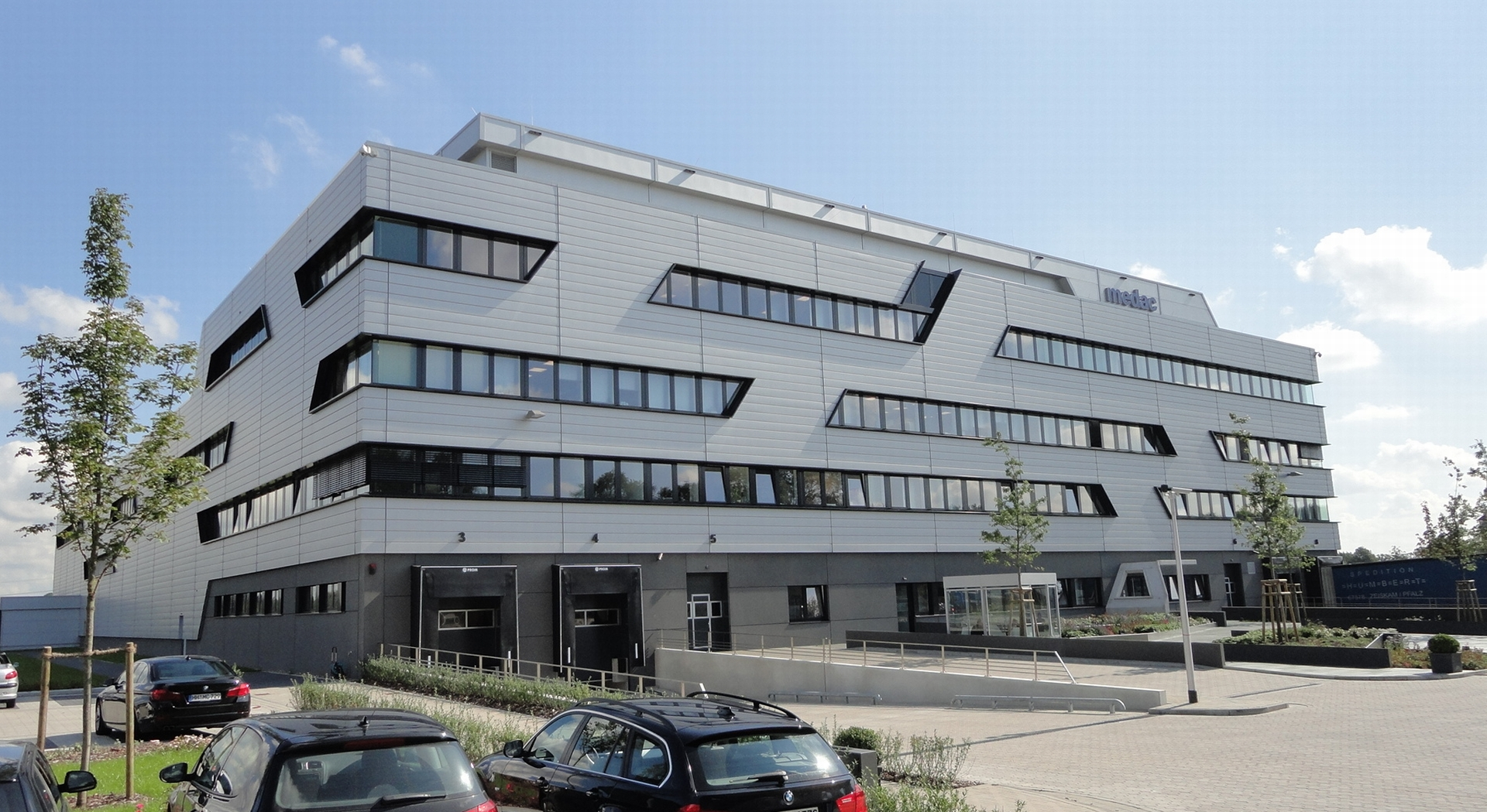
medac Logistikcenter in Tornesch

Medac GmbH (stylized as medac) is a German, worldwide operating pharmaceutical company based in Wedel near Hamburg and Tornesch, which is privately owned.

medac’s work focuses on the continuous improvement of already established pharmaceutical products, as well as on the development of new medicines in the fields of rheumatology, urology, hematology, and oncology. In addition, the company has extensive expertise in the diagnosis of infectious diseases and oncological diseases. The two wholly owned production subsidiaries in Dessau-Roßlau, Germany and in Brno, Czech Republic – produce, among other things, sterile medicines such as cytostatics.

The manufactured medicines and diagnostics are delivered to over 90 countries worldwide. medac has subsidiaries and branches in Czech Republic, Denmark, Finland, France, Germany, Great Britain Italy, Japan, Norway, Poland, Portugal, Slovakia, Sweden, and in United Arab Emirates .

== History ==
In April 1970, medac was founded in Hamburg by Wilfried Mohr, Claus-Olaf Welding, Werner Mai, and Ernst Voss. The company initially focused on the production of coagulation preparations and fibrinolytics. During this period, diagnostic products (antibodies) were also marketed. Shortly thereafter, medac concentrated on the therapeutic area of oncology and began marketing the product Mitomycin C.

Today, more than 50 oncological active substances in various dosage forms are offered for the treatment of numerous types of cancer, including BCG for intravesical instillation therapy in bladder cancer.

In the late 1980s, a further therapeutic area emerged with the treatment of autoimmune diseases. medac is now one of the leading suppliers of methotrexate, a folic acid antagonist used in the treatment of rheumatoid arthritis, available in numerous dosages and in easily administrable forms.

Between 1997 and 2005, Schering AG held 25% of the company's shares.

In May 2020, during the COVID-19 pandemic, medac presented an antibody test for SARS-CoV-2 as well as a PCR test for the direct detection of the virus.

In October 2020, Medac, represented by a national law firm, prevailed before the European Court of Justice that the preparation Treosulfan, which Medac manufactured itself, was classified as an orphan drug.

In January 2021, the drug Obnitix (cell therapy) developed by medac received the 2020 Innovation Prize from the German Pharmaceutical Journal (PZ).
