= Kai Gehring =

German politician (born 1977)

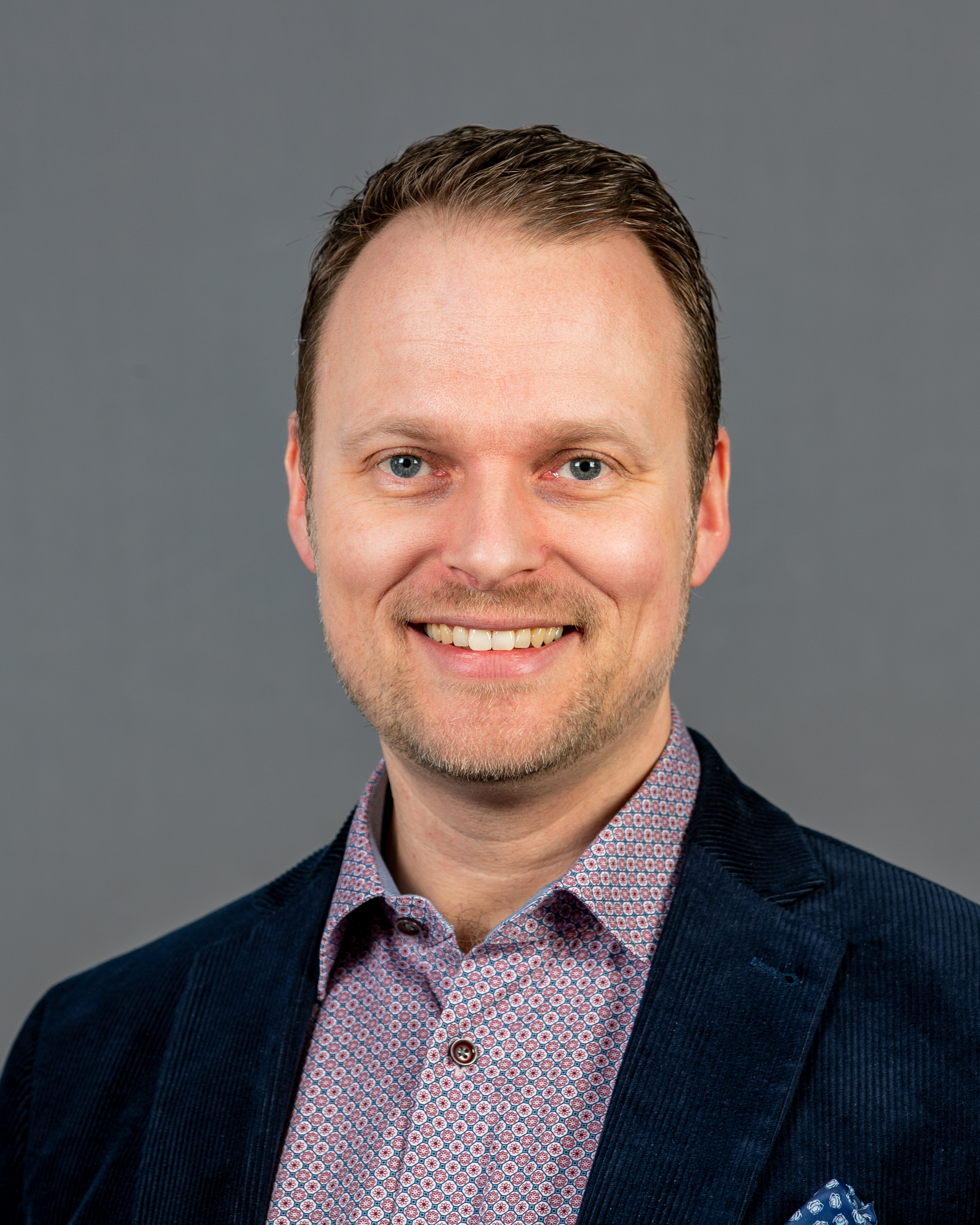

Member of the Bundestag
- In office 2005–2025

Personal details
- Born: 26 December 1977 (age 48) Mülheim, North Rhine-Westphalia, West Germany (now Germany)
- Party: Alliance '90/The Greens
- Education: Ruhr University Bochum
- Profession: Sociologist
- Website: www.kai-gehring.de

Kai Gehring (born 26 December 1977) is a German politician of the Green Party who served as a Member of the German Parliament from 2005 to 2025.

== Early life and education ==
After receiving his Abitur in Velbert, Gehring majored in social sciences at the Ruhr University Bochum, earning his Diplom in 2003.

== Political career ==
=== Career in state politics ===
Having joined the liberal party Alliance '90/The Greens in 1998, Gehring was part of the party’s leadership in North Rhine-Westphalia from 2000 until 2006, under chairwoman Sylvia Löhrmann.

=== Member of the German Parliament, 2005–2025 ===
Gehring was elected to the Bundestag in the 2005 federal election. In parliament, he served on the Committee on Education, Research and Technology Assessment. He was his parliamentary group’s spokesperson for youth (2005–2011), education (2011–2013), and universities (2005–2017). From 2018 until 2021, he also served on the Committee on Human Rights and Humanitarian Aid.

In addition to his committee assignments, Gehring served as deputy chairman of the German-Greek Parliamentary Friendship Group (2013–2017); the Parliamentary Friendship Group for Relations with Arabic-Speaking States in the Middle East (since 2018), which is in charge of maintaining inter-parliamentary relations with Bahrain, Irak, Yemen, Jordan, Qatar, Kuwait, Lebanon, Oman, Saudi Arabia, Syria, United Arab Emirates and the Palestinian territories; and the Parliamentary Friendship Group for Relations with the Central African States (since 2018).

In the negotiations to form a so-called traffic light coalition of the Social Democratic Party (SPD), the Green Party and the Free Democrats (FDP) following the 2021 German elections, Gehring was part of his party's delegation in the working group on innovation and research, co-chaired by Thomas Losse-Müller, Katharina Fegebank and Lydia Hüskens.

From December 2021, Gehring chaired the Committee on Education and Research.

In the negotiations to form a coalition government of the Christian Democratic Union (CDU) and the Green Party under Minister-President of North Rhine-Westphalia Hendrik Wüst following the 2022 state elections, Gehring was part of his party’s delegation in the working group on research, digitization and innovation, co-chaired by Anja Karliczek and Raoul Roßbach.

In June 2024, Gehring announced that he would not stand in the 2025 federal elections but instead resign from active politics by the end of the parliamentary term.

== Other activities ==
- German Foundation for Peace Research (DSF), Member of the Board (since 2022)
- Aktion Deutschland Hilft (Germany's Relief Coalition), Member of the Board of Trustees (since 2019)
- Evangelisches Studienwerk Villigst, Member of the Board of Trustees
- Federal Agency for Civic Education (BPB), Member of the Board of Trustees
- FernUniversität Hagen, Deputy Chairman of the Parliamentary Advisory Board
- German National Association for Student Affairs, Ex-Officio Member of the Board of Trustees
- Heinrich Böll Foundation, Member of the Advisory Board on Student Affairs
- Leibniz Association, Member of the Senate
- Otto Benecke Foundation, Member of the Board of Trustees
- Amnesty International, Member
- Lesbian and Gay Federation in Germany (LSVD), Member
