= Chemidex =

British pharmaceutical manufacturer

Chemidex Pharma was a British pharmaceutical manufacturer, owned by Navin Engineer and his wife Varsha Engineer, and based in Egham.

The company was founded in 1981.

According to the Sunday Times, the business is valued at £1 billion.
