= Critical process parameters =

Critical process parameters (CPP) in pharmaceutical manufacturing are key variables affecting the production process. CPPs are attributes that are monitored to detect deviations in standardized production operations and product output quality or changes in critical quality attributes. Those attributes with a higher impact on CQAs should be prioritized and held in a stricter state of control. The manufacturer should conduct tests to set acceptable range limits of the determined CPPs and define acceptable process variable variability. Operational conditions within this range are considered acceptable operational standards. Any deviation from the acceptable range will be indicative of issues within the process and the subsequent production of substandard products. Data relating to CPP should be recorded, stored, and analyzed by the manufacturer. CPP variables and ranges should be reevaluated after careful analysis of historical CPP data. Identifying CPPs is done in stage one of process validation: process design are an essential part of a manufacturing control strategy.

One method of defining CPPs is to look at the effect of certain production processes on critical quality attributes. Those production parameters which have a measurable effect on those quality attributes that have been identified as critical can be considered CPPs and must always be in a state of control.
