= Nutricia =

Healthcare company in the Netherlands

Danone Baby and Medical Nutrition B.V.

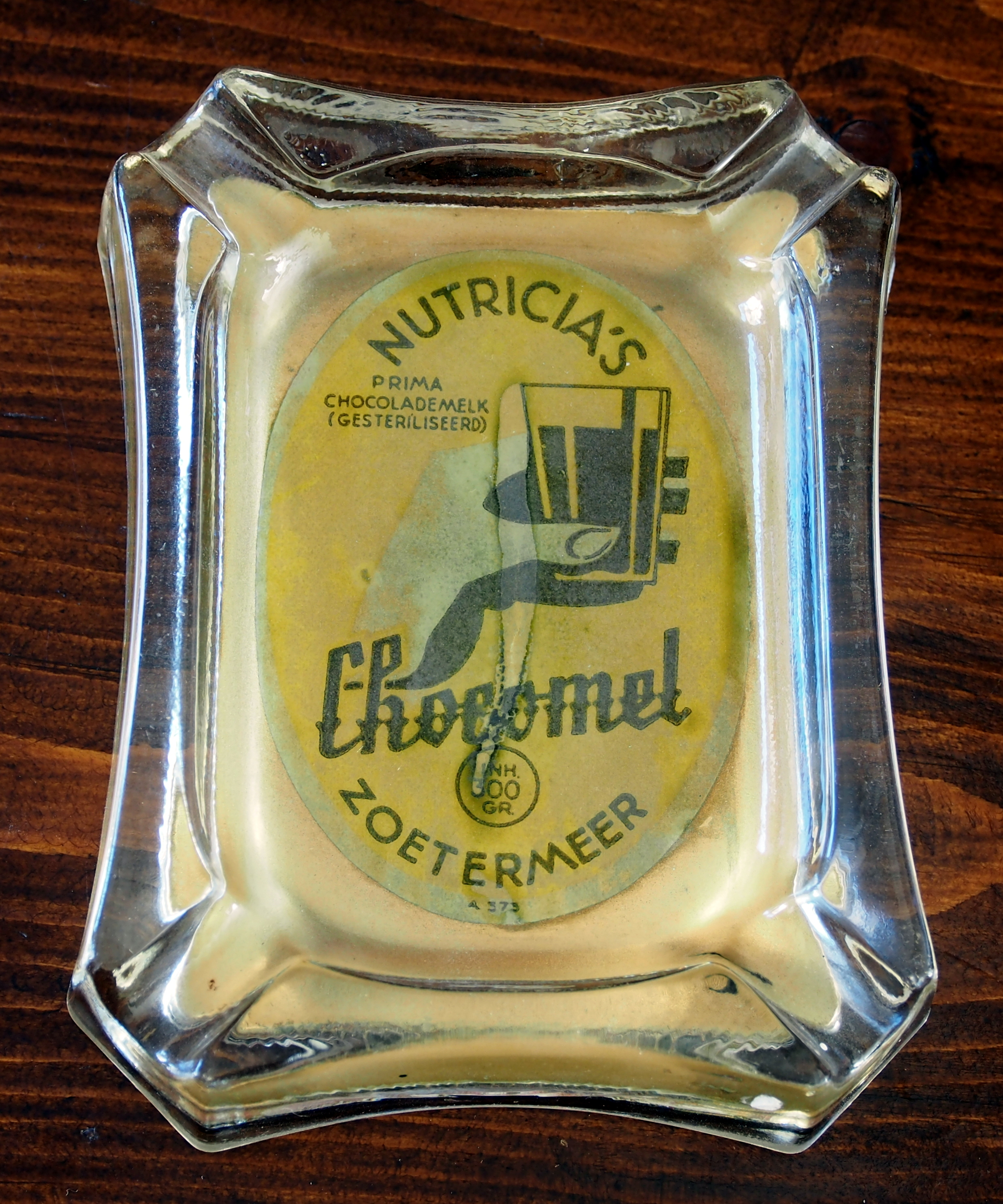
- Formerly: N.V. Nutricia (1896–1998); Royal Numico N.V. (1998–2009)
- Type: Private (1896–2007)
- Industry: Healthcare
- Founded: 1896; 130 years ago in the Netherlands
- Founder: Martinus van der Hagen; Jan van der Hagen
- Fate: Acquired by Danone in 2007, which took over the "Nutricia" brand.
- Headquarters: Netherlands
- Products: Therapeutic food
- Brands: Nutricia
- Owner: Danone
- Website: nutricia.com

Nutricia is a Danone brand that specialises in therapeutic food and infant formula, including medical nutrition for babies with specific needs.

The former company, N.V. Nutricia., was established in The Netherlands by brothers Jan and Martinus van der Hagen, who started the production of infant milk formula in 1896 and diabetic milk products and iodine enriched milks in 1905.

== History ==
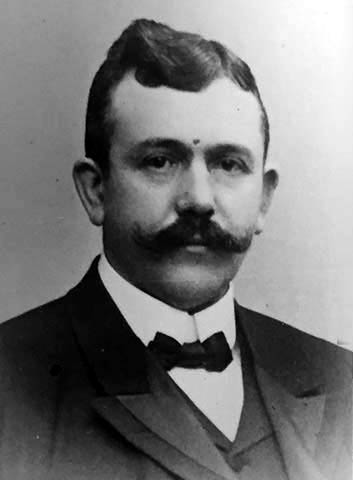
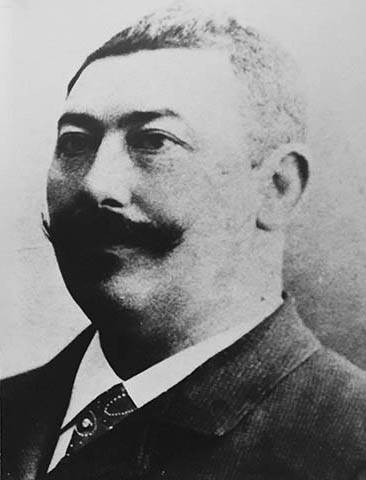
Jan and Martinus van der Hagen, founders of Nutricia

In 1885, the German professor Alexander Backhaus developed a technique in his laboratory that removed the more slowly digested casein protein from cow’s milk, leaving behind only the faster dissolving and more easily digestible whey proteins. Backhaus’ new formulation was better tolerated and closer in composition to human milk. Since the composition of cow’s milk was not appropriate for feeding infants and could, at that time, be a source of disease contributing to high infant mortality across Europe.

Backhaus filed a patent and presented his invention at a medical conference in Berlin in 1896 where Johannes van der Hagen, a medical doctor, and Dutch Public Health Inspector, was in the audience. Johannes introduced Backhaus to his brother, Martinus van der Hagen, who owned a factory in The Netherlands producing margarine and dairy products. Backhaus granted them rights to manufacture his infant milk formula.

In 1901, the "Nutricia" name was adopted and became known as “The Wet Nurse of The Netherlands.” Five years later, Nutricia began to introduce new special diet products such as low-sugar milk for diabetic patients and iodine-rich milk for those suffering from goitre, marking the beginnings of 'medical nutrition' as a category.

In 1924, Nutricia moved its main (powder) production facilities (from van der Hagen's original factory) to the N.V. Cuijk's Dairy Factory. For almost 100 years, this factory has been producing specialized nutritional solutions for infants and young children with special dietary needs. In 1946 Nutricia sets up its first research facilities in Zoetermeer, The Netherlands.

In 1950, Nutricia introduced ‘Voedingsnieuws’ ‘Nutrition News’, a group of dieticians who travelled around The Netherlands and to other countries, educating healthcare professionals on the role of specialized nutrition.

In 1986 Nutricia opened a consumer Care Line, managed by qualified dieticians helping consumers, carers and healthcare professionals. The company changed its name to "Koninklijke Numico N.V.", or "Royal Numico N.V.", in 1998.

In 2007, French conglomerate Danone acquired Royal Numico for €12.3 billion, after the Numico board accepted the offer. Danone announced ownership of over 90% of Numico's shares on 31 October 2007, declaring its offer for the remainder unconditional. As a result, Numico was removed from the AEX index. The company's shares were delisted from the Amsterdam Stock Exchange at the end of 2007 as Danone gained full control. The brands owned by Numico -Nutricia, Milupa (part of Nutricia since 1995) and Cow & Gate (part of Nutricia since 1981) became part of Danone and is currently named Danone Baby and Medical Nutrition B.V..

== See also ==
- Anikspray
