= Together for Sustainability =

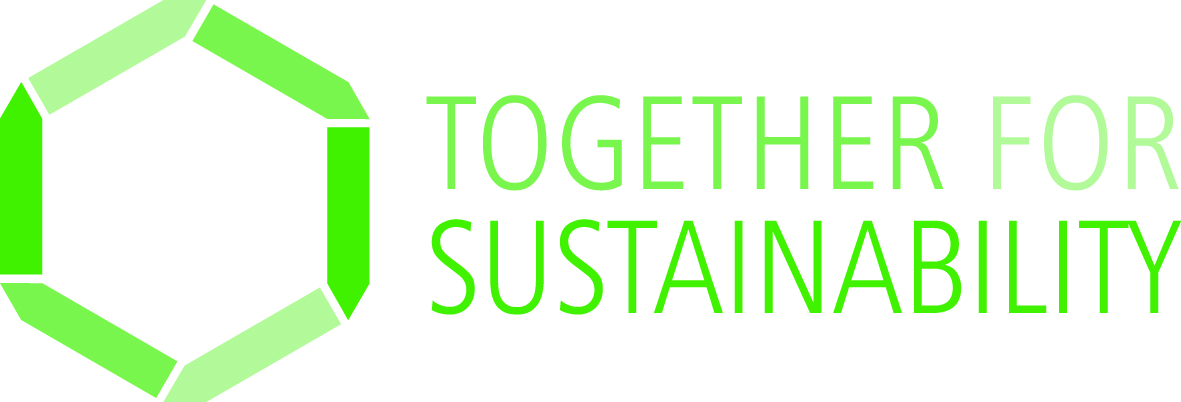
- Type: Membership organization
- Industry: Chemical Industry
- Founded: 2011; 15 years ago
- Headquarters: Brussels, Belgium
- Key people: Rüdiger Eberhard (President (2015-2019); Bertrand Conquéret (President (2019-2023); Jennifer Jewson (President (2023-20..); Gabriele Unger (General Manager)
- Website: https://tfs-initiative.com/

Together for Sustainability AISBL (TfS) is a joint initiative of chemical companies, founded in 2011. It focuses on the promotion of sustainable practices in the chemical industry supply chain, currently gathering chemical companies around a single standard of auditing and assessment.

== Sustainability in chemical supply chains ==
Over the past few years sustainability aspects in the chemical industry have become more important and holistic. Nowadays, chemical companies' measures focusing on sustainability include ecological aspects, social concerns and collaborative issues.

Today, it has been well accepted that the creation of sustainable chemical supply chains requires a joint effort beyond individual businesses. These efforts should integrate chemical companies, suppliers, customers as well as consumers.

Prof. Dr Wolfgang Stolze and Marc Müller of the University of St. Gallen summarize the development in the chemical industry in recent years as follows: "The scope of sustainability in the chemical industry has evolved from a firm-level construct with a strong focus on green aspects to a chain-level approach attempting to address the triple bottom line of economic, social and environmental elements."

== History ==
The Together for Sustainability initiative was founded in 2011 by BASF, Bayer, Evonik, Henkel, Lanxess, and Solvay. The objective was to develop a global supplier engagement program and improve their own sustainability sourcing practices in line with the United Nations Global Compact. Since January 2015, the TfS initiative is incorporated as an international non-profit association under Belgian law.

Since June 2012, TfS conducts assessments and audits by independent experts, as well as the early partnership with the French company EcoVadis, which provided with sustainability scorecards and benchmarks.

In June 2023, Jennifer Jewson, CPO of LyondellBasell, was elected as president of the TfS. She was re-elected as TfS President in 2025 for a second term of 2 years.

== Structure ==
The TfS is governed by two main organs, the General Assembly and the Steering Committee. The General Assembly is formed by all the Chief Procurement Officers of the member companies, and holds power over the direction and structure of the organization, as well as approving the decisions of the Steering Committee. The Steering Committee, formed by six elected members of the General Assembly as well as the TfS president, is the executive council of the organization and decides upon its activities and projects.

Additionally, TfS has several Regional Operating Committees (Asia, North America and South America) as well as, currently, five mission-specific work streams led and staffed by participants from the TfS member companies:

- Work Stream 1: Governance and Partnerships
- Work Stream 2: TfS Assessments
- Work Stream 3: TfS Audits
- Work Stream 4: TfS Communications and Capability Building
- Work Stream 5: Scope 3 GHG Emissions

TfS' headquarter is in Brussels. It manages the day-to-day affairs of the organization and stays in close contact with the representatives and coordinators of the member companies.

TfS has a partnership with several other chemical industry associations: American Chemistry Council (ACC), European Chemical Industry Council (CEFIC), German Chemistry Council (VCI), China Petroleum and Chemical Industry Federation (CPCIF), Indian Chemical Council (ICC), and the Associação Brasileira da Indústria Química (ABIQUIM).

== Members ==
TfS Membership is open to all companies in the chemical industry who subscribe to the United Nations Global Compact, Responsible Care, and show a commitment to sustainability. TfS membership has been growing steadily since its founding, and in April 2022 its members have a joint global turnover of over €500 billion.

As of July 2026, TfS has 64 member companies.

Company	Headquarters	Year of membership
Advansix	Parsippany, New Jersey	2021
AkzoNobel	Amsterdam, Netherlands	2013
Allnex	Frankfurt, Germany	2022
Altana	Wesel, Germany	2024
Archroma	Reinach, Switzerland	2021
Arkema	Colombes, France	2014
Arxada	Basel, Switzerland	2026
Azelis	Antwerp, Belgium	2020
BASF	Ludwigshafen, Germany	2011
Bayer	Leverkusen, Germany	2011
Brenntag	Essen, Germany	2017
CABB	Sulzbach am Taunus, Germany	2022
Caldic BV Group	Rotterdam, The Netherlands	2025
Celanese	Irving, Texas, United States	2025
Chemours	Wilmington, Delaware	2021
Clariant	Muttenz, Switzerland	2014
Covestro	Leverkusen, Germany	2015
Croda	Snaith, United Kingdom	2021
Dow	Midland, United States	2021
DSM-Firmenich	Heerlen, Netherlands	2015
Eastman	Kingsport, Tennessee, United States	2015
Eternis Fine Chemicals Limited	Mumbai, India	2025
Evonik	Essen, Germany	2011
Givaudan	Vernier, Switzerland	2021
HA Group	Düsseldorf, Germany	2023
Hempel Group	Lyngby, Denmark	2025
Henkel	Düsseldorf, Germany	2011
ICL	Tel-Aviv, Israel	2018
IFF	New York City, United States	2015
IMCD	Rotterdam, Netherlands	2022
Indorama	Bangkok, Thailand	2023
Jiahua Chemicals Inc.	Fushun, China	2026
Johnson Matthey	London, United Kingdom	2023
Kraton	Houston, United States	2020
Lanxess	Cologne, Germany	2011
Lenzing AG	Lenzing, Austria	2022
Lonza	Basel, Switzerland	2022
LyondellBasell	Houston, Texas	2021
Merck	Darmstadt, Germany	2014
Mitsui & Co.	Japan, Tokyo	2022
Momentive Performance Materials	Niskayuna, United States	2023
Nouryon	Houston, United States	2023
Novonesis	Bagsværd, Denmark	2025
OMV	Vienna, Austria	2021
P&G	Cincinnati, United States	2025
PPG Industries	Pittsburg, United States	2026
Sabic	Riyadh, Saudi Arabia	2023
Semperit	Vienna, Austria	2021
Sennics	Shanghai, China	2022
Sika	Baar, Switzerland	2020
Solvay	Brussels, Belgium	2011
Surventis	Münster, Germany	2026
Suzhou Hechuang Chemical Co. Ltd	Changshu, China	2026
Syensqo	Brussels, Belgium	2024
Symrise	Holzminden, Germany	2024
Syngenta	Basel, Switzerland	2015
Synthomer	London, United Kingdom	2023
Takasago International Corporation	Ota-ku, Japan	2026
Tricon	Houston, United States	2023
Univar Solutions	Downers Grove, United States	2024
UPM	Helsinki, Finland	2018
Wacker	Munich, Germany	2015
Wanhua	Yantai, China	2019
Yara	Oslo, Norway	2023

== Recognition ==
- 2015 - Highly Commended at the Ethical Corporation Responsible Business Award 2015
- 2016 - Sustainable Purchasing Leadership Council Market Transformation Award
- 2018 - Best Third Sector/Not-for-profit Procurement Project at CIPS Supply Management Awards
- 2018 - Finalist for international Responsible Business Awards

== See also ==
- ISO 26000
- Corporate social responsibility
- United Nations Global Compact
- Sustainable Stock Exchanges Initiative
