= International Council of Chemical Associations =

International trade association for the chemical industry

- Abbreviation: ICCA
- Formation: 1989; 37 years ago
- Legal status: Trade association
- Region served: Worldwide
- Members: 12
- Official language: English
- Website: www.icca-chem.org

The International Council of Chemical Associations (ICCA) is the trade association of the global chemical industry. Its members are both regional trade associations like Cefic or the Gulf Petrochemicals and Chemicals Association, and also national associations including the American Chemistry Council.

According to its own figures, ICCA represents chemical companies which account for more than 75% of the global production capacities, making more than US$1.6 trillion in revenues each year.

ICCA is the steward of Responsible Care, a voluntary scheme to improve chemical safety among its members. Responsible Care had been launched by the Chemistry Industry Association of Canada in 1985. At the 2006 International Conference on Chemicals Management, Responsible Care was extended through a Global Product Strategy and a Global Charter.

== Membership ==
Full members of ICCA include:

Association	Region/Country
American Chemistry Council (ACC)	USA
Brazilian Chemical Industry Association (ABIQUIM)	Brazil
Chemical and Allied Industries’ Association (CAIA)	South Africa
Chemistry Australia	Australia
Chemistry Industry Association of Canada (CIAC)	Canada
European Chemical Industry Council (Cefic)	Europe
Gulf Petrochemicals and Chemicals Association (GPCA)	Persian Gulf
Japan Chemical Industry Association (JCIA)	Japan
Korea Chemical Industry Council (KOCIC)	Korea
Mexican Chemical Industry Association (ANIQ)	Mexico
Responsible Care New Zealand (RCNZ)	New Zealand
Singapore Chemical Industry Council (SCIC)	Singapore

== See also ==
- European Chemical Industry Council
