= American Chemistry Council =

U.S. industrial trade association

- Logo of the American Chemistry Council
- Abbreviation: ACC
- Formation: 1872; 154 years ago
- Purpose: Trade association
- Headquarters: Washington, D.C., U.S.
- President and CEO: Chris Jahn
- Website: www.americanchemistry.com
- Formerly called: Manufacturing Chemists' Association, Chemical Manufacturers' Association

The American Chemistry Council (ACC), known as the Manufacturing Chemists' Association at its founding in 1872 then as the Chemical Manufacturers' Association (from 1978 until 2000), is an industry trade association for American chemical companies, based in Washington, D.C.

== Activities ==
The mission of the American Chemistry Council is to promote the interests of corporations of the chemical industry. The trade group represents U.S. chemical companies as well as the plastics and chlorine industries, formerly known as the American Plastics Council, the Center for the Polyurethanes Industry and the Chlorine Chemistry Council.

ACC implemented the Responsible Care program in 1988. At least 52 countries have implemented this initiative. It is managed at a global level by the International Council of Chemical Associations. Participation in the program is a mandatory for all ACC members.

It has a political action committee that gives money to members of the Congress of the United States.

ACC launched a $35 million "essential2" public relations campaign in 2005. The "essential2" campaign attempted to improve the industry's image by emphasizing the importance of chemical industry products – especially plastics – to everyday life, and by using the term "American Chemistry" rather than "chemical industry". ACC later shifted to a more directed lobbying and policy-shaping effort, including taking legal action against federal efforts to regulate greenhouse gas emissions from industry.

Sometime in 2008, ACC launched a campaign to oppose California SB1713 – a bill to ban bisphenol A statewide – including bulk postal mailings in July and August encouraging California citizens to demand opposition of their representing legislators.

In 2011, it was a major sponsor of the 5th International Marine Debris Conference which endorsed the Honolulu Commitment to reduce harmful plastics in the environment.

The ACC stepped in during 2023 to prohibit the passage of the Packaging Reduction & Recycling Act in New York state, spending a total $120,000 on two lobbying firms, Greenberg Traurig and Craig Johnson’s Long Point Advisors, to work on its behalf for the duration of the legislative session.

=== Influence in the Donald Trump administration ===
The ACC has been successful in staffing the second Donald Trump administration with its own staff, such as Nancy Beck and Lynn Ann Dekleva who took senior positions in the Environmental Protection Agency. In the second Trump administration, they pushed to deregulate chemicals that other EPA staff and scientists had raised health and environment concerns about. Beck was also in a similar position in the first Trump administration where she was "credited with leading a wide-ranging pushback against chemical regulations." In the EPA, Beck sought to scale back proposed bans on asbestos and methylene chloride. She also rewrote rules to make it harder to track PFAS ("forever chemicals").

== Criticism ==
The Responsible Care (RC) program has been described as a way to help the industry avoid regulation by imposing its own safety and environmental regulations and to improve its public image in the wake of the 1984 Bhopal disaster. According to a 2000 study, plants owned by RC participating firms improved their relative environmental performance more slowly than non members. The study highlighted the RC program as an example of how industries fail to self-regulate without explicit sanctions. According to a 2013 study, between 1988 and 2001, plants owned by RC participating firms raised their toxicity-weighted pollution by 15.9% on average relative to statistically-equivalent plants owned by non-RC participating firms.

Environmentalists and those concerned about the health effects of chemicals in the environment traditionally oppose ACC's initiatives. They view campaigns like "essential2" as efforts to distract public attention away from products and practices that they view as harmful and dangerous.

The American Chemistry Council's stance on chemical regulation was heavily criticized in the 2015 documentary Stink! available on Netflix.

== Fighting plastic bag regulation ==
ACC has engaged repeatedly in fighting governmental restrictions and bans on plastic shopping bags. The phase-out of lightweight plastic bags has been proposed or implemented in many countries since 2002. In the United States, in July 2008, the Seattle City Council voted to impose an additional 20 cent fee on each plastic bag purchased from stores by shoppers as a convenience for transportation of goods. This effort was suspended until a referendum could be held in 2009, allowing voters a chance to weigh in on the issue of whether they should continue to be encouraged to support industry by purchasing plastic bags without considering disposal costs. During the period leading up to the referendum vote the American Chemistry Council stepped into this local affair, ultimately spending some $1.4 million on their successful effort to thwart the proposed system of fully accounting for the cost of plastic bags. Seattle in 2012 overcame ACC objections and successfully enacted a bag ban.

In 2010, ACC was quoted by The New York Times in opposition to a California bill to outlaw plastic bags, claiming that new law "amounts to a $1 billion tax added to [Californian's] grocery bills."

But subsequent ACC efforts to prevent adoption of municipal ordinances banning plastic bags have not been successful. Over ACC opposition, San Jose, California, in 2010 adopted California's strictest ban. The ordinance, in effect since 2012, prohibits supermarkets, pharmacies, corner shops and others from distributing single-use plastic bags, with fines for violations. Retailers can sell paper bags made of 40 percent recycled materials for 10 cents each, gradually increasing to 25 cents by 2014. In 2016, California voters approved a statewide ban on carry-out plastic bags.

== See also ==
- American Council on Science and Health
- American Chemical Society
