= Gulf Petrochemicals and Chemicals Association =

GPCA logo

The Gulf Petrochemicals and Chemicals Association (GPCA) represents the downstream hydrocarbon industry in the Arab states of the Persian Gulf. According to its 2024 annual report, the association represented 247 member companies and the regional chemical industry produced over US$108 billion worth of products annually. Established in 2006, the association voices the common interests of more than 230 member companies from the chemical and allied industries, accounting for over 95% of chemical output in the Persian Gulf region. The industry makes up the second largest manufacturing sector in the region, producing up to US$97.3 billion worth of products a year.

The association supports the region's petrochemical and chemical industry through advocacy, networking and thought leadership initiatives.

The GPCA manages six working committees – Plastics, Supply Chain, Fertilizers, International Trade, Research and Innovation, and Responsible Care – and organizes six conferences each year. The association also publishes an annual report, regular newsletters and reports.

The Chairman of Gulf Petrochemicals and Chemicals Association (GPCA) is Yousef Al-Benyan, Vice Chairman & CEO SABIC.
