= Clariant =

Swiss specialty chemicals company

Clariant AG
- Company type: Public
- Traded as: SIX: CLN
- Industry: Chemicals
- Founded: 1995; 31 years ago
- Headquarters: Muttenz (Basel-Landschaft), Switzerland
- Area served: Worldwide
- Key people: Ben van Beurden (Chairman); Conrad Keijzer (CEO); Oliver Rittgen (CFO); Christian Vang (Business President Care Chemicals and Americas); Angela Cackovich (Business President Adsorbents & Additives and EMEA); Jens Cuntze (Business President Catalysts and APAC
- Products: Speciality chemicals
- Revenue: ▼SFr 3.915 billion (2025)
- Operating income: ▼SFr 362 million (2025)
- Net income: ▼SFr -41 million (2025)
- Total assets: ▼SFr 5.871 billion (2025)
- Total equity: ▼SFr 2.182 billion (2025)
- Number of employees: 10281 (end 2025)
- Divisions: Care Chemicals; Catalysts; Adsorbents & Additives
- Website: clariant.com

Clariant AG is a Swiss multinational speciality chemical company, formed in 1995 as a spin-off from Sandoz. Headquartered in Muttenz, Switzerland, the public company encompasses 68 subsidiaries in 36 countries (2023). Major manufacturing sites are located in Europe, North America, South America, China, and India. In 2025, sales from continuing operations were 3.915 billion CHF.

European and Middle East markets accounted for 42%, Asia-Pacific for 29%, North America and Latin America for 29% of sales in 2025. EBITDA in 2025 was 643 million CHF. Headquarters are officially in Muttenz, but most global functions are officed in a dedicated corporate center in nearby Pratteln, both near Basel, Switzerland. Clariant's three business units are: Care Chemicals (sales of 2112 million CHF in 2025), Adsorbents & Additives (sales of 987 million CHF in 2025) and Catalysts (sales of 816 million CHF in 2025).

Conrad Keijzer has been Clariant's CEO since 1 January 2021.

== Business history ==
The company started in 1995, as a spinoff (IPO) of the chemical operations of Sandoz, which then merged its pharmaceutical business with that of Ciba-Geigy to form Novartis. (Ciba-Geigy also went on to spin out its chemical operations, called Ciba Specialty Chemicals, which was later acquired by BASF.) In 1997, Clariant grew substantially, with the acquisition of the Hoechst speciality chemicals business.

In 2000, Clariant bought British Tar Products (BTP plc), in 2006 Clariant bought Ciba's Masterbatches division, and in 2011 Clariant acquired German speciality chemical company Süd-Chemie. In 2013, Clariant divested its textile chemicals, emulsions and paper specialities businesses to SK Capital. In 2014, Clariant divested its leather services to Stahl Holdings and its detergents & intermediates business to Weylchem of the International Chemical Investors Group. In 2016, Clariant partnered with matchmycolor LLC, a colour know-how company and Konica Minolta Inc, a Japanese technology company to efficiently colour match the polyolefin products easier and faster. In the same year, Clariant acquired Kel-Tech and X-Chem in the U.S.

In May 2017, Clariant and Huntsman Corporation announced that they would merge, as equals, forming HuntsmanClariant which would be the global leader in specialty chemical production - with the deal valued at $20 billion. Clariant shareholders will own 52% of the new entity, with Huntsman shareholders owning the remaining 48% of shares.

In October 2017, the merger between Clariant and Huntsman Corporation was halted due to concerns that a two-thirds shareholder approval, required by Swiss law, could not be reached. The all stock transaction would not have found support by White Tale Holdings, which continues to accumulate stocks while opposing the consolidation.

On 25 January 2018, White Tale Holdings, which is a partnership between hedge fund Corvex Management LP and investment group 40 North, ended its hostility and sold 25% of its stake to SABIC despite previous assertions that it was a long term holder. Clariant and SABIC subsequently signed a memorandum and a governance agreement.

In 2019, Clariant divested its Healthcare Packaging business to Arsenal Capital Partners. One year later, Clariant completed the sale of its entire Masterbatches business to PolyOne (rebranding to the name Avient in the same year). Two years later, in 2022, Clariant sold its Pigments business to a consortium of Heubach Group and SK Capital Partners. Clariant reinvested to retain a 20% stake in the new holding company.

In 2021, Clariant and India Glycols Limited (IGL) announced the successful creation of their 51-49% joint venture for renewable ethylene oxide (EO) derivatives after receiving all necessary regulatory approvals. The joint venture operates under the name Clariant IGL Specialty Chemicals Private Limited (CISC). In the same year, Clariant acquired the remaining 70% in Beraca, a Brazilian manufacturer of natural ingredients for the personal care sector. Clariant has held a 30% stake in the company since 2015.

On 23 November 2021, Clariant unveiled a new purpose-led strategy with four dimensions based on its purpose, »Greater chemistry – between people and planet«, accompanied by new financial and non-financial targets.

On 14 February 2022, Clariant delayed the release of its 2021 annual report and postponed the annual general meeting of shareholders, after saying the company is investigating allegations by internal whistleblowers that staff manipulated accounts to meet financial targets. On 27 April 2022, Clariant announced the conclusion of the investigation conducted by independent advisors and external counsel. The results of the investigation had no impact on the sales, cash and cash equivalents figures reported in 2020 and 2021.

In October 2022, Clariant acquired BASF’s U.S. Attapulgite business assets for USD 60 million in cash.

In April 2024, Clariant acquired Lucas Meyer Cosmetics from International Flavors & Fragrances for $810 million.

== Business units and business segments ==
In 2022, Clariant announced a simplified organizational and leadership structure and reorganized its business in three global business units instead of five, with newly appointed Business Presidents. Clariant combined its existing business unit Catalysts and business line Biofuels & Derivatives into one single business unit called “Catalysts”, Functional Minerals and Additives into “Adsorbents & Additives”, and Industrial and Consumer Specialties and Oil and Mining Services into “Care Chemicals”.

The business unit Care Chemicals consists of the business segments Personal & Home Care, Crop Solutions, Industrial Applications, Base Chemicals, Oil Services and Mining Solutions. The business unit Catalysts includes the business segments Propylene, Specialties, Syngas & Fuels, Ethylene, Biofuels & Derivatives and Applied Catalyst Technology. The business unit Adsorbents & Additives comprises the business segments Purification, Foundry & Specialties, and Cargo & Device Protection in the regions EMEA, APAC and Americas on the Adsorbents side, as well as Coatings & Adhesives, Plastics and E-Mobility & Electronics in Additives.

== Sustainability ==
Clariant is a constituent of the FTSE4Good Index and is a member of Together for Sustainability, EcoCircle, the Alliance to End Plastic Waste and the Renewable Carbon Initiative.

For 16 years, Clariant’s reporting has been based on the Global Reporting Initiative (GRI). Since 2013, Clariant has committed to the United Nations Global Compacts and reports annually on its contribution to the 10 principles. Additionally, the company publishes information on climate risks in line with the Task Force on Climate-related Financial Disclosures (TCFD). Clariant also reports in accordance with the guidelines of the Sustainability Accounting Standards Board (SASB).

Clariant's innovations have received several awards. In 2022, these achievements include the ACC Sustainable Leadership award, several BSB Innovation Awards, the ICIS Innovation Award, but also the Sustainable Packaging Award for the Personal Care packaging concept "Design4Circularity" that resulted from an industry collaboration with Siegwerk, Borealis, and Beiersdorf.

In 2022, 77% of the product portfolio were screened based on 36 sustainability criteria and 89% of raw material spend were covered by sustainability assessments.

== See also ==
- List of specialty chemical companies
