= Association of European Manufacturers of Sporting Ammunition =

European nonprofit organization

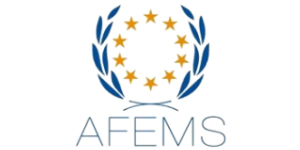
- Formation: 1951
- Type: NGO
- Legal status: Association
- Location: Rome, Italy
- Region served: Europe
- Members: 23 countries
- Official language: English
- Main organ: General Assembly
- Website: http://www.afems.org/

AFEMS (Association des Fabricant Européen de Munitions de Sport;) – a non-profitable organisation that based on collaboration and dialogue, creates forums; for its company members, share information about sporting ammunition. Main goal of the association is quickly and accurately react on scientific, technical and legislative problems in sporting ammunition area.

== Common goal ==
AFEMS mission is to protect and grow activities related to sporting ammunition, support shooting sport and prevent environmental pollution. AFEMS share the common goal to research the problem related to the sporting firearms and ammo Industry, their components and the production material, from a scientific, technical, safety, regulatory and institutional point of view, and establish a dialogue between the Industry, the actors of other sectors and international and European bodies.

== History ==
AFEMS was founded in 1951 as resumption of IAC (International Ammunition Convention) works that started in 1898. Association of European Manufacturers of Sporting Ammunition is a wide-Europe organisation and nowadays consists of 52 partner companies and 8 filiations from 23 European countries.

== Structure ==
- General Assembly
- President
- Board of Directors
- Secretary General

== AFEMS Committees ==
- Strategic
- Technical
- Legislative

== AFEMS Network ==
AFEMS is Member of the European Shooting Sport Forum (ESSF), a European informal platform that integrates the common interests of different Associations related to the firearms and ammunition industry, like civilian firearms producers and distributors, hunting, sport shooters, and collectors.

AFEMS is also Member of the World Forum on Shooting Activities (WFSA), an international platform bringing together more than 50 associations, experts and independent bodies from all over the world. It is a UN ECOSOC NGO in Special Consultative Status, which scope is to cooperate and to exchange information relevant to follow the legislation and its implementation at international, regional and national level.

In addition, AFEMS is affiliated to CEFIC, the European Chemical Industry Council, which includes the most important European chemical Companies.

Since 2016 AFEMS is an NGO in Special Consultative Status with the Economic and Social Council of the United Nations.

== Goals ==
AFEMS goals are to:

- collect and exchange information on scientific and technical, institutional and environmental and standardisation issues concerning sporting ammo and related industries
- take part to working and experts groups at both European and international level, to provide expertise and suggest solutions;
- cooperate with the European Bodies during the Directive preparative phases, by providing concrete information and statistics;
- submit papers to the European Bodies representing the ammunition industry's position;
- monitor the work of the UNECE Working and Expert Groups on the (Transport of Dangerous Goods);
- work with CEN (European Committee for Standardization) and ISO (International Organization for Standardization) to draft standards to regulate the sporting ammunition sector;
- set up and support working relations with the main European NGOs involved in the protection and development of the hunting and sport shooting sector;
- encourage compatibility between the industry's requirements and the expectations of environmental protection bodies;
- promote mutual respect, dialogue and shared goals between the hunting and sport shooting society, decision-making bodies and public at large, to improve the quality of life and to maximise economic benefits.

== Events ==
- On July 3, 2013, in Bologna, was held a conference entitled "The lead in ammunition: new scientific evidence for sustainable solutions."
- A significant International Symposium was organized in Brussels on 20 October 2015 by the Association of European Manufacturers of Sporting Ammunition (AFEMS) and the World Forum on Shooting Activities (WFSA). The Symposium focused on the sustainable use of lead in ammunition and its impact on both the environment and human health. The purpose of the meeting was to inform and educate decision makers in Europe of the facts surrounding lead ammunition, to balance the argument made by certain ‘conservation’ charities and to highlight the pitfalls of any restrictive legislation.
