= United Nations Industrial Development Organization =

Specialized agency of the United Nations

- Abbreviation: UNIDO
- Formation: 17 November 1966; 60 years ago
- Type: United Nations specialized agency
- Legal status: Active
- Headquarters: Vienna, Austria
- Head: Director-General; Gerd Müller
- Parent organization: United Nations Economic and Social Council
- Website: www.unido.org

The United Nations Industrial Development Organization (UNIDO) (French: Organisation des Nations unies pour le développement industriel; ONUDI) is a specialized agency of the United Nations (UN) that assists countries in economic and industrial development. It is headquartered at the UN Office in Vienna, Austria, with a permanent presence in over 60 countries. UNIDO comprises 173 member states, which together set the organization's policies, programs, and principles through the biannual General Conference.

UNIDO was established in 1966 by the UN General Assembly to promote and accelerate the industrialization of developing countries, which were emerging from decolonization in record numbers and with little to no industrial base. In 1979 it became one of the 15 specialized agencies of the UN, with its new constitution coming into force in 1985. Since its founding, the organization has restructured and reformed several times; the 2013 Lima Declaration expanded its mission to include promoting "inclusive and sustainable industrial development" (ISID), defined as benefiting greater numbers of people while safeguarding the environment. (Note: There were two Lima Declarations regarding UNIDO: the first was the 1975 Lima Declaration and Plan of Action on Industrial Development and Co-operation, and the second was the "new" Lima Declaration, Towards Inclusive and Sustainable Industrial Development of 2013) UNIDO is a member of the United Nations Development Group, a coalition of UN entities aimed at fulfilling the Sustainable Development Goals.

On 25 July 2016, the United Nations General Assembly adopted Resolution A/RES/70/293, proclaiming the period 2016–2025 as the Third Industrial Development Decade for Africa (IDDA III). UNIDO was called upon to lead the initiative in collaboration with a range of partners. These include the African Union Commission, the New Partnership for Africa's Development, the Economic Commission for Africa, etc.

From 2018 to 2021, UNIDO's strategic priorities include creating shared prosperity; advancing economic competitiveness; safeguarding the environment; and strengthening knowledge and institutions. Each of these goals is to be achieved through technical cooperation, policy advice, analysis and research, the development of uniform standards and quality control, and partnerships for knowledge transfer, networking and industrial cooperation.

UNIDO employs some 670 staff and draws on the services of some 2,800 international and national experts—approximately half from developing countries—annually, who work in project assignments throughout the world.

== Overview ==
The relevance of ISID as an integrated approach to all three pillars of sustainable development is recognized by the 2030 Agenda for Sustainable Development and the related Sustainable Development Goals (SDGs), which will frame United Nations and country efforts towards sustainable development in the next fifteen years. UNIDO's mandate is fully recognized in SDG-9, which calls to "Build resilient infrastructure, promote inclusive and sustainable industrialization and foster innovation". The relevance of ISID, however, applies in greater or lesser extent to all SDGs.

Accordingly, the Organization's programmatic focus is structured, as detailed in the Organization's Medium-Term Programme Framework 2018–2021, in four strategic priorities:

- Creating shared prosperity;
- Advancing economic competitiveness;
- Safeguarding the environment;
- Strengthening knowledge and institutions.

Each of these programmatic fields of activity contains a number of individual programmes, which are implemented in a holistic manner to achieve effective outcomes and impacts through UNIDO's four enabling functions:

- Technical cooperation;
- Analytical and research functions and policy advisory services;
- Normative functions and standards and quality-related activities;
- Convening and partnerships for knowledge transfer, networking and industrial cooperation.

In carrying out the core requirements of its mission, UNIDO has considerably increased its technical services over the past ten years. At the same time, it has also substantially increased its mobilization of financial resources, testifying to the growing international recognition of the Organization as an effective provider of catalytic industrial development services.

UNIDO was established as a UN programme in 1966 with headquarters in Vienna, Austria, and became a specialized agency of the United Nations in 1985.

In 2004, UNIDO established the UNIDO Goodwill Ambassador programme.

In 2009, UNIDO created a new flagship publication, Making It: Industry for Development.

== Executive heads ==
UNIDO Executive Directors
1967–1974	Ibrahim Helmi Abd-elRahman ( Egypt)
1975–1985	Abd-El Rahman Khane ( Algeria)
UNIDO Director-Generals
1985–1992	Domingo L. Siazon Jr. ( Philippines)
1993–1997	Mauricio de Maria y Campos ( Mexico)
1998–2005	Carlos Alfredo Magariños ( Argentina)
2006 – June 2013	Kandeh Yumkella ( Sierra Leone)
July 2013 – November 2021	Li Yong (李勇) ( China)
December 2021 –	Gerd Müller ( Germany)

== Facts and figures ==
UNIDO's headquarters are located at the Vienna International Centre, the UN campus that also hosts the International Atomic Energy Agency, the United Nations Office on Drugs and Crime and the Preparatory Commission for the Comprehensive Test Ban Treaty Organization, among others.

== Strategic priorities ==
=== Creating shared prosperity ===
UNIDO concentrates its efforts on the development of agro-industries, increasing the participation of women and youth in productive activities, and human security in post-crisis situations. The Organization's services for the development of agro-industries focus on adding value to agricultural production by strengthening linkages between agriculture, industry and markets.

UNIDO supports the transformation of enterprises from the informal sector to the formal sector, with a special focus on simplifying and improving access to administrative company registration services. It also strives to improve women's participation in entrepreneurial activities. Based on its experience in post-crisis and human security programmes and projects, UNIDO responds to complex emergencies through activities that contribute to socio-economic as well as environmental and energy security both at national and local level.

=== Advancing economic competitiveness ===
UNIDO supports programmes towards investment and technology promotion, SME development, trade capacity building, and entrepreneurship development.

UNIDO provides advisory services to improve the business and policy environment for the private sector, assisting with the creation of productive capacities. Its programmes support investment and technology opportunities to help enterprises, especially SMEs, improve productivity and innovation, and achieve systemic competitive advantages. Building on a robust global network aimed at fostering investment, technology and other partnership opportunities, UNIDO seeks to enable SMEs to capitalize on their unique dynamism and flexibility by strengthening synergies among enterprises and with support institutions.

In the context of trade capacity-building programmes, UNIDO strengthens international trade norms and standards by assisting developing countries and transition economies in upgrading production and processing systems to enhance the quality of local products, in particular through the adoption of improved technologies, and help them conform to the standards required by international markets. UNIDO builds capacities in both public and private institutions to formulate trade policies and strategies based on economic and statistical analysis, as well as benchmarking competitive performance at sectoral and product levels and supporting the establishment of trade-related databases such as inventories of technical barriers to trade (TBT), which are designed to expand exports from the industrial sector.

=== Safeguarding the environment ===
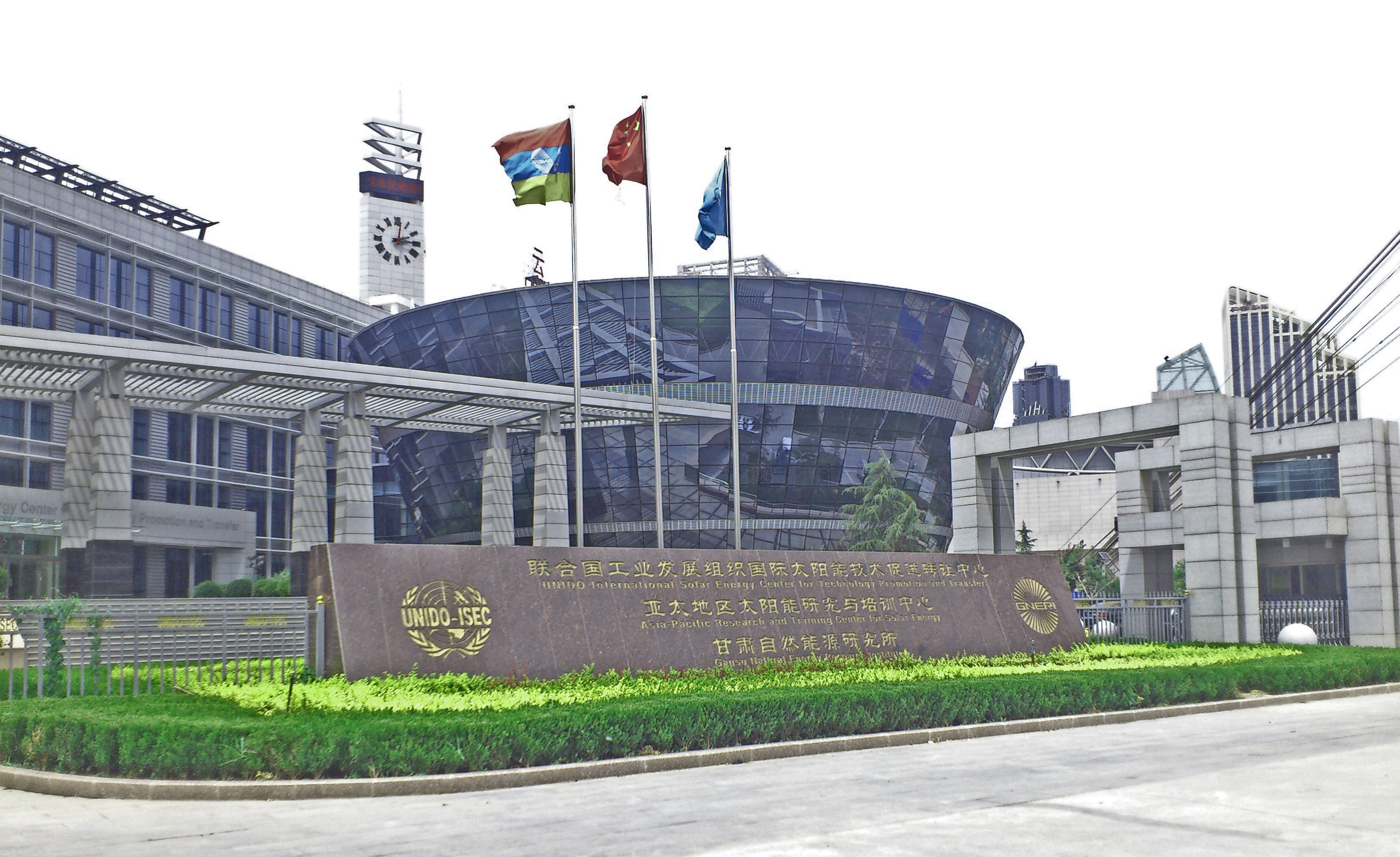
UNIDO-ISEC (International Solar Energy Center) headquarters in Lanzhou, China

UNIDO supports countries in their environmental management efforts, including the implementation of multilateral environmental agreements and the provision of sustainable energy. It helps create new green industries, establishing national road maps for greening the supply chain, determining benchmarks and indicators, disseminating and sharing best practices, running clean technology programmes, undertaking various capacity-building exercises and contributing to international forums with the necessary research and expertise.

The Organization's services include capacity building, direct technical support to enterprises and assistance to government institutions on Cleaner Production (CP) policy matters, as well as the promotion, adaptation and transfer of environmentally sound technologies and the implementation of advanced CP business models, such as chemical leasing.

=== Strengthening knowledge and institutions ===
Strengthening knowledge and institutions is a prioritized outcome that is elevated over other high-level results. It describes the organization's strategic direction towards strengthening the knowledge base for ISID at the project, programme, country and international level, as well as the institutional capacity at the technical, policy and normative level.

== Historical background ==
=== Origins ===
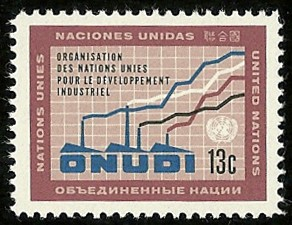
ONUDI in French and Spanish

The origins of the United Nations Industrial Development Organization (UNIDO) can be traced to a series of studies on a programme of rapid industrialization of developing countries that the United Nations Secretariat carried out during the early 1950s at the request of the United Nations Economic and Social Council (ECOSOC). These studies culminated in a programme of work on industrialization and productivity prepared by the United Nations Secretary-General in 1956 and endorsed the next year by ECOSOC and the General Assembly. At that time, it was first suggested that a special body to deal with the problems of industrialization be established, whose political organs could relieve ECOSOC and the General Assembly of the detailed consideration of those questions and whose secretariat could carry out more substantive work than the existing Industry Section of the Bureau of Economic Affairs within the Secretariat. The Industry Section of the Secretariat became a branch in 1959, and in 1962 it became the Industrial Development Centre, headed by a Commissioner for Industrial Development.

=== Special organ of the United Nations ===
In the aftermath, proposals for further institutionalizing industrial development-related issues within the UN were considered by various advisory groups and inter-organizational organs. Subsequently, the United Nations General Assembly created the UNIDO in November 1966 as a special organ of the United Nations. In January 1967, the Organization was formally established with headquarters in Vienna, Austria. Compared to the Industrial Development Centre, UNIDO's creation was intended to broaden the work of its predecessor. Besides normative activities, such as acting as a forum for discussions, analytical functions and information dissemination, UNIDO became involved in operational activities, i.e. in technical co-operation activities.

=== Conversion into a specialized agency ===
The setting up of UNIDO as a special organ had nonetheless been a compromise solution. The developing countries (the Group of 77) had in the first instance promoted the idea of a specialized agency with its own political decision-making governing bodies and autonomy in budgetary matters. The same position was advocated by several high-level expert groups and intergovernmental committees during the following years. In the context of the General Assembly's adoption of the Declaration and Programme of Action on the Establishment of a New International Economic Order and of the Charter of Economic Rights and Duties of States, UNIDO's second General Conference, held in 1975 in Lima, Peru, adopted the Lima Declaration on Industrial Development and Cooperation. For the first time, industrial development objectives were quantified internationally – the Lima Target anticipated the developing countries to attain a twenty-five per cent share of world industrial production by the year of 2000. As part of the institutional arrangements of the Lima Plan of Action, and with a view to assisting in the establishment of a New International Economic Order, it was recommended to the General Assembly that UNIDO be converted into a specialized agency.

An intergovernmental committee prepared a draft constitution, which was adopted in Vienna in 1979. However, the objections and doubts of industrialized countries as to the necessity of a specialized agency contributed to delaying the ratification process. In order to ensure that the new organization would start up with a membership including substantially all significant States, the General Assembly, by resolutions adopted in 1982 and 1984, called for a series of formal consultations among prospective Member States, which eventually led to a general agreement that the new UNIDO Constitution should enter into force. All necessary formal requirements were fulfilled in 1985, and in December of the same year, UNIDO finally became the sixteenth Specialized Agency of the United Nations with headquarters in Vienna.

=== Crisis and reform during the 1990s ===
During the subsequent years, UNIDO continuously expanded particularly its operational activities. However, several developments outside and inside the Organization led to a crisis, which reached a breaking point in 1997 when UNIDO faced the risk of closure: After the end of the Cold War and the triumph of the market economic system over the command economic system, and in view of the Washington Consensus that limited the role of industrial policy in economic development processes, some Member States felt that industrial development could be supported more effectively and efficiently by the private sector. As a result, Canada, the United States (UNIDO's then largest donor), and Australia subsequently withdrew from the Organization between 1993 and 1997. Simultaneously, the continued slowdown in the economies of some major industrialized countries as well as the financial turmoil of the 1997 Asian financial crisis caused multilateral development assistance to decline. In addition, a weak management structure and lack of focus and integration of UNIDO's activities contributed to aggravating the crisis.

UNIDO's Member States responded by adopting a stringent Business Plan on the Future Role and Functions of the Organization in June 1997. Activities laid out in the Business Plan are based on the clear comparative advantages of UNIDO, while avoiding overlap and duplication with other multilateral institutions. A key point was that activities should be integrated into packages of services, rather than being provided on a stand-alone basis. The Organization radically reformed itself on the basis of this business plan and streamlined its services, human and financial resources as well as internal processes during the following years.

=== Post-reform role ===
On the basis of sound finances and in a second wave of programmatic reforms in 2004, UNIDO further focused its activities and technical services directly responding to international development priorities. In an independent assessment of 23 international organizations against a large numbers of criteria, UNIDO was assessed 6th best overall and as best in the group of specialized agencies. In regard of the current UN Reform debate, it can be observed that UNIDO is actively contributing to UN system-wide coherence and cost efficiency.

== Governance ==
=== Membership ===
Members, List A Members, List B Members, List C Members, List D former parties

Members of the UN, or of UN specialized agencies, or of the IAEA, are eligible for membership with UNIDO. The process of becoming a Member of the Organization is achieved by becoming a party to the Constitution. Observer status is open, upon request, to those enjoying such status in the General Assembly of the United Nations, unless the UNIDO General Conference decides otherwise. The Conference has the authority to invite other observers to participate in the work of the Organization in accordance with the relevant rules of procedure and the provisions of the Constitution.

As of 4 October 2024, 173 States are Members of UNIDO, all except State of Palestine of them being UN members. UNIDO Members are divided into four lists. List A consists of all UNIDO countries in the African + Asian Groups of UN (along with Israel, while excluding Cyprus and Japan). List B consists of all UNIDO countries in WEOG group of UN (along with Cyprus and Japan, and excluding Israel). List C consists of all UNIDO countries in GRULAC group of UN. List D consists of all UNIDO countries in the Eastern European group of UN.

The lists, originally defined in General Assembly resolution 2152 and the UNIDO Constitution serve to balance geographical distribution of member states' representation on the Industrial Development Board and the Programme and Budget Committee.

UNIDO is one of the two UN specialized agencies where members are separated into groups while the other is IFAD. UNIDO List B, is similar to IFAD List A – which comprises primarily developed countries, while the set of the rest of UNIDO members is similar to the set of the rest of IFAD members – which comprise primarily developing countries.

The full lists are as follows:

List A (100 members): Afghanistan, Algeria, Angola, Bahrain, Bangladesh, Benin, Bhutan, Botswana, Burkina Faso, Burundi, Cambodia, Cameroon, Cape Verde, Central African Republic, Chad, China, Comoros, Congo, Ivory Coast, DR Congo, Djibouti, Egypt, Equatorial Guinea, Eritrea, Eswatini, Ethiopia, Fiji, Gabon, Gambia, Ghana, Guinea, Guinea-Bissau, India, Indonesia, Iran, Iraq, Israel, Jordan, Kazakhstan, Kenya, Kiribati, North Korea, South Korea, Kuwait, Kyrgyzstan, Laos, Lebanon, Lesotho, Liberia, Libya, Madagascar, Malawi, Malaysia, Maldives, Mali, Marshall Islands, Mauritania, Mauritius, Micronesia, Mongolia, Morocco, Mozambique, Myanmar, Namibia, Nepal, Niger, Nigeria, Oman, Pakistan, Palau, State of Palestine, Papua New Guinea, Philippines, Qatar, Rwanda, Samoa, São Tomé and Príncipe, Saudi Arabia, Senegal, Seychelles, Sierra Leone, Solomon Islands, Somalia, South Africa, South Sudan, Sri Lanka, Sudan, Syria, Tajikistan, Thailand, Timor-Leste, Togo, Tonga, Tunisia, Tuvalu, Uganda, United Arab Emirates, Tanzania, Turkmenistan, Uzbekistan, Vanuatu, Vietnam, Yemen, Zambia, Zimbabwe.

List B (21 members): Austria, Cyprus, Finland, Germany, Ireland, Italy, Japan, Luxembourg, Malta, Monaco, Netherlands, Norway, Spain, Sweden, Switzerland, Turkey.

List C (32 members): Antigua and Barbuda, Argentina, The Bahamas, Barbados, Belize, Bolivia, Brazil, Chile, Colombia, Costa Rica, Cuba, Dominica, Dominican Republic, Ecuador, El Salvador, Grenada, Guatemala, Guyana, Haiti, Honduras, Jamaica, Mexico, Nicaragua, Panama, Paraguay, Peru, Saint Kitts and Nevis, Saint Lucia, Saint Vincent and the Grenadines, Suriname, Trinidad and Tobago, Uruguay, Venezuela.

List D (20 members): Albania, Armenia, Azerbaijan, Belarus, Bosnia and Herzegovina, Bulgaria, Croatia, Czech Republic, Georgia, Hungary, Montenegro, North Macedonia, Poland, Republic of Moldova, Romania, Russian Federation, Serbia, Slovenia, Ukraine.

Former UNIDO members are Australia (1985–97, List B), Belgium (1985–2015, List B), Canada (1985–93, List B), Denmark (1985–2016, List B), France (1985–2014, List B), Greece (1985–2016, List B), Lithuania (1991–2012, List D), New Zealand (1985–2013, List B), Portugal (1985–2014, List B), Slovakia (1993–2017), United Kingdom (1985–2012, List B), and the United States (1985–96, List B).

Other UN member states that have never signed, ratified, or denounced the constitution are Andorra, Brunei, Estonia, Iceland, Latvia, Liechtenstein, Nauru, San Marino, and Singapore.

The Holy See and the Sovereign Military Order of Malta have observer status with UNIDO.

=== Policy-making organs ===
The policy-making organs (or governing bodies) of UNIDO are based on their predecessors that were effective prior to UNIDO becoming a specialized agency. Thus, the General Conference, the Industrial Development Board (IDB) and the Programme and Budget Committee (PBC) are anchored in the Constitution.

Substantive decisions of the policy-making organs are generally taken by consensus. A vote takes place when no consensus can be reached or on specific request of a member of the policy-making organ

==== General Conference ====
The Conference is the highest policy-making organ of the Organization and consists of all Member States of UNIDO. It meets every two years and approves the programme and budgets, establishes the scale assessments for regular budget expenditures for the forthcoming biennium and, every second time, appoints the Director-General for a period of four years.

==== Industrial Development Board (IDB) ====
The Board meets once in Conference years and twice in other years, and consists of 53 Member States of the Organization that are elected for a four-year term. It acts as a preparatory body for the Conference and reviews the implementation of the approved programme of work and of the corresponding regular and operational budgets for the forthcoming biennium. Among its other main functions, the Board recommends to the Conference a scale of assessments, as well as a candidate for the post of Director-General.

==== Programme and Budget Committee (PBC) ====
The Committee consists of 27 Member States of the Organization that are elected for a two-year term and meets at least once a year to consider, inter alia, the proposals of the Director-General for the programme of work and corresponding estimates for the regular and operational budgets.

=== Secretariat ===
The Secretariat of UNIDO is based in Vienna (Austria) and maintains representative offices in Brussels (Belgium), Geneva (Switzerland) and New York City (USA). As of 2013, UNIDO's organizational structure comprises The Office of the Director-General (ODG), the Programme Development and Technical Cooperation Division (PTC), the Office of the Deputy to the Director General (DDG), the Programme Support and General Management Division (PSM) as well as offices of Internal Oversight and Legal Services.

The current Director-General of UNIDO is Gerd Müller (since December 2021).

== Country level representation ==
=== Field representation ===
UNIDO's system of field representation includes four categories of offices:

- Regional offices, which cover the country of their location as well as a number of countries in the same region, in which the Organization assumes the status of a non-resident agency
- Country Offices, which cover their host country
- Focal point offices maintained within national governments
- UNIDO Desks in UNDP offices.

=== Technical offices at country level ===
In order to provide additional support to UNIDO's technical activities, different types of technical offices have been established. These include:

- Investment and Technology Promotion Offices (ITPOs), which promote investment and technology flows to developing countries and countries with economies in transition, being financed by their host countries
- International Technology Centres, which act as catalysts for technology upgrading and assist in managing technology change
- In collaboration with the United Nations Environment Programme (UNEP), UNIDO set up a global network of National Cleaner Production Centres (NCPCs), aiming at building national capacities in clean production technologies, fostering dialogue between industry and government and enhancing investments for transfer and development of environmentally sound technologies.
- UNIDO's Industrial Subcontracting and Partnership Exchanges (SPX) facilitate production linkages between small, medium and large manufacturing firms and link up with global markets and supply chain networks.
- UNIDO Centres for South-South Cooperation as part of a major UNIDO South-South cooperation initiative in several of the more advanced developing countries.

== See also ==
- United Nations Development Programme
- United Nations Environment Programme
- United Nations Food and Agriculture Organization
- World Trade Organization
- Chemical Leasing

== Sources ==
- Industrial Development Report (IDR): UNIDO Flagship Publication
- UNIDO Annual Reports
- UNIDO Constitution
