= Nancy Beck =

American government official

Nancy Beck is an appointee in the Environmental Protection Agency under the second Donald Trump administration and former executive at the American Chemistry Council, a lobbying group for American chemical companies. In her role at the EPA, she evaluates chemical safety. According to The Washington Post, "Beck is known for fighting strict chemical regulations and aligning policy with industry interests."

In the second Trump administration, she pushed to deregulate chemicals that other EPA staff and scientists had raised health and environment concerns about. Beck was also in a similar position in the first Trump administration where she was "credited with leading a wide-ranging pushback against chemical regulations." In the EPA, Beck sought to scale back proposed bans on asbestos and methylene chloride. She also rewrote rules to make it harder to track PFAS ("forever chemicals"). She sought to reverse proposed bans on TCE, a solvent linked to cancer. Career officials at the EPA have raised objections to Beck's proposed changes.

She worked in the EPA during the George W. Bush administration. She was forced out by the Barack Obama administration.

Before joining the American Chemistry Council, Beck was an analyst for the Office of Management and Budget for a decade.
