= Ibrahim Helmi Abdel-Rahman =

Ibrahim Helmi Abd-elRahman
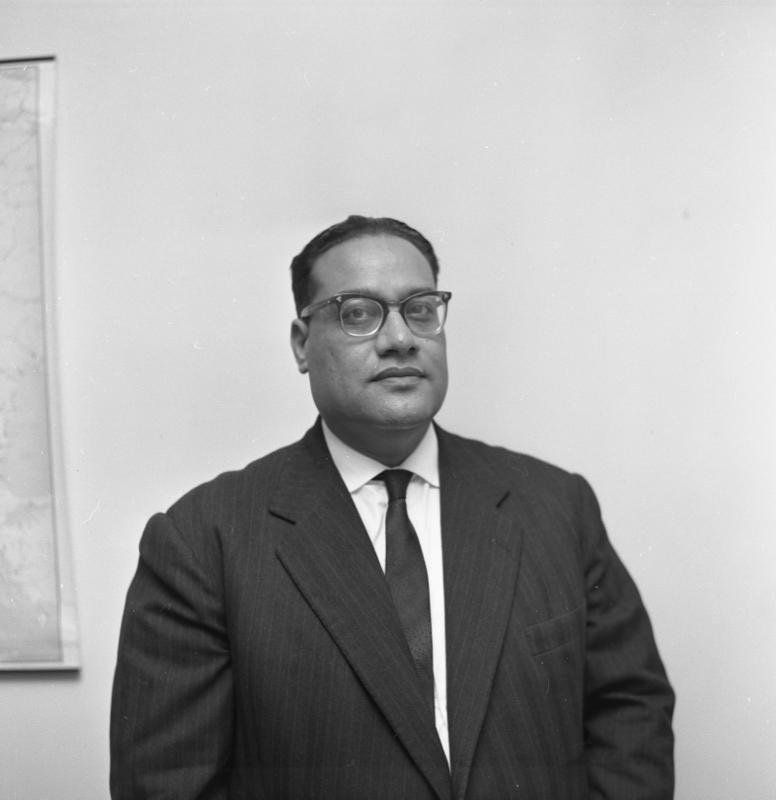
- Born: Kafr Alwlga
- Died: 1998

Dr Ibrahim Helmi Abd-elRahman was born in the village of Kafr Alwlga of the Center for Kafr shokr Qalyubiyya in the Arab Republic of Egypt, he died in 1998 . His father al-Sheikh / Abd ElRahman Helba was the mayor of the village Kafr Alwlga.

Established the Ministry of National Planning and Follow-up in Egypt. The Egyptian Minister of Planning and former under President Anwar Sadat, a scientist in the planning, astronomy and economics and a professor in the translation.

He was the first executive head of the United Nations Industrial Development Organization (UNIDO) 1966–1974 .
