= African Reclaimers Organisation =

South Africa–based non-profit organisation

The African Reclaimers Organisation (ARO) is a membership-based, democratic non-profit organisation of informal waste reclaimers, primarily operating in Johannesburg, Gauteng, South Africa, with additional activities in Mpumalanga province. Founded in 2018 following the formation of the Interim Johannesburg Reclaimers Committee in 2017 to oppose municipal policies that displaced street reclaimers in favour of private contractors, ARO unites reclaimers from both streets and landfills across nationalities. The group advocates for the recognition, rights, and economic inclusion of reclaimers in South Africa's recycling sector.

== History ==
The African Reclaimers Organisation emerged from earlier efforts by waste reclaimers in Johannesburg to organise against municipal policies that threatened their livelihoods. In 2017, reclaimers organised the first march uniting landfill and street workers in response to the City of Johannesburg's plans to contract private companies for recyclable collection in high-income areas which displaced informal reclaimers. This protest led to the formation of the Interim Johannesburg Reclaimers Committee as a temporary body to challenge those contracts. The committee succeeded in halting two of the proposed contracts.

On 2 September 2018, the group publicly introduced itself as the African Reclaimers Organisation. It adopted this name to reflect a broader inclusive structure that united reclaimers from streets and landfills and welcomed members of all nationalities. The organisation registered as a non-profit, membership-based democratic entity focused on representing reclaimers' interests, defending their right to participate in recycling, and promoting environmental sustainability.

In the following years the organisation expanded its activities. By 2019, it had partnered with entities such as Unilever South Africa and the University of the Witwatersrand on a pilot project to demonstrate inclusive circular economy models involving reclaimers in separation-at-source services. It also began collaborating with resident groups in suburbs including Auckland Park, Brixton, and Bordeaux, Gauteng to establish weekly collection programmes where households separated recyclables for reclaimers to pick up. The group distributed recycling bins to schools, residences, and small businesses. These efforts were often undertaken in partnership with organisations like Petco South Africa, a producer responsibility organisation.

During the COVID-19 pandemic, the ARO launched fundraising efforts using platforms such as Back-a-Buddy to provide food, sanitation supplies, and other aid to members unable to work during lockdowns. It distributed assistance to over two thousand reclaimers and their families while obtaining additional support from the government and companies. It continued school outreach to educate youth on recycling.

In 2021, the African Reclaimers Organisation received the World Wildlife Fund Living Planet Award. It deepened partnerships with the World Bank, producer responsibility organisations, and the Alliance to End Plastic Waste to advance reclaimer registration, training, and integration into the formal economy more generally. A key part of this was registering reclaimers in the South Africa Waste Pickers Registration System which issued identity cards and enabled access to service fees from producer responsibility organisations, banking, social services, and other benefits.

By 2023, membership had grown to between 5,500 and 6,000 reclaimers including about 2,000 women. ARO maintained sorting facilities in the Johannesburg area and one in Mpumalanga. Reclaimers affiliated with the group handled 80–90% used packaging collected for recycling in South Africa.

In 2024, the organisation reported diverting over 14,000 tonnes of plastic waste to formal waste management systems. It continued providing training on health and safety, supplying personal protective equipment, and upgrading equipment such as trolleys, trucks, and balers. It opposed proposals like recycling levies by the City of Johannesburg while pushing for expanded resident-reclaimer collaborations.

As of late 2025 the group addressed emerging challenges including landfill capacity issues in Johannesburg where closures threatened reclaimer livelihoods. It rejected certain social plans that excluded non-South African members and advocated for inclusivity.
