= American Plastics Council =

American trade association

- Abbreviation: APC
- Type: Trade association
- Purpose: Promote the plastics industry and the benefits of plastics
- Region served: United States
- Members: 22 resin manufacturers + 1 affiliated vinyl industry association
- Parent organization: American Chemistry Council

The American Plastics Council (APC) is a defunct trade association for the U.S. plastics industry. Through a variety of outreach efforts, APC worked to promote the benefits of plastics and the plastics industry.

== Overview ==
APC comprised 22 of the leading resin manufacturers, plus one affiliated trade association representing the vinyl industry. APC's membership represented more than 80 percent of the U.S. monomer and polymer production and distribution capacity.

Initially autonomous, the APC merged in 2002 with the American Chemistry Council (ACC, formerly known as the Manufacturing Chemists' Association, then the Chemical Manufacturers Association, renamed ACC in June 2000). Members are now represented by the ACC.
