= Chemical leasing =

Business model

Chemical leasing is a business model that intends to shift the focus from increasing sales volume of chemicals towards a value-added approach. It intends to address unnecessary over-consumption of chemicals by charging consumers based on functions performed by the chemicals rather than by volume. This treatment of chemical supply as selling a service than selling a product leads to efficient use of chemicals, and to improved health and safety, environmental, and economic benefits.

== Definitions ==
The term chemical leasing is the name of a business model and is not the same thing as leasing of chemicals, although it may include leasing operations.

The producer mainly sells the functions performed by chemical and functional units, such as the number of pieces painted, which are the main basis for payment. It is a business model in which a customer engages with a service provider in a strategic, long-term contract to supply and manage the customer's chemical and related services.

Chemical leasing is applied in many companies, but sometimes under different names. Similar concepts include eco-efficient services, product-service systems, pay-per-use, circular economy, performance-based, functional-based, service-oriented, chemicals-as-a-service, and others. The United Nations Industrial Development Organization (UNIDO) defines chemical leasing as follows:

- Chemical leasing is a service-oriented business model that shifts the focus from increasing sales volume of chemicals towards a value-added approach.
- The producer mainly sells the functions performed by the chemical and its functional units are the main basis for payment.
- Within chemical leasing business models, the responsibility of the user and the supplier is extended and may include management of the entire lifecycle.
- Chemical leasing aims at increasing the efficient use of chemicals while reducing the risks of chemicals and protecting human health. It improves the economic and environmental performance of participating companies and enhances their access to new markets.
- Key elements of successful chemical leasing business models are proper benefit sharing, high-quality standards and mutual trust between participating companies.

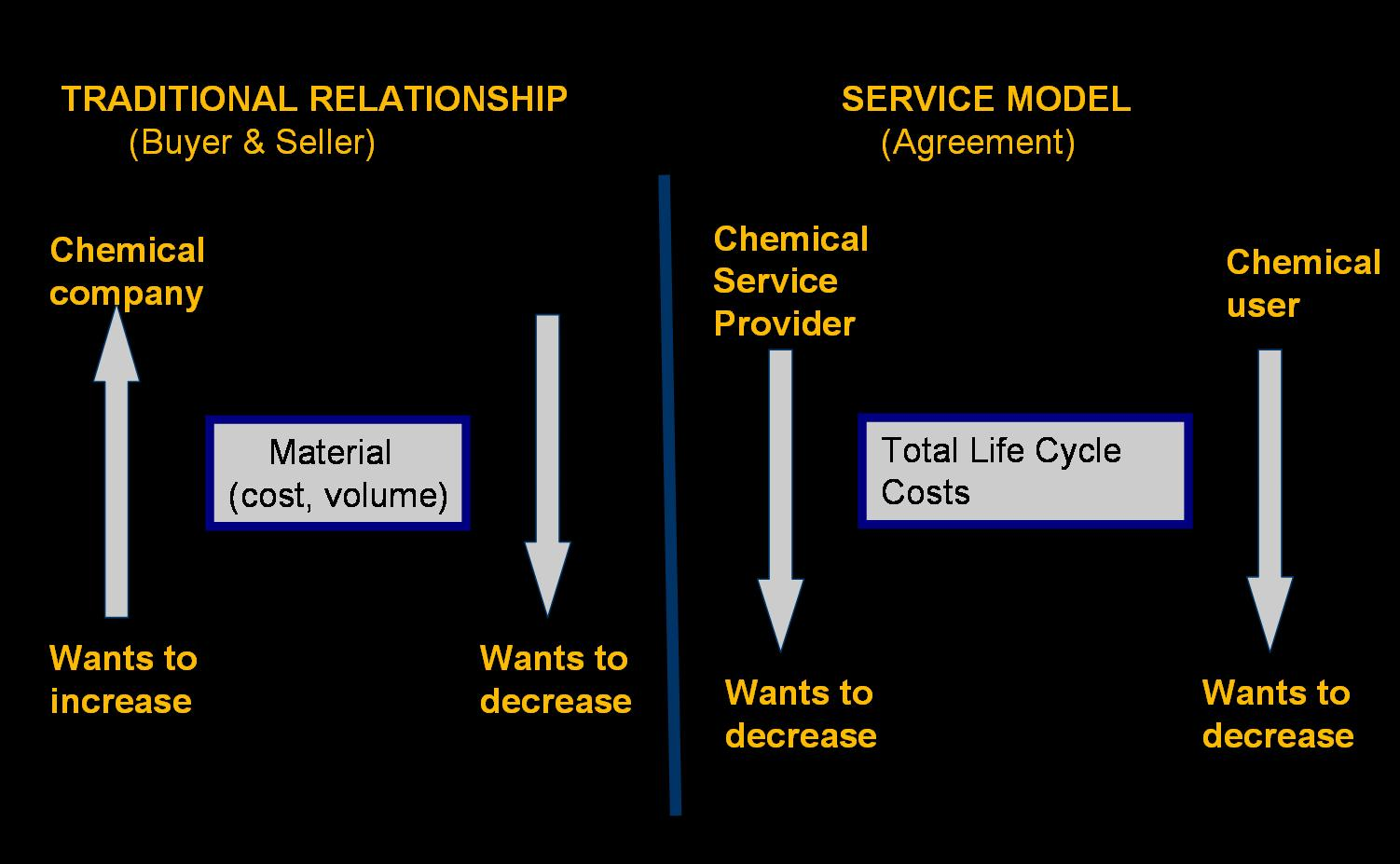
Differences between traditional buyer-seller relationship and service-based model of chemical leasing.

Chemical leasing promotes the sustainable management of chemicals. By shifting the focus from increasing the sales volume of chemicals towards a more value-added approach, it is an illustration of extended producer responsibility. The chemical company supplies chemicals for a specific service, such as coatings, adhesives, washing agents, solvents, and also advises the user on its best use.

Built on strong cooperation between partners and based on mutual trust, it increases the efficient use of chemicals, reduces the risks to human health brought about by their use, improves the economic and environmental performance of participating companies and ultimately enhances business performance.

== Globalization ==
The Austrian government has played an important role in promoting chemical management based on resource efficiency and precaution. When Austria held the Presidency of the European Union during the first half of 2006, chemicals policy was on top of the environmental agenda. Austria continues to promote chemical leasing. The Federal Environment Agency (UBA) of Germany proposed to promote chemical leasing in its "Sustainable Chemicals" paper.

== UNIDO ==
In 2004, the UNIDO and the Austrian Ministry of Environment decided to jointly support chemical leasing through a number of global projects. In partnership with National Cleaner Production Centers, UNIDO implemented chemical leasing projects in Austria, Egypt, Mexico, and Russia. Since then, pilot projects have been conducted in Latin and South America, Africa, Europe and Asia. Nowadays, more than 100 companies worldwide have included chemical leasing in their business strategies.

Chemical leasing can be applied in many industries and processes, ranging from car manufacturing to cleaning operations, wastewater treatment, textiles, beverage and food production. A joint declaration of intent on chemical leasing was signed between UNIDO, Austria, Germany and Switzerland in November 2016.

== Examples ==
Akzo Nobel Powder Coatings S.A.E has supported the chemical leasing of powder coating in Egypt to ABB ARAB. Environmental benefits are said to include recycling of powder waste, compliance with environmental regulations, and enhancement of supply chain management.

== REACH ==
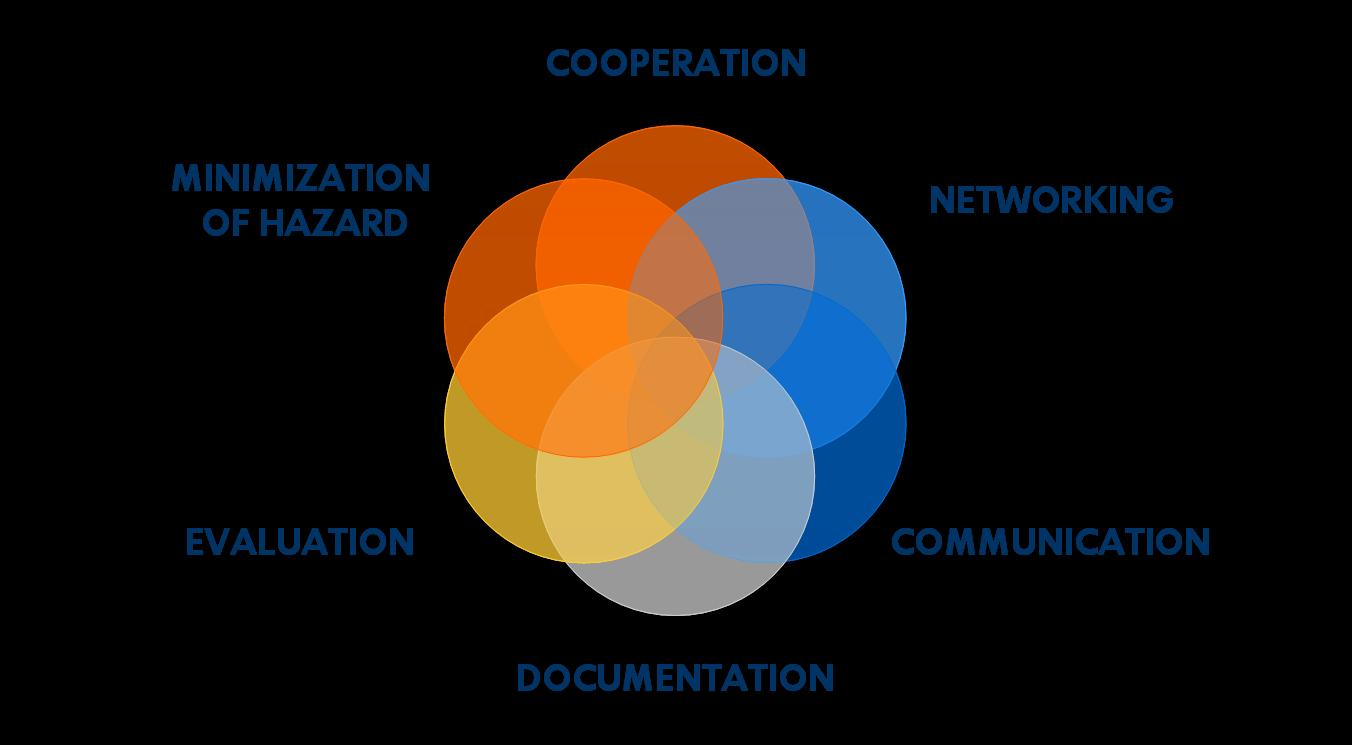
Synergies between chemical leasing and EU REACH legislation.

The reversal of the burden of proof is a key component of the Registration, Evaluation, Authorisation and Restriction of Chemicals (REACH) system leading to a "no data – no market" concept, obliging producers or importers of substances to deliver documentation regarding properties of chemicals and possible risks during their application as a pre-condition for market access. The Organisation for Economic Co-operation and Development (OECD) conference in Vienna in 2003 November reiterated that, "... The new EU chemicals policy (REACH) will require a new relationship between provider and user ...." According to Thomas Jakl, Chairman of the European Chemical Agency (ECHA), chemical leasing paves the way to comply with REACH obligations.

Chemical leasing and REACH share the same philosophy of ensuring compliance with a duty of care (REACH recital 16), as a tool to demonstrate adequate control (REACH para 60). They are mutually supportive in developing rules for sharing costs, and ensuring that chemicals are handled properly. Both are involved in several different stages of the supply chain. There is a strong effort by the Austrian and German governments to bring chemical leasing within the purview of EU Chemicals policy and regulations.

== Project phases ==
Chemical leasing projects are divided into planning, implementation, evaluation and dissemination stages, based on a Deming Cycle. The planning stage consists of a preparatory phase, a process optimisation phase and a design phase. In this stage, discussions around the leasing model, its cost implications versus quality and environmental benefits, commercial terms, and conditions begin. A baseline audit is performed, and a report presented to the factory management. This audit outlines the potential for improvements and forms the basis of defining the key performance indicators (KPIs). The resources needed to fulfil improvements are also defined.

The implementation stage starts with the signing of a chemical leasing agreement that defines the scope and conditions, unit of payment, KPIs, roles, and responsibilities. The chemical company supervises the chemical process, transporting and managing the inventory, laboratory management, improving process controls, record keeping, and training workers. Periodic checks and inspections are carried out independently to verify that the implementation is proceeding on expected lines. At the end of the implementation phase, progress is evaluated, often by an external party to secure objectivity. Finally, any project benefits are quantified and learning is documented, to provide input for future projects.

== Global Chemical Leasing Award ==
The Global Chemical Leasing Award was launched in 2009, and award ceremonies were organised for the years 2010, 2012, 2014, 2018, and 2021. The award intends to enhance the global visibility of chemical leasing, acknowledge best practices and inspire companies and individuals around the globe to apply the business concept by reducing the inefficient use and over-consumption of chemicals and developing strong business partnerships and innovation along the entire supply chain.
