= Alliance to End Plastic Waste =

Environmental non-profit organization

- Type: 501(c)(3) nonprofit organization
- Purpose: Environmental advocacy
- Headquarters: Singapore
- Region served: Worldwide
- President and CEO: Jacob Duer
- Website: Official website

The Alliance to End Plastic Waste (AEPW) is a non-profit organization headquartered in Singapore.

== History ==
The Alliance to End Plastic Waste was founded in 2019.

AEPW promised in 2020 to spend US$1.5 billion by 2024 to reduce plastic pollution and increase recycling efforts. In September 2020 the group reported facilitating $400 million spent on projects in Southeast Asia, Africa and India. As of August 2025, catalyzed spending had reached $610.89 million.

AEPW has been criticized for promoting reduction of plastic waste over cuts in production. AEPW and has been widely called a greenwashing campaign.Its five-year recycling target of 15 million tonnes is only 0.8% of the 1.8 billion tonnes of plastic waste production, and the actual recycling of plastic waste during 2019-2021 was only 4 thousand tonnes, compared to the 3-year target of 9 million tonnes.

In 2025, AEPW moved to a systems change model that blends public and private funding in targeted countries such as Brazil, Indonesia, India, South Africa, and member states of the Gulf Cooperation Council in addition to thematic programmes in both developed and emerging markets. AEPW's systems-based approach addresses systemic problems that inhibit developing a circular economy for plastics.

AEPW works with development finance institutions (DFIs). DFIs use both public and private capital to fund projects that would otherwise be unable to receive commercial financing. AEPW can facilitate financing from development banks by helping them de-risk via co-funding, sharing technical expertise, etc.

== Country programmes ==
=== Brazil ===
AEPW works in Brazil through Recicleiros, an Alliance-funded non-profit organization. It focuses on developing sustainable and economically viable recycling systems in Brazil. Launched in 2019 with a pilot in Ceará, Recicleiros establishes public recycling programs in small and medium-sized cities where infrastructure is usually poor. It does this by building sorting centers, formalizing waste collection, and integrating informal waste pickers into cooperatives. It emphasizes social inclusion through better working conditions, technical support, and training for cooperative members. Activities include community education on proper waste sorting, behaviour change campaigns, and convening plastics value chain stakeholders to improve waste management.

=== Indonesia ===
In March of 2025, AEPW started a project in four Indonesian villages in the Malang Regency of East Java. The project includes door-to-door collection and management of household waste and recyclable materials. AEPW provides funding and technical support for relevant infrastructure and equipment. Local governments have provided land and on-going funding for the wages of sanitation workers. Hiring for this project prioritised village residents. Plastic, glass, and metal collected by the program are sold to local recyclers to provide additional funding. Participating households are charged collection fees. Affecting behaviourial change among residents is an important goal of the project.

=== India ===
AEPW operates its India country programme by focusing on large-scale municipal infrastructure and the integration of informal waste collection into formal supply chains. During the PLASTINDIA 2026 conference, AEPW committed to mobilize approximately $200 million in collective financing for integrated waste management systems across the country.

One of AEPW's initiatives in India is the Aviral project in Haridwar and Rishikesh. It was created with help from the German development agency GIZ to intercept plastic waste before entering the Ganga River. This project utilizes material recovery facilities to collect and sort debris. Digital tracking systems are used to monitor the movement of materials from collection points to final processing sites. Non-recyclable plastics gathered through this system are often redirected to cement kilns to be used as fuel.

"Let’s Transform" focuses on the socioeconomic aspects of waste management by addressing the needs of India’s waste pickers. In collaboration with Saahas Waste Management, the programme gives such workers official identification cards that facilitate access to government services and healthcare. It also offers technical training to waste aggregators to improve health and safety standards and compliance with the National Extended Producer Responsibility targets.

AEPW supports ParikraM in Mathura-Vrindavan, which uses machine learning to improve collection efficiency, and RESIN8, which converts mixed plastic waste into synthetic aggregates for the construction industry.

=== South Africa ===
The African Reclaimers Organisation (ARO) was formed in 2018 in Johannesburg, South Africa, as a membership-based advocacy group for informal waste pickers. The organisation originated from the Interim Johannesburg Reclaimers Committee, which was established to oppose municipal waste management policies that favored private contractors and threatened to displace informal workers. These workers, known locally as reclaimers, perform a significant portion of South Africa's recycling labor by collecting and sorting waste from streets and landfills. Estimates indicate that reclaimers are responsible for collecting about 80% to 90% of recycled paper and packaging in the country, which reduces municipal landfill costs by an estimated R780 million annually. The organization functions as a democratic entity to advocate for the legal recognition of reclaimers and to secure their integration into the formal economy as environmental service providers.

Assistance from the AEPW began shortly after the Alliance’s launch in 2019. Help from AEPW focused mainly on the formalization and technical improvement of the organization’s operations, particularly through the development of the South African Waste Picker Registration System. Introduced as a pilot program between May 2021 and June 2022 in coordination with the World Bank and the University of the Witwatersrand, the system was designed to provide reclaimers with official identification cards. These credentials are used to verify the occupational status of workers, which facilitates their movement through urban areas and access to government services. Financial support from AEPW during this period was also directed toward the acquisition of infrastructure, such as collection vehicles and industrial equipment for sorting and baling materials. These resources helped the organization to process larger quantities of waste at its Johannesburg facility and prepare materials for sale.

In 2025, AEPW helped the organisation acquire and implement digital tracking systems to monitor the volume and type of plastic waste collected by its members. This data is used to ensure compliance with South Africa's Extended Producer Responsibility regulations, which require proof of collection for waste pickers to receive service fees from producers.

== Thematic programmes ==
=== Film and flexibles ===
AEPW's first thematic programme is targeted at film and flexibles, a form of plastic that is rarely recycled. Relevant projects will focus mainly on high-income countries in Europe and North America as they typically have good waste management infrastructure, strong environmental protections, and the necessary resources for advanced recycling initiatives.

Flexible plastic containers are usually made from multiple polymers such as polyethylene, polypropylene, etc., combined with inks, adhesives, and barrier layers like aluminium. Multiple materials improve performance but frustrate recycling efforts. Recycled flexible plastics struggle to compete with virgin polymers due to cost and quality. Most material harvested from flexible plastic containers gets downcycled instead of being reused in high-performance film applications.

AEPW supports addressing the issues surrounding the recycling of flexible plastic containers by improving collection and sorting to produce more homogeneous feedstock; using Product Category Rules (PCR) targets and Extended Producer Responsibility (EPR) schemes to incentivize demand for relevant recyclates; encouraging investment in recycling plants through regulatory stability, tax incentives, and subsidies; and internationally harmonised design guidelines to make packaging easier to recycle; and EPR fees to incentivize increased reyclabilty.

== Other initiatives ==
=== Holy Grail 2.0 ===
The Digital Watermarks Initiative HolyGrail 2.0 was a research and development project that ended in March 2025. Facilitated by AIM, the European Brands Association, and funded by AEPW, the programme aimed to prove the viability of using digital watermarks for high-speed sorting of plastic packaging waste. The project evolved from the initial HolyGrail 1.0 project led by the Ellen MacArthur Foundation.

Digital watermarking in this context involves embedding imperceptible, postage-stamp-sized optical codes directly into the artwork or mold of consumer packaging. These watermarks carry detailed attributes, such as the material composition, the manufacturer, and whether the product was intended for food or non-food applications. In a waste sorting facility, high-resolution cameras on existing sorting lines detect and decode these markings, allowing air jets to sort material with great speed and precision.

The project progressed through three distinct phases of testing and validation. Phase one involved prototype validation of the detection units, followed by semi-industrial trials in 2021 at the Amager Resource Centre in Copenhagen. These tests used about 125,000 pieces of packaging to evaluate detection and ejection efficiency under simulated industrial conditions, including crushed and soiled items. Between August and December 2024, the project entered its final phase of industrial-scale trials at the Hündgen Entsorgung facility in Germany. These trials processed over 5.6 million detections across nearly 6,000 unique products, achieving accuracy rates consistently above 90%.

More than 130 companies representing the entire packaging value chain participated, including major manufacturers such as Procter & Gamble, PepsiCo, Nestlé, and Mondelēz International, as well as retailers like Aldi and Henkel. Digimarc provided the watermarking software, while machine vendors such as Pellenc ST and Tomra developed the sorting hardware. Following the successful conclusion of HolyGrail 2.0, a successor initiative, HolyGrail 2030, was launched in April 2025 to focus on full-scale market adoption and the business case for circular polypropylene packaging in accordance with the European Union’s Packaging and Packaging Waste Regulation.

=== Plastic Circularity Fund ===
AEPW and Lombard Odier Investment Managers established the Plastic Circularity Fund in 2022 to address financing gaps in the waste management sector. The Alliance provided an initial US$10 million investment and serves as a technical advisor to the fund, which reached its first closing in September 2023 with additional backing from companies such as Dow and LyondellBasell. The fund intends to raise a total of US$500 million to finance growth-stage companies involved in the plastic value chain, with a special emphasis plastic waste reduction and lowering emissions. Investments are directed toward three areas: material development, new usage models, and recycling infrastructure. This includes bio-based or compostable polymers, reuse and refill systems, and technologies for sorting and chemical recycling.

By late 2024, the fund had bought into four companies, including Calyxia, a firm that produces biodegradable microcapsules for industrial applications. The fund wants to achieve a net internal rate of return in the mid-to-high teens.

=== Greencycle Innovative Solutions ===
Greencycle Innovative Solutions (GIS) is a Quezon City-based waste management firm that specializes in the collection and recovery of low-value flexible plastic waste in Metro Manila and surrounding provinces that was founded in 2018. GIS is an industrial aggregator. It works with local junk shops and barangays to divert plastics that are typically excluded from recycling streams. In July 2024, the company formed a joint venture with Universal Robina Corporation to establish a plastic waste management system to assist businesses with meeting their obligations under the Philippines' Extended Producer Responsibility Act of 2022.

AEPW supports Greencycle via project-by-project funding and technical assistance with expanding its waste management infrastructure. Support from AEPW facilitated the opening of a flexible plastic processing facility in Quezon City in May 2023 and another such facility in Imus, Cavite in May 2024. These sites convert non-recyclable plastic waste into refuse-derived fuel (RDF) for use in cement plant co-processing. RDF is a coal substitute.

AEPW's work with Greencycle also touches on social welfare by working towards better conditions for women in the industry and providing equipment and working capital to informal waste pickers.

== Management ==
=== Jacob Duer ===
Jacob Duer serves as president and CEO of AEPW. Duer worked at the United Nations for 20 years. Duer holds an undergraduate degree in business administration and a graduate degree in management from the University of Aarhus.

== Membership and collaboration ==
Founding members of AEPW included BASF, Chevron Phillips Chemical, ExxonMobil, Dow Chemical, Mitsubishi Chemical Holdings, Procter & Gamble, and Shell.

As of January 2026, AEPW published the following list of members:

- 3P Gulf Group
- ALPS
- Amcor
- Ampacet
- Aspen Technology
- Astra Polymers
- BASF
- BoReTech
- Braskem
- Brightmark
- Brückner Group
- Chevron Phillips Chemical
- Dow Chemical Company
- Equate
- ExxonMobil
- Flexible Plastic Solutions
- Formosa Industries
- Formosa Plastics
- Gemini
- Greiner
- HMEL
- INDEVCO
- Inter Pipeline
- Kafrit Group
- Kirin Holdings
- LyondellBasell
- Milliken & Company
- Mitsubishi Chemical Group
- Mitsui Chemicals
- NOVA Chemicals
- Novacel
- Pellenc ST
- RAI
- Red Avenue New Materials Group
- Reliance Industries Limited
- SABIC
- Sasol
- SCG Chemicals
- Shell
- SIG Group
- Sinopec
- Sumitomo Chemical
- TOMRA
- TotalEnergies
- Uflex
- Valgroup
- Versalis
- Vinmar
- Vopak
- Westlake Corporation
- Yeloworld

== See also ==
- Waste management
