= European Chemical Industry Council =

Primary European trade association for the Chemical industry

Logo of Cefic

The European Chemical Industry Council or Cefic (from its former French name Conseil Européen des Fédérations de l'Industrie Chimique) is the main European trade association for the chemical industry. It was founded in 1972. Its headquarters are located in Brussels. Cefic is a not-for-profit organization which represents 28,000 large, medium and small chemical companies in Europe, interacting on behalf of their members with international and EU institutions, non-governmental organisations, the international media, and other stakeholders. The chemical industry is a prominent part of Europe’s economy of the future, with over 1.2 million workers, €499 billion turnover and €9.4 billion R&I investments.

Cefic supports the Paris Climate Agreement and a strong action on climate change in line with the scientific advice provided by the Intergovernmental Panel on Climate Change (IPCC). Cefic also supports the European Green Deal and Europe’s ambition to become climate neutral by 2050.

== History ==
The Conseil Européen des Fédérations de l'Industrie Chimique (Cefic) was created in 1972.

In 1990, the association changed its name to European Chemical Industry Council to reflect the integration of the chemical companies. The Cefic acronym was nevertheless retained.

On October 15, 2020, Dr. Martin Brudermüller, CEO of BASF, was elected President of Cefic. In 2022, he was re-elected. Brudermüller succeeded Mr. Daniele Ferrari (Versalis, Eni), who held the position from 2018 till 2020. Mr. Marco Mensink (previously Royal VNP) is the Director General of Cefic since May 2016.

== About Cefic ==
Cefic counts about 650 members and affiliates. Combined, they form one of the most active networks of the business community, complemented by partnerships with industry associations representing various sectors across the value chain. Cefic's organisational structure consists of a General Assembly, a Board, an Executive Committee, the National Association Board, a Leadership Team, five Programme Councils, three industry sector groups and three advisory fora.

== Activities ==
=== Accredited stakeholder ===
Cefic has been engaging as an accredited stakeholder to the European Food Safety Authority, the European Chemicals Agency and others. Cefic has also provided guidance and tools as well as libraries for enhancing harmonised implementation of the REACH Regulation.

== Commitment to sustainability ==
Cefic started focussing on sustainability in 1985, with the launch of the Responsible Care® programme – the industry’s commitment to improving safe production, handling and use of chemicals across the supply chains.

In 2016 Cefic and its members adopted a sustainability charter which provides a framework for action and dialogue on current and future challenges and includes a roadmap which contributes to the UN2030 Sustainable Development Goals and the Paris Agreement. Cefic’s Sustainable Development programme aims to support a transition towards a safe, resource-efficient, circular, low-carbon society.

== See also ==
- Together for Sustainability
