= Stink! =

- Directed by: Jon J. Whelan
- Written by: Bryan Gunnar Cole; Jon J. Whelan
- Produced by: Krista Saponara; Jon J. Whelan
- Distributed by: Net Return Entertainment
- Release date: November 27, 2015
- Running time: 91 minutes
- Country: United States
- Language: English

Stink! is a 2015 American documentary film directed by Jon J. Whelan. The film explores why there are toxins and carcinogens legally hidden in American consumer products. The film received multiple positive reviews. Stink! has appeared in 25 film festivals globally, and won multiple awards including Best Documentary Feature, at several film festivals. It premiered on Netflix on November 1, 2018.

== Critical reception ==
The film has received a rating of 89 percent on Rotten Tomatoes, based on nine reviews with an average rating of 5.50 out of 10. The New York Times called the documentary "sensible and unnerving" and "heartfelt". The Village Voice called Stink! "way more emotionally affecting.... than early Michael Moore." Variety wrote that its "arguments regarding toxic chemical pollutants found in everyday products are lucid and reasonable to the point of being inarguable" and it "carries with it the unassailable whiff of common sense.” The Boston Globe praised the film, saying, "Whelan's premise might be the stuff of farce, but what he uncovers is more than just a bad smell."

== Awards ==
The film has been shown in 25 film festivals globally and won numerous awards, including best documentary in the Memphis International Film Festival, best environmental film at the Sedona Film Festival, best environmental feature at the Atlanta International Documentary Film Festival, best documentary at the Carmel International Film Festival, and best of the fest at the First Glance Film Festival.

== Interviews ==
- Arlene Blum
- Jack Corley
- Richard Denison
- Calvin M. Dooley
- Steve Herman
- Jeffrey Hollender
- Jane Houlihan
- Andy Igrejas
- Steve Israel
- Karuna Jaggar
- JWoww
- Leonard Lance
- Christophe Laudamiel
- Stacy Malkan
- Michael Rayden
- Stephen Rosario
- Gretchen Lee Salter
- Jennifer Sass
- Janice Schakowsky
- Judi Shils
- Leonardo Trasande
- Jody Villecco
- Alexandra Zissu
