= Responsible Care =

Voluntary initiative

Started in Canada in 1985, Responsible Care is a global, voluntary initiative developed autonomously by the chemical industry for the chemical industry. It runs in 67 countries whose combined chemical industries account for nearly 90% of global chemical production. 96 of the 100 largest chemical producers in the world have adopted Responsible Care. The initiative is one of the leading examples of industry self-regulation and studies have shown it has not improved the industry's environmental and safety performance.

== History ==
Responsible Care was launched by the Chemistry Industry Association of Canada (formerly the Canadian Chemical Producers' Association - CCPA) in 1985. The term was coined by CIAC president Jean Bélanger. The scheme evolved, and, in 2006, The Responsible Care Global Charter was launched at the UN-led International Conference on Chemicals Management in Dubai. Today, the program is stewarded by the International Council of Chemical Associations.

== Goals ==
According to the chemical industry, the goal of the program is to improve health, safety, and environmental performance. A 2007 study concluded that the primary goals of the initiative are to change low public opinion and concerns about industry environmental and public health practices of the industry, while also opposing stronger and more expensive legislation and regulation of chemical products, even if warranted.

The signatory chemical companies agree to commit themselves to improve their performances in the fields of environmental protection, occupational safety and health protection, plant safety, product stewardship and logistics, as well as to continuously improve dialog with their neighbors and the public, independent from legal requirements. As part of Responsible Care initiative, the International Council of Chemical Associations introduced the Global Product Strategy in 2006.

== Criticism ==
The initiative has been studied as one of the leading examples of industry self-regulation. The program has been described as a way to help the chemical industry avoid regulation and to improve its public image in the wake of the 1984 Bhopal disaster. A 2000 study concluded that it demonstrates how industries fail to self-regulate without explicit sanctions. The study demonstrated that plants owned by RC participating firms improved their relative environmental performance more slowly than non members. According to a 2013 study, between 1988 and 2001, plants owned by RC participating firms raised their toxicity-weighted pollution by 15.9% on average relative to statistically-equivalent plants owned by non-RC participating firms.
