= Strem Chemicals =

Strem Chemicals, Inc.
- Company type: An Employee-Owned Company
- Founded: 1964
- Founder: Michael Strem
- Headquarters: Newburyport, Massachusetts, U.S.
- Area served: International
- Products: Fine chemicals, inorganic compounds
- Services: cGMP Facilities
- Website: www.strem.com

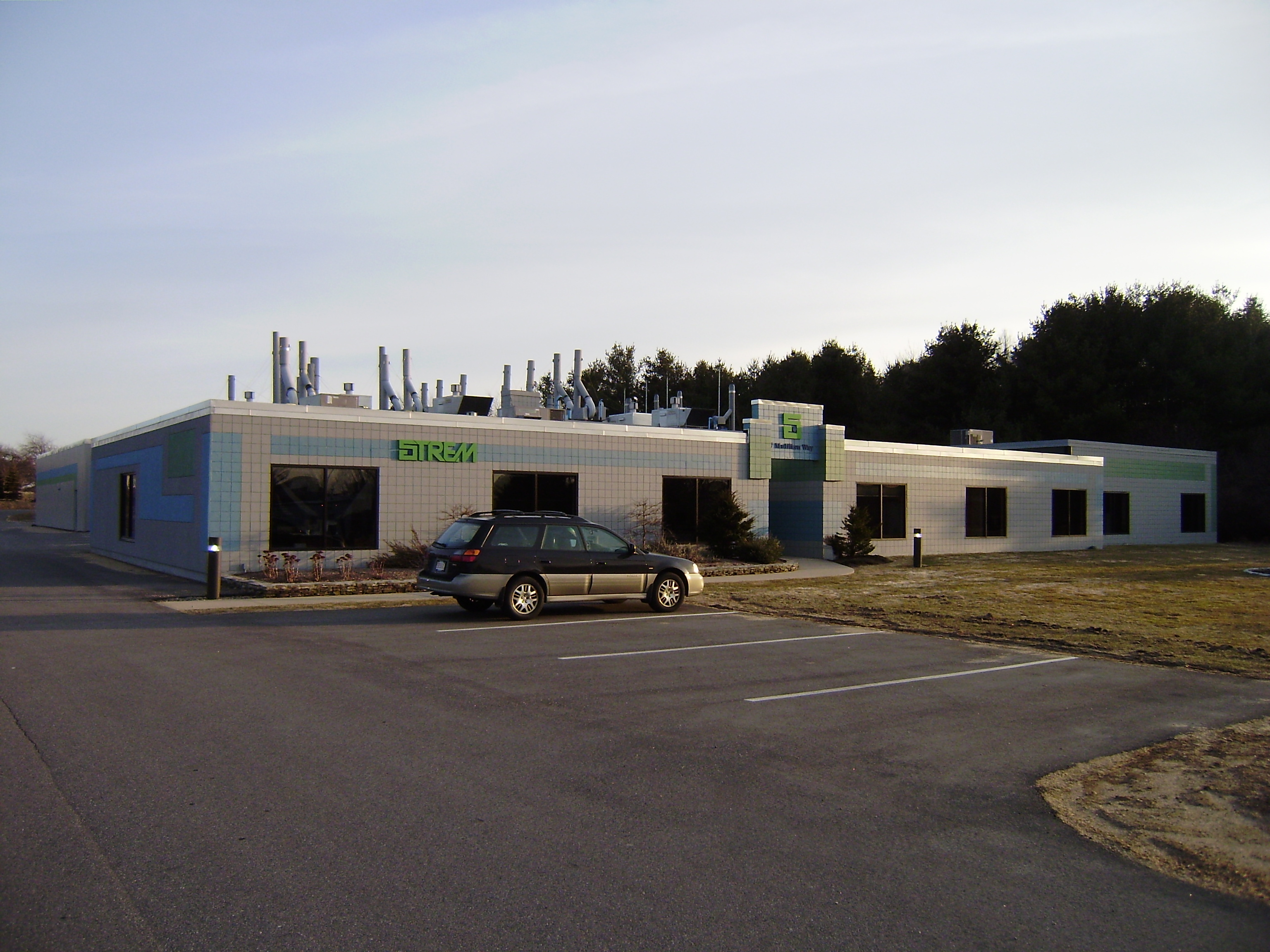
Strem at Newburyport

Strem Chemicals, Inc. is an employee-owned company specializing in fine chemicals in Newburyport, Massachusetts, United States. It was established in 1964 by Michael Strem.

While Michael Strem was a graduate student, he spent time in Dr. Irving Wender's laboratory learning to synthesize and use cobalt carbonyl. They discussed setting up a chemical company, which resulted in Strem Chemicals. Later, cobalt carbonyl became Strem Chemical's first commercial product.

Strem Chemicals manufactures and markets specialty chemicals of high purity, provides custom synthesis and cGMP manufacturing services, and supplies about 4,500 specialty products in the area of metals, inorganics, organometallics and nanomaterials.

Strem Chemicals supports the American Chemical Society Award for Distinguished Service in the Advancement of Inorganic Chemistry and the Canadian Society for Chemistry Award for Pure or Applied Chemistry.

In April 2021, Strem Chemicals was acquired by Ascensus Specialties.
