= Fine chemical =

Pure chemical substances produced by and for the chemical industry

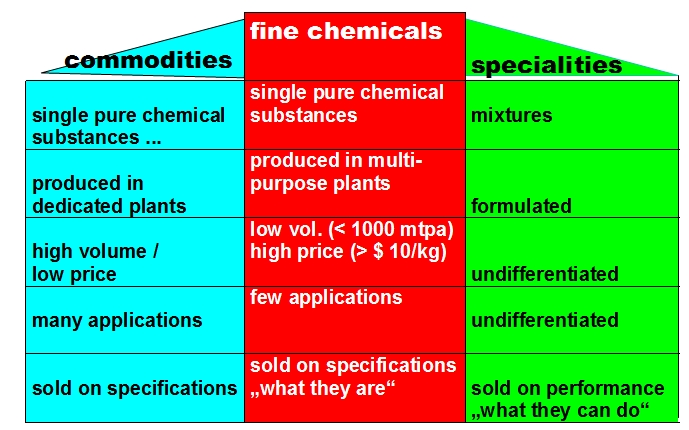
Definition of Fine Chemicals (as opposed to Commodities and Specialties)

In chemistry, fine chemicals are complex, single, pure chemical substances, produced in limited quantities in multipurpose plants by multistep batch chemical or biotechnological processes. They are described by exacting specifications, used for further processing within the chemical industry and sold for more than $10/kg (see the comparison of fine chemicals, commodities and specialties). The class of fine chemicals is subdivided either on the basis of the added value (building blocks, advanced intermediates or active ingredients), or the type of business transaction, namely standard or exclusive products.

Fine chemicals are produced in limited volumes (< 1000 tons/year) and at relatively high prices (> $10/kg) according to exacting specifications, mainly by traditional organic synthesis in multipurpose chemical plants. Biotechnical processes are gaining ground. Fine chemicals are used as starting materials for specialty chemicals, particularly pharmaceuticals, biopharmaceuticals and agrochemicals. Custom manufacturing for the life science industry plays a big role; however, a significant portion of the fine chemicals total production volume is manufactured in-house by large users. The industry is fragmented and extends from small, privately owned companies to divisions of big, diversified chemical enterprises. The term "fine chemicals" is used in distinction to "heavy chemicals", which are produced and handled in large lots and are often in a crude state.

Since the late 1970s, fine chemicals have become an important part of the chemical industry. Their global total production value of $85 billion is split about 60-40 between in-house production in the life-science industry—the products' main consumers—and companies producing them for sale. The latter pursue both a "supply push" strategy, whereby standard products are developed in-house and offered ubiquitously, and a "demand pull" strategy, whereby products or services determined by the customer are provided exclusively on a "one customer / one supplier" basis. The products are mainly used as building blocks for proprietary products.

The hardware of the top tier fine chemical companies has become almost identical: the design, lay-out and equipment of the plants and laboratories have become practically the same globally; most chemical reactions performed go back to the days of the dyestuff industry; and numerous regulations determine the way labs and plants must be operated, thereby contributing to the uniformity.

== History ==
The term "fine chemicals" was in use as early as 1908. The emergence of the fine chemical industry as a distinct entity dates to the late 1970s, when the overwhelming success of the histamine H_{2} receptor antagonists Tagamet (cimetidine) and Zantac (ranitidine hydrochloride) created a strong demand for advanced organic chemicals used in their manufacture. As the in-house production capacities of the originators, the pharmaceutical companies Smith, Kline, & French and Glaxo, could not keep pace with the rapidly increasing requirements, both companies (now merged as GlaxoSmithKline) outsourced part of the manufacturing to chemical companies experienced in producing relatively sophisticated organic molecules. Lonza, Switzerland, which had already had supplied an early intermediate, methyl acetoacetate, during drug development, soon became the main supplier of more and more advanced precursors. The signature of a first, simple supply contract is generally acknowledged as the historical document marking the beginning of the fine chemical industry.

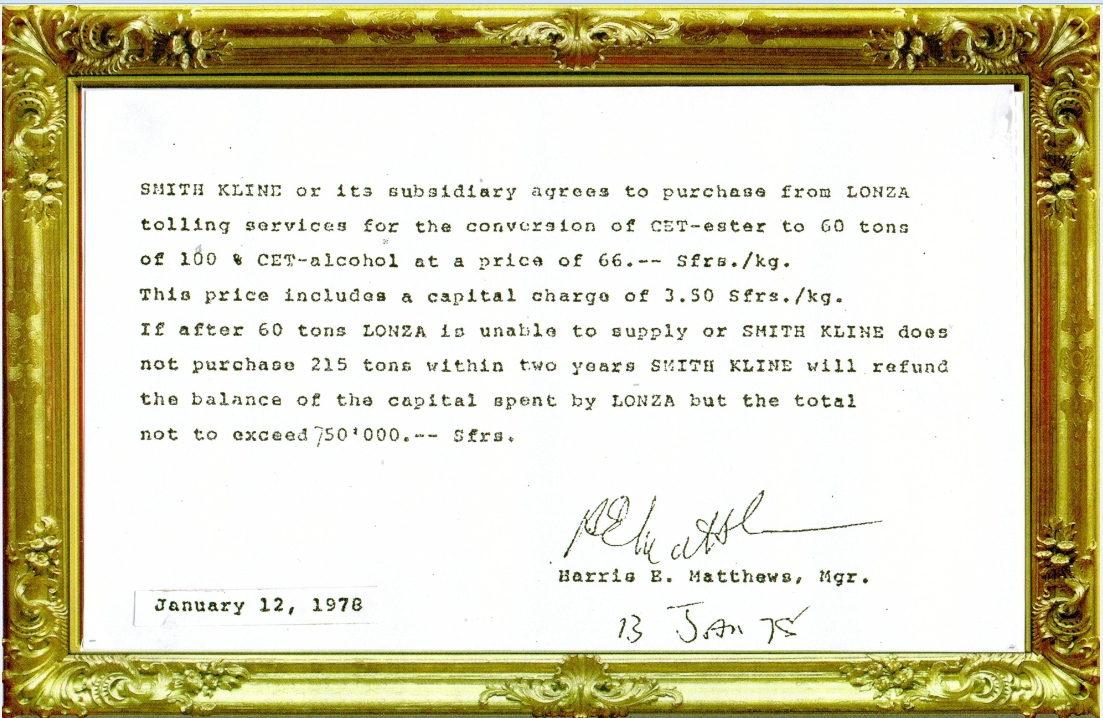
The beginning: supply contract between Smith Kline French and Lonza for cimetidine precursors

In subsequent years, the business developed and Lonza was the first fine chemical company to enter into a strategic partnership with SKF. In a similar way, Fine Organics, UK became the supplier of the thioethyl-N'-methyl-2-nitro-1,1-ethenediamine moiety of ranitidine, the second H2 receptor antagonist, marketed as Zantac by Glaxo. Other pharmaceutical and agrochemical companies gradually followed suit and started outsourcing the procurement of fine chemicals. For example, F.I.S., Italy, partnered with Roche, Switzerland for custom manufacturing precursors of the benzodiazepine class of tranquilizers, such as Librium (chlordiazepoxide HCl) and Valium (diazepam).

The growing complexity and potency of new pharmaceuticals and agrochemicals requiring production in multipurpose, instead of dedicated, plants and, more recently, the advent of biopharmaceuticals, has had a major impact on the demand for fine chemicals and the evolution of the fine chemical industry as a distinct entity. For many years, the life science industry continued considering captive production of the active ingredients of their drugs and agrochemicals as a core competency. Outsourcing was used only in exceptional cases, such as capacity shortfalls, processes requiring hazardous chemistry or new products, where uncertainties existed about the chance of a successful launch.

== Products ==
In terms of molecular structure, one distinguishes first between low-molecular-weight (LMW) and high-molecular-weight (HMW) products. The generally accepted threshold between LMW and HMW is a molecular weight of about 700 g/mol. LMW fine chemicals, also designated as small molecules, are produced by traditional chemical synthesis, by microorganisms (through fermentation or biotransformation), or by extraction from plants and animals. In the production of modern life science products, total synthesis from petrochemicals prevails. HMW products, or large molecules, are obtained mainly through biotechnology processes. Within LMWs, the N-heterocyclic compounds are the most important category; within HMWs, it is peptides and proteins.

=== Small molecules ===
As aromatic compounds have been mosely exhausted as building blocks for life science products, N-heterocyclic structures prevail nowadays. They are found in many natural products, such as chlorophyll, hemoglobin, and the vitamins biotin, folic acid, niacin (PP), pyridoxine (vitamin B_{6}), riboflavin (vitamin B_{2}), and thiamine (vitamin B_{1}). In synthetic life science products, N-heterocyclic moieties are widely used in both pharmaceuticals and agrochemicals. Thus, β-lactams are structural elements of penicillin and cephalosporin antibiotics and imidazoles are found both in modern herbicides, such Arsenal (imazapyr) and pharmaceuticals, such as the antiulcerants Tagamet (cimetidine. see above) and Nexium (omeprazole), the antimycotics Daktarin (miconazole), Fungarest (ketoconazole) and Travogen (isoconazole). Tetrazoles and tetrazolidines are pivotal parts of the "sartan" class of hypertensives, such as Candesartan cilexetil (candesartan), Avapro (irbesartan), Cozaar (losartan) and Diovan (valsartan).

Chemical Structure of Diovan (valsartan)

A vast array of pharmaceuticals and agrochemicals are based on pyrimidines, such as Vitamin B1 (thiamine), the sulfonamide antibiotics, e.g. Madribon (sulfadimethoxime) and – half a century later – the sulfonyl urea herbicides, e.g. Eagle (amidosulfuron) and Londax (bensulfuron-methyl). Benzodiazepine derivatives are the pivotal structural elements of breakthrough CNS drugs, such as Librium (chlordiazepoxide) and Valium (diazepam). Pyridine derivatives are found in both well-known Diquat and Chlorpyrifos herbicides, and in modern nicotinoid insecticides, such as Imidacloprid. Even modern pigments, such as diphenylpyrazolopyrazoles and quinacridones, and engineering plastics, such as polybenzimidazoles, polyimides, and triazine resins, exhibit an N-heterocyclic structure.

=== Big molecules ===
Big molecules, also called high molecular weight (HMW) molecules, are mostly oligomers or polymers of small molecules, or chains of amino acids. Thus, within pharmaceutical sciences, peptides, proteins and oligonucleotides constitute the major categories. Peptides and proteins are oligomers or polycondensates of amino acids linked together by a carboxamide group. The threshold between the two is at about 50 amino acids. Because of their unique biological functions, a significant and growing part of new drug discovery and development is focused on this class of biomolecules. Their biological functions are determined by the exact arrangement or sequence of different amino acids in their makeup. For the synthesis of peptides, four categories of fine chemicals, commonly referred to as peptide building blocks (PBBs), are key: amino acids (=starting materials), protected amino acids, peptide fragments and peptides themselves. Along the way, the molecular weights increase from about 10^{2} up to 10^{4} and the unit prices from about $100 up to $10^{5} per kilogram. However, only a small part of the total amino acid production is used for peptide synthesis. In fact, L-glutamic acid, L-methionine, L-aspartic acid and L-phenylalanine are used in large quantities as food and feed additives. About 50 peptide drugs are commercialized. The number of amino acids that make up a specific peptide varies widely. At the low end are the dipeptides. The most important drugs with a dipeptide (L-alanyl-L-proline) moiety are the "-pril" cardiovascular drugs, such as Alapril (lisinopril), Captoril (captopril), Novolac (imidapril) and Renitec (enalapril). The artificial sweetener Aspartame (N-L-α-Aspartyl-L-phenylalanine 1-methyl ester) is also a dipeptide. At the high end, there is the anticoagulant hirudin, MW ≈ 7000, which is composed of 65 amino acids.

Apart from pharmaceuticals, peptides are also used for diagnostics and vaccines. The total production volume (excluding Aspartame) of chemically synthesized, pure peptides is about 1,500 kg (3,300 lb) and sales approach $500 million on the active pharmaceutical (API) level and $10 billion on the finished drug level, respectively. The bulk of the production of peptide drugs, which also include the first generation anti-AIDS drugs, the "...navirs", is outsourced to a few specialized contract manufacturers, such as Bachem, Switzerland; Chengu GT Biochem, China; Chinese Peptide Company, China; Lonza, Switzerland, and Polypeptide, Denmark.

Proteins are "very high-molecular-weight" (MW > 100,000) organic compounds, consisting of amino acid sequences linked by peptide bonds. They are essential to the structure and function of all living cells and viruses and are among the most actively studied molecules in biochemistry. They can be made only by advanced biotechnological processes; primarily mammalian cell cultures. Monoclonal antibodies (mAb) prevail among human-made proteins. About a dozen of them are approved as pharmaceuticals. Important modern products are EPO (Binocrit and NeoRecormon), Enbrel (etanercerpt), Remicade (infliximab), MabThera/Rituxin (rituximab), and Herceptin (trastuzumab). PEGylation is a big step forward regarding administration of peptide and protein drugs. This method offers the two-fold advantage of substituting injection by oral administration and reducing the dosage, and therefore the cost, of the treatment. The pioneer company in this field is Prolong Pharmaceuticals which has developed a PEGylated erythropoietin (PEG-EPO).

Oligonucleotides are a third category of big molecules. They are oligomers of nucleotides, which in turn are composed of a five-carbon sugar (either ribose or desoxyribose), a nitrogenous base (either a pyrimidine or a purine) and 1–3 phosphate groups. The best known representative of a nucleotide is the coenzyme ATP (Adenosine triphosphate), MW 507.2. Oligonucleotides are chemically synthesized from protected phosphoramidites of natural or chemically modified nucleosides. The oligonucleotide chain assembly proceeds in the direction from 3'- to 5'-terminus by following a procedure referred to as a "synthetic cycle". Completion of a single synthetic cycle results in the addition of one nucleotide residue to the growing chain. The maximum length of synthetic oligonucleotides hardly exceeds 200 nucleotide components. From its current range of applications in basic research as well as in drug target validation, drug discovery, and therapeutic development, the potential use of oligonucleotides is foreseen in gene therapy (antisense drugs), disease prevention and agriculture.

Antibody-drug conjugates (ADC) constitute a combination between small and big molecules. The small molecule parts, up to four different APIs, are highly potent cytotoxic drugs. They are linked with a monoclonal antibody, a big molecule which is of little or no therapeutic value in itself, but extremely discriminating for its targets, the cancer cells. The first commercialized ADC was Pfizer's (formerly Wyeth) mylotarg (gemtuzumab ozogamicin). Examples of ADCs in phase III of development are Abbott's/Isis's alicaforsen and Eli Lilly's aprinocarsen.

== Technologies ==
Several key technologies are used for the production of fine chemicals, including:

- Chemical synthesis, either from petrochemical starting materials or from natural products extracts.
- Biotechnology, specifically biocatalysis (enzymatic methods) and biosynthesis (fermentation) for small molecules, and cell culture technology for big molecules.
- Extraction from animals, microorganisms, or plants; for example, isolation and purification is used for alkaloids, antibacterials (especially penicillins), and steroids.
- Hydrolysis of proteins, especially when combined with ion exchange chromatography, used, for instance, for amino acids.

Chemical synthesis and biotechnology are most frequently used, sometimes in combination.

=== Traditional chemical synthesis ===
A large toolbox of chemical reactions is available for each step of the synthesis of a fine chemical. The reactions have been developed on laboratory scale by academia over the last two centuries and subsequently adapted to industrial scale, such as the manufacture of dyestuffs & pigments.

Methods of Molecular Transformations describes 26,000 organic synthetic methods, about 10% of which are currently used on an industrial scale for fine chemicals production. Amination, condensation, esterification, Friedel–Crafts, Grignard, halogenation (especially chlorination), hydrogenation, and reduction (both catalytic and chemical) are the most frequently mentioned techniques on the websites of individual companies. Optically active cyanohydrins, cyclopolymerization, ionic liquids, nitrones, oligonucleotides, peptide (both liquid- and solid-phase), electrochemical reactions (like perfluorination) and steroid synthesis are promoted by only a limited number of companies. With the exception of some stereospecific reactions, particularly biotechnology, mastering these technologies does not represent a distinct competitive advantage. Most reactions can be carried out in standard multipurpose plants. The very versatile organometallic reactions (e.g., conversions with lithium aluminum hydride, boronic acids) may require temperatures as low as −100 °C (−148 °F), which can be achieved only in special cryogenic reaction units, either by using liquefied nitrogen as coolant or by installing a low-temperature unit. Other reaction-specific equipment, such as filters for the separation of catalysts, ozone or phosgene generators, can be purchased in many different sizes. The installation of special equipment generally is not a critical path on the overall project for developing an industrial-scale process of a new molecule.

Since the mid-1990s, the commercial importance of single-enantiomer fine chemicals has increased steadily. They constitute about half of both existing and developmental drug APIs. In this context, the ability to synthesize chiral molecules has become an important competency. Two types of processes are used: physical separation of the enantiomers and stereo specific synthesis using chiral catalysts. Among the latter, enzymes and synthetic BINAP (2,2'–Bis(diphenylphosphino)–1,1'–binaphthyl) types are used most frequently. Large volume (> 103 mtpa) processes using chiral catalysts include the manufacture of the perfume ingredient l-Menthol, as well as herbicides, such as Syngenta's Dual (metolachlor) and BASF's Outlook (dimethenamid-P). Examples of originator drugs, which apply asymmetric technology, are AstraZeneca's Nexium (esomeprazole) and Merck & Co's Januvia (sitagliptin). The physical separation of chiral mixtures and purification of the desired enantiomer can be achieved either by classical fractional crystallization (which has an image of being "low-tech" but is still widely used), carried out using standard multipurpose equipment or by various types of chromatographical separation, such as standard column, simulated moving-bed (SMB) or supercritical fluid (SCF) techniques.

For peptides, three main types of methods are used: chemical synthesis, extraction from natural substances, and biosynthesis. Chemical synthesis is used for smaller peptides made of up to 30–40 amino acids. There is an important difference between "liquid phase" and "solid phase" synthesis. In the latter, reagents are incorporated in a resin that is contained in a reactor or column. The synthesis sequence starts by attaching the first amino acid to the reactive group of the resin and then adds the remaining amino acids, one after the other. In order to ascertain a full selectivity, the amino groups have to be protected in advance. Most developmental peptides are synthesized by this method, which lends itself to automation. As the intermediate products resulting from individual synthetic steps cannot be purified, a selectivity of effectively 100% is essential for the synthesis of larger-peptide molecules. Even at a selectivity of 99% per reaction step, the purity will drop to less than 75% for a decapeptide (30 steps). Therefore, for industrial quantities of peptides not more than 10–15 amino acids, peptides can be made using the solid-phase method. For laboratory quantities, up to 40 are possible. To prepare larger peptides, individual fragments are first produced and purified, and then combined to the final molecule by liquid phase synthesis. Thus, for the production of Roche's anti-AIDS drug Fuzeon (enfuvirtide), three fragments of 10–12 amino acids are first made by solid-phase synthesis and then linked together by liquid-phase synthesis. The preparation of the whole 35 amino acid peptide requires more than 130 individual steps.

Microreactor Technology (MRT), used for process intensification, is a relatively new tool that is being developed at several universities, as well as fine chemical companies, such as Bayer Technology Services, Germany; Clariant, Switzerland; Evonik-Degussa, Germany; DSM, The Netherlands; Lonza, Switzerland; PCAS, France; and Sigma-Aldrich, US. The lattermost company produces about 50 fine chemicals up to multi-kilogram quantities in microreactors. From a technological point of view, MRT, or continuous flow reactors, represents the first breakthrough development in reactor design since the introduction of the stirred-tank reactor, which was used by Perkin & Sons when they established a factory on the banks of what was then the Grand Junction Canal in London in 1857, in order to produce mauveïne, the first-ever synthetic purple dye. For a comprehensive coverage of the subject see Micro Process Engineering. Reactions that have worked in microreactors include aromatics oxidations, diazomethane conversions, Grignards, halogenations, hydrogenations, nitrations, and Suzuki couplings. According to experts in the field, 70% of all chemical reactions could be done in microreactors; however, only 10-15% are economically justified.

With the exception of some stereospecific reactions, particularly biotechnology, mastering these technologies does not represent a distinct competitive advantage. Most reactions can be carried out in standard multipurpose plants. Reaction-specific equipment, such as ozone or phosgene generators, is readily available. The installation is not generally a critical path on the overall project for developing an industrial-scale process of a new molecule.

Whereas the overall demand for outsourced pharmaceutical fine chemicals is expected to increase moderately, the estimated annual growth rates for the above-mentioned niche technologies are much higher. Microreactors, and the SMB separation technology, are expected to grow at a rate of 50–100% per year. The total size of the accessible market typically does not exceed a few hundred tons per year at best.

=== Biotechnology ===
Industrial biotechnology, also called "white biotechnology", is increasingly impacting the chemical industry, enabling both the conversion of renewable resources, such as sugar or vegetable oils, and the more efficient transformation of conventional raw materials into a wide range of commodities (such as cellulose, ethanol and succinic acid), fine chemicals (such as 6-aminopenicillanic acid), and specialties (such as food and feed additives). As opposed to green and red biotechnology, which relate to agriculture and medicine, respectively, white biotechnology seeks to improve the economic and sustainable production of existing products, and provide access to new products, especially biopharmaceuticals. It is expected that revenues from white biotechnology will account for 10%, or $250 billion, of the global chemical market of $2,500 billion by 2013. In ten to 15 years, it is expected that most amino acids and vitamins and many specialty chemicals will be produced by means of biotechnology. Three very different process technologies — biocatalysis, biosynthesis (microbial fermentation), and cell cultures — are used.

Biocatalysis, also known as biotransformation or bioconversion, makes use of natural or modified isolated enzymes, enzyme extracts, or whole-cell systems for enhancing the production of small molecules. It has much to offer compared to traditional organic synthesis. The syntheses are shorter, less energy intensive and generate less waste, and are thus both environmentally and economically more attractive. About 2/3 of chiral products produced on large industrial scale are already made using biocatalysis. In the manufacture of fine chemicals, enzymes represent the single most important technology for radical cost reductions. This is particularly the case in the synthesis of molecules with chiral centres. Here, it is possible to substitute the formation of a salt with a chiral compound, such as (+)-α-phenylethylamine, crystallization, salt breaking and recycling of the chiral auxiliary, resulting in a theoretical yield of not more than 50%, with a one step, high yield reaction under mild conditions that results in a product with a very high enantiomeric excess (ee). An example is AstraZeneca's blockbuster drug Crestor (rosuvastatin).

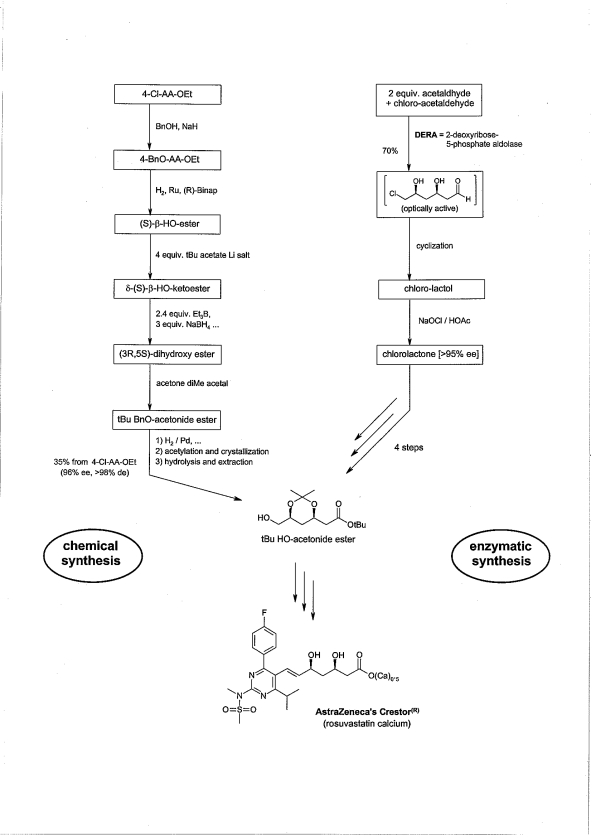
Chemical / Enzymatic Synthesis of Crestor (rosuvastatin)

Further examples of modern drugs where enzymes are used in the synthesis include Pfizer's Lipitor (atorvastatin), where the pivotal intermediate R-3-Hydroxy-4-cyanobutyrate is now made with a nitrilase, and Merck & Co.'s Singulair (montelukast), where the reduction of a ketone to S-alcohol, which had required stoichiometric amounts of expensive and moisture sensitive "(-)-DIP chloride" is now replaced by a ketoreductase enzyme catalyst step. Similar switches from chemical steps to enzymatic ones have also been achieved in steroid synthesis. Thus, it has been possible to reduce the number of steps required for the synthesis of dexamethasone from bile from 28 to 15. Enzymes differ from chemical catalysts, particularly with regard to stereoselectivity, regioselectivity, and chemoselectivity. They can also be modified ("reshuffled") for specific reactions, for use in chemical synthesis. Immobilized enzymes are fixed on solid supports, and can be recovered by filtration after completion of the reaction. Conventional plant equipment can be used with no, or only modest, adaptations. The International Union of Biochemistry and Molecular Biology (IUBMB) has developed a classification for enzymes. The main categories are oxidoreductases, transferases, hydrolases, lipases (subcategory), lyases, isomerases and ligases. Companies specializing in making enzymes include Novozymes and Danisco (Genencor). Codexis is the leader in modifying enzymes to specific chemical reactions. The highest-volume chemicals made by biocatalysis are bio-ethanol (70 million metric tons), high-fructose corn syrup (2 million metric tons), acrylamide, 6-aminopenicillanic acid (APA), L-lysine and other amino acids, citric acid and niacinamide (all more than 10,000 metric tons).

Biosynthesis, the conversion of organic materials into fine chemicals by microorganisms, is used for the production of both small molecules (using enzymes in whole cell systems) and less complex, non-glycosylated big molecules, including peptides and simpler proteins. The technology has been used for 10,000 years to produce food products, like alcoholic beverages, cheese, yogurt, and vinegar. In contrast to biocatalysis, a biosynthetic process does not depend on chemicals as starting materials, but only on cheap natural feedstock, such as glucose, to serve as nutrient for the cells. The enzyme systems triggered in the particular microorganism strain lead to the excretion of the desired product into the medium, or, in the case of HMW peptides and proteins, to the accumulation within so-called inclusion bodies in the cells. The key elements of fermentation development are strain selection and optimization, as well as media and process development. Dedicated plants are used for large-scale industrial production. As the volume productivity is low, the bioreactors, called fermenters, are large, with volumes that can exceed 250 m^{3} (8,828.67 cubic feet). Product isolation was previously based on large-volume extraction of the medium containing the product. Modern isolation and membrane technologies, like reverse osmosis, ultra- and nano-filtration and affinity chromatography can help to remove salts and by-products, and concentrate the solution efficiently and in an environmentally friendly manner under mild conditions. The final purification is often achieved by conventional chemical crystallization processes. In contrast to the isolation of small molecules, the isolation and purification of microbial proteins is tedious and often involves a number of expensive large-scale chromatographic operations. Examples of large-volume LMW products made by modern industrial microbial biosynthetic processes are monosodium glutamate (MSG), vitamin B2 (riboflavin), and vitamin C (ascorbic acid). In vitamin B2, riboflavin, the original six- to eight-step synthetic process starting from barbituric acid has been substituted completely by a microbial one-step process, allowing a 95% waste reduction and an approximately 50% manufacturing cost reduction. In ascorbic acid, the five-step process (yield ≈ 85%) starting from D-glucose, originally invented by Tadeus Reichstein in 1933, is being gradually substituted by a more straightforward fermentative process with 2-ketogluconic acid as pivotal intermediate. After the discovery of penicillin in 1928 by Sir Alexander Fleming from colonies of the bacterium Staphylococcus aureus, it took more than a decade before a powdery form of the medicine was developed. Since then, many more antibiotics and other secondary metabolites have been isolated and manufactured by microbial fermentation on a large scale. Some important antibiotics, other than penicillin, are cephalosporins, azithromycin, bacitracin, gentamicin, rifamycin, streptomycin, tetracycline, and vancomycin.

Animal or plant cells, removed from tissues, will continue to grow if cultivated under the appropriate nutrients and conditions. When carried out outside the natural habitat, the process is called cell culture. Mammalian cell culture fermentation, also known as recombinant DNA technology, is used mainly for the production of complex big molecule therapeutic proteins, or biopharmaceuticals. The first products made were interferon (discovered in 1957), insulin, and somatropin. Commonly used cell lines are Chinese hamster ovary (CHO) cells and plant cell cultures. The production volumes are very small. They exceed 100 kg (220 lb) per year for only three products: Rituxan (Roche-Genentech), Enbrel (Amgen and Merck & Co.), and Remicade (Johnson & Johnson). Fine chemical production by mammalian cell culture is a much more demanding operation than conventional biocatalysis and biosynthesis. The bioreactor batch requires more stringent controls of operating parameters, since mammalian cells are heat and shear sensitive. In addition, the growth rate of mammalian cells is very slow, lasting from days to several months. While there are substantial differences between microbial and mammalian technologies (the volume / value relationships are $10/kg and 100 tonnes for microbial and $1,000,000/kg and 10 kilograms for mammalian technology; the cycle times are 2–4 and 10–20 days, respectively), they are even more pronounced between mammalian and synthetic chemical technology (see Table 1).

Table 1: Key Characteristics of Biotechnological and Chemical API Manufacturing (all figures are indicative only)
		Mammalian cell technology	Chemical technology
Worldwide reactor volume		≈ 3000 m^{3} (fermenters)	≈ 80,000 m^{3}
Investment per m^{3} reactor volume		≈ $5 million	≈ $500,000
Production per m^{3} reactor volume and year		several 10 kg	several 1000 kg
Sales per m^{3} reactor volume and year		≈ $5 – 10 million	≈ $250,000 - 500,000
Value of 1 batch		≈ $5 million (20,000 liter fermenter)	≈ $500,000
Product concentration in reaction mixture		≈ 2 - 6 (-10) g / Liter	≈ 100 g / Liter (10%)
Typical reaction time		≈ 20 days	≈ 6 hours
Process development time		≈ 3 years (one step)	2 – 3 months per step
Capacity expansion projects		many, doubling of actual capacity	few, mainly in Far East
Governing rules		cGMP, BLA [Biological License Application (product specific)]	cGMP, ISO 14000
Scale-up factor (1st lab process to industrial scale)		≈ 10^{9} (μg → 1 ton)	≈ 10^{6} (10 g → 10 tons)
Plant construction time		4 – 6 years	2 – 3 years
share of outsourcing	early stage	55%	25% of chemical production
share of outsourcing	commercial	20%	45% of chemical production

The mammalian cell production process, as used for most biopharmaceuticals, is divided into the four main steps: (1) Cultivation, or the reproduction of the cells; (2) Fermentation, or the actual production of the protein, typically in 10,000 Liter bioreactors; (3) Purification, or the separation of the cells from the culture medium and purification, mostly by chromatography; (4) Formulation, or the conversion of the sensitive proteins to a stable form. All steps are fully automated. The low productivity of the animal culture makes the technology expensive and vulnerable to contamination, as a small amount of bacteria would soon outgrow a larger population of animal cells. Its main disadvantages are low volume productivity and the animal provenance. It is conceivable that other technologies, particularly plant cell production, will gain importance in future. Given the fundamental differences between the two process technologies, plants for mammalian cell culture technologies have to be built ex novo.

The pros and cons of an involvement of a fine chemical company in cell culture technology are listed below:

Pros:

- Strong growth of demand: today, biopharmaceuticals account for about $55–$80 billion, or 15% of the total pharmaceutical market. They are growing by 15% per year, three times faster than LMW drugs, and are expected to pass the $150 billion per year threshold by 2015. Whereas just one out of the world's top ten drugs was a biopharmaceutical in 2001, the number went up to five in 2010 and is expected to increase further to eight by 2016 (see Table 2).

Table 2: Top Ten Drugs by 2016
Proprietary name		Generic Name	Company
Small Molecular Weight (conventional chemical)
1	Crestor	rosuvastatin	AstraZeneca
2	Advair/Seretide	Salmeterol /fluticasone	GlaxoSmithKline
High Molecular Weight (biopharmaceuticals)
1	Humira	adalimumab	AbbVie (Before: Abbott)
2	Enbrel	etanecept	Amgen
3	Prolia	denosumab	Amgen
4	Rituxan	rituximab	Roche/Biogen Idec
5	Avastatin	bevacizumab	Roche
6	Herceptin	trastuzumab	Roche
7	Remicade	infliximab	J&J/Merck & Co.
8	Lantus	insulin glargine	Sanofi-Aventis

- The likelihood of developing a new biopharmaceutical successfully is significantly greater than in traditional drug development. 25% of biopharmaceuticals that enter Phase I of the regulatory process eventually are granted approval. The corresponding figure for conventional drugs is less than 6%.
- The traditionally large share of outsourcing.
- Small number of custom manufacturers with industrial-scale manufacturing capabilities in this demanding technology. In the Western hemisphere, primarily Boehringer-Ingelheim of Germany and Lonza of Switzerland; in the Eastern hemisphere, Nicholas Piramal of India (through the acquisition of a former Avecia operation) and the joint ventures between AutekBio and Beijing E-Town Harvest International in China and between Biocon in India and Celltrion in South Korea.
- Same customer category: life science, especially the pharmaceutical industry.
- Similar business types: custom manufacturing of proprietary drugs; opportunities for generic versions, called biosimilars.
- Similar regulatory environment: FDA regulations, especially GMP.
- Existing infrastructure (utilities, etc.) can be used.

Cons:

- High entry barriers because of demanding technology: the construction of a large-scale plant for the production of biopharmaceuticals by cell culture fermentation costs around $500 million and takes four to six years.
- As the specifications of the plant and process types for biopharmaceuticals differ substantially from traditional chemical synthesis, they cannot be produced in conventional multipurpose fine chemical plants.
- High financial exposure, due to high capital intensity (as massive investments are needed at a time when chances of success are still very low) and risk of batch failures (contamination).
- Unlike the biopharmaceutical start-ups, the emerging big biopharmaceutical companies are adopting the same opportunistic outsourcing policy as larger pharmaceutical companies. Thus, Amgen, Biogen Idec, Eli Lilly, Johnson & Johnson (J&J), Medimmune, Novartis, Roche-Genentech and Pfizer are investing heavily in in-house manufacturing capacity. With three plants in the US, two in Japan and one each in Germany and Switzerland, Roche has the largest production capacity.
- New developments in expression systems for mammalian and plant cell technology could reduce capacity requirements substantially: the titer in large-scale mammalian production, 2–3 grams/liter, is expected to double to 5–7 by 2015 go up to 10 by 2020. Furthermore, the widespread application of "single-use disposable bioprocessing technology" advantageously substitutes for stainless steel production trains, at least for short production campaigns.
- New transgenic production systems are emerging, such as transgenic moss, lemna, fungal or yeast expression systems, transgenic animals and plants such as tobacco plants, which possess the potential to become economically and industrially successful.
- Legislation and regulation of biotechnology is not well defined yet and leads to differences in interpretation and other uncertainties. In the US, legislation is not yet in place for biosimilars, the generic counterpart of generics in small molecule pharmaceuticals.

The inherent risks of the mammalian cell technology led several companies to opt out of mammalian cell technology or to substantially reduce their stake. Examples are Cambrex and Dow Pharma in the US, Avecia, DSM and Siegfried in Europe and WuXi App Tech in China. In conclusion, biocatalysis should be, or become, part of the technology toolbox of any fine chemical company. Mammalian cell culture fermentation, on the other hand, should be considered only by large fine chemical companies with a full war chest and a long-term strategic orientation.

== The industry ==
Within the chemical universe, the fine chemical industry is positioned between the commodity, their suppliers, and specialty chemical industries, their customers. Depending on the services offered, there are two types of fine chemical companies. Fine chemical companies are active in industrial scale production, both of standard and exclusive products.

Fine chemical companies tend to fall into one of three categories: producers are referred to as Custom Manufacturing Organizations (CMOs); Contract Research Organizations (CROs)' main assets are their research laboratories; and CRAMS (Contract Research and Manufacturing Organizations are hybrids between the two.

=== Fine Chemical/Custom Manufacturing Companies ===
Fine chemical/Custom Manufacturing companies, in a narrow sense, are active in process scale up, pilot plant (trial) production, industrial-scale exclusive and non-exclusive manufacture and marketing. Their product portfolios comprise exclusive products, produced by custom manufacturing, as a main activity, as well as non-exclusive products, such as API-for Generics, and standard products. Characteristics are high asset intensity, batch production in campaigns in multipurpose plants, above-industry-average R&D expenditures and close, multi-level and multi-functional relationships with industrial customers. The industry is very fragmented. 2000 – 3000 fine chemical companies exist globally, extending from small, "garage-type" outfits in China making just one product, all the way to the big, diversified enterprises, resp. units. The main reason for the fragmentation is the lack of economy of scale (see below).

The industry is subject to a high degree of regulation, even more so than the chemical industry as a whole, particularly if pharmaceutical fine chemical production is involved. The most important regulatory authorities are the Food and Drug Administration (FDA) in the US, and the State Food & Drug Administration (SFDA) in China. Their main responsibilities include formulating comprehensive supervision policies ("Good Manufacturing Practice"), controlling drug implementation and registration, drawing up criteria for marketing authorization and formulating national essential medicines lists. The European authorities are the European Medicines Agency (EMEA), which is manly responsible for the scientific evaluation of medicines developed by pharmaceutical companies for use in the European Union, and enforcing the Registration, Evaluation, Authorization and Restriction of Chemicals (REACH) regulation. The U.S. Pharmacopeia codifies quality standards for Active Pharmaceutical Ingredients. As these standards are observed worldwide, they also contribute to the emergence of a uniform worldwide set-up of the top tier fine chemical companies. In terms of size, resources, and complexity of the chemical process technologies mastered, the fine chemical companies can be broadly divided into three segments, each of them accounting for approximately the same turnover of about $10 billion. The top tier, about twenty companies, has sales in excess of $250 million per year (see Table 3). Most are not pure players but divisions or business units of large, multinational companies. Their share varies between one percent or less for BASF and Pfizer, all the way to 100% for Cambrex, USA; Divi's Laboratories, India, and F.I.S., Italy. All have extensive resources in terms of chemists and other specialists, plants, process knowledge, backwards integration, international presence, etc.

Table 3: Leading Fine Chemical Companies (resp. Units)
	Company	Location	Sales 2009 ($ million)	F.C. unit	Sales 2009 ($ million)	Remarks
1	Lonza	Switz.	2600	Custom. Manuf.	1370	HMW/LMW~55/45
2	Boehringer-Ingelheim	Germany	18,300	Fine Chem.^{1}	950	HMW/LMW=84/16
3	DSM	The Netherlands	11,300	Fine Chem.^{1}	850^{aE}
4	Sumitomo Chemical	Japan	17,420	Fine Chem.^{1}	730	incl. some polymer additives
5	Merck KGaA	Germany	11,200	Life Science Solutions	580	#1 in liquid crystals
6	Sigma-Aldrich	USA	2148	SAFC	570^{E}
7	BASF	Germany	73,000	Fine Chem.^{1}	550^{2E}	incl. some excipients
8	CSPC Shijiazhuang Pharmaceutical Group	China	1500	Fine Chem.^{1}	550^{E}	API-for-Generics, e.g. HIV / AIDS, sartans
9	Lanxess	Germany	7280	Saltigo	550^{E}	a.o. agrochemicals
10	Albemarle	USA	2005	Fine Chem.^{1}	500^{2}	a.o. ibuprofen
Total Top Ten					~7200
^{1} as per author's definition^{2} part of the sales do not derive from fine chemicals, e.g., generics, catalysts, excipients^{E} Author's estimate (non figures published by the company) HMW, high molecular weight, LMW, low molecular weight fine chemicals 11.-20.: Jubilant Organosys. India,800^{E}/470; Dr. Reddy's, India, 1370/370; Evonik-Degussa, Germany, 18,900/350^{E}; Johnson Matthey, UK 12,500/350; Aurobinda, India 665/340; NCPC, North China Pharmaceutical, China, 718/300^{E}; Divi's Laboratories, India, 250/250; Pfizer, US, 50,000/250^{E}; Cambrex, US, 235/235; F.I.S., Italy, 230/230 Σ11-20 ~ 2,900 million; ΣΣ1-20 ~ $10,000 million note: The first number refers to the total sales, the second one to the fine chemical sales. Both are in $ million

The combined revenues of the top 20 fine chemical companies amounted to $10 billion in 2009, representing about 30% of the whole industry. The leading companies are typically divisions of large, diversified chemical companies. In terms of geography, 9 of the top 20 are located in Europe, which is recognized as the cradle of the fine chemical industry. This is the case for the world's #1 company, Lonza, which is headquartered in Basel, Switzerland. Custom manufacturing prevails in northern Europe; the manufacture of active substances for generics, in southern Europe. The second largest geographic area is Asia, housing 7 of the top 20. With 4 large companies, the US ranks last.

Whereas the European and U.S. pharma industry constitutes the main customer base for most fine chemical companies, some have a significant share of products and services for the agrochemical industry. Examples are Archimica, CABB, Saltigo (all Germany); DSM, The Netherlands; and Hikal, India. Several large pharmaceutical companies market fine chemicals as subsidiary activity to their production for captive use, including Abbott, USA; Bayer Schering Pharma, Boehringer-Ingelheim, Germany; Daiichi-Sankyo (after the takeover of Ranbaxy), Japan; Johnson & Johnson, USA; Merck KGaA, Germany; and Pfizer (formerly Upjohn), US. Large fine chemical companies, in contrast to mid-sized and small ones, are characterized by:

- A lack of economy of size: as most fine chemicals are produced in quantities of less than a few 10 tons per year in multipurpose plants, there is little or no economy of size. The reactor trains of these plants are similar throughout the industry. Regardless of the size of the companies, their main constituents, the reaction vessels, have a median size of 4–6 m^{3} (140–210 cubic feet). Various products are made throughout a year in campaigns. Therefore, the unit cost per m^{3} per hour rarely varies with the size of the company.
- A dichotomy between ownership and management: the company's shares are listed on stock exchanges, and their performance is scrutinized by the financial community. Postponement of a single important shipment can affect a quarterly result. In the small and mid-sized companies, the owners are typically the major shareholders, often members of the same family. Their shares are not traded publicly and fluctuations in their financial performance are more easily coped with.
- Complicated business processes: flexibility and responsiveness are in jeopardy. Customer complaints, for instance, are difficult to resolve in a straightforward manner.
- A heterogeneous portfolio of small companies, accumulated over time through M&A activities. The key functions, such as production, R&D, and M&S, are located on different sites, often in different countries.
- Cohabitation with other units.

A comprehensive list of about 1400 fine chemical companies (including traders) can be found in the "event catalogue" of the CPhI exhibition.

The second tier consists of several dozens of midsized companies, with sales in the range of $100–$250 million per year. Their portfolios comprise both custom manufacturing and API-for-generics. They include both independents and subsidiaries of major companies. A number of these companies are privately owned and have grown mainly by reinvesting the profits. Examples are Bachem, Switzerland; Dishman, India; F.I.S. and Poli Industria Chimica, Italy; Hikal, India, and Hovione, Portugal. Customers prefer to do business with mid-sized companies, because communications are easier — they typically deal directly with the decision maker — and they can better leverage their purchasing power.

The third tier includes thousands of small independents, with sales below $100 million per year. Most of them are located in Asia. They often specialize in niche technologies. The minimum economical size of a fine chemical company depends on the availability of infrastructure. If a company is located in an industrial park, where analytical services, utilities, safety, health, and environmental (SHE) services, and warehousing are readily available, there is practically no lower limit. New fine chemical plants have appeared mostly in Far East countries over the past few years. Their annual turnover rate rarely exceeds $25 million.

All big and medium-size fine chemical companies have cGMP-compliant plants that are suitable for the production of pharmaceutical fine chemicals. With the exception of biopharmaceuticals, which are manufactured by only a few selected fine chemical companies, the technology toolboxes of all these companies are similar. This means that they can carry out practically all types of chemical reactions. They differentiate on the basis of the breadth and quality of the service offering.

=== Contract research organizations ===
Contract research organizations (CROs) provide services to the life science industries along product development. There are more than 2000 CROs operating worldwide, representing revenues of more than $20 billion. There is a key difference between "Product" and "Patient" CROs. Whereas the production sites of CMOs are multipurpose plants, allowing for the production of tens to hundreds of tons of fine chemicals, the work places of patient CROs are the test persons for the clinical trials, and the work places of product CROs are the laboratory benches. Major customers for CRO services are the large global pharmaceutical companies. Half a dozen companies (Pfizer, GlaxoSmithKline, Sanofi-Aventis, AstraZeneca, Johnson & Johnson, and Merck & Co.) alone absorb about one third of all CRO spending. Similarly to CMOs, biotech start-up CROS, with their dichotomy between ambitious drug development programs and limited resources, are the second most promising prospects.

Product CROs primarily provide sample preparation, process research and development services. Pilot plants, which produce 100 kg quantities, are combinations of development CROs and CMOs, and ae part of the arsenal of both types of enterprise. Tere are more 100 Product CROs. Most of them are privately held and have revenues of $10–$20 million per year or less, adding up to a total business in the range of $1.5-$2 billion. Examples include:

- In North America: Alphora, Delmar and NAEJA, all Canada. AMRI, Aptuit, Cambridge Major, ChemBridge, Innocentive, Irix Pharmaceuticals and PharmEco, all USA.
- In Europe: Carbogen-Amcis, Switzerland; Chemcomm, Germany; ChemDiv, Russia; Clauson-Kaas, Denmark; Enamine Ltd, Ukraine; Girindus, Germany; Nerviano Medical Sciences, Italy; Recipharm, Sweden; Serichim, Italy; Solvias, Switzerland, Netherlands.
- In Asia: BioDuro, Medicilon, Pharmaron and WuXi AppTec, all China; Acoris, Aptuit Laurus, Biocon/Syngene, Chembiotek, Chempartner and ProCitius, all India; NARD Institute and Riken, both Japan.

The business of CROs is usually done through a "pay for service" arrangement. Unlike manufacturing companies, invoicing of CROs is not based on unit product price, but on full-time equivalents (FTEs), or the cost of a scientist working one year on a given customer assignment. Companies offering both contract research and manufacturing services (CRAMS) combine the activities of CROs and CMOs. Their history is either a forward integration of a CRO, which adds industrial scale capabilities, or backwards integration of a CMO. As there are only limited synergies (>90% of the projects end at the sample preparation stage), it is questionable if one-stop shops really fulfil a need. Large fine chemical companies consider the preparation of samples more as marketing tool (and expense) rather than a profit contributor.

The offerings of Patient CROs (Clinical CROs) comprise more than 30 tasks addressing the clinical part of pharmaceutical development at the interface between drugs, physicians, hospitals, and patients, such as the clinical development and selection of lead new drug compounds. As clinical trials represent the largest expense in pharmaceutical research, the market for Patient CROs is larger than for their product counterparts. Thus, the sales of the top tier firms, such as Charles River Laboratories, Fortrea, Parexel, PPD, Quintiles Transnational, all USA, and TCG Lifescience, India, are in the $1–$2 billion range, whereas the largest Product CROs have revenues of a few 100 million dollars.

== Research and development ==
The overall emphasis of fine chemical R&D is more on development than on research. The main tasks are (1) designing, respectively duplicating and adapting in case of custom manufacture, and developing laboratory procedures for new products or processes; (2) transferring the processes from the laboratory via pilot plant to the industrial scale (the scale up factor from a 10g sample to a 1-ton batch is 100,000); and (3) optimizing existing processes. At all times during this course of action, the four critical constraints — economics, timing, safety, and ecology and sustainability — must be kept in mind. R&D expenditures in the fine chemical industry are higher than in the commodities industry. They represent around 5–10% of sales, versus 2–5% in commodities. On the business side, product innovation must proceed at a more rapid pace, because lifecycles of fine chemicals are shorter than those of commodities. Therefore, there is an ongoing need for substitution of obsolete products. On the technical side, the higher complexity of the products and the more stringent regulatory requirements absorb more resources. Many economic and technical parameters have been proposed to enable a meaningful assessment of single projects and project portfolios. Examples are attractiveness, strategic fit, innovation, gross/net present value, expected profits, R&D expenditures, development stage, probability of success, technology fit, potential conflicts with other activities of the company and realization time. Most of these parameters cannot be determined quantitatively, at least during the early phases of a project. The best way to take advantage of a project portfolio is to develop and use it in an iterative way. By comparing the entries at regular intervals, for instance, every 3 months, the directions that the projects take can be visualized. If a negative trend persists with one particular project, the project should be put on the watch list.

=== Objectives ===
R&D has to manage literature and patent research in order to deliver the requested services. Provisions have to be made for a periodic examination of all acquired research results, in order to safeguard Intellectual Property Rights (IPR) and determine whether patent applications are indicated. Patent research is particularly important for evaluation of the feasibility of taking up R&D for new APIs-for-generics.

Process research has to design new synthetic routes and sequences. Two approaches are feasible. For simple molecules, the "bottom-up" approach is the method of choice. The researcher converts a commercially available starting material and sequentially adds more reagents until the target molecule is synthesized. For more complex molecules, a "top-down" approach, also known as retro synthesis, or de-construction, is chosen. Key fragments of the target molecule are first identified, then synthesized individually, and finally combined to form the desired molecule through convergent synthesis.

Process development focuses on the design of new, efficient, stable, safe, and scalable synthetic routes to a target fine chemical. It represents an essential link between process research and commercial production. The resulting "base process" description provides the necessary data for the determination of preliminary raw material and product specifications, the manufacture of semi commercial quantities in the pilot plant, the assessment of the ecological impact, the regulatory submissions and technology transfer to manufacture at industrial scale, and an estimate of the manufacturing costs in an industrial-scale plant. If the base process is provided by the customer as part of the technology transfer, process research has to optimize it so that it can be transferred to the bench-scale laboratory or pilot plant. Furthermore, it has to be adapted to the specific characteristics of available production trains.

Another task is the scaling of development processes. Depending on the volume requirements, three different types of equipment are used for process research, development and optimization: bench-scale laboratories for gram to 100 gram, kilo-labs for kg to 10 kg and pilot plants for 100 kg to ton quantities. Particularities of laboratory processes that have to be eliminated include the use of large numbers of unit operations, dilute reaction mixtures, vast quantities of solvents for extraction, evaporation to dryness, and drying of solutions with hygroscopic salts. Although modern reaction calorimeters may foresee the effects of these different conditions to a certain extent, a direct transfer of a process from the laboratory to the industrial scale is not recommended, because of the inherent safety, environmental, and economic risks. In development, the viability of the process on a semi-commercial scale has to be demonstrated. Trial quantities of the new fine chemical have to be manufactured for market development, clinical tests, and other requirements. The necessary data has to be generated in order to enable the engineering department to plan the modifications of the industrial-scale plant and in order to calculate production costs for the expected large-volume requirements. Both equipment and plant layout of the pilot plant reflect those of an industrial multipurpose plant, except for the size of reaction vessels (bench-scale laboratory ~10–60 liters; pilot plant ~100–2500 liters) and the degree of process automation. Before the process is ready for transfer to the industrial-scale plant, the following activities have to be completed: adaptation of the laboratory process to the constraints of a pilot plant, hazard and operability (HAZOP) analysis, and execution of demonstration batches. The main differences between laboratory synthesis and industrial scale production are shown in Table 4.

Table 4: Laboratory Synthesis vs. Industrial Scale Process
Task	Laboratory synthesis	Industrial scale process
Operator	Laboratory chemist	Chemical engineer
Economy	Yield	Throughput (kg/m^{3}/hour)
Units	G, mL, mol; min. hours	Kg, ton, hours, shift
Equipment	Glass flask	Stainless steel, glass lined
Process control	Manual	Automatic [reaction vessel]
Critical path	Reaction time	Heating / cooling
Liquid handling	Pouring	Pumping
Liquid / solid sep.	Filtration	Centrifugation

In case of cGMP fine chemicals, process validation is also required. This consists of the three elements: process design, process qualification and continued process verification.

Once a new chemical process has been introduced successfully on an industrial scale, process optimization is called upon to improve the economics. As a rule of thumb, it should be attempted to reduce the costs of goods sold (COGS) by 10-20%, every time the yearly production quantity has doubled. The task extends from fine tuning the currently used synthetic method all the way to the search for an entirely different second generation process. Specific provisions include the increase of overall yield, the reduction of the number of steps, raw material cost, solvent, catalyst, enzyme consumption, environmental impact.

=== Project management ===
There are two main sources of new research projects, namely ideas originating from the researchers themselves ("supply push") and those coming from customers ("demand pull"). Ideas for new processes typically originate from researchers, while ideas for new products from customers, respectively customer contacts. Especially in custom manufacturing, "demand pull" prevails industrial reality. The "new product committee" is the body of choice for evaluating new and monitoring ongoing research activities. It evaluates all new product ideas, decides whether a new product idea should be taken up in research, reassesses a project at regular intervals and decides also on the abandonment of a project, once it becomes evident that the objectives cannot be reached. In a typical project, the overall responsibility for the economic and technical success lies with the project champion. He is assisted by the project manager, who is responsible for the technical success. In custom manufacturing, a typical project starts with the acceptance of the product idea, which originates mainly from business development, by the new product committee, followed by the preparation of a laboratory process, and ends with the successful completion of demonstration runs on industrial scale and the signature of a multiyear supply contract. The input from the customer is contained in the "technology package". Its main constituents are (1) reaction scheme, (2) target of project & deliverables (product, quantity, required dates, specifications), (3) list of analytical methods, (4) process development opportunities (stepwise assessment), (5) list of required reports, (6) Safety, Health and Environment (SHE) issues, (7) materials to be supplied by customer and (8) packaging & shipping information. The technical part of a project usually determines its duration. Depending on the quality of the information contained in the "technology package" received from the customer and the complexity of the project as such, particularly the number of steps that have to be performed, it can be anywhere from 12 to 24 months. Depending on the amount of research involved, the total budget easily amounts to several million US dollars.

== Markets ==
Fine chemicals are used as starting materials for specialty chemicals. The latter are obtained either by direct formulation or after chemical/biochemical transformation of intermediates to active substances. Life sciences, primarily pharmaceutical, agrochemical and food and feed industries, are the main consumers of fine chemicals.

=== Market size ===
Fine chemicals account for about 4% of the universe of chemicals. The chemical industry, valued at $2,500 billion, is dominated mainly by oil-, gas-, and mineral-derived commodities (~40%) and a large variety of specialty chemicals at the interface between industry and the public (~55%). The global production value of fine chemicals is estimated at $85 billion, of which about 2/3, or $55 billion, are produced captively, with $30 billion representing the global revenues of the fine chemical industry. The corresponding figures for the major user, the pharmaceutical industry, are $32 billion and $23 billion respectively. For a number of reasons, such as the lack of statistical data and the somewhat equivocal definition, it is not possible to exactly determine the size of the fine chemical market.

Table 5: Breakdown of Fine Chemicals Market by Major Applications
		Size ($ billion)
		total A.I.	captive	merchant
Life sciences	Pharmaceuticals	55	32	23
Life sciences	Agrochemicals	15	11	4
Various specialty chemicals		15	10	5
Total fine-chemical industry		85	53	32

In Table 5, the approximately $85 billion fine chemical market is subdivided into major applications according to their relevance: fine chemicals for pharmaceuticals, agrochemicals, and specialty chemicals outside life sciences. Furthermore, a distinction is made between captive (in-house) production and merchant market. Pharmaceutical fine chemicals (PFCs) account for two-thirds of the total. Out of the PFC value of $55 billion, about $23 billion (~40%) are traded, and $32 billion (~60%) are the production value of the pharma industry's in-house production. Within life science products, fine chemicals for agro and veterinary drugs follow in importance. The production value for fine chemicals used for specialty chemicals other than pharmaceuticals and agrochemicals is estimated at $15 billion. As the leading specialty chemical companies (Akzo Nobel, Dow, DuPont, Evonik, Chemtura and Mitsubishi) are backward-integrated, the share of in-house production is estimated at 75%, leaving a merchant market of approximately $5 billion.

=== Target markets ===
==== Pharmaceuticals ====
The pharmaceutical industry constitutes the most important customer base for the fine chemical industry. The largest companies are Pfizer, USA; Roche, Switzerland, GlaxoSmithKline, UK; Sanofi Aventis, France, and Novartis, Switzerland. All are active in R&D, manufacturing and marketing. Pharmaceuticals containing more than 2000 different active ingredients are in commerce today; a sizable number of them are sourced from the fine chemical industry. The industry also has a track record of above-average growth. The fine chemical industry has a keen interest in the top-selling or "blockbuster drugs", those with worldwide annual sales in excess of $1 billion. Their number has increased steadily, from 27 in 1999 to 51 in 2001, 76 in 2003, and then levelled off.

Table: 6 Top 10 (20) Proprietary Drugs 2010
	Brand	API	Company	sales 2010 ($ bn)
1	Lipitor	atorvastatin	Pfizer	11.8
2	Plavix	clopidogrel	Bristol-Myers Squibb Sanofi-Aventis	9.4
3	Remicade*	infliximab	J&J, Merck, Mitsubishi, Tanabe	8.0
4	Advair/ Seretide	salmeterol + fluticasone	Glaxo SmithKline	8.0
5	Enbrel*	etanecerpt	Amgen, Pfizer, Takeda	7.4
6	Avastin*	bevacizumab	Roche	6.8
7	Abilify	aripiprazole	Bristol-Myers Squibb Otsuka	6.8
8	Mabthera/ Rituxan*	rituximab	Roche	6.7
9	Humira*	adalimumab	AbbVie (Before: Abbott)	6.5
10	Diovan & Co-Diovan	valsartan	Novartis	6.1
Total Top 10				77.5

Sales of the top 20 blockbuster drugs are reported in Table 6. The APIs of 12 of them are "small" (LMW) molecules. Averaging a MW of 477, they have quite complex structures. They typically show three cyclic moieties. 10 of them exhibit at least one N-heterocyclic moiety. Five of the top 10, up from none in 2005, are biopharmaceuticals. The largest-selling non-proprietary drugs are paracetamol, omeprazole, ethinylestradiol, amoxicillin, pyridoxine, and ascorbic acid. The innovator pharma companies mainly require custom manufacturing services for their proprietary drug substances. The demand is driven primarily by the number of new drug launches, the volume requirements and the industry's "make or buy" strategy. A summary of the pro's and con's for outsourcing from the pharma industry's perspective is given in Table 7. As extended studies at the Stern Business School of the New York City University have shown, financial considerations clearly favor the "buy" option.

Table 7: Pro's and Con's for Outsourcing API Manufacture
Pro's
- concentrate on core activities (innovation & marketing)
- deploy your financial resources for more profitable investments
- benefit from F.C. industry's know how and expertise
- eliminate long lead times to build and validate a manufacturing facility
- free capacity for new product introductions
- avoid risks of using hazardous chemistry
Con's
- loss of tax benefits resulting from production of APIs in tax havens
- dissemination of Intellectual Property
- loss of know how
- job losses
- under-utilization of in-house production capacity

Teva and Sandoz are by far the largest generics companies. They differ from their competitors not only in sales revenues but also because they are backwards integrated and have proprietary drugs in their portfolios. They also vie for the biosimilars market.

Several thousand small or virtual pharma companies focus on R&D of just a few lead compounds. They typically originate mostly from academia. Therefore, their R&D strategy is more focused on the elucidation of the biological roots of diseases rather than developing synthesis methods.

==== Agrochemicals ====
Agrochemical companies are the second largest users of fine chemicals. Most products have a "pharmaceutical heritage". As a consequence of an intensive M&A activity (Mergers and Acquisitions) over the past 10–20 years, the industry now is more consolidated than the pharmaceutical industry. The top 10 companies, led by Syngenta, Switzerland; Bayer Cropsciences, Germany: Monsanto, USA; BASF Crop Protection, Germany, and Dow Agrosciences, USA have a share of almost 95% of the total 2,000,000 tons / $48.5 billion pesticide output in 2010. Since the 1990s, the R&D effort has been focused mainly on gene modified (GM) seeds. At both Monsanto and DuPont's seed subsidiary, Pioneer Hi-Bred, the GM seed businesses already account for more than 50% of total sales. 100 new LMW agrochemicals were launched between 2000 and 2009. However, only 8 products achieved sales in excess of $100 million per year.

Generics play a bigger role in the agro than in the pharma industry. They represent some 70% of the global market. China National Chemical Corp is the world's largest supplier of generic farm chemicals. Mahkteshim Agan, Israel, and Cheminova, Denmark, rank second and third. Apart from these multibillion-dollar companies, there are hundreds of smaller firms with sales of less than $50 million per year, mainly in India and China. The incidence of the cost of the active ingredient is about 33%, much higher than in drugs. Depending on the climatic conditions affecting crop yields, consumption and prices of agrochemicals are subject to wide fluctuations from year to year, also impacting the suppliers.

The molecular structures of modern agrochemicals are much more complex than in older products, but lower than their pharma counterparts. The average molecular weight of the top 10 is 330, as compared with 477 for the top 10. In comparison to reagents used in pharmaceutical fine chemical syntheses, hazardous chemicals, including sodium azide, halogens, methyl sulfide, phosgene and phosphorus chlorides, are more frequently used. Agrochemical companies sometimes outsource just these steps, which require specialized equipment, on toll conversion deals. With exception of the pyrethroids, which are photostable modifications of naturally occurring pyrethrums, active ingredients of agrochemicals are rarely chiral. Examples within herbicides are Monsanto's round-up (glyphosate) and Syngenta's cyclohexadione-type mesotrione and paraquat dichloride. Within insecticides, the traditional organophosphates, like malathion, and pyrethroids, such as γ-cyhalotrin, are being substituted for by neonicotinoids, like Bayer's imidacloprid and Syngenta's thiamethoxam and pyrazoles, such as BASF's fipronil. Chloranthaniliprole is the most notable of Du Pont's anthranilic diamide family of broad spectrum insecticides. Within fungicides, the strobilurins, a new class, are growing rapidly and have already captured more than 30% of the $10 billion global fungicide market. Syngenta's azoxystrobin was the first product launched. BASF's F-500 Series, which includespyraclostrobin and kresoxim-methyl, and Bayer CropScience, and Monsanto are developing new compounds in this class. Combination pesticides, such as Monsanto's Genuity and SmartStax are more and more frequently used.

==== Other specialty chemical industries ====
Apart from life sciences, specialty chemicals —and therefore their active ingredients, commodities or fine chemicals, as the case may be — are used ubiquitously in both industrial applications, such as biocides and corrosion inhibitors in cooling water towers, and consumer applications, such as personal care and household products. The active ingredients extend from high-price low-volume fine chemicals, used for liquid crystal displays, to large-volume/low-price amino acids used as feed additives.

Table: 8: Other Specialty Chemicals Industries
Industry	Sales ($ billion)	Attrac-tiveness	Products
Animal Health	~ 20	♦♦♦	Typical a.h. products derive from human medicines, e.g. Reconzile, dubbed "puppy Prozac". Paraciticides are the largest product category. Good growth prospects in fish farming.
Adhesives & Sealants	~ 60	♦♦	Uses extend from household, e.g. paper gluing, to high-tech specialty products for assembling electronic parts, automotive and aircraft construction.
Biocides	~ 3	♦	Largest applications are wood conversation and water treatment. A.I.'s mainly commodities
Catalysts & Enzymes	~ 15	♦	Catalysts (automotive, polymers, petroleum processing, chemicals) / enzymes (detergents / technical enzymes, food & feed) = 80 / 20
Dyestuffs & Pigments	~ 10	♦	Mostly based on large volume aromatic compounds, e.g., letter acids .Asian dyestuff prod, > 10^{6} mtpa. Some niche products, e.g. colour shifting pigments
Electronic Chemicals	~ 30	♦♦♦	Sizeable and growing demand for fine chemicals, e.g. octafluorocyclobutane for etching. for liquid crystals and organic light emitting diodes (OLED).
Flavours & Fragrances	~ 20	♦♦	~3000 molecules are used, e.g. (-) menthol [20,000 tons], polycyclic musks [10,000 tons], vanilline, linalool, geraniol, heterocyclics, 2-phenylethanol)
Food & Feed Additives	40-50	♦♦	Mainly amino acids (L-lysine [10^{6} tons], L-methionine, ...), vitamins (C [> 10^{5} tons], niacin, riboflavin, ...), artificial sweeteners (aspartame, splenda) and carotenoids
Specialty Polymers	NA	♦♦	Aerospace: Fluorinated poly ethylene/propylene,[30,000 tons], Polyether ether ketones [PEEK], Polyimides, Precision parts: Aramides [25,000 t], polybenzazoles

*fine chemicals merchant market size, growth potential

Examples of applications in eight areas, ranging from adhesives to specialty polymers, are listed in Table 8. Overall, the attractiveness of the fine chemical industry is smaller than the life science industry. The total market, expressed in finished product sales, amounts to $150–200 billion, or about one fourth of the pharma market. The embedded fine chemicals account for an estimated $15 billion. Further disadvantages are the backward integration of the big players, e.g. Akzo-Nobel, Netherlands; Ajinomoto, Japan; Danone, France; Everlight Chemical Industrial Corp., Taiwan; Evonik-Degussa, Germany; Givaudan and Nestlé, Switzerland, Novozymes, Denmark, and Procter & Gamble, and Unilever USA. Innovation is based on new formulations of existing products, rather than the development of new fine chemicals. It is most likely to happen in application areas unrelated to human health, where NCEs are subject to very extensive testing.

=== Target products and services ===
Global sales of proprietary drugs are estimated at $735 billion in 2010, or almost 90% of the total pharma market. Global sales of generics are about $100 billion, or just over 10% of the total pharma market. Due to the much lower unit price, their market share will be close to 30% on an API volume/volume basis.

==== Custom manufacturing ====
The products and services offered by the fine chemical industry fall into two broad categories: (1) "Exclusives" or custom manufacturing (CM) and (2) "standard" or "catalogue" products. "Exclusives", provided mostly under contract research or custom manufacturing arrangements, prevail in business with life science companies; "standards" prevail in other target markets. Service-intense custom manufacturing constitutes the most prominent activity of the fine chemical industry. Custom manufacturing is the antonym of outsourcing. In custom manufacturing, a specialty-chemicals company outsources the process development, pilot plant, and industrial-scale production of an active ingredient, or a predecessor thereof, to one, or a few, fine chemical companies. The intellectual property of the product, and generally also the manufacturing process, stay with the customer. The customer-supplier relationship is governed by an exclusive supply agreement. At the beginning of cooperation, the customer provides a "tech package" which, in its simplest version, includes a laboratory synthesis description and SHE recommendations. In this case, the whole scale up, which comprises a factor of about one million (10 gram → 10 ton quantities), is done by the fine chemical company.

==== Standard products ====
Non-exclusives, "standard" or "catalogue products" constitute the second most important outlet for fine chemicals after custom manufacturing. API-for-Generics are the most important sub-category. Because of patent expiries, over 60 of the top 200 drugs alone, representing aggregated sales of over $150 billion, have fallen into the public domain within the past decade. This, along with government-backed incentives, are causing global sales of generics to rapidly increase. Asian companies currently dominate the API-for-Generics business. They have multiple advantages, including their low cost basis, large home markets, and significant previous manufacturing experience compared to western manufacturers in producing for their domestic and other non-regulated markets.

== Financials ==
=== Investment costs ===
Investment costs for multipurpose plants are high in comparison with product output. However, they vary considerably, depending on the location, size of equipment and degree of sophistication (e.g., automation, containment, quality of equipment, complexity of infrastructure). An example for a cGMP multipurpose plant built in the US is shown in Table 9. The investment cost of $21 million comprises just the equipment and installation. The building, property and external services are excluded. For comparison purposes, the investment cost per m^{3} reactor volume is used. In this case, it is $0.9 million. The amount includes the cost of the reaction vessel itself plus an equitable part of the ancillary equipment, like feeding tanks, piping, pumps & process control. If larger or smaller reactors were installed, the unit cost per m^{3} would decrease or decrease with the exponent 0.5, respectively. Hence, by increasing the equipment size, manufacturing costs on a per kilogram (kg^{−1}) basis typically decrease substantially. Costs for a plant that is used for the production of only non regulated intermediates would be substantially lower. Pharma companies tend to spend up to ten times more for a plant with the same capacity. In contrast, investment costs in developing countries, particularly in India or China, are considerably lower.

Table 9: Investment Cost for a cGMP Multipurpose Plant
Equipment / Investment	Numbers
Description of main equipment
Production trains Reactor vessels (volume = 4 m^{3}).... Total reactor volume Filtration units Dryers	2 6.... 24 m^{3} 2; 2
Capital investment
Total capital investment: Investment per production train; Investment per piece of main equipment; Investment per m3 reactor volume	$21 million $ 11.5 million $ 2.1 million $ 0.9 million

=== Manufacturing costs ===
The raw material consumption and the conversion cost are the two elements that establish the manufacturing cost for a particular fine chemical. The former is determined primarily by the unit consumption and the purchasing cost of the materials used; the latter, by the throughput in kilograms per day in a given production bay. A precise calculation of the conversion cost is a demanding task. Different products with widely differing throughputs are produced in campaigns in multipurpose plants, occupying the equipment to different extents. Therefore, both the production capacity and the equipment utilization for a specific fine chemical are difficult to determine. Moreover, cost elements such as labor, capital, utilities, maintenance, waste disposal, and quality control cannot be allocated unambiguously.

An approximative calculation can be done by an experienced process development or pilot plant chemist on the basis of the laboratory synthesis procedure and by breaking down the process into unit operations, the standard costs of which have been determined previously. Controlling has to be involved for a more in-depth costing. It must fairly allocate costs for production capacity which is not used, whether because part of a production bay is idle, because of lack of demand or because a reactor is not required for a particular process.

Manufacturing costs usually are reported on a per kilogram product basis. For the purpose of benchmarking (both internal and external), the volume x time/output (VTO) is a useful aid.

Table 10: Indicative Cost Structure of a Fine Chemical Company
Cost elements			Details	Share
raw materials			inclusive solvents	30%
conversion cost	plant specific	utilities and energy	electric power, steam, brine	4–5 %
conversion cost	plant specific	plant labor	shift and daytime work	10–15 %
conversion cost	plant specific	capital cost	depreciation and interest on capital	15%
conversion cost	plant specific	plant overhead	QC, maintenance, waste disposal, etc.	10 %
conversion cost	plant specific	research & development	inclusive pilot plant	8 %
conversion cost	marketing & sales		inclusive promotion	5%
conversion cost	general overhead		administrative services	15 %

An indicative cost structure for a fine chemical company is shown in Table 10. Nowadays, a full 7-day/week operation, consisting of four or five shift teams, each working 8h per day, has become the standard. In terms of production costs, this is the most advantageous scheme. Higher salaries for night work are more than offset by better fixed cost absorption. As part of the budgeting process, standard costs for a production campaign of a particular fine chemical are determined on the basis of past experience. The actual results of the campaign are then compared with the standard. The capability of a fine chemical company to make dependable manufacturing cost forecasts is a distinct competitive advantage.

=== Profitability ===
The fine chemical industry has undergone several boom and bust phases during its almost 30 years of existence. The biggest boom took place in the late 1990s, when high-dosage, high volume anti-AIDS drugs and COX-2 inhibitors gave a big boost to custom manufacturing. After the end of the "irrational exuberance" in 2000, the industry suffered a first bust in 2003, as a result of capacity expansions, the advent of Asian competitors and a ruinous M&A activity, and several billion dollars of shareholder value were lost. A minor boom was associated with stockpiling of GlaxoSmithKline's Relenza (zanamivir) and Roche's Tamiflu (oseltamivir phosphate) by many countries in order to prepare for a possible avian flu epidemic. Surprisingly, the main cause for the 2009 slump was not the general recession, but slow-downs of growth and inventory adjustments by the pharma industry. They resulted in postponements or cancellations of orders. The unfavorable development was in sharp contrast to the very optimistic growth forecasts, which many fine chemical companies had announced. These were based on equally promising sector reports from investment banks which, in turn, had evolved from forward projections of the preceding boom period. In most cases, these projections were missed by a large margin.

Following these slumps, almost half of the industry achieved a return on sales (ROS) of more than 10%, and less than 10% received an ROS below 5%. In the worst years, 2003 and 2009, almost half of the companies suffered from an ROS of less than 5%. During this period, the average EBITDA/sales and EBIT/sales ratios of representative companies were 15% and 7 1/2%, respectively; during the boom, they were 20% and 10–13% respectively and, during the bust, they were 10% and 5% respectively. The differences within these ranges reflects the volatility of the industry's profitability. All in all, the average Western fine-chemical firms have been making a return below the cost of capital — they are not reinvestment grade.

== Outlook ==
Two main trends impinge on the industry. On the supply side, biotechnology is rapidly gaining importance. In the synthesis of small molecule fine chemicals, the use of biocatalysts and microbial fermentation enable both a more sustainable and economic production than conventional organic chemistry. In the synthesis of big molecules, such as biopharmaceuticals, it is the method of choice. Biopharmaceuticals are expected to grow 15% per year, three times as fast as small molecule drugs. Five of the top ten drugs were biopharmaceuticals in 2010 (see table 6), and this is expected to grow to eight by 2016 (see table 2).

On the demand side, the main customer base for fine chemicals, the pharmaceutical industry, is faced with slower growth of demand, patent expirations of many lucrative blockbuster drugs and stalling new product launches. In order to restrain these challenges, the leading companies are implementing restructuring programs, including a reduction of in-house chemical manufacturing and plant eliminations. Outsourcing is moving from a purely opportunistic to a strategic approach. It is difficult to judge whether the positive or negative effects of these initiatives will prevail. In a worst-case scenario, a condition could develop whereby even top-tier mid-sized, family-owned fine-chemical companies with state-of-the-art plants and processes could be relegated to producing small quantities of fine chemicals for new life-science products in late stage of development. In agro fine chemicals, the active ingredients are become more sophisticated and better performing. Therefore, they require multipurpose plants instead of the dedicated plants prevailing in the industry so far. At the same token, outsourcing is gaining ground.

Globalization results in a shift of fine chemical production from the industrialized to developing countries. The latter benefit not only from a "low cost/high skill" advantage, but also from a rapidly rising domestic demand for Western medicine. Despite the mantras of Western industry leaders, the cost advantage of the Asian producers is going to persist. As the pharmerging countries mainly use generics, their market share continues to grow to the detriment of originator pharmaceuticals and agrochemicals. This is also the case for biosimilars, the generic versions of biopharmaceuticals. As a consequence of the harsh business climate, many Western fine chemical companies or divisions created during the "irrational exuberance" at the end of the 20th century have already exited from the sector. Others will follow suit or will be acquired by private equity firms. Survival strategies include implementing lean production principles originally developed by the automotive industry and extending the business model to also include contract research at the beginning and active drug formulation towards the end of the added value chain. This latter strategy, however, is not finding unanimous approval by industry experts.

Although the demand for fine chemicals on the merchant market has not grown to the extent originally anticipated, fine chemicals still provide opportunities for companies, which are fostering certain critical success factors, namely running fine chemicals as a core business, pursuing niche technologies—primarily biotechnology—and taking advantage of the opportunities offered by the Asian market.

== See also ==
- Chemical industry
- Commercial classification of chemicals
- Commodity chemicals
- Petrochemical
- Speciality chemicals

== Bibliography ==
- Pollak, Peter (2011). Fine Chemicals – The Industry and the Business (2nd. rev. ed.). J. Wiley & Sons. ISBN 978-0-470-62767-9.
