= Bachem =

Bachem may refer to:

- the Bachem Ba 349 Natter, a German rocket-powered interceptor prototype
- Bachem Holding, a Swiss company
- Erich Bachem, German engineer
- Martha Bachem, Austrian-German figure skater
- Nick Bachem, German professional golfer
