= List of chemical classifications =

List of chemical classification and labeling systems

Chemical classification systems attempt to classify elements or compounds according to certain chemical functional or structural properties. Whereas the structural properties are largely intrinsic, functional properties and the derived classifications depend to a certain degree on the type of chemical interaction partners on which the function is exerted. Sometimes other criteria like purely physical ones (e.g. molecular weight) or – on the other hand – functional properties above the chemical level are also used for building chemical taxonomies.

Some systems mix the various levels, resulting in hierarchies where the domains are slightly confused, for example having structural and functional aspects end up on the same level. Whereas chemical function is closely dependent on chemical structure, the situation becomes more involved when e.g. pharmacological function is integrated, because the QSAR can usually not be directly computed from structural qualities.

== Physico-chemical ==
- by molecular weight
- by electrical charge: uncharged, positively, negatively, partially charged
  - formal charge, oxidation state
- solubility
- pH value (or pKA value)

== Functional ==
- by functional groups
- by biological activity (mostly appropriate only for large biological molecules (as at least one interacting partner), in particular enzymes, depends on chemical functions of their constituent amino acids)
  - ligand vs. receptor, coenzyme
  - EC number
  - TC number
  - pharmacophore vs. non-drug
- General commercial classification of chemicals

== Mixed systems and directories ==
- Anatomical Therapeutic Chemical Classification System
- Gene Ontology
- Globally Harmonized System of Classification and Labelling of Chemicals
- Chemical Entities of Biological Interest

== Historical ==
- Döbereiner's triads
