= Heterogeneous metal catalyzed cross-coupling =

Chemical reaction

Heterogeneous metal catalyzed cross-coupling is a subset of metal catalyzed cross-coupling in which a heterogeneous metal catalyst is employed. Generally heterogeneous cross-coupling catalysts consist of a metal dispersed on an inorganic surface or bound to a polymeric support with ligands. Heterogeneous catalysts provide potential benefits over homogeneous catalysts in chemical processes in which cross-coupling is commonly employed—particularly in the fine chemical industry—including recyclability and lower metal contamination of reaction products. However, for cross-coupling reactions, heterogeneous metal catalysts can suffer from pitfalls such as poor turnover and poor substrate scope, which have limited their utility in cross-coupling reactions to date relative to homogeneous catalysts. Heterogeneous metal catalyzed cross-couplings, as with homogeneous metal catalyzed ones, most commonly use Pd as the cross-coupling metal.

== Reaction mechanism and implications ==
Pd-catalyzed cross-coupling reactions catalyzed by a heterogeneous catalyst are thought to generally proceed, not on the surface of the solid catalyst, but in the solution phase. The solution-phase intermediates are not necessarily distinguishable from those obtained during homogeneous cross-couplings – for example, a heterogeneous Pd-catalyzed Suzuki reaction still proceeds via oxidative addition of the electrophile by Pd(0), transmetallation of a boronate, and reductive elimination to give product and regenerate Pd(0) (Figure 1A). The activity of heterogeneous catalysts in cross-coupling seems to be tied to the ability of the electrophile (usually an aryl halide) to undergo oxidative addition with an atom of Pd(0), whether on the solid catalyst surface or already in solution, after which the rest of the catalytic cycle will take place – in solution.

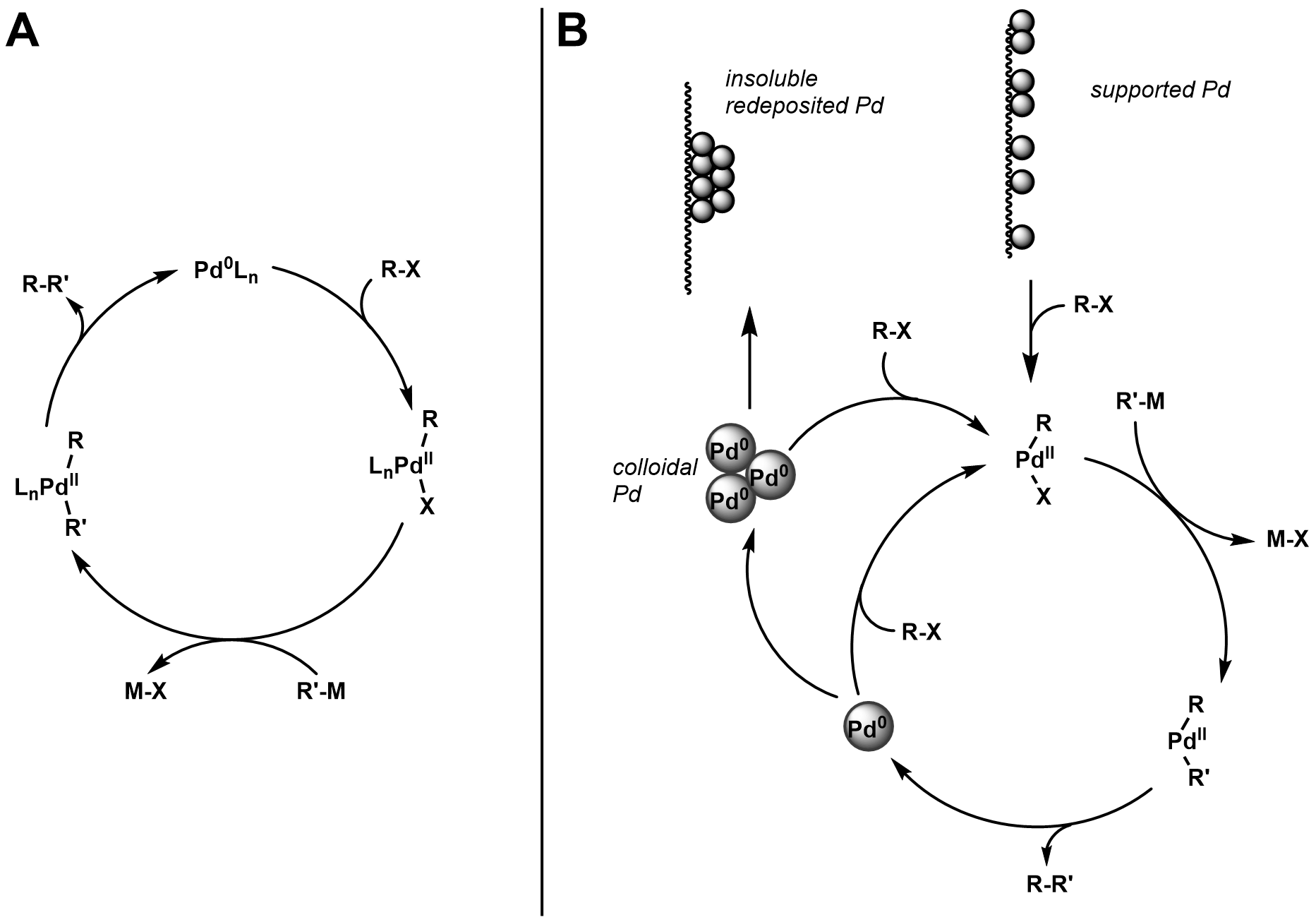
Figure 1. Mechanism for a generic cross-coupling reaction with A) homogenous Pd in the presence of a ligand and B) heterogeneous, ligandless Pd as the Pd source.

The role of the solid phase in heterogeneous metal catalyzed cross-coupling, then, is more subtle than one might expect. Rather than enabling the productive catalytic cycle, the solid phase acts as a reservoir of Pd that is accessible to the productive catalytic cycle. For heterogeneous catalytic cross-coupling which involves unligated Pd (for example, when Pd/C is used as the catalyst), there exists a significant equilibrium that partitions Pd(0) between atomic, solution-phase monomers, surface-bound Pd, colloidal Pd and higher order Pd aggregates (Figure 1B). Aggregation of Pd atoms into clusters ultimately leads to irreversible precipitation of insoluble metallic Pd, which limits the maximum turnover number that can be achieved. An effective heterogeneous cross-coupling catalyst will recapture monomeric Pd or lower order oligomers and colloids onto the solid phase in order to maintain low concentrations of these species in solution, disfavouring aggregation and favouring instead the productive elementary steps of cross-coupling. This may explain the (perhaps counterintuitive) observation that lower catalyst loadings can improve turnover number for a heterogeneous cross-coupling catalyst system (Pd on porous glass, in the Heck reactions of 4-bromoacetophenone at 180 °C).

The solid-phase to solution-phase mass transfer requirement for Pd in most heterogeneous cross-couplings has further implications. Because the supported ligand for a polymer-supported catalyst is not optimized for reactivity, and because the productive catalytic cycle usually ignores the supported ligand entirely even if present, “difficult” cross-coupling reactions which require fine tuning of the electronic and steric properties of the Pd catalyst – via expensive, designer ligands – are scarcely reported in a heterogeneous context. A 2021 survey of heterogeneous metal catalyzed cross-couplings in the fine chemical industry reported, out of 22 examples, 19 Suzuki or Heck reactions, which included only 2 examples with N-basic heterocycles, and only 4 examples with a singly-ortho-substituted electrophile (representative example in Scheme 1). In nearly all these cases, reactions were initially developed with a homogeneous Pd catalyst (typically Pd(OAc)2 with either no exogenous ligand or PPh3 as ligand) on smaller scale, and only evaluated with heterogeneous Pd catalysts, (typically Pd/C or Pd black) for scaleup to decagram to multi-hundred-kilo scales, once process considerations such as process mass intensity and separation costs became significant. Notably, no polymer-supported catalysts were used; for these real-world examples of heterogeneous catalytic cross-coupling on scale, inorganic heterogeneous catalysts (such as Pd/C) are far cheaper and more robust than polymer-supported ligated Pd catalysts, and thus more commonly employed.

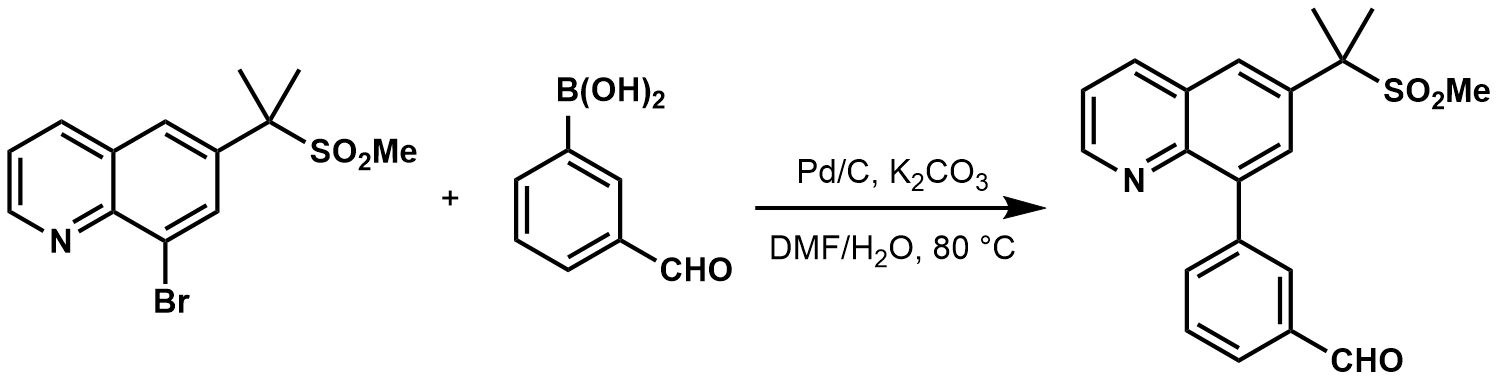
Scheme 1. Pd/C catalyzed cross coupling performed on 2.5 kg scale in 85% yield with <10 ppm residual Pd following filtration and DMF washing.

When designing a polymer-ligand solid support for Pd, the ligands should not simply be immobilized variants of homogeneous ligands which effect catalysis in the presence of Pd. Rather, immobilized ligands should optimize the redeposition of Pd onto the solid phase at the end of each catalytic cycle in a catalytically active form that is ready for a subsequent catalytic cycle. Ligand sets which are rarely seen in homogeneous cross-coupling, then, appear in heterogeneous ligand-containing Pd catalysts. For example, Buchmeiser et al. have reported high turnover N,N-bidentate ligands (Figure 2) which achieve turnover numbers (TONs) of >10^{5} in the Heck reactions of iodobenzene, and TON ca. 10^{3} in the amination of bromobenzene. These TONs are competitive with even the best solution TONs, giving clear advantages for this system for separation of the product from catalyst post-reaction.

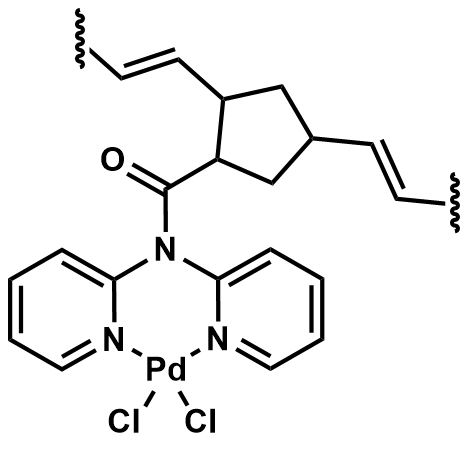
Figure 2. A high-turnover N,N-supported Pd complex.

=== Kinetics ===
The “shuttling” kinetics of Pd mass transfer (from solid phase to solution phase and back to solid phase) have been verified by three-phase test experiments, while the solution-phase catalytic activity which characterizes most heterogeneous cross-coupling has been verified by TEM, hot filtration, and poisoning experiments. However, truly heterogeneous cross-coupling systems may exist. Poyatos et al. immobilized a Pd pincer carbene complex (Figure 3) on MK-10 clay and observed that while high TON (ca. 10^{3}) and TOF was maintained relative to the soluble catalyst, no activity was found in the solution for the supported catalyst – a strong indicator of a fully heterogeneous catalytic mechanism.

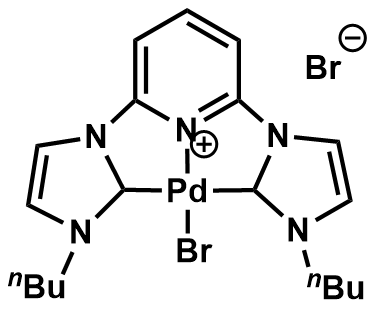
Figure 3. A Pd pincer carbene complex which may operate via a fully heterogeneous mechanism when immobilized.

== Heterogeneous metal catalyzed cross-coupling in flow vs batch ==
For batch cross-couplings which use immobilized Pd, the concentration of solution-phase Pd increases dramatically when the reaction commences (as Pd is transferred out of the solid phase), and has decreased dramatically by the time full conversion has been achieved (by readsorption or precipitation onto the solid support). Such a kinetic profile matches the processing requirements of a batch process – although some amount of metal remains in solution post-reaction, the supported Pd catalyst can usually be recycled several times, despite the limitations described above.

In contrast, continuous flow systems do not allow for effective metal redeposition on the solid support; the reaction stream will transport the Pd through the support due to continuous metal leaching/readsorption (Figure 4). Cumulative periods of operation inevitably result in significant metal leaching from the flow system, depleting the supported catalyst's activity and giving low recyclability, with – typically – no particular benefit for reactivity.

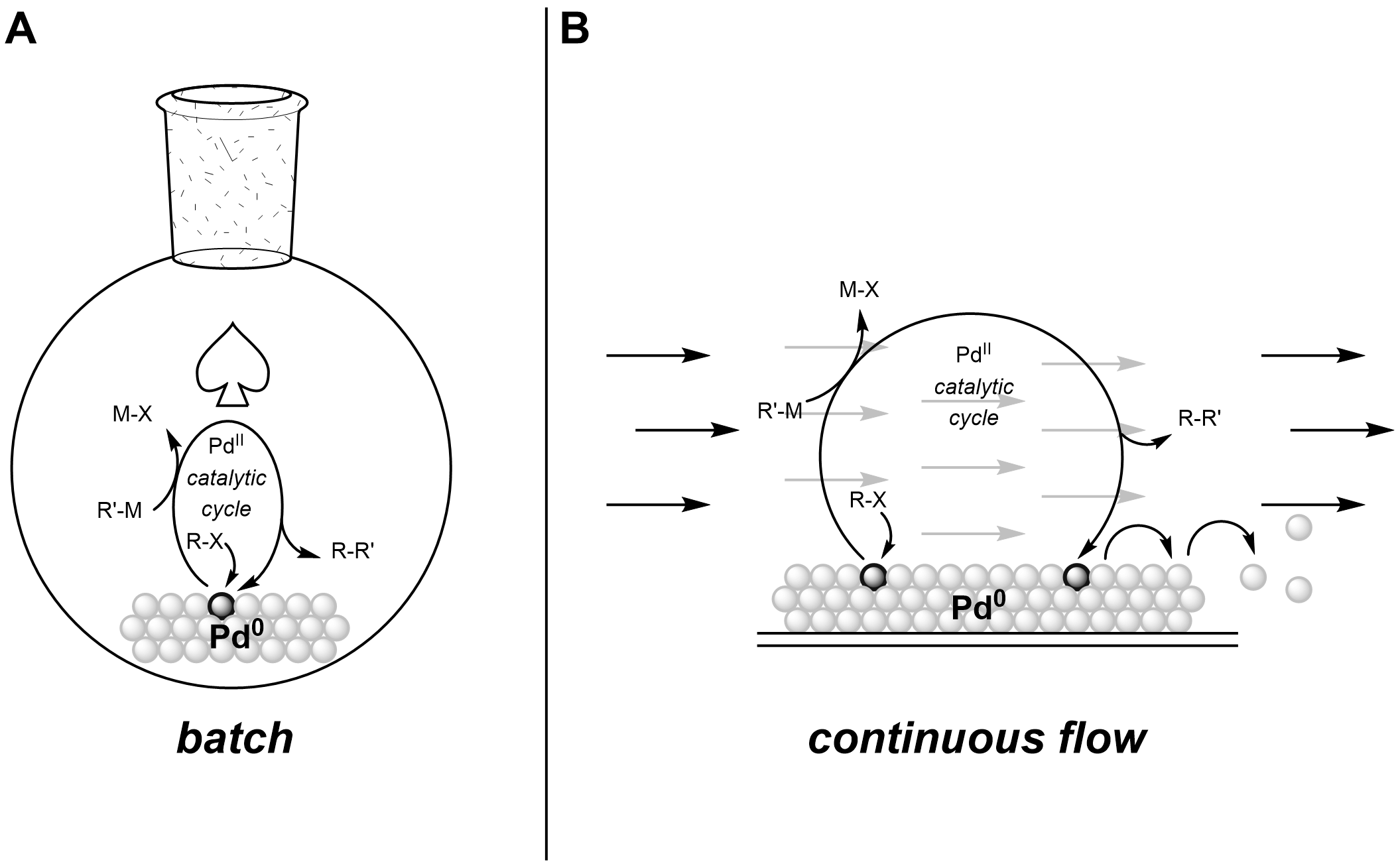
Figure 4. Heterogeneous Pd catalyzed cross-couplings in A) batch vs B) flow.

In principle, it is possible for the metal leaching inherent to continuous flow cross-coupling to be avoided. Plucinkski and coworkers developed a continuous Mizoroki-Heck and hydrogenation sequence consisting of two separated packed-bed reactors containing Pd/C. Because the Pd/C-catalyzed hydrogenation proceeds via a heterogeneous mechanism, metal leaching due to the second hydrogenation step is minimal, and Pd leached from the first part of the reactor during the Heck coupling can be recaptured by the second packed bed during the hydrogenation. By cycling the direction of flow between forward and reverse, catalytic activity could be maintained over two consecutive experiments, although a greater number of cycles would be desirable in order to vindicate this strategy for increasing turnover in solid-supported flow catalysts for cross-coupling.

== Separation ==
Heterogeneous catalysts are easily removed from a reaction mixture by filtration. Although some amount of metal catalyst typically remains in the product from leaching, these amounts tend to be lower than those remaining after workup of a homogenous metal-catalyzed cross-coupling.

=== Magnetic removal ===
A heterogeneous catalyst consisting of Pd supported by silica-coated Fe_{2}O_{3}/Fe_{3}O_{4} nanoparticles allows the reaction to be heated by electrical induction, and also allows facile magnetic separation of catalyst and product post-reaction. Copper ferrite has been reported as a heterocycle arylation catalyst and can be similarly separated from the reaction with a magnet.

== Recycling ==
Heterogeneous cross-coupling catalysts typically lose some portion of activity to metal leaching between different runs as a result of the solution-phase catalytic cycle (see above), and hence can only be recycled a finite number of times.

Multiple groups have pointed out that the need for recycling is obviated at extremely high turnover and low catalyst loading, since in these cases the catalyst cost is negligible relative to the cost of other reaction components. As a result, for most cross-coupling reactions, in which heterogeneous catalysts generally require higher loadings than equivalent homogeneous ones, the benefits of heterogeneous catalysts afforded by the greater ease of recycling may be outweighed by the disadvantages – higher catalyst loadings, and the additional process costs. Additionally, when catalyst loadings are lower than 10 ppm – the regulatory limit for several metals including Pd in pharmaceutical APIs – separation of the metal following the reaction does not even need to be performed. This nullifies another of the commonly perceived advantages of heterogeneous catalysts over their homogeneous counterparts.
