= Ferro Corporation =

American materials company

- Company type: Subsidiary
- Traded as: NYSE: FOE
- Industry: Specialty chemicals
- Founded: 1919
- Founder: Harry D. Cushman
- Headquarters: Mayfield Heights, Ohio
- Key people: Peter Thomas(CEO), Jeffrey L. Rutherford (CFO), Mark H. Duesenberg(VP), Ann E. Killian (VP)
- Revenue: $1,075 Million (2015), $1,111 Million (2014), $1,188 Million (2013), $1,344 Million (2012), $2,130 Million (2011)
- Number of employees: 4,846 (2015)
- Parent: Prince International Corporation
- Divisions: Inorganics, Organics, Electronic Materials
- Website: www.ferro.com

Ferro Corporation is an American producer of technology-based performance materials for manufacturers, focusing on four core segments: performance colors and glass; pigments, powders, and oxides; porcelain enamel; and tile coatings systems. Ferro was founded in 1919 by Harry D. Cushman in Cleveland. The company's headquarters are currently located in Mayfield Heights, Ohio.

In 2007, the company was listed as 844 on the Fortune 1000. As of 2011, Ferro operated 40 manufacturing facilities around the world.

== Restatement ==
On January 18, 2005, Ferro Corporation updated the status of its investigation into inappropriate accounting entries in its Performance Chemicals business and its restatement process affecting fiscal years 2001, 2002 and 2003 and the first quarter of 2004.

On September 9, 2021, Ferro announced that its shareholders voted overwhelmingly to approve its acquisition by an affiliate of Prince International Corporation at a special meeting of Ferro shareholders.

The former businesses of the Ferro Corporation, Prince Minerals and Chromoflo merged under the stewardship of Michael Wilson as Vibrantz Technologies.

== See also ==
- Printed electronics
