= Commodity chemical =

Group of industrial chemical compounds

Commodity chemicals (or bulk commodities or bulk chemicals) are a group of chemicals that are made on a very large scale to satisfy global markets. The average prices of commodity chemicals are regularly published in the chemical trade magazines and web sites such as Chemical Week and ICIS. There have been several studies of the scale and complexity of this market for example in the USA.

Commodity chemicals are a sub-sector of the chemical industry (other sub sectors are fine chemicals, specialty chemicals, inorganic chemicals, petrochemicals, pharmaceuticals, renewable energy (e.g. biofuels) and materials (e.g. biopolymers)). Commodity chemicals are differentiated primarily by the bulk of their manufacture.

== Types ==
Chemical compounds are often classified into two classes, inorganic and organic.

=== Inorganic chemicals ===
- aluminium sulfate
- ammonia
- ammonium nitrate
- ammonium sulfate
- carbon black
- chlorine
- diammonium phosphate
- monoammonium phosphate
- hydrochloric acid
- hydrogen fluoride
- hydrogen peroxide
- nitric acid
- oxygen
- phosphoric acid
- sodium carbonate
- sodium chlorate
- sodium hydroxide
- sodium silicate
- sulfuric acid
- titanium dioxide

=== Organic chemicals ===
Commonly traded commodity organic chemicals include:

- acetic acid
- acetone
- acrylic acid
- acrylonitrile
- adipic acid
- benzene
- butadiene
- butanol
- caprolactam
- cumene
- cyclohexane
- dioctyl phthalate
- ethanol
- ethylene
- ethylene oxide
- ethylene glycol
- formaldehyde
- methanol
- octanol
- phenol
- phthalic anhydride
- polypropylene
- polystyrene
- polyvinyl chloride
- propylene
- polypropylene glycol
- propylene oxide
- styrene
- terephthalic acid
- toluene
- toluene diisocyanate
- urea
- vinyl chloride
- xylenes

== Sectors ==
Commodity chemicals are produced to supply diverse but usually well-defined industrial needs. Some major sectors and their components are:

- plastics, synthetic fibers, synthetic rubber
- dyes, pigments, paints, coatings
- fertilizers, agricultural chemicals, pesticides
- cosmetics, soaps, cleaning agent, detergents
- pharmaceuticals
- mining

== See also ==
- Speciality chemicals
- Fine chemicals
- Chemical industry
- Petrochemical
- Chemical plant
- Organic chemistry
- Commercial classification of chemicals
