= Speciality chemicals =

Chemical products that provide a wide variety of effects

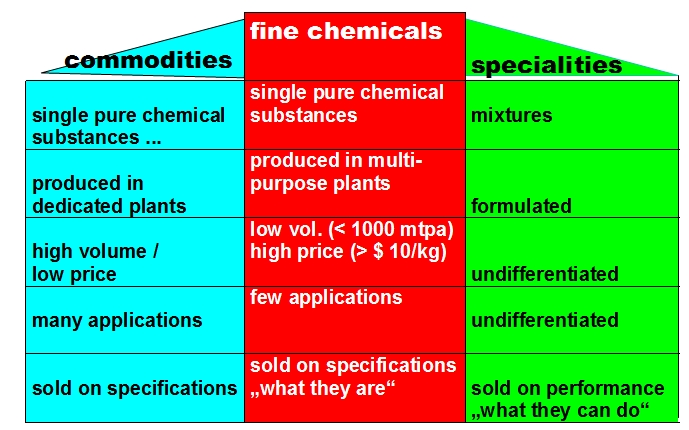

Speciality chemicals (also called specialties or effect chemicals) are particular chemical products that provide a wide variety of effects on which many other industry sectors rely. Some of the categories of speciality chemicals are adhesives, agrichemicals, cleaning materials, colors, cosmetic additives, construction chemicals, elastomers, flavors, food additives, fragrances, industrial gases, lubricants, paints, polymers, surfactants, and textile auxiliaries. Other industrial sectors such as automotive, aerospace, food, cosmetics, agriculture, manufacturing, and textiles are highly dependent on such products.

Speciality chemicals are materials used on the basis of their performance or function. Consequently, in addition to "effect" chemicals they are sometimes referred to as "performance" chemicals or "formulation" chemicals. They can be unique molecules or mixtures of molecules known as formulations. The physical and chemical characteristics of the single molecules or the formulated mixtures of molecules and the composition of the mixtures influences the performance end product. In commercial applications the companies providing these products more often than not provide targeted customer service to innovative individual technical solutions for their customers. This is a differentiating component of the service provided by speciality chemical producers when they are compared to the other sub-sectors of the chemical industry such as fine chemicals, commodity chemicals, petrochemicals and pharmaceuticals.

In the USA the speciality chemical manufacturers are members of the Society of Chemical Manufacturers and Affiliates (SOCMA). In the United Kingdom such companies are members of the British Association for Chemical Specialties (BACS). SOCMA state that "Specialty chemicals differ from commodity chemicals in that each one may have only one or two uses, while commodities may have dozens of different applications for each chemical. While commodity chemicals make up most of the production volume (by weight) in the global marketplace, specialty chemicals make up most of the diversity (number of different chemicals) in commerce at any given time."

== Manufacturing speciality chemicals ==
The speciality chemicals industry is a sector within the broader chemical industry that produces a diverse range of high-value chemicals and materials used in various applications. These chemicals, also known as performance or effect chemicals, are formulated to provide specific functions, enhance product performance, or meet specific customer requirements. Speciality chemicals are used in a wide array of industries, including automotive, aerospace, agriculture, construction, electronics, food and beverage, personal care, pharmaceutical, and textile.

Speciality chemicals are usually manufactured in batch chemical plants using batch processing techniques. A batch process is one in which a defined quantity of product is made from a fixed input of raw materials during a measured period of time. The batch process most often consists of introducing accurately measured amounts of starting materials into a vessel followed by a series of processes involving mixing, heating, cooling, making more chemical reactions, distillation, crystallization, separation, drying, packaging etc., taking place at predetermined and scheduled intervals. The manufacturing processes are supported by activities such as the quality testing, storage, warehousing, logistics of the products, and management by recycling, treatment and disposal of by-products, and waste streams. For the next "batch" the equipment may be cleaned and the above processes repeated.

Most speciality chemicals are organic chemicals that are used in a wide range of everyday products used by consumers and industry. It is a consumer driven sector and as such the speciality chemical industry has to be innovative, entrepreneurial and consumer-driven. In contrast to the production of commodity chemicals that are usually made on large scale single product manufacturing units to achieve economies of scale, speciality manufacturing units are required to be flexible because the products, raw materials, processes &, operating conditions and equipment mix may change on a regular basis to respond to the needs of customers.

In the United Kingdom there are many speciality chemical companies that are members of the British Association of Chemical Specialties (BACS) and also the Chemical Industries Association (CIA). Most of these companies have their manufacturing units based in the North of England for example see the membership of the Northeast of England they are members of the Northeast of England process Industry Cluster (NEPIC).

== The global speciality chemical market ==
The speciality chemical market size is valued at US$627.7 billion in 2021 and it is expected to grow to $886.2 billion by 2030, at a CAGR of 4.3% during 2022-2030. These speciality products are marketed as pesticides, speciality polymers, electronic chemicals, surfactants, construction chemicals, industrial cleaners, flavors and fragrances, speciality coatings, printing inks, water-soluble polymers, food additives, paper chemicals, oil field chemicals, plastic adhesives, adhesives and sealants, cosmetic chemicals, water management chemicals, catalysts, textile chemicals.

The world's top five speciality chemicals segments in 2012 were speciality polymers, industrial and institutional (I&I) cleaners, construction chemicals, electronic chemicals, and flavors and fragrances. These segments had a market share of about 36%. The ten largest segments accounted for 62% of total annual speciality chemicals sales.

== Speciality chemical companies ==
The speciality chemical market is complex and each speciality chemicals business segment comprises many sub-segments, each with individualized product, market and competitive profiles. This has given rise to a wide range of business needs and opportunities, consequently there are a large number of speciality chemical companies around the world. Many of these companies are SME's with their own niche products and sometimes technology focus. The common stock of over 400 speciality chemical companies from around the world are identified by Bloomberg, providers of global business and financial information. There are many more privately owned speciality chemical companies that are not quoted on the global stock markets.

In 2010, the 10 largest European speciality chemical companies were BASF, AkzoNobel, Clariant, Evonik, Cognis, Kemira, Lanxess, Rhodia, Wacker and Croda. By definition, speciality chemicals are produced in relatively small quantities but they represent 28 per cent of EU chemical sales.

The 10 largest USA speciality chemical companies are The Lubrizol Corporation, Huntsman, Ashland, Chemtura, Rockwood, Albemarle, Cabot, W. R. Grace, Ferro Corporation, and Cytec Industries.

The emergence of India as a manufacturer and supplier of speciality chemicals has had a major impact on the Global speciality chemical industry. In India the many speciality chemical companies are members of national organisations such as the Indian Chemical Council (ICC) and the Indian Speciality Chemical Manufacturers' Association (ISCMA). The wide capability of these companies extends into all sectors and sub-sectors of the speciality chemical market.

The United Kingdom has 1300 speciality chemical companies and which have an annual turnover of £11.2 billion. The products of these UK companies are sold globally and contribute significantly to the UKs export trade. With over £30 billion of exports the chemical industry is the last remaining net-exporting manufacturing industry in the UK and Speciality Chemicals make up a significant proportion of this. The products include dyestuffs, paints, explosives, adhesives, flavors and fragrances, photographic chemicals, unrecorded media and various industrial specialities. As Speciality Chemical manufacturers, unlike commodity chemical manufacturers, are less dependent on large scale infrastructure, therefore Speciality Chemical companies can be found in almost all regions of the UK. Some 80% of the United Kingdom Chemical industry is based in the north of the country and consequently there are concentrations of Speciality Chemical companies in Yorkshire, and in the membership of the Northeast of England Process Industry Cluster (NEPIC).

== Product Categories ==
Speciality chemicals can be broadly categorized into the following segments:

1. Adhesives and sealants: These chemicals are used to bond materials together and provide leak-proof sealing in various applications, such as automotive, construction, and packaging.
2. Agrochemicals: Chemicals used in agriculture, including fertilizers, pesticides, herbicides, and fungicides, to enhance crop yield and protect plants from pests and diseases.
3. Catalysts: Substances that increase the rate of chemical reactions without being consumed in the process, widely used in the production of petrochemicals, polymers, and other chemical processes.
4. Coatings: Chemical formulations applied on surfaces to provide protection, appearance enhancement, or specific functional properties like corrosion resistance, water repellency, and UV protection.
5. Electronic chemicals: High-purity chemicals used in the production of electronic components, such as semiconductors, integrated circuits, and printed circuit boards.
6. Flavors and fragrances: Chemicals that impart taste and aroma to food and beverage products, as well as personal care and household products.
7. Food additives: Substances added to food products to enhance their taste, texture, appearance, or preservation.
8. Personal care ingredients: Chemicals used in the formulation of cosmetics, toiletries, and other personal care products, such as emulsifiers, surfactants, and moisturizing agents.
9. Pharmaceuticals: Active ingredients and excipients used in the production of prescription and over-the-counter drugs.
10. Polymers: Large molecules made up of repeating units, used in the production of plastics, elastomers, and resins, with applications across various industries.
11. Surfactants: Compounds that lower surface tension between two liquids or between a liquid and a solid, used in detergents, emulsions, and foaming agents.
12. Textile chemicals: Chemicals used in the processing and finishing of textiles, including dyes, pigments, and fabric softeners.

== See also ==
- Fine chemicals
- Commodity chemicals
- Petrochemicals
- Northeast of England Process Industry Cluster
- Chemical industry
- Commercial classification of chemicals
