= Continued process verification =

Continued process verification (CPV) is the collection and analysis of end-to-end production components and processes data to ensure product outputs are within predetermined quality limits. In 2011 the Food and Drug Administration published a report outlining best practices regarding business process validation in the pharmaceutical industry. Continued process verification is outlined in this report as the third stage in Process Validation.

Its central purpose is to ensure that processes are in a constant state of control, thus ensuring final product quality. Central to effective CPV is a method with which to identify unwanted process inconsistencies in order to execute corrective or preventive measures. Once quality standards are set in place they must be monitored with regular frequency to confirm those parameters are being met. Continued process verification not only helps protect consumers from production faults, but business also see benefits in implementing a CPV program. Should product outputs not match target standards it can be very costly to investigate the problem source without existing CPV data.

== Vital components of continued process verification ==
- An alert system to identify process malfunctions that lead to deviations from quality standards.
- A framework for gathering and analyzing data of final product quality and process consistency. Analysis should include source materials consistency and manufacturing equipment condition; and data should be collected in a format that allows for long-term trend analysis as well as intra-production quality analysis.
- Continued review of quality qualification standards and process reliability. Departures from any predetermined standards should be flagged for review by trained personnel and appropriate measures undertaken to restore end-to-end quality standards.

== Data collection and analysis ==
Crucial in effective CPV implementation is an appropriate data collection procedure. Data must allow for statistical analytics and trend analysis of process consistency and capability. A correctly implemented procedure will minimize overreactions to individual production outlier events and guarantee genuine process inconsistency are detected. While production variability can sometimes be obvious and even casually identified the FDA recommends using statistical tools to quantitatively detect problems and identify root causes. Initially, continued process verification should be based on quality standards established in the design phase. After a period of time variations can be detected by identifying deviation from historical data using statistical tools. Furthermore, these same tools can also be used to identify opportunities to optimize processes that may pre-emptively increase quality reliability.
