= BioDuro =

BioDuro is an American contract research, development, and manufacturing organization (CRDMO) headquartered in Irvine, California. Founded in 1996, the company operates seven R&D and manufacturing campuses across the United States and China and employs more than 2,000 scientists worldwide. BioDuro provides integrated services from discovery through commercial manufacturing, including medicinal chemistry, biology, drug metabolism and pharmacokinetics (DMPK), drug substance, and drug product development. Its capabilities extend across modalities such as small molecules, peptides, oligonucleotides, and antibody–drug conjugates (ADCs).

== History ==
BioDuro was founded in 1996 in the United States as a drug discovery services company. In 2009, it was acquired by Pharmaceutical Product Development (PPD), a leading global contract research organization. In 2020, Advent International merged BioDuro with the China-based CRO Sundia to form BioDuro-Sundia, creating a combined CRDMO serving biotech and pharma clients globally.

In 2021, the company expanded its U.S. operations in Irvine to support clinical and commercial drug product manufacturing. In 2025, BioDuro announced new investments in China, including a Bengbu process development and scale-up site and an OEB-5 high-potency laboratory for ADC payloads and HPAPIs.

== Services and capabilities ==
BioDuro provides end-to-end CRDMO services spanning early discovery through clinical development. Rather than list individual assays or sub-services, the company groups its offerings into several major business units.

=== Discovery chemistry ===
BioDuro’s chemistry division supports medicinal chemistry, hit-to-lead, lead optimization, and synthetic route development. Its laboratories carry out small-molecule synthesis, peptide synthesis, and bioconjugation, including payload–linker development for antibody- drug conjugate (ADC) programs. The chemistry group works closely with DMPK and biology teams to support iterative design and structure- activity relationship (SAR) cycles.

=== Discovery biology ===
The company’s biology division provides assay development, cellular and biochemical assay platforms, pharmacology studies, protein science, and ligand-binding analytics. These capabilities support early-stage target validation, mechanism-of-action studies, and preclinical screening across therapeutic areas commonly explored by biotech companies.

=== DMPK, ADME, and bioanalysis ===
BioDuro conducts in vitro ADME assays, in vivo PK/TK studies, metabolic stability studies, and bioanalytical method development using LC–MS/MS platforms. These services are used to characterize compound absorption, distribution, metabolism, and excretion profiles during preclinical development.

=== Drug product development and manufacturing ===
The company offers formulation development, analytical testing, solid-form screening, and clinical-stage manufacturing for oral and parenteral dosage forms. BioDuro also operates high-potency manufacturing suites for highly potent compounds and cytotoxics.

== Research and innovation ==
BioDuro is involved in developing data-driven and automated workflows intended to accelerate discovery timelines. The company has partnered with technology firms, including Atombeat, to integrate AI-supported peptide-design platforms with high-throughput peptide synthesis and iterative screening workflows. According to the company, these approaches are designed to reduce design–test cycles in peptide and bioconjugate programs; independent evaluation of the platform’s performance is still limited in publicly available literature.

== Global operations ==
BioDuro is headquartered in Irvine, California. The company operates seven research and manufacturing campuses across the United States and China. U.S. and European operations use the BioDuro brand, while China operations use the BioDuro-Sundia brand.
