= Bachem Holding =

Swiss biotechnology company

Bachem Holding AG
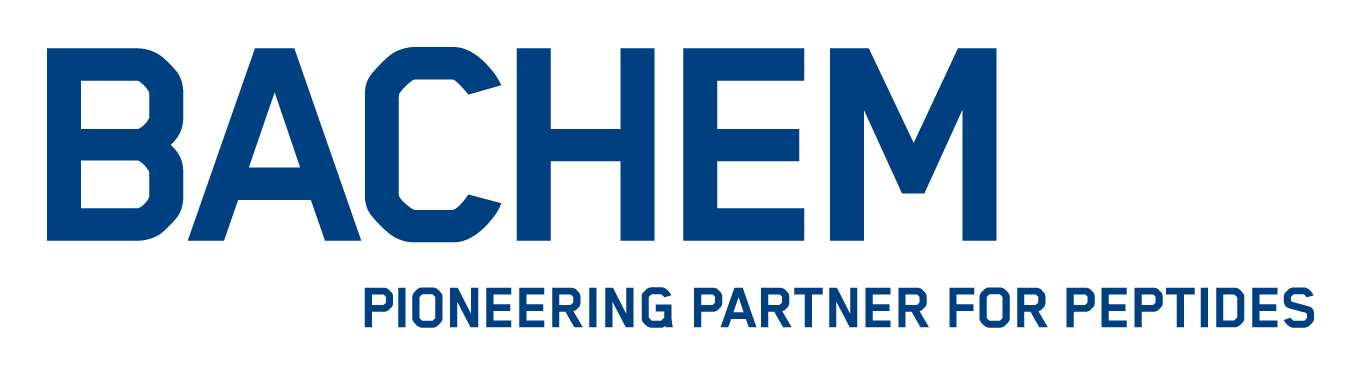

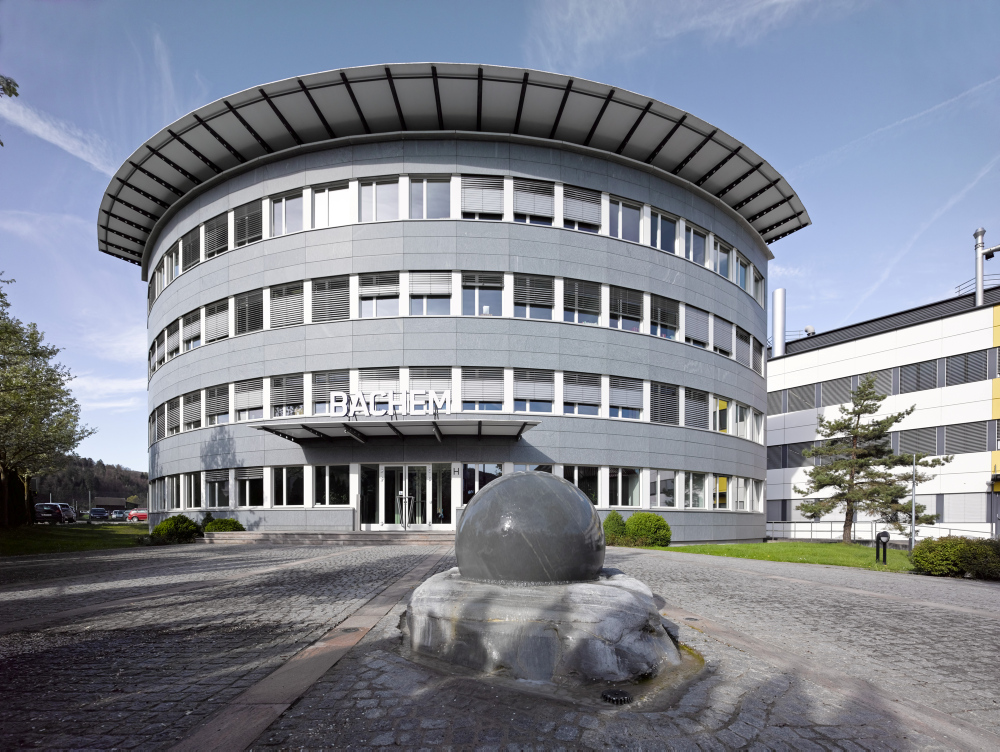
- Offices in Bubendorf, Switzerland
- Company type: Stock company
- Traded as: SIX: BANB
- ISIN: CH0012530207
- Industry: Chemicals, biotechnology, pharmaceuticals
- Founded: 1971
- Headquarters: Bubendorf, Switzerland
- Revenue: CHF 695.1 million (2025)
- Number of employees: 2511
- Website: bachem.com

Bachem Holding AG is a Swiss biotechnology company specializing in the development and manufacture of peptides and complex organic molecules for use as active pharmaceutical ingredients (APIs). The company focuses on peptide-based therapeutics, including large-scale commercial production and process development for pharmaceutical applications. It was founded in 1971 and is a subsidiary of Ingro Finanz AG.

The head office is in Bubendorf in the canton of Basel-Landschaft. Bachem operates production facilities in Vionnaz (Switzerland), Vista and Torrance (United States), and St Helens (United Kingdom), as well as a sales and distribution site in Tokyo.

Bachem is one of the largest manufacturers of peptide-based APIs globally, supplying pharmaceutical and biotechnology companies with products used in both clinical development and commercial therapies.

In recent years, the company has expanded its manufacturing capacity, including new large-scale production facilities in Switzerland and the United States.

At the end of 2025, the company employed 2,511 people, reported revenue of CHF 695.1 million, and net income of CHF 148.8 million.

== History ==
In 2013 the company entered an agreement with GlyTech Inc. to cooperate on the production of glycosylated proteins and peptides.

In 2015 it bought American Peptide, a bio-technology company in Sunnyvale, California.

In the 2020s, Bachem announced and began construction of additional production capacity, including large-scale peptide manufacturing facilities in Bubendorf and the United States.
