= Curt Engelhorn =

German businessman (1926–2016)

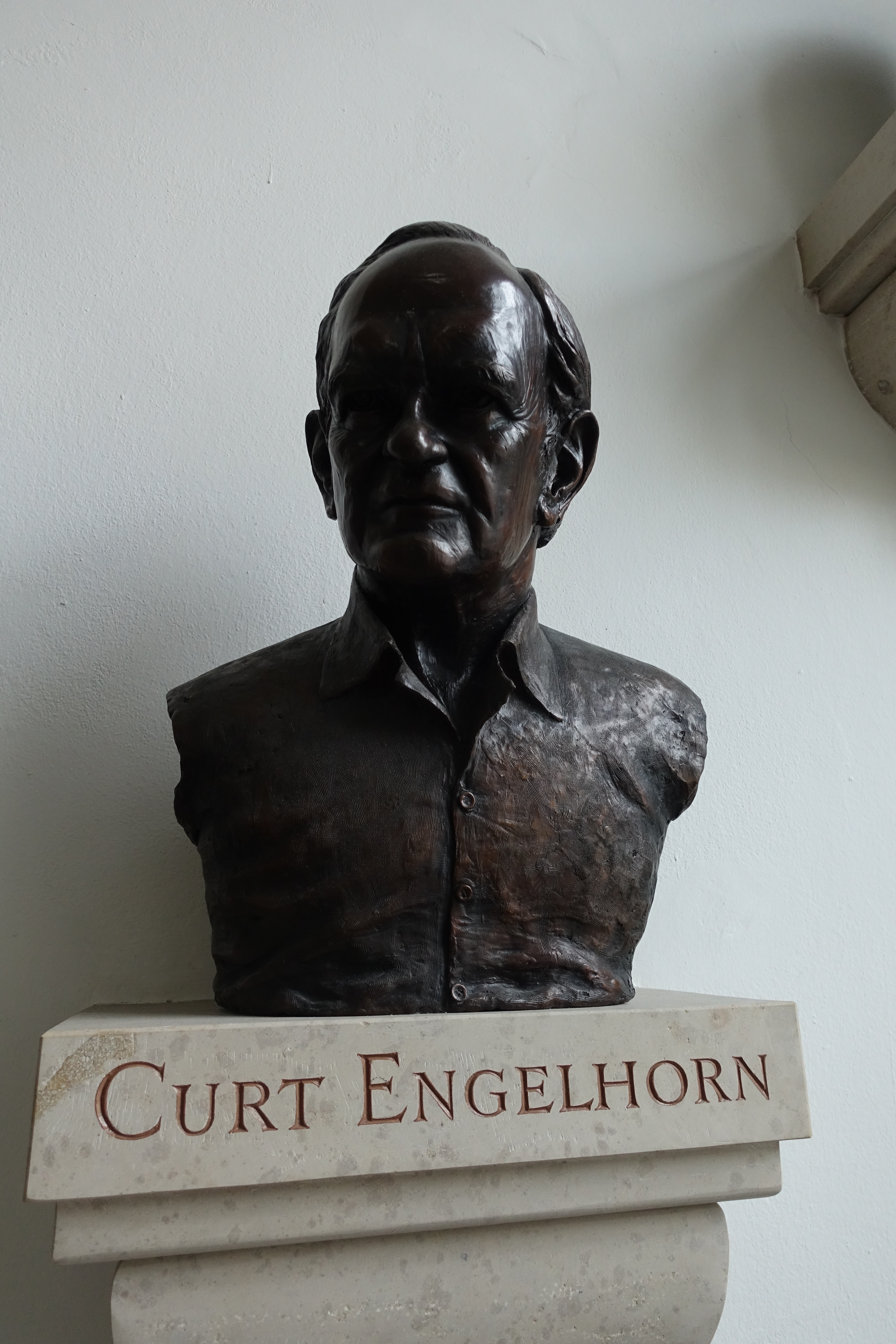
- Bust at the Deutsches Museum
- Born: 25 May 1926; Munich, Germany
- Died: 13 October 2016 (aged 90)
- Education: University of Texas at Austin
- Known for: Former owner, Boehringer Mannheim and DePuy Inc.
- Children: 5
- Relatives: Friedrich Engelhorn (great-grandfather)

Curt Rudolf Glover Engelhorn (25 May 1926 – 13 October 2016) was a German billionaire heir and businessman, the great-grandson of Friedrich Engelhorn, the founder of the chemical company BASF.

== Early life and education ==
Engelhorn was born 25 May 1926 in Munich, Germany to Kurt Maria Engelhorn and Anita Engelhorn (née Schlemmer). He graduated with a bachelor's degree in chemical engineering from the University of Texas at Austin.

== Career ==
Engelhorn led the pharmaceutical companies Boehringer Mannheim and DePuy Inc. for more than three and a half decades. In 1997, he sold the two firms (in which together he had a 40% stake) to Hoffmann-La Roche for more than $10 billion.

In 2008, it was announced that Engelhorn would be donating €400,000 annually over 10 years to support American studies at the Heidelberg Center for American Studies.

Until 2012, Engelhorn owned Five Star Island, Bermuda a major share holding in a Bermuda registered German pharmaceutical multinational Corange Ltd.

Since late 2013, there have been ongoing investigations by the German authorities concerning suspected tax frauds between Engelhorn and his daughters, avoiding capital transfer taxes of up to 440 million euros (US$475 million). As of January 2016, the family's lawyers conceded capital transfer tax evasions in the amount of Euro 135 million (US$145 million) to the court.

== Personal life ==
Engelhorn was the great-grandson of Friedrich Engelhorn, the founder of the German chemical company BASF. He was married with five children and lived in Gstaad, Switzerland, with other homes in Costa Brava, Spain and on the Côte d'Azur, France.

As of March 2016, according to Forbes, Engelhorn had a net worth of $6.2 billion. He died on 13 October 2016, aged 90.

== Other ==
In 2012, it was discovered that an authentic 12th-century cloister had been used as a pool decoration in one of Engelhorn's Spanish estates, hidden from the public and the Spanish conservation authorities for more than half a century.

== See also ==
- List of billionaires
