= Nobel Industries =

Nobel Industries can refer to:

- Nobel Industries (Scotland), a company established by Alfred Nobel in Scotland and merged into Imperial Chemical Industries in 1927
- Nobel Industries (Sweden), a company established by Alfred Nobel in Sweden merged into Akzo Nobel in 1994
