= BASF =

German chemical company

Coordinates: 49°29′46″N 8°25′52″E

BASF SE
- Type: Public
- Traded as: FWB: BAS; DAX component
- ISIN: DE000BASF111
- Industry: Chemicals
- Predecessor: Knoll AG Chemische Fabriken; Zuckerfabrik Körbisdorf; Herbol
- Founded: 6 April 1865; 161 years ago (as Badische Anilin- & Soda-Fabrik); Mannheim, Baden, Germany
- Founder: Friedrich Engelhorn
- Headquarters: Ludwigshafen, Germany
- Key people: Dr. Kurt Bock (chairman); Markus Kamieth (CEO)
- Products: Chemicals, plastics, performance chemicals, catalysts, coatings, crop technology, crude oil and natural gas exploration and production
- Revenue: ▼€68.9 billion (2023)
- Operating income: ▼€2.24 billion (2023)
- Net income: ▲€225 million (2023)
- Total assets: ▼€77.4 billion (2023)
- Total equity: ▼€36.6 billion (2023)
- Number of employees: ▲111,991 (end 2023)
- Subsidiaries: Wintershall, Nunhems, TrinamiX, Cognis, BTC Europe, Chemster, Siegfried PharmaChemikalien Minden, Verenium Corporation, Isobionics, Succinity, Pinturas Thermicas del Norte
- Website: basf.com

BASF SE (German pronunciation: [beːaːɛsˈʔɛf]), an initialism of its original name Badische Anilin- & Soda-Fabrik (German for 'Baden Aniline & Soda Factory'), is a German multinational company and the largest chemical producer in the world. Its headquarters is located in Ludwigshafen, Germany.

BASF comprises subsidiaries and joint ventures in more than 80 countries, operating six integrated production sites and 390 other production sites across Europe, Asia, Australia, the Americas and Africa. BASF has customers in over 190 countries and supplies products to a wide variety of industries. Despite its size and global presence, BASF has received relatively little public attention since it abandoned the manufacture and sale of BASF-branded consumer electronics products in the 1990s.

The company began as a dye manufacturer in 1865. Fritz Haber worked with Carl Bosch, one of its employees, to invent the Haber-Bosch process by 1912, after which the company grew rapidly. In 1925, the company merged with several other German chemical companies to become the chemicals conglomerate IG Farben. IG Farben would go on to play a major role in the economy of Nazi Germany. It extensively employed forced and slave labor during the Nazi period, and produced the notorious Zyklon B chemical used in the Holocaust. IG Farben was disestablished by the Allies in 1945. BASF was reconstituted from the remnants of IG Farben in 1952. It was part of the German economic miracle, and has since expanded considerably. It has received modern criticism for its poor environmental record.

At the end of 2019, the company employed 117,628 people, with over 54,000 in Germany. In 2019, BASF posted sales of €59.3 billion and income from operations before special items of about €4.5 billion. Between 1990 and 2005, the company invested €5.6 billion in Asia, specifically in sites near Nanjing, Shanghai and Zhanjiang in China and Mangalore in India. BASF is listed on the Frankfurt Stock Exchange, London Stock Exchange, and Zurich Stock Exchange. The company delisted its ADR from the New York Stock Exchange in September 2007. The company is a component of the Euro Stoxx 50 stock market index.

== History ==
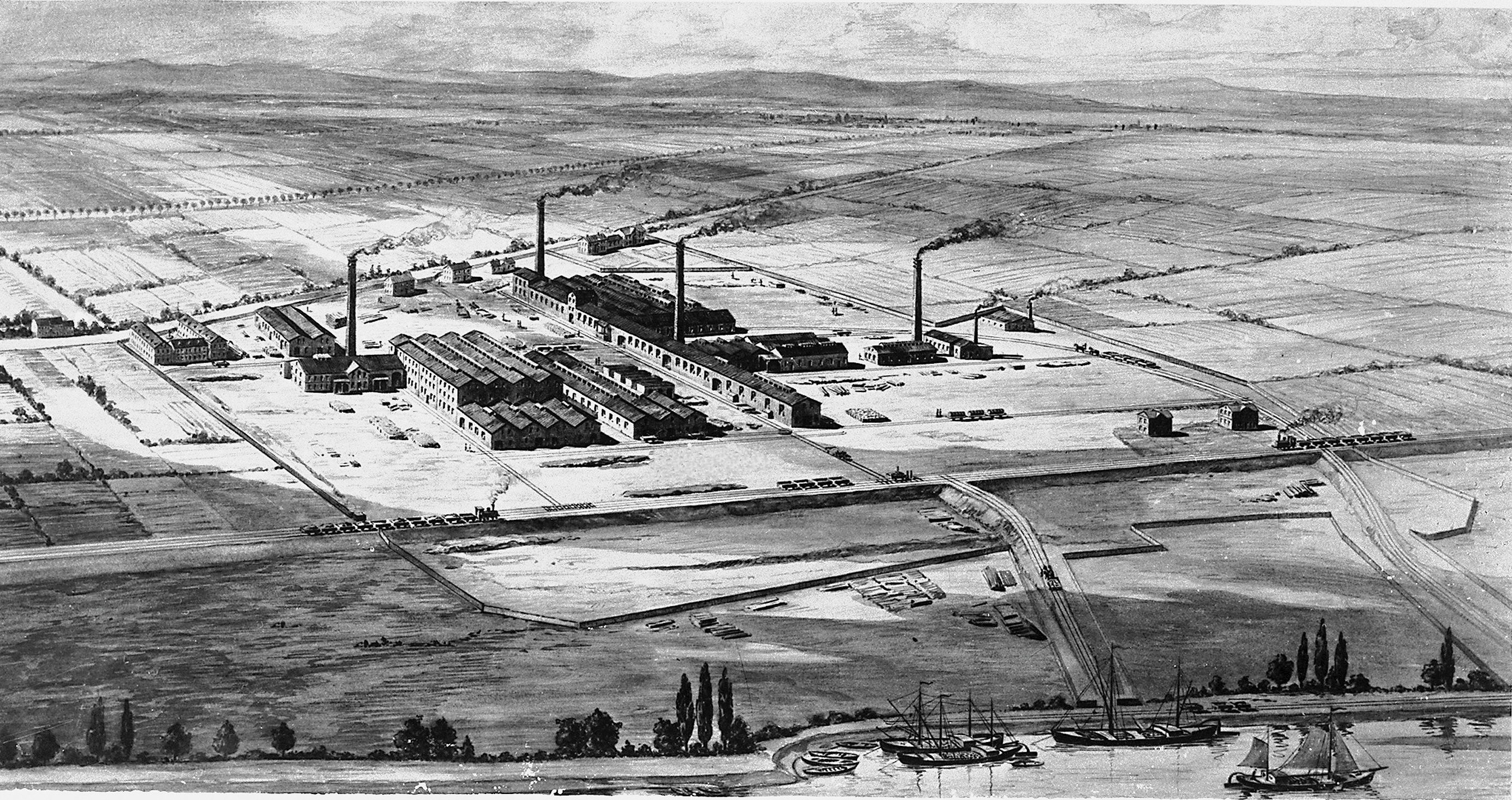
BASF plant in Ludwigshafen, 1865

BASF is an acronym for Badische Anilin- und Sodafabrik (German for 'Baden Aniline and Soda Factory'). It was founded by Friedrich Engelhorn on 6 April 1865 in Mannheim, in the German-speaking state of Baden. Engelhorn had been responsible for setting up a gasworks and street lighting for the town council in 1861. The gasworks produced tar as a by-product from coal, and Engelhorn used this to extract aniline for the production of dyes.

BASF was set up in 1865, to produce other chemicals necessary for dye production, notably soda and acids. The plant, however, was erected on the other side of the Rhine river at Ludwigshafen because the town council of Mannheim was afraid that the air pollution from the chemical plant could bother the inhabitants of the town. In 1866, the dye production processes were also moved to the BASF site.

=== Aniline dyes (1869) ===
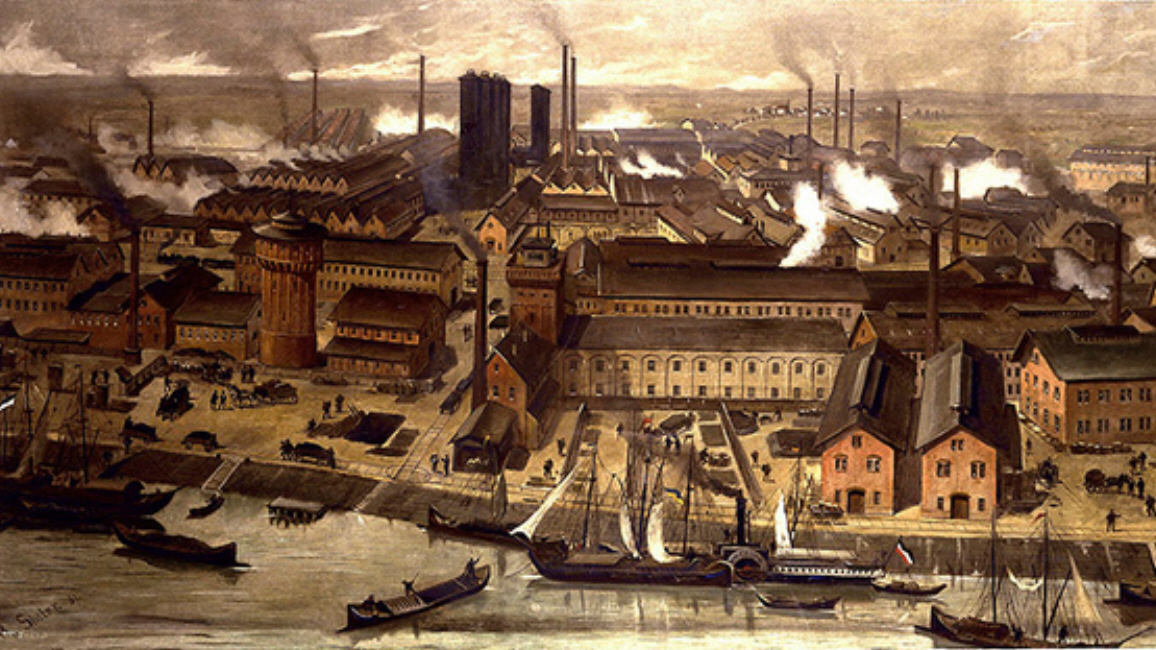
BASF plant in Ludwigshafen, 1881

The discovery in 1857 by William Henry Perkin that aniline could be used to make intense colouring agents had led to the commercial production of synthetic dyes in England from aniline extracted from coal tar. BASF recruited Heinrich Caro, a German chemist with experience of the dyestuff industry in England, to be the first head of research. Caro developed a synthesis for alizarin (a red dye used for dying textile fabrics) and applied for a British patent on 25 June 1869. Coincidentally, Perkin applied for a virtually identical patent on 26 June 1869, and the two companies came to a mutual commercial agreement about the process.

Further patents were granted for the synthesis of methylene blue and eosin, and in 1880, research began to try to find a synthetic process for indigo dye, though this was not successfully brought to the market until 1897. In 1901, some 80% of the BASF production was dyestuffs.

=== Solvay process soda (1880) ===
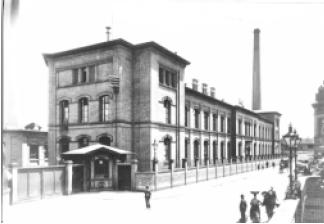
BASF main laboratory in Ludwigshafen, 1887

Sodium carbonate (soda) was produced by the Leblanc process until 1880, when the much cheaper Solvay process became available. BASF ceased to make its own and bought it from the Solvay company thereafter.

=== Knietsch sulfuric acid (1890) ===
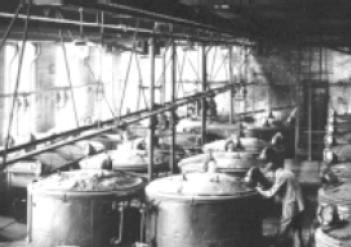
Indigo production at BASF in 1890

Sulfuric acid was initially produced by the lead chamber process, but in 1890, a unit using the contact process was brought on stream, producing the acid at higher concentration (98% instead of 80%) and a lower cost. This development followed extensive research and development by Rudolf Knietsch, for which he received the Liebig Medal in 1904.

=== Haber's ammonia (1913) ===
The development of the Haber process from 1908 to 1912, made it possible to synthesize ammonia (a major industrial chemical as the primary source of nitrogen), and, after acquiring exclusive rights to the process, in 1913, BASF started a new production plant in Oppau, adding fertilizers to its product range. BASF also acquired and began mining anhydrite for gypsum at the Kohnstein in 1917.

=== World War I ===
In 1916, BASF started operations at a new site in Leuna, where explosives were produced during the First World War. On 21 September 1921, an explosion occurred in Oppau, killing 565 people. The Oppau explosion was the biggest industrial accident in German history.

=== IG Farben (1921) ===
Company scrip from Badische Anilin- & Soda-Fabrik, 2 Pfennig Gutschein, ca. 1918

Under the leadership of Carl Bosch, BASF founded IG Farben with Hoechst, Bayer, and three other companies, thus losing its independence. BASF was the nominal survivor, as all shares were exchanged for BASF shares before the merger. Rubber, fuels, and coatings were added to the range of products. In 1935, IG Farben and AEG presented the magnetophon – the first tape recorder – at the Radio Exhibition in Berlin.

=== World War II ===
After the appointment of Adolf Hitler as chancellor in 1933, IG Farben cooperated with the National Socialist government, profiting from guaranteed volumes and prices and, in time, from forced ("unfree") labour provided through governmental concentration camps. BASF (leader of the chemical industry of the IG Farben) built a 24 km^{2} chemical factory in Auschwitz named "IG Auschwitz", the largest chemical factory in the world at the time. IG Farben became notorious through its production of Zyklon-B, the lethal gas used to kill prisoners in German extermination camps during the Holocaust.

IG Farben made extensive use of forced labor during WWII consisting mostly of drafted "service-duty" Germans, foreign workers from German-occupied territories, and prisoners of war. By 1943, nearly one-half of all IG Farben workers were forced laborers housed in factory-camp facilities. This number did not include the 51,445 concentration camp laborers supplied by the Nazis. Spread out over 23 facilities, it is estimated that 31,500–33,500 of those concentration camp inmates were killed by authorities or died from starvation, exhaustion, or disease.

The Ludwigshafen site was almost completely destroyed during the Second World War but was subsequently rebuilt. The allies dissolved IG Farben in November 1945.

Both the Ludwigshafen and Oppau plants were of strategic importance for the war because the German military needed many of their products (e.g., synthetic rubber and gasoline). As a result, they were major targets for air raids. During the war, Allied bombers attacked the plants a total of 65 times.

Bombing took place from the autumn of 1943 and saturation bombing inflicted extensive damage. Production virtually stopped by the end of 1944.

Due to a shortage of male workers during the war, women were conscripted to work in the factories, joined later by prisoners of war and foreign civilians. Concentration camp inmates did not work at the Ludwigshafen and Oppau plants.

In July 1945, the American military administration confiscated all IG Farben assets. That same year, the Allied Commission decreed that IG Farben should be dissolved. The sites at Ludwigshafen and Oppau were controlled by French authorities.

=== BASF refounded (1952) ===
On 28 July 1948, an explosion occurred at a BASF site in Ludwigshafen, killing 207 people and injuring 3818. In 1952, BASF was refounded under its name following the efforts of former Nazi Party member Carl Wurster, who served in Nazi Germany as Wehrwirtschaftsführer (war economy leader). With the German economic miracle in the 1950s, BASF added synthetics such as nylon to its product range. BASF developed Polystyrene in the 1930s and invented Styropor in 1951.

=== Post-WW2 20th century ===
In the 1960s, production abroad was expanded and plants were built in Argentina, Australia, Belgium, Brazil, France, India, Italy, Japan, Mexico, Spain, United Kingdom and the United States. Following a change in corporate strategy in 1965, greater emphasis was placed on higher-value products such as coatings, pharmaceuticals, pesticides and fertilizers. Following German reunification, BASF acquired a site in Schwarzheide, Eastern Germany, on 25 October 1990.

In 1968, BASF (together with Bayer AG) bought the German coatings company Herbol. BASF completely took over the Herbol branches in Cologne and Würzburg in 1970. Under new management, the renewal and expansion of the trademark continued. After an extensive reorganisation and an increasing international orientation of the coatings business, Herbol became part of the new founded Deco GmbH in 1997.

BASF bought the Wyandotte Chemical Company, and its Geismar, Louisiana chemical plant in the early 1970s. The plant produced plastics, herbicides, and antifreeze. BASF soon tried to operate union-free, having already reduced or eliminated union membership in several other US plants. Challenging the Geismar OCAW union resulted in a labor dispute that saw members locked out from 1984 to 1989, and eventually winning their case. A worker solidarity committee at BASF's headquarters plant in Ludwigshafen, Germany, took donations from German workers to support the American strikers and organized rallies and publicity in support. The dispute was the subject of an academic study. The union also exposed major accidental releases of phosgene, toluene and other toxic gases, these being publicized in the local media and through a video, Out of Control. A court threw out a $66,700 fine against BASF for five environmental violations as "too small".

BASF's European coatings business was taken over by AkzoNobel in 1999.

=== 21st century ===
Northern part of the BASF site in Ludwigshafen, Germany

BASF bought the Engelhard Corporation for $4.8 billion in 2006. Other acquisitions in 2006, were the purchase of Johnson Polymer and the construction chemicals business of Degussa. The acquisition of Johnson Polymer was completed on 1 July 2006. The purchase price was $470 million on a cash and debt-free basis. It provided BASF with a range of water-based resins that complements its portfolio of high solids and UV resins for the coatings and paints industry and strengthened the company's market presence, particularly in North America. The acquisition of Degussa AG's construction chemicals business was completed in 2006. The purchase price for equity was about €2.2 billion. In addition, the transaction was associated with a debt of €500 million. The company agreed to acquire Ciba (formerly part of Ciba-Geigy) in September 2008. The proposed deal was reviewed by the European Commissioner for Competition. On 9 April 2009, the acquisition was officially completed.

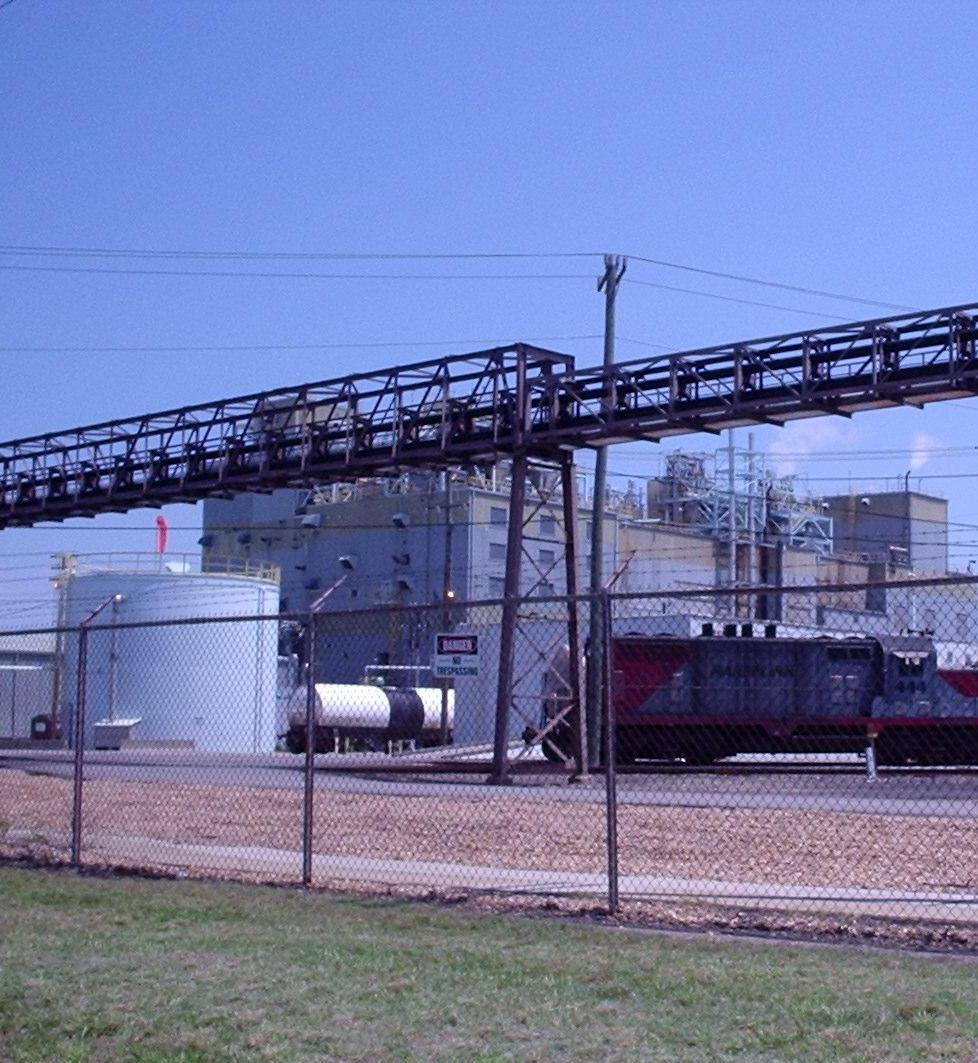
BASF Portsmouth Site in the West Norfolk area of Portsmouth, Virginia, United States. The plant is served by the Commonwealth Railway.

On 19 December 2008, BASF acquired U.S.-based Whitmire Micro-Gen together with U.K.-based Sorex Ltd. Sorex is a manufacturer of branded chemical and non-chemical products for professional pest management. In March 2007 Sorex was put up for sale with a price tag of about £100 million.

In December 2010, BASF completed the acquisition of Cognis. In May 2015, BASF agreed to sell parts of its pharmaceutical ingredients business to Swiss drug manufacturer Siegfried Holding AG for a fee of €270 million, including assumed debt.

In 2016, BASF announced the sale of its polyolefin catalysts group to W.R. Grace. BASF announced that the transaction would allow the company to focus on its chemical and refinery catalysts business.

Since 2016, BASF has partnered with a subsidiary of Xinjiang Zhongtai Group, a company sanctioned under the Uyghur Forced Labor Prevention Act, to operate a plant in Korla. In October 2017, BASF announced it would buy seed and herbicide businesses from Bayer for €5.9 billion ($7 billion), as part of Bayer's acquisition of Monsanto.

The company announced the start of a US$10 billion investment project in the south-western Chinese city of Zhanjiang, in November 2019. The project was approved in 2022. This ″Verbund″ site is intended for the production of engineering plastics and TPU. The site would be the third-largest BASF site worldwide, following Ludwigshafen, Germany, and Antwerp, Belgium. The first plant started up in 2022, and the entire site is expected to be completed by 2030.

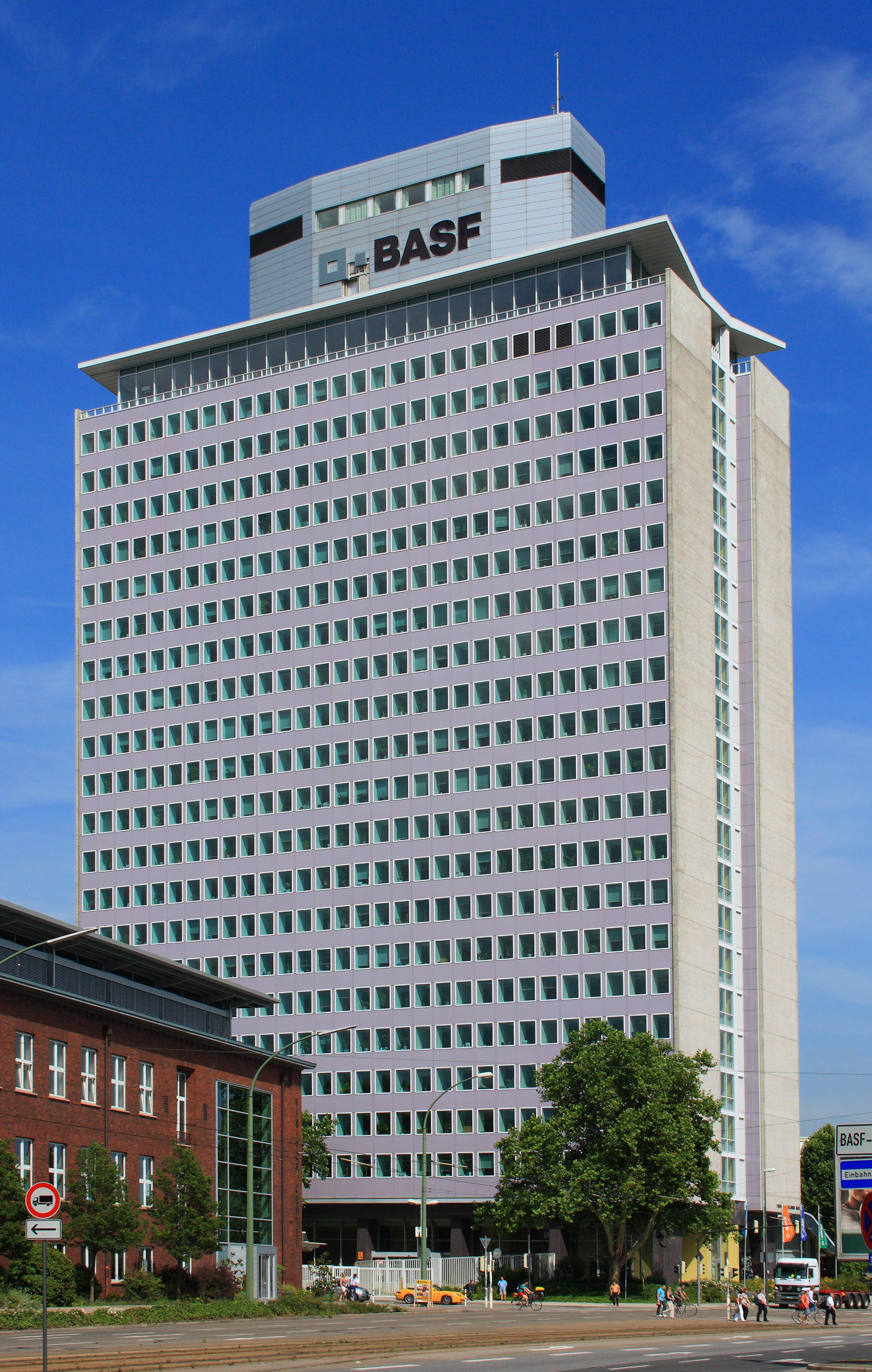
Former BASF headquarters building in Ludwigshafen

In August 2019, BASF agreed to sell its global pigments business to Japanese fine chemical company DIC for €1.15 billion ($1.28 billion) on a cash and debt-free basis.

In September 2019, BASF signed an agreement with DuPont Safety & Construction, a subsidiary business unit of DuPont, to sell its ultrafiltration membrane business, Inge GmbH. According to BASF executives, Inge GmbH and its products fit better with DuPont and their business strategy.

In February 2023, BASF announced that the company is planning to close one of its two ammonia factories at its site in Ludwigshafen, this comes as part of the companies plans to cut costs as the organisation has struggled with high energy costs. The result of the organisations plans will lead to increased production in China while resulting in the loss of 2,600 jobs. The Zhanjiang plant extends over 400 hectares and serves mainly the electronic industry and the automotive industry. In September 2023 BASF broke ground on its Zhanjiang syngas plant; the plant was due to be commissioned by 2025. In November 2023 the firm closed a $5bn 15-year investment deal in China, with Chinese banks.

As of April 2023, BASF had 30 production facilities in China. CEO Martin Brudermüller held that Chinese revenue is essential to grow his European business in the face of "Europe’s high energy costs and stringent environmental rules."

== Past activity ==
With the help of then German Chancellor Gerhard Schröder, BASF's Jürgen Hambrecht signed the Gazprom Nord Stream-Yuzhno-Russkoye deal in 2004 with a 49-51 structure, as opposed to the older 50-50 split of for example BP's TNK-BP project. Putin at the time insisted on majority Russian ownership of any joint-venture in Russian territory since that time.

BASF expanded to Podolsk, Russia, in 2012, and to Kazan in 2013.

== Notable lawsuit ==
=== Dicamba lawsuit ===
On 27 January 2020, the first-ever lawsuit concerning Dicamba-related products began in Cape Girardeau, Missouri. The lawsuit involved a peach farmer who alleged that Dicamba-based herbicides caused significant damage to his crops and trees. It had also been filed in November 2016, when Dicamba was still owned by Monsanto. On 14 February 2020, the jury involved in the lawsuit ruled against BASF and its co-defendant Bayer, which had acquired Monsanto and its products, and found in favor of the peach grower, Bader Farms owner Bill Bader. BASF and Bayer were also ordered to pay Bader $15 million in damages. On 15 February 2020, Monsanto and BASF were ordered to pay an additional $250 million in punitive damages.

== Finances ==
For the fiscal year 2017, BASF reported earnings of €6.1 billion, with an annual revenue of €64.5 billion, an increase of 12% over the previous fiscal cycle. BASF's shares traded at over €69 per share, and its market capitalization was valued at €63.7 billion in November 2018. In October 2019, BASF reported a drop of operating income for July to September amounting to 24 percent, along with a drop in EBIT earnings of €1.1 billion ($1.2 billion). The US–China trade war as well as uncertainties related to Brexit were identified as contributing factors. However, overall third quarter profit beat expectations as the acquisition of Bayer AG's agrochemical and seed business help to offset some of the effects of the trade war.

Year	Revenue in bn. €	Net income in bn. €	Total assets in bn. €	Employees
2013	73.973	4.842	64.382	112,206
2014	74.326	5.155	71.359	113,292
2015	70.449	3.987	70.836	112,435
2016	57.550	4.056	76.496	113,830
2017	61.223	6.078	78.768	115,490
2018	62.675	4.707	86.556	122,404
2019	59.316	8.421	86.950	117,628
2020	59.149	−1.060	80.292	110,302
2021	78.598	5.523	87.383	111,047
2022	87.327	−0.627	84.472	111,481
2023	68.902	0.225	77.395	111,991
2024	65.260	1.298	83.030	111,822
2025	59.657	1.434	78.021	108,251

== Business segments and leadership ==
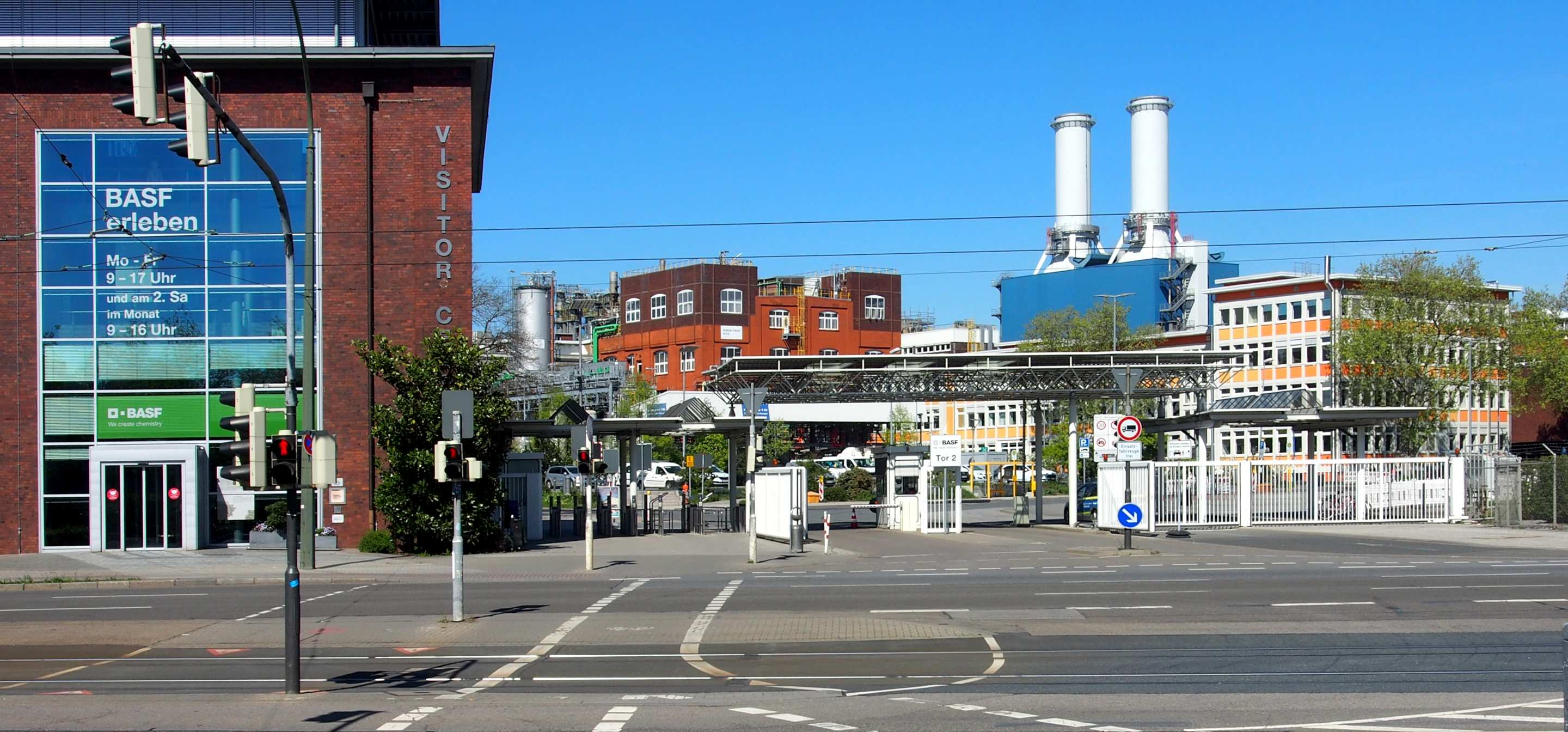
BASF visitor center, Ludwigshafen, Germany

BASF operates in a variety of markets. As of 2020 its business is organized in the segments of Chemicals, Plastics, Performance Products, Functional Solutions, Agricultural Solutions, and Oil and Gas.

=== Chemicals ===
BASF produces a wide range of chemicals such as solvents, amines, resins, glues, electronic-grade chemicals, industrial gases, basic petrochemicals, and inorganic chemicals. The most important customers for this segment are the pharmaceutical, construction, textile, and automotive industries.

=== Plastics ===
BASF's plastic products include high-performance materials in thermoplastics, foams, and urethanes.

Engineering Plastics
BASF's Engineering Plastics consists of the "4 Ultras" – Ultramid polyamide (PA) nylon-based resins, Ultradur, polybutylene terephthalate (PBT), Ultraform, polyacetal (POM), and Ultrason, polysulfone (PSU) and polyethersulfone (PES).

Styrenics
BASF Styrenics consists of the Foams and Copolymers. BASF's styrenic copolymers have applications in electronics, building and construction, and automotive components. In 2011 BASF and Ineos blended their global business activities in the fields of styrene monomers (SM), polystyrene (PS), acrylonitrile butadiene styrene (ABS), styrene butadiene copolymers (SBC) and other styrene-based copolymers (SAN, AMSAN, ASA, MABS) into a joint venture named Styrolution.

Polyurethanes
BASF's Polyurethanes business consists of diverse technologies and finished products. Urethane chemicals are raw materials used in rigid and flexible foams commonly used for insulation in the construction and appliance industries, furniture, packaging, and transportation.

Foams
Foams like Styropor are generally used as insulating materials. They are eco-efficient and offer advantages over other materials in terms of cost-effectiveness, preservation of resources and environmental protection. Investments made for insulating materials usually pay for themselves within a short time and contribute to retaining and even enhancing the value of buildings.

Polyamides and Intermediates
BASF manufactures polyamide precursors and polyamide.

Biodegradable plastics
BASF developed a biodegradable plastic with a high content of polylactic acid.

=== Performance products ===
BASF produces a range of performance chemicals, coatings and functional polymers. These include raw materials for detergents, textile and leather chemicals, pigments and raw materials for adhesives, paper chemicals. Customers are the automotive, oil, paper, packaging, textile, sanitary products, detergents, construction materials, coatings, printing, and leather industries.

=== Functional Solutions ===
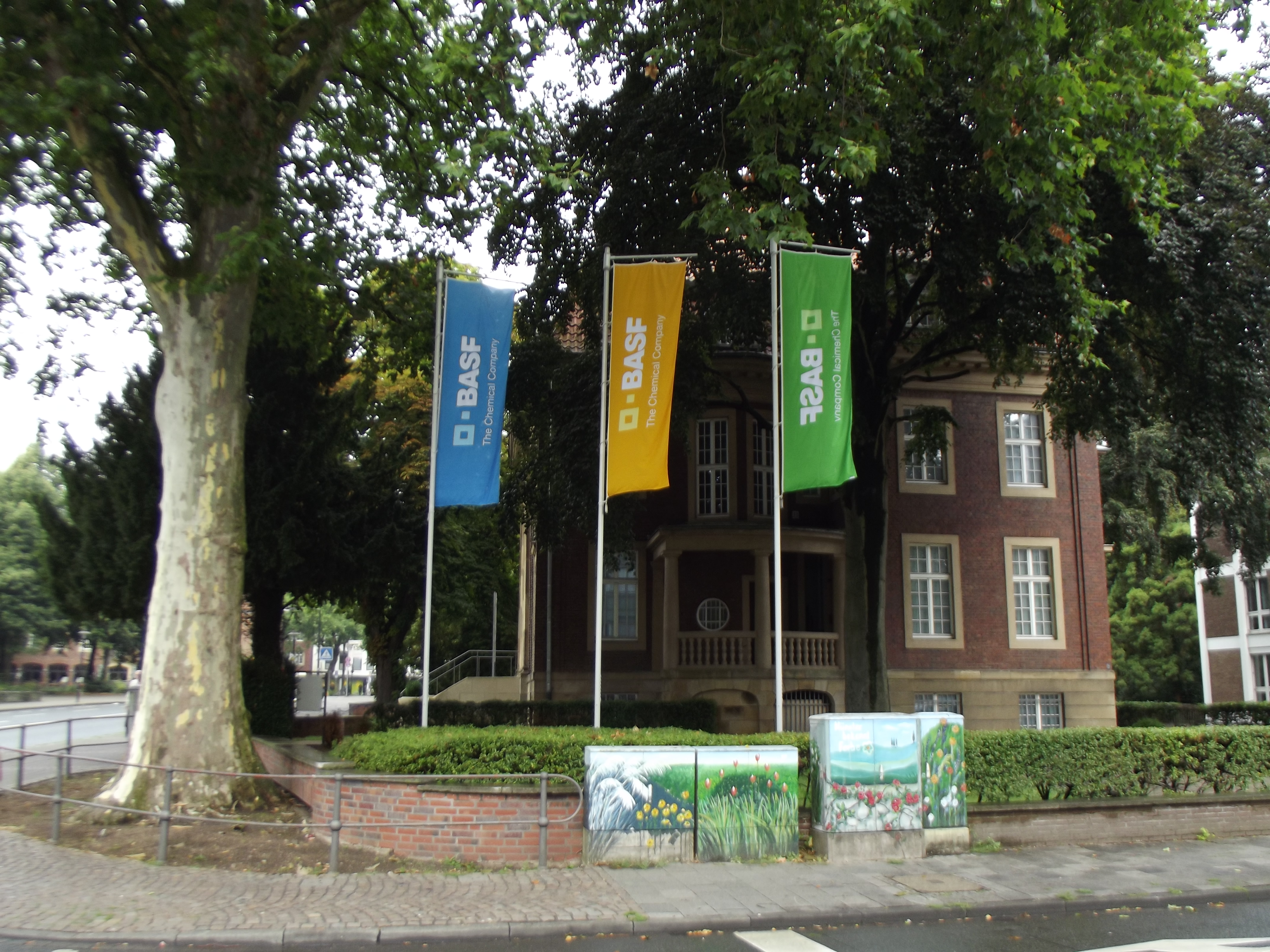
BASF-sponsored Museum for Lacquerware in Münster, Germany

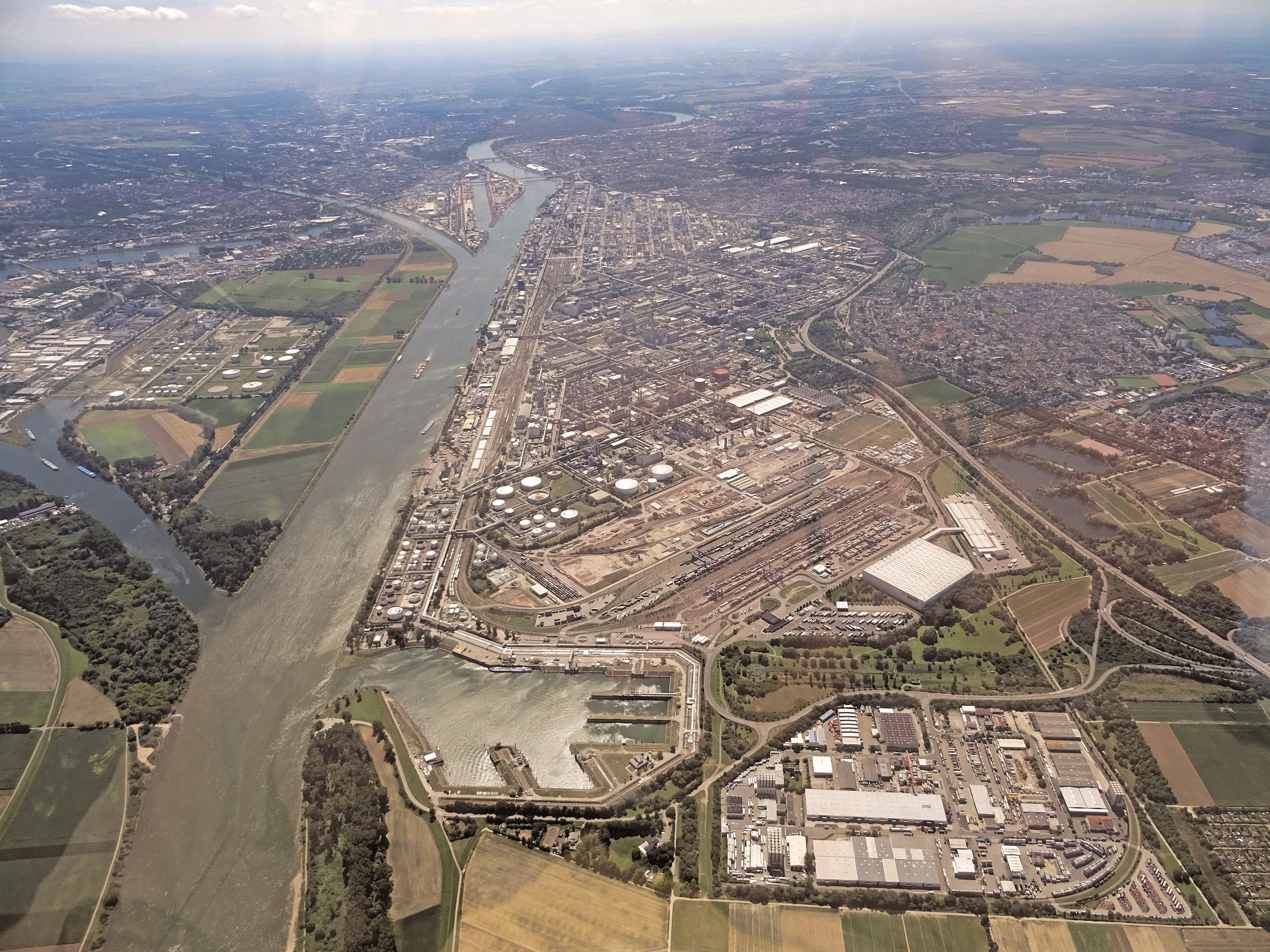
BASF in Ludwigshafen

BASF's Functional Solutions segment consists of the Catalysts, Construction Chemicals and Coatings divisions. These divisions develop customer-specific products, in particular for the automotive and construction industries.

=== Agricultural ===
BASF supplies agricultural products and chemicals including fungicides, herbicides, insecticides and seed treatment products. The company also researches nutrigenomics. BASF opened a new crop protection technology center in Limburgerhof, Germany in 2016.

=== Biotechnology ===
BASF was cooperating with Monsanto Company in research, development and marketing of biotechnology. In correlation to this work, BASF has licensed many gene editing tools including CRISPR Cas9 and CRISPR Cas12a (Cpf1).

The BASF Plant Science subsidiary produces the Amflora and Starch Potato genetically modified potato with reduced amylose. In 2010 BASF conducted Department of Environment, Food and Rural Affairs approved trials of genetically modified potatoes in the United Kingdom. Starch Potato was authorised for use in the USA in 2014.

Other GM crops are Phytaseed Canola varieties with phytase, sulfonylurea herbicide tolerant soybean and drought tolerant corn (with cold shock protein B) developed with Monsanto.

=== Oil and gas ===
BASF explores for and produces oil and gas through its subsidiary Wintershall Dea.

=== Leadership ===
Each of the divisions of BASF has a president. They are governed by a chairman and CEO.

- Friedrich Engelhorn
- Heinrich von Brunck
- Carl Bosch
- Carl Wurster
- Bernhard Timm
- Matthias Seefelder
- Jürgen Strube 1990-2003
- Jürgen Hambrecht 2003-2011
- Kurt Bock 2011-2018
- Martin Brudermüller 2018-2024
- Markus Kamieth 2024–present

== Investors ==
75% of the BASF shares are held by institutional investors (BlackRock more than 5%). 36% of the shares are held in Germany, 11% in the UK and 17% in the U.S.

== Production ==
BASF's recent success is characterized by a focus on creating resource efficient product lines after completely abandoning consumer products. This strategy was reflected in production by a re-focus towards integrated production sites. The largest such integrated production site is located in Ludwigshafen employing 33,000 people.

Integrated production sites are characterized by co-location of many individual production lines (producing a specific chemical), which share an interconnected material flow. Piping is used ubiquitously for volume materials. All production lines use common raw material sourcing and feed back waste resources, which can be used elsewhere (e.g. steam of various temperatures, sulfuric acid, carbon monoxide). The economic incentive for this approach is high resource and energy efficiency of the overall process, reduced shipping cost and associated reduced risk of accidents. Due to the high cost of such an integrated production site, it establishes a high entry barrier for competitors trying to enter the market for volume chemicals.

BASF built a new chemical complex in Dahej, Gujarat at a cost of $100 million. This facility has South Asia's first methylene diphenyl diisocyanate (MDI) splitter for processing crude MDI. BASF has 8 production facilities in India.

BASF SE has succeeded in developing a semi-crystalline polyamide that allows light to pass through largely unhindered, known as Ultramid.

Ludwigshafen production site

== Environmental record ==
According to the 2022 "Top 100 Polluters Indexes" published by the University of Massachusetts, Amherst's "Political Economy Research Institute" (PERI), BASF was ranked the #2 largest polluter of air and #14 largest polluter of water in 2020, the most recent year for which data is available from the U.S. Environmental Protection Agency.

In 2006, BASF was included in the Climate Leadership Index for their efforts in relation to climate change and greenhouse gas emissions.

The BASF Company and Columbia University formed a partnership to further research "environmentally benign and sustainable energy sources". The company has recently reported their emissions in 2006 to be "1.50 million metric tons of waste," which is a decrease from previous years. The amount of waste BASF produces has continued to fall.

While BASF publishes its environmental information in the US and Europe, Greenpeace has expressed deep concerns at BASF's refusal to release environmental information on its operations in China.

In May 2009, a BASF Plant in Hannibal, Missouri, United States, accidentally discharged chromium into the Mississippi River. The local Department of Natural Resources performed tests in December 2009 showing the chromium levels did not exceed regulatory safety limits. BASF worked with the Missouri Department of Natural Resources (MoDNR) to resolve questions regarding the elevated level of hexavalent chromium that was detected in the effluent from one of its permitted outfalls into the Mississippi River. The state department of health reviewed the test results and determined that the amounts found were well below recommended public health screening levels.

In 2013, BASF reported a spill of several hundred kilogrammes of the chelating agent Trilon-B (tetrasodium EDTA) into the river Rhine from BASF's headquarters in Ludwigshafen, Germany. BASF has instituted an eco-efficiency analysis to promote green engineering principles.

== See also ==
- Ineos
- Dow Chemical Company
- Union Carbide
- Sculpteo
