= Kurt Bock =

German businessman (born 1958)

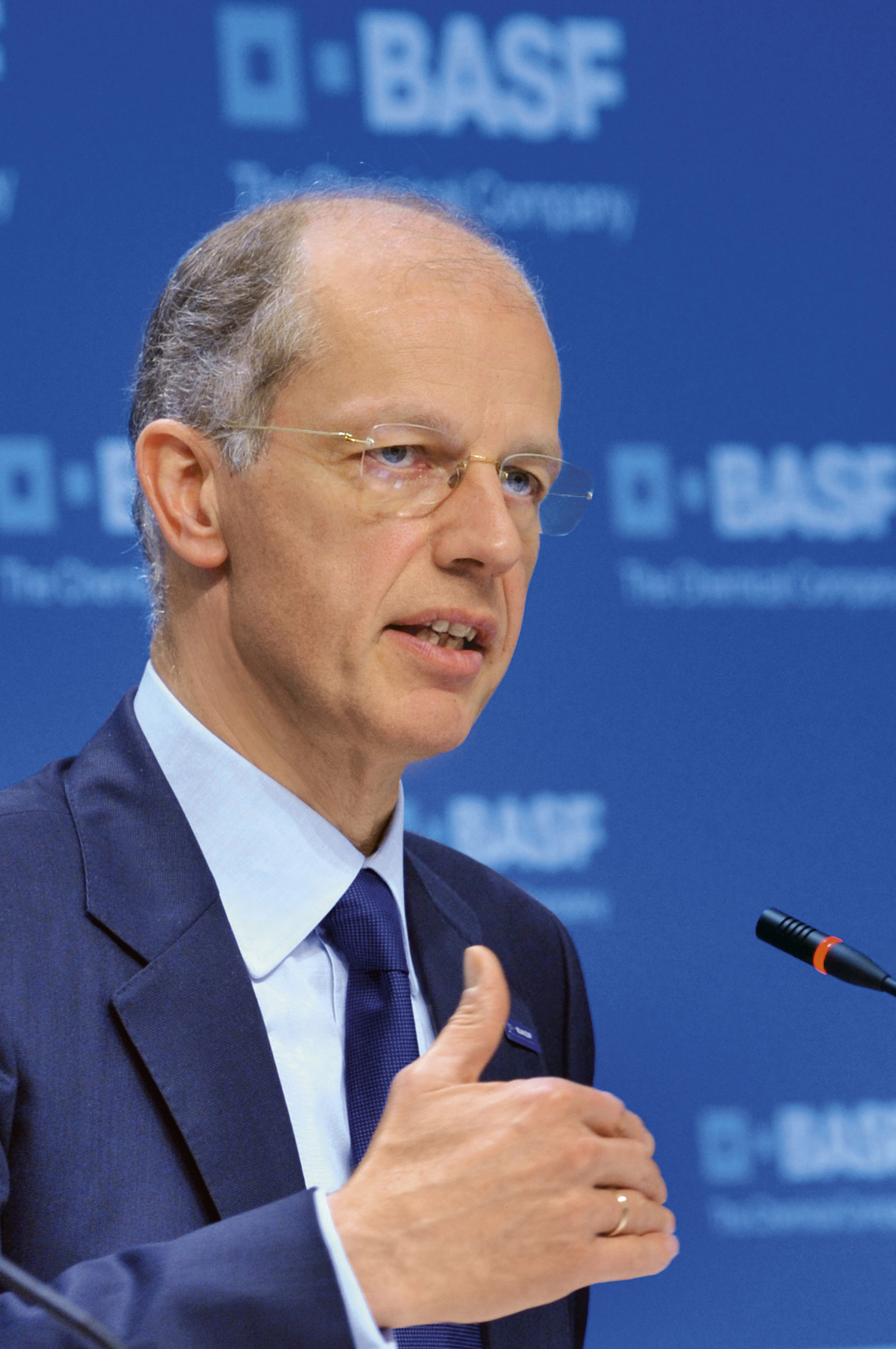
- Bock in 2013
- Born: 3 July 1958 (age 68); Rahden, Eastern Westphalia, West Germany
- Education: Pennsylvania State University; University of Münster; University of Bonn
- Title: Former CEO, BASF
- Term: 2011-18
- Predecessor: Jürgen Hambrecht
- Successor: Martin Brudermüller
- Spouse: married
- Children: 3

Kurt Bock (born 3 July 1958), is a German businessman who has been president of the German Chemical Industry Association since 2016, and was chief executive officer (CEO) of BASF, the world's largest chemical producer, from 2011 to 2018.

== Early life ==
Bock was born in 1958, in Rahden, Eastern Westphalia, West Germany.

Bock studied business administration at the University of Münster, University of Cologne and Pennsylvania State University, and received his doctorate in economics from the University of Bonn in 1985. He wrote his thesis on "Corporate success and organization".

== Career ==
Bock joined the finance division of BASF in 1985, after he earned his doctorate (PhD) in economics from the University of Bonn. In 1992, he joined Bosch as head of the finance and balance division. Later he took over the management of the Brazilian subsidiary.

In 1998, Bock returned to BASF and was first chief financial officer of the US subsidiary. In 2000, he became head of logistics and IT at the BASF parent company. In 2003, he was appointed to the executive board of BASF AG with responsibility for the finance department. In 2007, he also assumed responsibility as chairman and CEO of BASF Corporation, New Jersey, US.

Bock became chief executive of BASF in May 2011. He served as CEO until resigning from the board at the end of the annual general meeting on May 4, 2018. He was succeeded by Martin Brudermüller.

Bock is assumed to be elected as chairman of the BASF supervisory board after the expiration of the mandatory two-year cooling-off period in 2020.

In March 2013, Bock advocated inside BASF to renounce the formal use of academic titles in corporate language and correspondence.

In September 2012, Bock was elected as chairman of the European Chemical Industry Council. From 2013 to 2014, he headed the International Council of Chemical Associations ICCA. He has been a member of the executive board and the Presidium of the German Chemical Industry Association since autumn 2012. In September 2016, he was elected as its president. The term of office runs for two years, up to the next general meeting in 2018.

Bock is also a member of the joint advisory council of the Allianz companies.

== Other activities ==
- Baden-Badener Unternehmer-Gespräche (BBUG), Member of the Executive Board
- Stifterverband für die Deutsche Wissenschaft, Vice-President

== Personal life ==
Bock is married, with three children.

Business positions
Preceded by Jürgen Hambrecht	Chief Executive of BASF; May 2011 – May 2018	Succeeded by Martin Brudermüller
