= Herbol =

German industrial coating brand

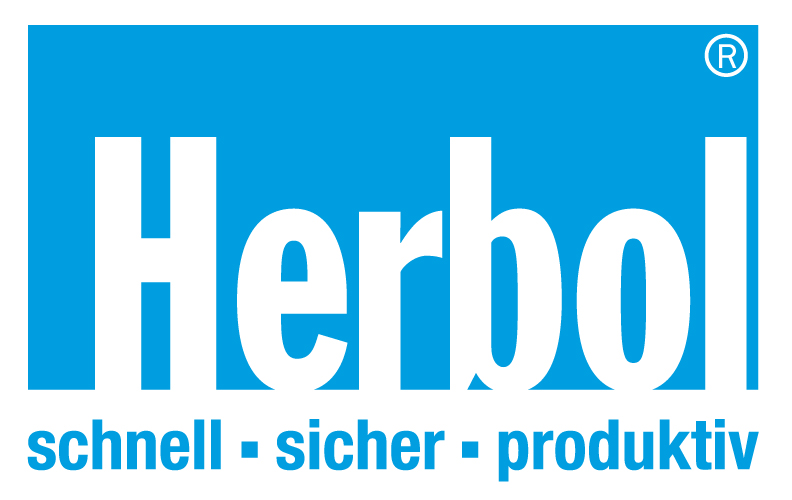
- Company type: GmbH
- Industry: chemical industry manufacture of paints, varnishes and similar coatings, printing ink a mastics
- Founded: 1844
- Defunct: 1970
- Successor: BASF
- Headquarters: Cologne
- Key people: Thomas Biermann, Isabel Casimiro, Kees Ekelmans (business leaders), Helmut Twilfer (Chairman of supervisory board)
- Products: Building paints, lacquers and glazes
- Website: www.herbol.de

Herbol is one of the oldest German brands for professional coatings. It has its origins in the Lackfabrik Herbig-Haarhaus that was founded in Cologne in 1844. The product range contains façade paints, interior wall paints, lacquers and glazing, crack reinforcement as well as concrete and floor system. The coatings systems are used for renovation, maintenance and new constructions. Since 1999 the brand Herbol is part of the Akzo Nobel Deco GmbH, an affiliate of the Dutch concern AkzoNobel, the world's biggest coatings manufacturer.

== History ==
=== Beginnings ===
In 1844 Robert Friedrich Haarhaus founded the company in Cologne. In 1871 his son-in-law joined the company. The coatings business extended. After Robert Friedrich Haarhaus died in 1874 the company was renamed in Deutsch-Englische Lackfabrik. In 1899 Arthur Herbig's sons, Arthur Herbig and Adolf Herbig junior joined the company.

In 1903 the company was relocated to a new, modern production location on the Vitalisstraße in Cologne-Bickendorf, that is still used as German main plaint. In 1904 Herbolin Flüssiges Porzellan was registered as trademark and became one of the first big German white-varnish-trademarks as well as Kristallweiß (Glasurit), Eburit (Beck & Co.) and Alpinaweiß (Deutsche Amphibolin-Werke). In 1910 the company employed 80 workers.

=== Development and years of war ===
In 1910 Herbol produced outside of Cologne for the first time. In Vienna and Paris Herbol products were manufactured under licence. In 1912 Arthur Herbig assumed the leadership of the company. A new colour factory was opened in Cologne in 1923, where in 1930 already 180 employees produced around 330 different products.

In World War II the main factory was known as war-strategic company, because it produced protective mimicry on a large scale. After a couple of air attacks 80 percent of the factory in Cologne were destroyed. After the surrender of the German the branches in Vienna, Berlin and Milan were expropriated. In August 1945 the production already started again in Cologne.

=== Post-war-years ===
In 1952 Herbol started to produce dispersion paints. From 1945 synthetic resin was produced in the new built resin factory. During the following ten years the production of Herbig-Haarhaus expanded. New branches in Würzburg and Switzerland were commissioned. In 1955 Hans Herbig died; for the first time no bearer of the traditional name Herbig was to be found. During the next three years Erich Zschocke informed the company. The collection of the passionate fancier of hand-painted porcelain and varnished objects, together with the collection of Kurt Herberts, later paved the way for the collection of the Museum für Lackkunst (Museum for Lacquer Art) in Münster. In 1957 the Herbol-logo was redesigned by the American designer Raymond Loewy (Coca-Cola bottle, Lucky Strike). It showed the Herbol lettering within a paintbrush.

=== Sale and younger history ===
In 1968 the Herbig family sold the company to BASF and Bayer. In 1969 the blue logo was introduced as second brand label besides the paintbrush. BASF completely took over the branches in Cologne and Würzburg in 1970. Under new management the renewal and expansion of the trademark Herbol continued. After an extensive reorganisation and an increasing international orientation of the coatings business Herbol became part of the new founded Deco GmbH in 1997.

In 1999 the European coatings business of BASF was taken over by AkzoNobel. The new founded Akzo Nobel Deco GmbH managed Herbol from Cologne, distributing the trademark in many European countries. In 2007, together with BASF, the façade paint Herbol-Symbiotec was introduced as „first real Nano-façade-paint“. Since 2010 all of Herbol's coatings follow the VOC-regulations.

== Business segments ==
Herbol belongs to AkzoNobel. The product range is distributed via free wholesale and specialised trade as well as the trademarks’ own distributor, AkzoNobel Farbe & Heimtex. Herbol is a recognized trademark in many European countries, i.e. in Austria, Switzerland, France and Belgium. It was successfully introduced to Italy. In 2011 it was officially introduced to the Netherlands.
