= Martin Brudermüller =

German businessman (born 1961)

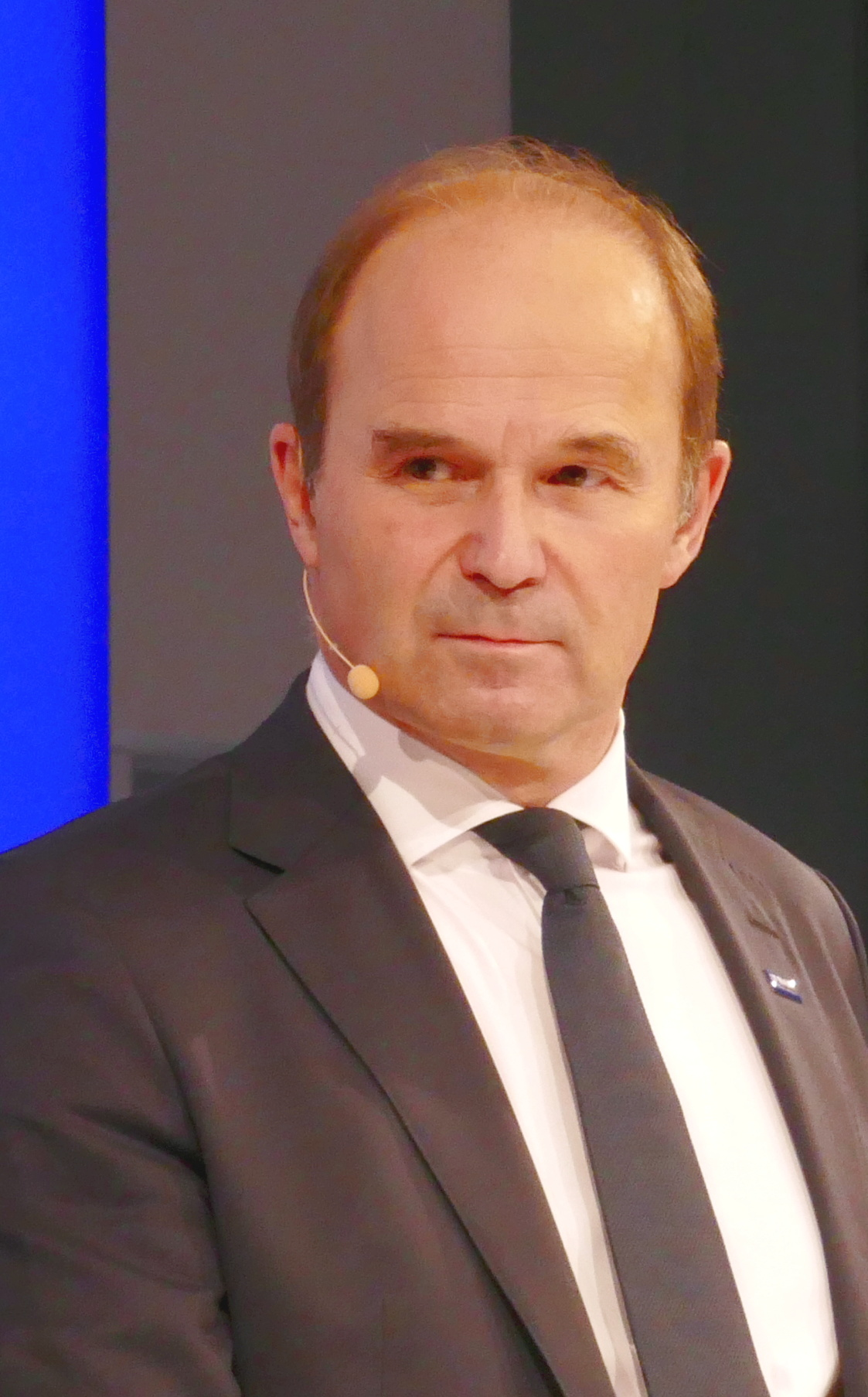
- Brudermüller in 2018
- Born: 5 May 1961 (age 65); Stuttgart, West Germany
- Education: Doctorate in chemistry
- Alma mater: University of Karlsruhe, Germany; University of California, Berkeley, US
- Title: CEO, BASF
- Term: 2018-2024
- Predecessor: Kurt Bock
- Successor: Markus Kamieth

Martin Brudermüller (born 5 May 1961) is a German businessman who was the CEO of BASF from 2018 to 2024.

== Early life ==
Brudermüller was born in Stuttgart on 5 May 1961. He earned a bachelor's degree and a doctorate in chemistry from the University of Karlsruhe, Germany, in 1985 and 1987 respectively. He did postdoctoral research at the University of California, Berkeley, US.

== Career ==
Brudermüller joined BASF in 1988 and worked as a chemist in the ammonia laboratory. In 1993, he moved to the New Business Development / Marketing division in the Intermediates division. In 1995 he was delegated to BASF Italia Spa, Milan, as Head of Marketing and Sales Pharma Intermediates. From 1997 he was staff to the vice chairman of the board. After working as productions director for fat-soluble vitamins in the Fine Chemicals division from 1999, he was promoted in the following years to Senior Vice President Strategic Planning BASF Group and President Functional Polymers Division. Since 2006 he is member of the Board of Executive Directors of BASF Aktiengesellschaft (since January 14, 2008 BASF SE).

In 2011, Brudermüller became Vice Chairman of the Board of Executive Directors of BASF SE and from 2015 also Chief Technology Officer. From 2018 he was chairman of the board of executive directors and chief technology officer (CTO).

Brudermüller was nominated by the Christian Democratic Union (CDU) as delegate to the Federal Convention for the purpose of electing the President of Germany in 2022.

After Russia invaded Ukraine, Brudermüller strongly opposed a proposed EU ban on Russian gas imports. He said it would destroy the German economy. BASF has sizeable investments in the Russian natural gas industry and partners with Gazprom. The German central bank said it would reduce German GDP for the year by 5% while other economists said it would reduce German GDP by 0.3 to 3%.

In his capacity as CEO, Brudermüller accompanied Chancellor Olaf Scholz on a state visit to China in 2022.

== Other activities ==
=== Corporate boards ===
- Mercedes-Benz, Member of the Supervisory Board (since 2024)

=== Non-profit organizations ===
- Munich Security Conference (MSC), Member of the Security Innovation Board (since 2021)
- Max Planck Society, Member of the Senate
- European Round Table of Industrialists (ERT), Member

== Personal life ==
Brudermüller has been married since 1993.
