= Five Star Island =

Island in the Little Sound, Bermuda

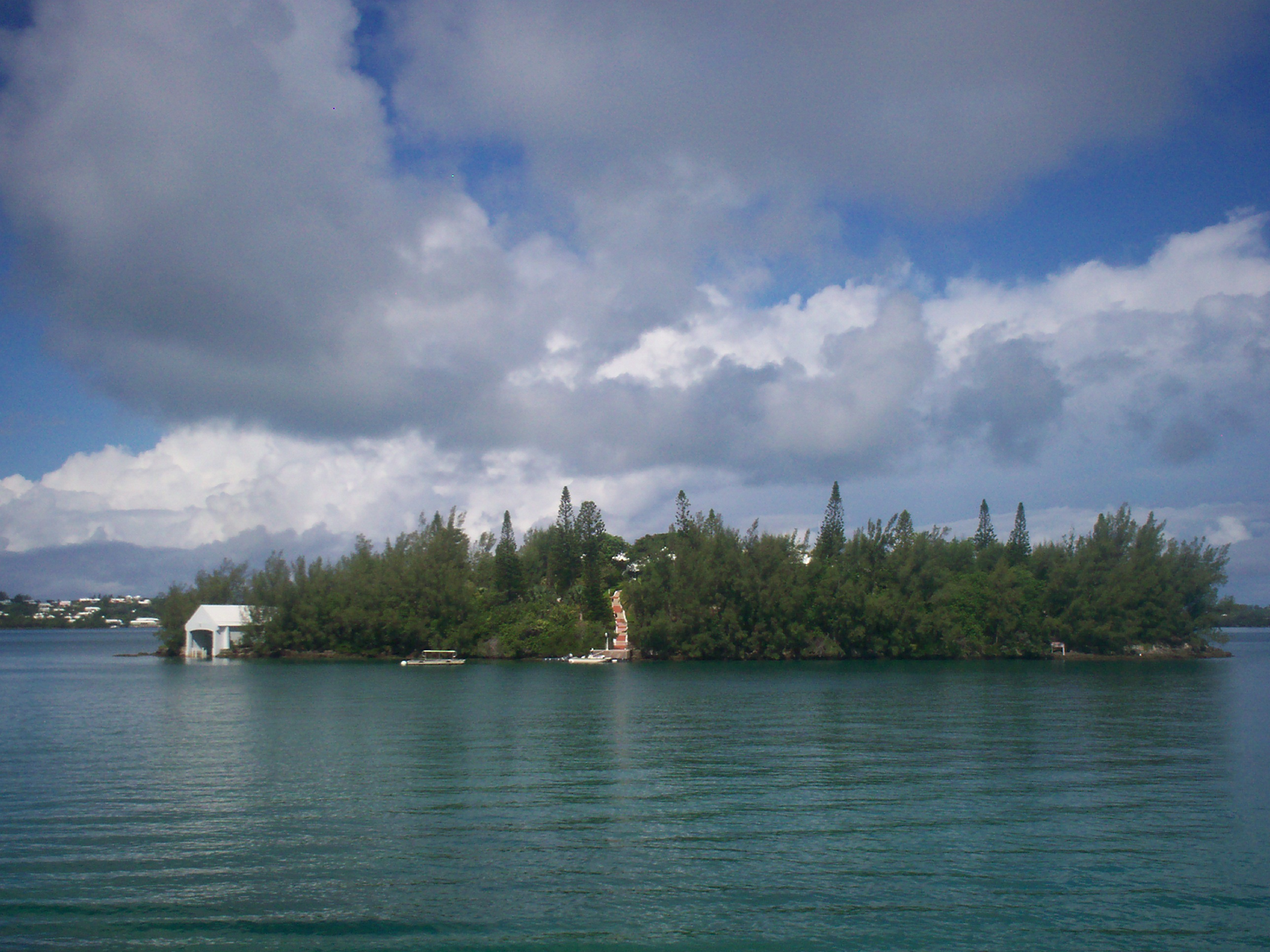

Geography
- Location: Little Sound
- Coordinates: 32°15′22″N 64°50′37″W
- Archipelago: Bermuda
- Area: 2.11 acres (0.85 ha)

Administration
- United Kingdom
- British Overseas Territory: Bermuda
- Parish: Southampton

Five Star Island is a privately owned, 2.11-acre island in the Little Sound, in Southampton Parish, Bermuda. It was owned by the Wilson family from the 17th to 19th century, and was then known as Wilson's Island. The circumstances of the Wilson family's loss of the island is disputed, with family members claiming it was put up as collateral for potato slips that were destroyed by potato blight, and existing historical records stating the island was legally sold.

== Geography ==
Five Star Island has an area of 2.11 acres and is situated in the Little Sound on the north coast of Bermuda, in the parish of Southampton.

== History ==
According to Edward Durrant, a local elder, the island was owned by the Wilson family from at least the 17th century until the 19th century. The circumstances of the Wilson family's loss of ownership is disputed. Surviving records state that the island was sold by Joseph Wilson ("Uncle Joe"), the final owner from the Wilson family, to Jane Soltan, an American citizen, in the 19th century. The island's ownership then changed hands multiple times throughout the years, to Charles Cooper, Morris Gibbons, Alfred Leman, and finally to Curt Engelhorn, a German billionaire businessman and philanthropist. During his time in Bermuda, Engelhorn made large donations to the Bermuda College and the Bermuda Biological Station. However, the Wilson family asserts that Joseph Wilson never sold the island and it was taken through an informal transaction.

The Wilson family claims that Joseph Wilson gave the deeds to the island as collateral for a loan to acquire potato slips, with the agreement that he would repay the loan with ten barrels of harvested potatoes. However, a potato blight destroyed his crop, leaving him unable to fulfill the agreement. As a result, the deeds were not returned and ownership was lost. Another version of the story involves a group known as the "40 Thieves", described as members of Bermuda's merchant, banking, and legal elite, who allegedly facilitated or benefitted from the Wilson family's loss of property. No written contract or legal record of the transaction has been found, nor has litigation pertaining to the matter.

In 2012, Caroline Engelhorn submitted an application to the Bermuda government to acquire the island under Bermuda's land ownership laws.
