= International Paint =

British paint manufacturer

International Paint Ltd
- Company type: Limited company
- Industry: Paint
- Founded: 1881
- Founder: Max and Albert Holzapfel; Charles Petrie
- Headquarters: Gateshead, England
- Area served: Worldwide
- Products: Protective coatings, yacht paints, varnishes, mastics and sealants
- Revenue: ▲£211.1 million (2014)
- Parent: AkzoNobel
- Website: www.international-marine.com

International Paint, abbreviated as International, is a brand of the Marine & Protective Coatings business unit of AkzoNobel.

== History ==
In 1881, the German brothers Max and Albert Holzapfel, along with Charles Petrie, founded the Holzapfel Compositions Company Ltd in Newcastle upon Tyne, England, producing marine coatings for the local shipping industry. The name International was then coined as their paint brand. The company expanded, first moving to larger premises in Gateshead, and in 1904 to a large factory in Felling, where its modern-day headquarters are located.

As early as 1889, the company took production to Russia, Denmark, Italy and Germany, and in 1901 to the United States, where it was registered under the name International Paint Co. Inc. in New Jersey, with production taking place in Brooklyn, New York. In the period before the First World War, new factories were added in Sweden, France and Japan. During the war, the company was known as International Paints, and moved its headquarters to London, with further growth during the interwar period in Spain, Canada, Brazil, Mexico, Australia and New Zealand, and expansion into domestic and industrial paints.

In 1968, Courtaulds, having established a significant paints business and acquired International Paint, merged all its coating interests under the International name. The 1970s and 80s saw many additions, new markets and growth, as well as consolidations and disentanglements, and a reduction in the number of markets they supplied.

AkzoNobel took over Courtaulds in 1998 when the Coatings & Sealants division was Courtaulds' most profitable activity.

International Paint Limited were fined £650,000 and ordered to pay costs of £145,000 following the release of highly toxic tributyltin (TBT) biocidal antifouling compound from a storage tank at a former paint testing site at Newton Creek, Newton Ferrers on the River Yealm, Devon, United Kingdom.

== Operations ==
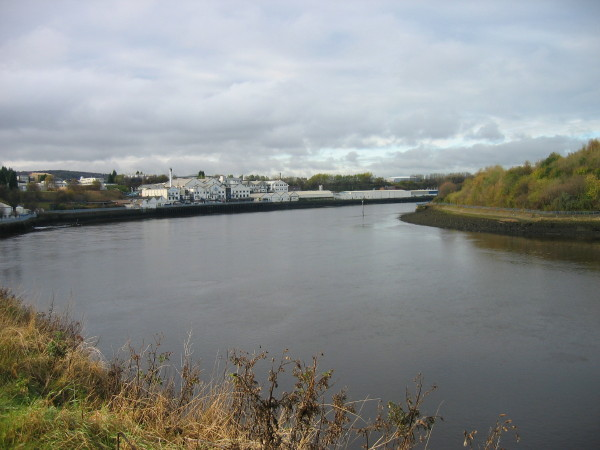
International Paint production site at Felling, Gateshead

International Paint is now the leading brand of AkzoNobel's Marine & Protective Coatings business unit, which has approximately 5,500 employees in more than 60 countries. The Felling site is the largest, with close to 1,000 employees, hosting the business unit headquarters, brand staffing and production, as well as the personnel of other AkzoNobel business units.

Factories supplying International Paint are located in approximately 30 countries, producing up to 1 million tons of coating annually.
