= Nobel Industries (Sweden) =

Swedish chemical company

- Company type: AB
- Industry: Chemical industry
- Predecessor: Bofors; KemaNobel
- Founded: 1984
- Defunct: 1994
- Fate: Merged with Akzo NV
- Successor: Akzo Nobel

Nobel Industries AB was a Swedish chemical company.

== History ==
Nobel Industries was incorporated in 1984 through the merger of Swedish weapons manufacturer Bofors and Swedish chemical company KemaNobel; both Bofors and KemaNobel had historic ties to the 19th-century Swedish chemist and inventor Alfred Nobel.

KemaNobel itself resulted from a number of acquisitions in 1970 by Fosfatbolaget: Liljeholmens Stearinfabriks chemicals business (Est. 1841), Barnängen Tekniska Fabrik AB (Est. 1868) and Casco (Est. 1928), changes its name to KemaNord, continuing with further acquisitions”: 1981 Pharos from AGA, a year later the paints group Nordsjö, in 1986 paper and pulp group Eka AB and in 1988 Berol Kemi from Procordia.

In the late 1980s, Nobel Industries divisions further acquired; Casco Nobel bought Sadolin & Holmblad in 1987, Parteks adhesives and joint compound operations in 1988 and English paints group, Crown Berger in 1990. In 1990, Pharos acquired American electronics group Spectra-Physics. Eka Nobel acquires Alby Klorat and Stora Kemi from Swedish forest group Stora Kopparberg, Albright and Wilson's paper chemicals division.

By the mid 1990s, the company had begun to divest itself of non-core businesses, streamlining itself: KVK Agro Chemicals was sold to Sandoz in 1991, the Nobel Consumer Goods (which consisted of: Barnängen Tekniska Fabrik, Liljeholms, Sterisol, and Vademecum, in the main) to the German group, Henkel, and NobelTech (the consolidated electronic business operation of the group) to Celsius Industries and lateron acquired by Saab AB in 2000.

In 1993, Dutch company Akzo N.V. agreed to acquire Nobel Industries for $1.73 billion. The merger was completed in 1994, forming Akzo Nobel.

== Companies part of history of Nobels Industry ==
- 1646 Bofors Swedish weapons manufacturer is founded in Karlskoga. In 1893, Bofors majority owned by Alfred Nobel.
- 1841 Liljeholmens Stearinfabrik, stearin candles factory, founded by Lars Johan Hierta (also the founder of the Swedish newspaper Aftonbladet) in Stockholm Sweden. Acquired in 1947 by "Stokholms Superfosfast Fabrik". In 1970, candle production moves to Oscarshamn. Chemica business acquired 1970 by Fofatbologet.
- 1868 Barnängen Tekniska Fabrik AB, soap factory at Bondegatan on Södermalm in Stockholm. Acquired 1970 by Fofatbologet.
- 1871 Stockholms Superfosfat Fabrik, superphosphate factory is founded by Oscar F. Carlson – with help from Lars Johan Hierta – in Gäddviken, Nacka outside Stockholm. Ends in 1931 its Swedish superphosphate production and opens a new potassium nitrate factory opens a year later in Ljungaverk. Begins 1941 begins Swedish production of carbide and calcium nitrate at a new plant in Stockvik. Starts in 1944 making plastics and trial production of synthetic rubber. Opens in 1945 opens a PVC plant at Stockvik. In 1964 Stockholms Superfosfat Fabriks becomes Fosfatbolaget. 1970 renamed to KemaNord, rename to KemaNobel in 1978
- 1928 Casco, adhesives factory, producing of casein glue, founded by Lars Amundsen (nephew of Roald Amundsen, the first person at the South Pole) in Kristinehamn. Acquired 1970 by Fofatbologet.
- 1863 Nitroglycerin, stearin candles factory is founded by Alfred Nobel in Stockholm. In 1965 Swedish civil explosives chemical group Nitroglycerin becomes Nitro Nobel. Acquired 1978 by KemaNord
- 1895 Elektrokemiska Aktiebolaget (abbreviated EKA), Swedish for electrochemical corporation, is founded by Alfred Nobel (founder of the Nobel Prize), C. W. Collander, and Rudolf Liljeqvist (who becomes Managing Director) in Bengtsfors, Sweden. The first products are chlorine and alkali. Moves in 1924 moves to Bohus, north of Gothenburg, Sweden. In 1927 starts production of water glass. In 1930 adds expanded product range – i.e., ferric chloride, hydrochloric acid and hydrogen peroxide. In 1951 is acquired by the Swedish forest company, Iggesunds Bruk AB. Starts in 1956 with ammonia. Acquired in 1986 by Nobel Industries Sadolin & Holmblad
- 1777 Holmblad & Co., Danish paints company, founded by Swedish born Jacob Holmblad in Copenhagen. Acquired in 1912 by Sadolin
- 1907 Sadolins Farver , paints company, founded by Gunnar Asgeir Sadolin in Copenhagen. 1946 founds Kemisk Vaerk Köge, A/S (KVK). In 1987 acquired by Nobel Industries
- 1937 BerolSwedish producer of coatings for fishing lines is founded by fishing enthusiast Bernström and his friend Olson, a chemist, to make coatings to reinforce cotton fishing lines in Södertälje, and within a few years, Berol, whose name is derived from the first letters of the founders' last names, is established as a manufacturer of waterproofing agents for shoes, leather jackets and sheepskin. In 1945, Berol moves to Mölndal, and begins producing non-ionic, surface active products for washing powder as well as adhesives and paint improvers. In 1945 Mo och Domsjö AB (MoDo) buys Berol. MoDO is a Swedish forest products company. In 1971, it is renamed MoDoKemi and headquartered in Stenungsund. In 1973, MoDoKemi is acquired by Statsföretag' (later called Procordia), and renamed Berol Kemi. In 1974 Berol Kemi acquires from MoDo the production units of cellulose derivatives at Domsjö, near Örnsköldsvik. In 1988 Berol Kemi is acquired by Nobel Industries.
- 1899 The Wallpaper Manufacturer’s Company (WPM) is founded by a cooperative of wallpaper manufacturers. In 1915 the Walpamur Company paint company is created. In 1965 it is acquired by Reed International under the brand Crown Wallpaper and Crown Paints. Since 1975 Crown Wallpaper and Corown Paints are united as a division: Crown Decorative Products. In 1987, Crown Decorative Products is acquired by Williams Holdings from Hoechst
- 1760: Lewis Berger & Sons was founded. In 1969 Lewis Berger & Sons, was merged into the renamed Berger, Jenson & Nicholson
- 1840 Jenson & Nicholson was founded. In 1969, merger to Berger, Jenson & Nicholson
- 1969 Berger, Jenson & Nicholson. In 1988, acquired by Williams Holdings forms division Crown Berger Ltd. In 1990, acquired by Nobel Industries
