= Friedrich Engelhorn =

German businessman

- Born: July 17, 1821; Mannheim, Grand Duchy of Baden
- Died: March 11, 1902 (aged 80); Mannheim, Grand Duchy of Baden
- Occupation: Industrialist
- Known for: Founder of BASF

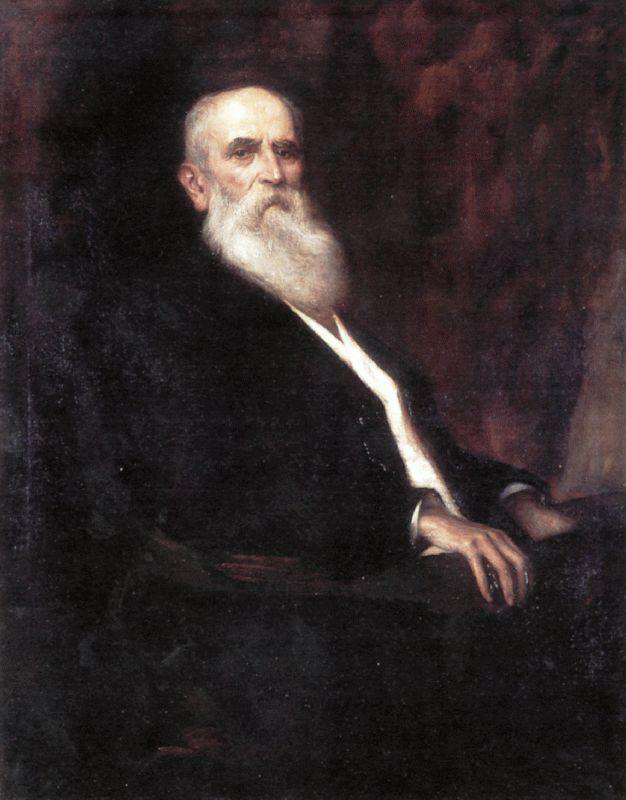
Friedrich Engelhorn about 1900

Friedrich Engelhorn (17 July 1821 – 11 March 1902) was a German industrialist and founder of BASF in Ludwigshafen.

== Early life ==
Friedrich Engelhorn was born on 17 July 1821 in Mannheim, where his father was a head brewer and pub owner. At the age of nine, he started attending the local lyceum, but left the school four years later and took up a 3-year apprenticeship to become a goldsmith. In 1847 after travelling to Mainz, Frankfurt, Munich, Vienna, Geneva, Lyon and Paris as a wandering journeyman, Engelhorn opened a goldsmith’s shop in his hometown.

Due to economic upheaval resulting from the 1848 revolution, his goldsmithery business began to deteriorate, which led him in summer of 1848 to establish with his two partners in Mannheim a private gasworks that produced and sold bottled gas used for lighting pubs and workshops. Because of his experience with gas manufacture, in 1851 Engelhorn was put in charge of building a new public gasworks in Mannheim; subsequently he became its manager after the works started operation in December of that year.

== As director of BASF ==
In 1856 William Henry Perkin discovered a process to make the first commercial synthetic organic dye from aniline in the coal tar distillate. Engelhorn quickly realised that there was a business opportunity for application of Perkin`s discovery to the large amounts of coal tar (resulting from manufacture of lighting gas from coal) - consequently, he founded a small aniline and dyestuff factory not far away from the Mannheim gasworks. In 1861 that factory began producing fuchsin.

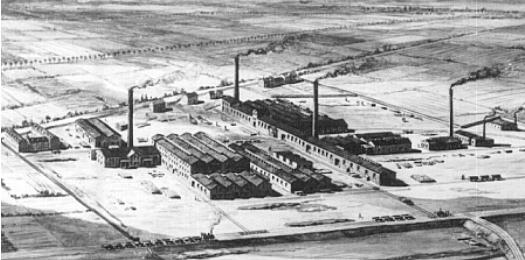
BASF plant in Ludwigshafen in 1866

Four years later Engelhorn wanted to enlarge his engagement in the chemical industry and with several partners, he founded the “Badische Anilin- & Soda-Fabrik” (BASF) on 6 April 1865. But the businessmen had problems finding a location for their new company. At first, they wanted to buy ground in Mannheim, but their bid failed because of the town council, which was not willing to sell land for the new factory. The day after its decision Engelhorn, who had become commercial director of the corporation, went to neighboring Ludwigshafen and bought ground there.

The new venture was a great success and soon became an important chemical company. Two years after its foundation BASF employed already more than 300 workers. It was only a few years before the first steps towards a multinational company were made. In 1873 a sales office was set up in New York. Three years later a production site in Butirki near Moscow was opened and in 1878 a French factory in Neuville-sur-Saône was taken over.

From the beginning, BASF was engaged in the chemical research. On behalf of Friedrich Engelhorn in 1868 the company appointed the chemist Heinrich Caro as first head of its laboratory. In collaboration with professor Carl Graebe and Carl Liebermann from Berlin University the first synthetic dyestuff alizarin was discovered. Finally, in 1869 the path-breaking discovery was patented in Prussia, France and England.

== Later years ==
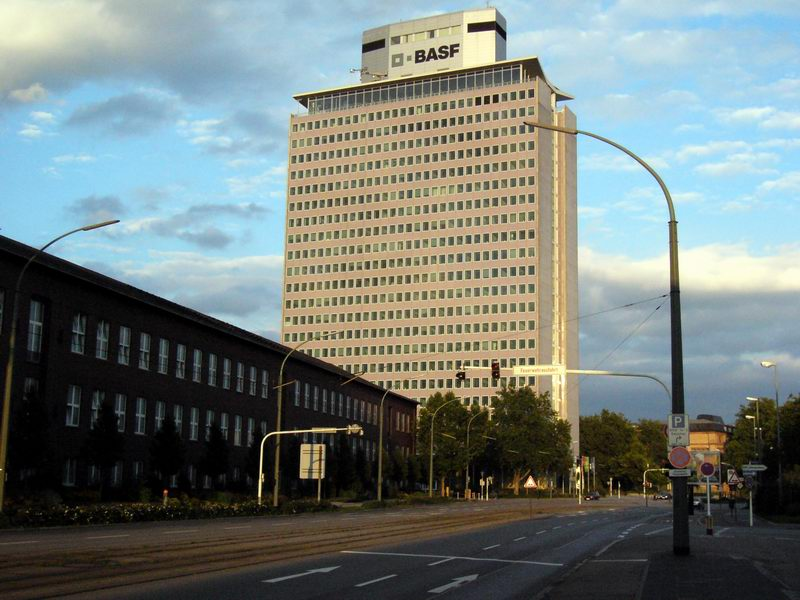
Friedrich Engelhorn Building

After quarrels with his partners, Engelhorn moved from managing to the supervisory board of BASF in 1884 and left the company a year later. In 1883 he had already bought the medical firm ’’Boehringer und Söhne’’ in Mannheim. In the same year, his oldest son became head of this factory.

Engelhorn was a member of the supervisory boards of other companies like the ’’Deutsche Zelluloidfabrik’’ (German Celluloidfactory) in Eilenburg in Saxonia, too.

On 11 March 1902 Friedrich Engelhorn died in Mannheim. He was a Christian.

In 1957 the new commercial department of BASF, which is a high-rise of 101 meters and a landmark of the Ludwigshafen site, was named after him.

== Literature ==
- Hippel, Wolfgang von: Becoming a Global Corporation – BASF from 1865 to 1900, in: Abelshauser, Werner (ed.), German Industry and Global Enterprise – BASF: The History of a Company, Cambridge 2004, p. 5-35.
