= Bombing of Ludwigshafen and Oppau in World War II =

Ludwigshafen and Oppau World War II bombings
- Part of Strategic bombing campaign in Europe
Date	1944-1945
Location	Ludwigshafen, Oppau

Belligerents
(United States) USAAF (United Kingdom) RAF Bomber Command	(Nazi Germany) Luftwaffe

Commanders and leaders
Carl Spaatz Arthur Harris	

The bombing of Ludwigshafen and Oppau in World War II attacked several strategic targets in the area, including targets of the Oil Campaign of World War II. Ludwigshafen oil plants were managed by Dr. Wurster of the Ludwigshafen Military Government, and their chief function was to improve "gasoline quality by dehydrogenation" using the DHD process. Ludwigshafen also refined "30-50 tons/day of crude oil...brought in from Brücksel, near Karlsruhe...to products including lube oils." About 2.5 miles away from Ludwigshafen, an Oppau plant produced fertilizer and up to "800 T/day nitrogen as ammonia and a considerable part of this was exported as liquid ammonia to Hochst, Wolfen and Bittefeld." A separate Oppau plant produced up to 60 T/day of urea. Dr. Gogel was head of the "high pressure department" at Oppau. After visiting the Ludwigshafen and Oppau factories from March 25–31 and 27–30 May, in August 1946, a post-war team published the Report On Investigations by Fuels and Lubricants Teams At The I.G. Farbenindustrie, A. G., Works, Ludwigshafen and Oppau.

Ludwigshafen and Oppau World War II bombings
Date	Result
December 30, 1943	The 447th BG bombed the Ludwigshafen "chemical plant".
January 7, 1944	The 445th BG, flying B-24's, sent 28 aircraft to bomb the chemical works.
	The 447th BG bombed the Ludwigshafen "oil refinery". Of 1,700 bombs dropped, only 127 hit the Farben plant.
March 31, 1944	The 447th BG bombed Ludwigshafen.
August 26, 1944	Mission 576: 41 B-24s bomb the Ludwigshafen "chemical works".
September 3, 1944	Mission 601: 325 of 345 B-17s bombed the "Ludwigshafen/Opau" synthetic oil plant.
September 5, 1944	Mission 605: 277 of 303 B-17s hit a Ludwigshafen "synthetic oil plant".
September 8, 1944	Mission 611: 348 of 384 B-17s attacked the "Ludwigshafen/Opau oil refinery."
September 13, 1944	Mission 628: 74 B-17s bombed the "oil refinery" at Ludwigshafen
September 21, 1944	Mission 644: 147 of 154 dispatched B-17s bombed the "synthetic oil plant at Ludwigshafen/Opau". The Bergius plant at Ludwigshafen was much smaller than the other Bergius process plants.
September 25, 1944	Mission 647: B-17s, including those of the 447th BG, bombed the Ludwigshafen/Opau "synthetic oil plant" and the "marshalling yard" at Ludwigshafen.
September 27, 1944	Mission 650: 214 B-17s bombed the "Ludwigshafen/Opau oil refinery".
October 3, 1944	Mission 662: 13 of 87 B-17s dispatched to hit the oil refinery at Wesseling bombed a Ludwigshafen target of opportunity.
November 4, 1944	The 447th BG bombed the Ludwigshafen "oil refinery".
January 1945	1,000 high explosive bombs and 10,000 incendiaries fell within the factory fences, starting 10 large, 30 medium and 200 small fires. Bombs that missed the factory that day ruined 354 residences and dehoused 1,800 people.
