= AkzoNobel =

Dutch paints and performance coating business

Coordinates: 52°20′24″N 4°52′16″E

Akzo Nobel N.V.

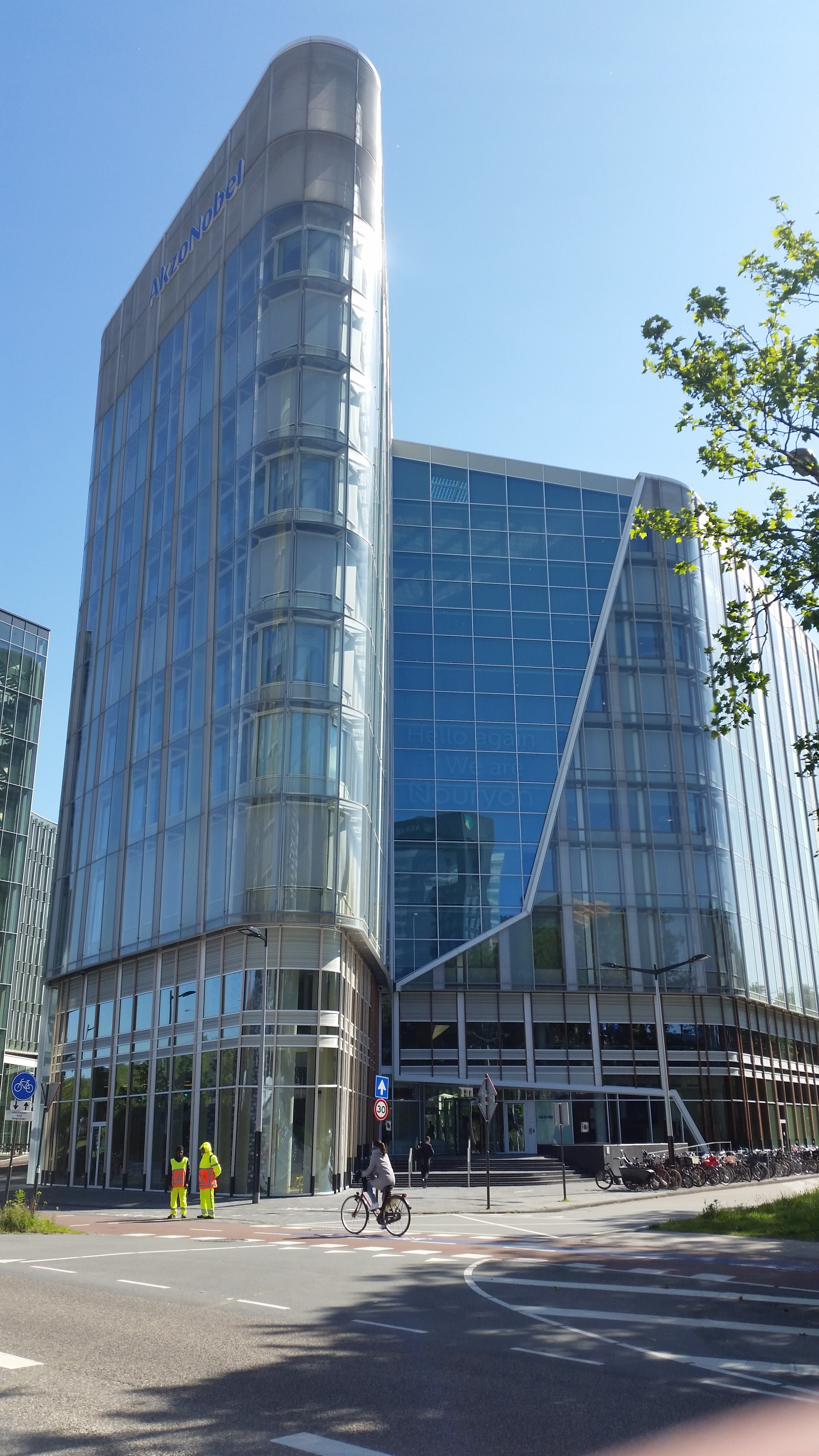
- AkzoNobel's headquarters in Amsterdam
- Type: Public
- Traded as: Euronext Amsterdam: AKZA; AEX component
- Industry: Chemicals
- Predecessor: Akzo NV; Nobel Industries AB
- Founded: 1994; 32 years ago
- Headquarters: Amsterdam, Netherlands
- Area served: Worldwide
- Key people: Grégoire Poux-Guillaume (CEO); Ben Noteboom (chairman of the supervisory board)
- Products: Decorative paints; Performance Coatings, including liquid and powder coating; Industrial finishing products; Wood Adhesives
- Brands: Dulux, Sikkens, Interpon, International, Awlgrip, Zweihorn, Chemchraft
- Revenue: ▼€10.158 billion (2025)
- Operating income: ▲€1,164 million (2025)
- Net income: ▲€671 million (2025)
- Total assets: ▼€13.952 billion (2025)
- Total equity: ▲€4.822 billion (2025)
- Number of employees: 33,500 (2025)
- Website: www.akzonobel.com

Akzo Nobel N.V., stylised as AkzoNobel, is a Dutch multinational company which creates paints and performance coatings for both industry and consumers worldwide. Headquartered in Amsterdam, the company has activities in more than 150 countries. AkzoNobel is the world's third-largest paint manufacturer by revenue after Sherwin-Williams and PPG Industries.

== History ==
AkzoNobel has a long history of mergers and divestments. Parts of the current company can be traced back to 17th-century companies.

=== History and formation of Akzo ===
Akzo was formed in 1969 as merger of Algemene Kunstzijde Unie (General Artificial Silk Union; AKU) and Koninklijke Zout Organon (Royal Salt Organon; KZO).

The AKU was formed in 1929 when the Vereinigte Glanzstoff-Fabriken (est. 1899) and Nederlandse Kunstzijdefabriek (ENKA, est. 1911) merged, forming Algemene Kunstzijde Unie (AKU). The latter faced, amongst others, technical problems in the manufacturing of synthetic fibers. Its founder, Jacques Coenraad Hartogs, turned to Dutch industrialist Rento Hofstede Crull for a solution for which Hofstede Crull provided the answer. They created a joint venture, the NV I.S.E.M., whose successes and profits laid the foundation for the ENKA's subsequent acquisitions and mergers and which was eventually absorbed by the AKU in 1938.

The other part of the merger, the KZO, was formed when Koninklijke Zout Ketjen merged with Koninklijke Zwanenberg Organon in 1967. The former was itself a merger of Koninklijke Nederlandse Zoutindustrie (KNZ) and Ketjen. The KNZ was formed in 1918 by Ko Vis as a salt producing company; a business that to this day plays an important role in AkzoNobel's activities. The other part, Koninklijke Zwanenberg Organon, was formed when Zwanenberg's Fabrieken (est. 1887), a meat export factory based in Oss merged with Organon, a pharmaceuticals company founded by Saal van Zwanenberg, also in Oss.

After the merger of AKU and KZO, Akzo made a number of other critical acquisitions; the chemical and leather subsidiaries of Armour and Company in 1970, Levis Paints in 1985, specialty chemicals division of Stauffer in 1987 and divested its polyamides and polyesters plastics engineering business to DSM in 1992. In 1993, Akzo formed a joint venture with Harrisons Chemicals (UK) Ltd a subsidiary of Harrisons & Crosfield.

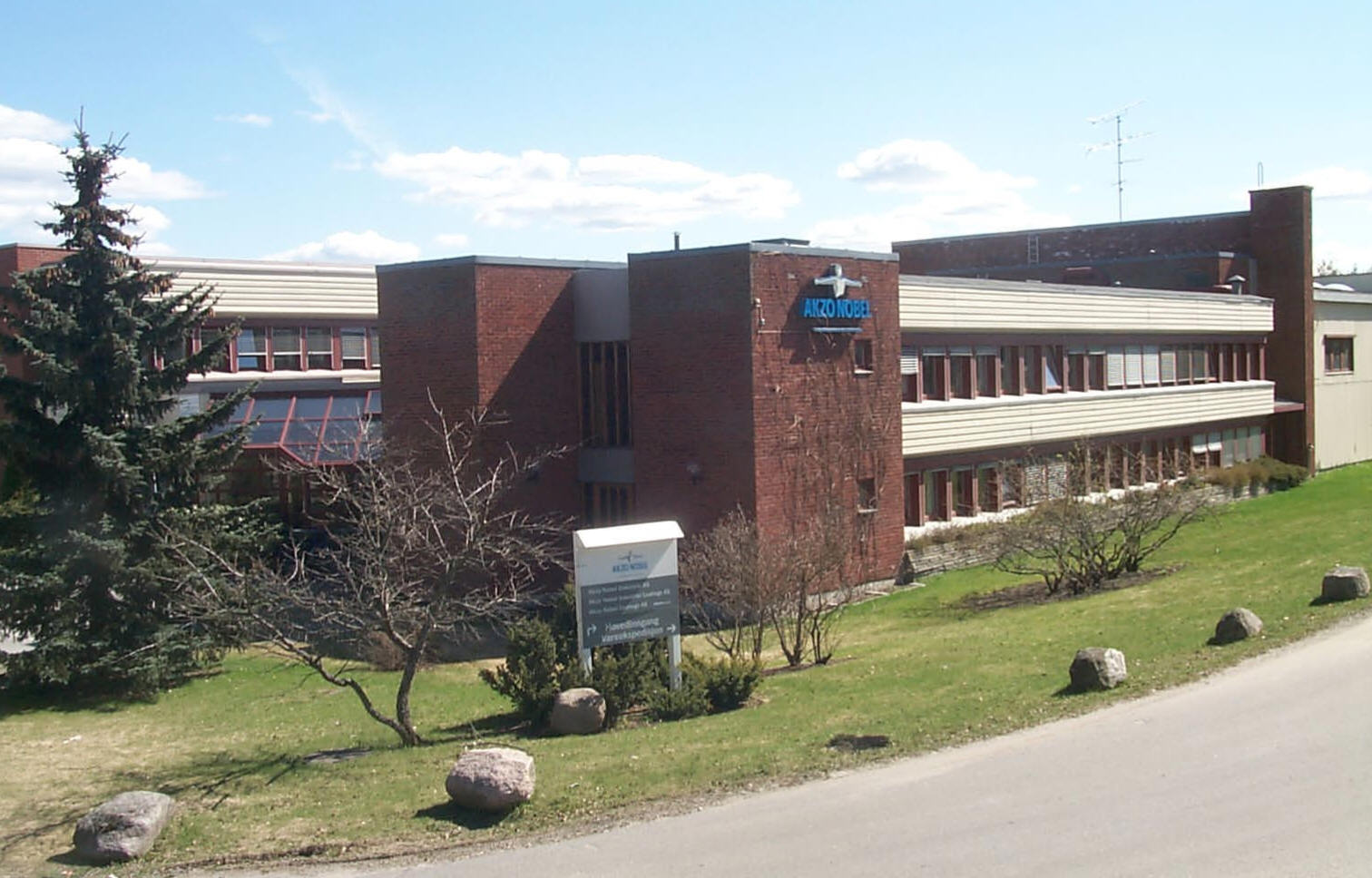
Oslo, Norway Factory

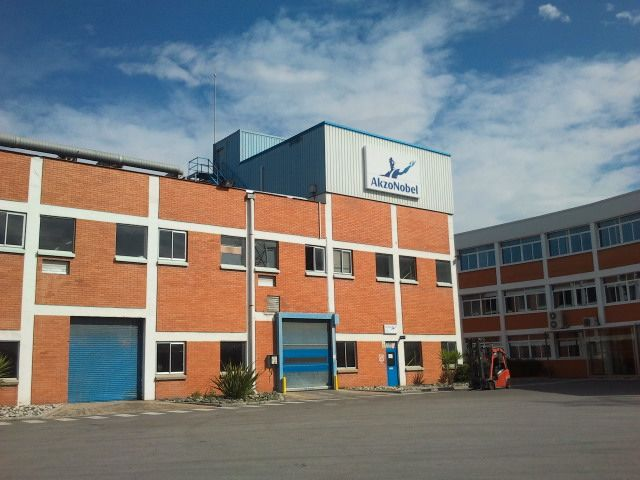
Barcelona, Spain Factory

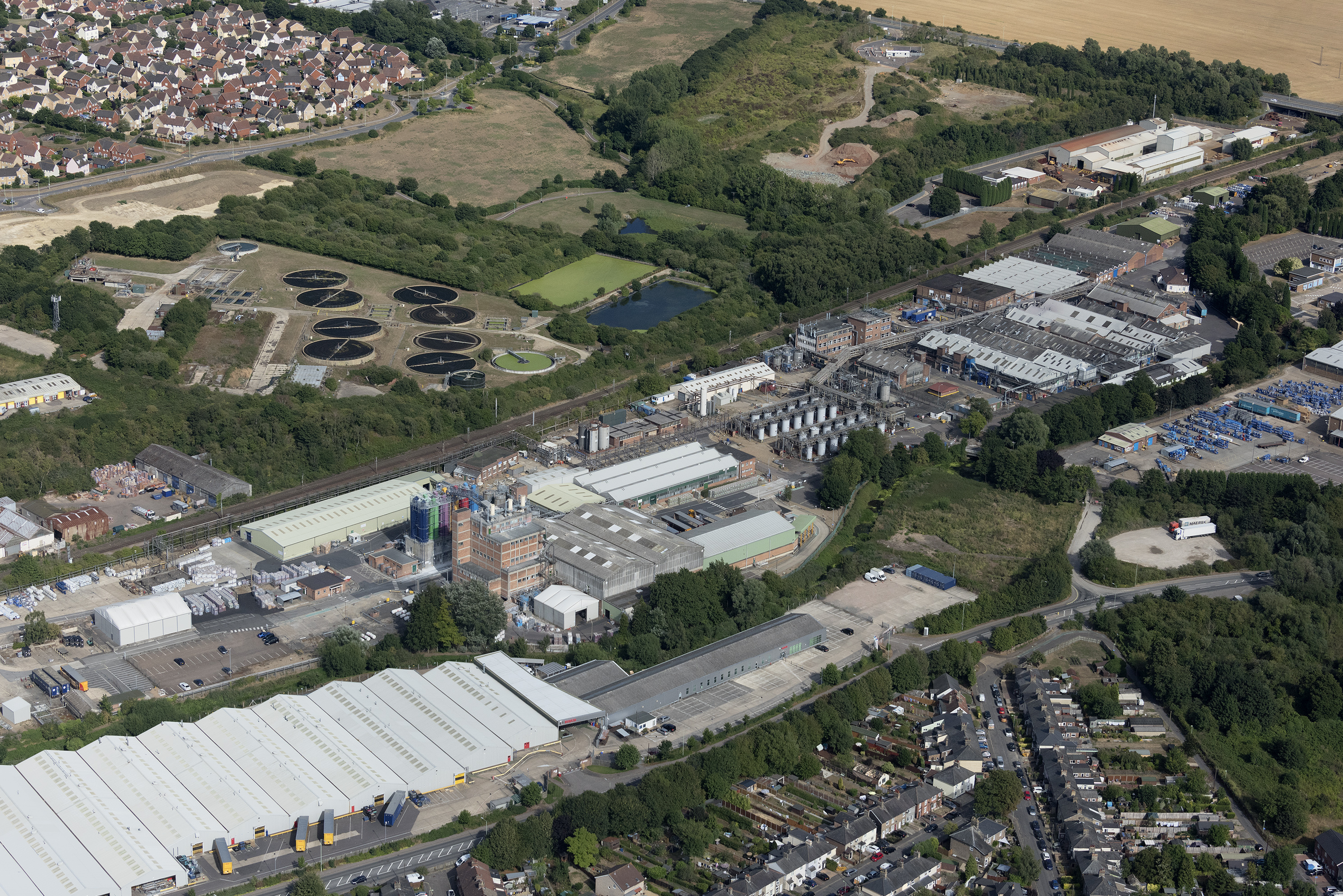
Suffolk, UK Factory

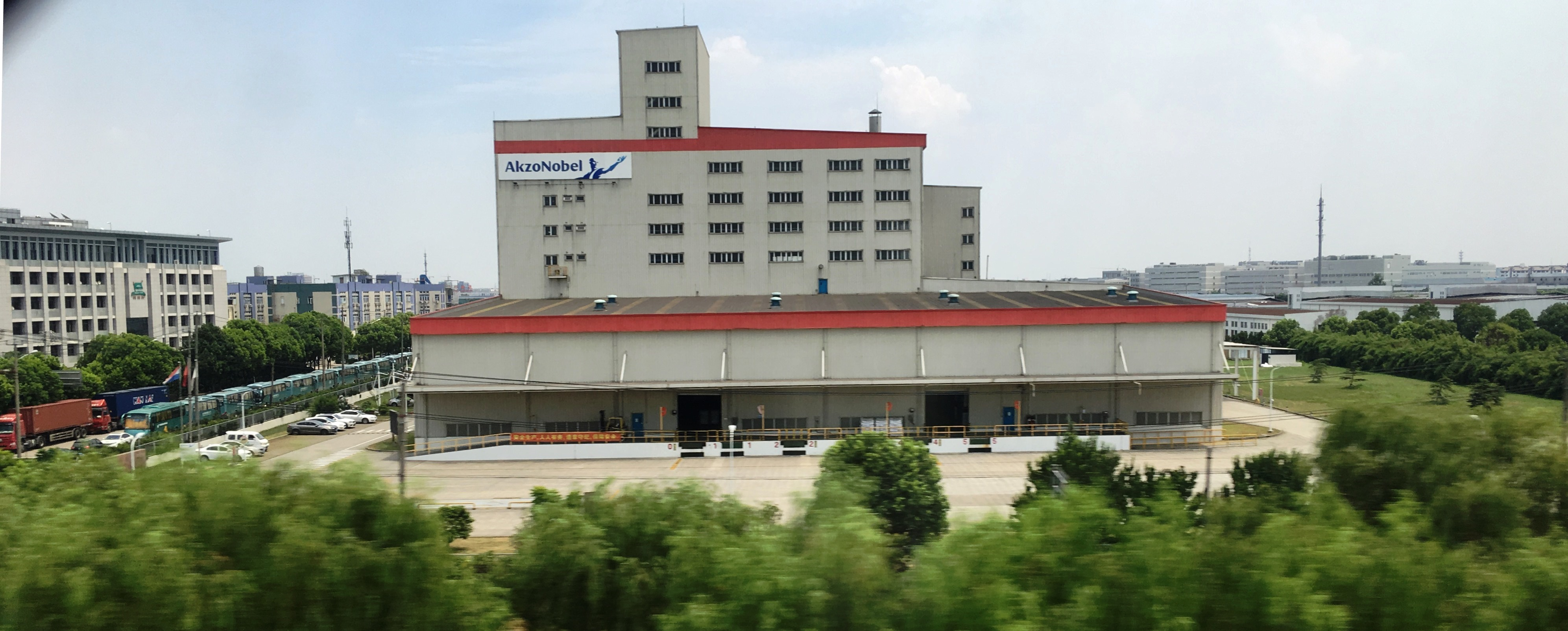
Shanghai, China Factory

=== AkzoNobel formation ===
In 1994 Akzo and Nobel Industries agreed to merge, forming Akzo Nobel, with the new combined entity having 20 business entities a number of divestments were made: Nobel Chemicals, Nobel Biotech and Spectra-Physics. In 1995 the PET resins business was sold to Wellman, Inc.. In 1996 the group sold the crop protection business to Nufarm. In 1998 the company acquired industrial coatings and in synthetic fiber company Courtaulds, later divesting Courtaulds industrial coatings and Daejen Fine Chemicals. Courtaulds was merged with Akzo Nobel Fibres forming Acordis, which in December 1999 was divested to CVC Capital Partners and then to be sold in 2000 to Teijin. Also in 1999 AkzoNobel acquired the pharmaceutical business of Kanebo.

In the early 2000s the company began another wave of divestitures, first in 2000 with its stake in Rovin's VCM and PVC business to Shin-Etsu Chemical. In 2001 divests ADC optical monomers business to Great Lakes Chemical, in 2002 its printing inks business, in 2004 its catalyst business to Albemarle Corp., in 2005 its Ink & Adhesive Resins to Hexion and UV/EB Resins to Cray Valley, in 2007 its Akcros Chemicals to GIL Investments. In 2006 the group acquired Canadian decorative and industrial coatings company, SICO Inc. and a year later Canadian industrial coatings company, Chemcraft International, Inc.

In 2007 Organon International was sold to Schering-Plough for €11 billion and AkzoNobel delisted its shares from the US NASDAQ stock market. In 2008 Crown Paints was sold in a management buyout.

In December 2012, AkzoNobel agrees to sell its North American Architectural Coatings business to PPG Industries for $1.1 billion.

=== Acquisition of Imperial Chemical Industries (ICI) ===
In 2008 AkzoNobel acquired British Imperial Chemical Industries (ICI) for $15.8 billion.

ICI can trace its history back to four British-based chemical companies; British Dyestuffs Corporation, Brunner, Mond & Company, Nobel Explosives and the United Alkali Company. which merged in 1926, forming ICI. A year later, the newly merged entity employed over 33,000 employees in five main product areas: alkali products, explosives, metals, general chemicals, and dyestuffs. In 1933 the company developed polyethylene, which is later patented and sold as an insulating material. In 1986 focusses to paint and specialty products with the purchase of Beatrice's Chemicals Division and Glidden Paint.

In 1993 ICI demerged its bioscience business, splitting into two the publicly listed companies: ICI and Zeneca. The latter would later go onto merge with Astra AB, forming the current pharmaceutical company, AstraZeneca.

In April 2008 Henkel acquired from AkzoNobel the adhesive part of National Starch and in June 2010, AkzoNobel divested the starch part of National Starch business to Corn Products International.

=== Attempted acquisition by PPG Industries ===
In March 2017, PPG Industries launched an unsolicited takeover bid of €20.9 billion, which was promptly rejected by AkzoNobel's management. Days later, PPG again launched an increased bid of €24.5 billion, which was again rejected by AkzoNobel's management. A number of shareholders urged the company to explore the offer and subsequent negotiations. In April, activist investor, Elliot Investors' called for the removal of Chairman Antony Burgmans following Akzo's refusal to submit to discussing with PPG. Elliott, which has a 3.25% stake in the company, claimed it was one of a group of investors that met the Dutch legal threshold of 10% voting-share support, which is needed to call an extraordinary meeting to vote on a proposal to remove Burgmans. On 13 April, Templeton Global Equity said it was among another group of investors calling for an extraordinary meeting of AkzoNobel shareholders to discuss Burgmans continued tenure as Chairman. Later, in the same month Akzo outlined its plan to separate its chemicals division and pay shareholders €1.6 billion in extra dividends, in order to attempt to hold-off PPG. The new Akzo strategy was dismissed by PPG, which claimed that their offer represented better value for shareholders, supported by activist Akzo shareholder, Elliot Advisors. On 24 April, a day before Akzo's annual meeting of shareholders, PPG increased its final offer by approximately 8% to $28.8 billion (€26.9 billion, €96.75 per share)—with Akzo's share pricing rising 6% to a record price of €82.95 per share. Akzo shareholder, Columbia Threadneedle Investments, urged the company to open dialogue with PPG, whilst PPG claimed that the deal would add to earning within its first year. Days later one of the UK's largest pension scheme investors, Universities Superannuation Scheme (USS), urged Akzo to engage with PPG. On 2 May, Reuters revealed that the supervisory board of Akzo was meeting to discuss how to deal with PPGs third offer, still maintaining it did not value the company highly enough.

In early May, Akzo again rejected PPGs bid, citing the deal still undervalued the company, as well as potentially facing antitrust risks, and not addressing other concerns such as "cultural differences". Under Dutch company law, PPG had to then decide to either make a formal bid or walkaway. In early June, PPG chose to walk away from the potential deal. As part of Akzo's defense to shareholders, many of whom pushed for the deal, chief executive Ton Büchner agreed to split Akzo in two and achieve increased financial targets. Büchner stepped down as CEO in July 2017, citing health reasons. He was succeeded by Thierry Vanlancker, former chief of the company's chemicals division.

=== Recent ===
The company AkzoNobel is focused on paints and coatings. On October 9, 2018 Specialty Chemicals was re-branded as a new company, Nouryon, after acquisition by the Carlyle Group.

International Paint Limited, owned by AkzoNobel, was in 2023 fined £650,000 and ordered to pay costs of £144,992 in a prosecution brought by the Environment Agency for allowing the banned highly toxic chemical tributyltin to be released into the river Yealm estuary at Newton Ferrers in 2015 and 2016.

In November 2025 it was announced that AkzoNobel would merge with Axalta. In August 2026, shareholders for both AkzoNobel and Axalta approved the companies’ proposed all-stock merger. Completion remains subject to regulatory approvals, with closing expected in late 2026 or early 2027.

== Organization ==
Due to high revenues from the sales of its pharmaceutical business, AkzoNobel was the world's most profitable company in 2008.

=== Decorative paints ===
AkzoNobel markets their products under various brand names such as Dulux, Sikkens, International and Interpon.

=== Performance coatings ===
AkzoNobel is a leading coatings company whose key products include automotive coatings, specialised equipment for the car repair and transportation market and marine coatings. The coatings groups consist of the following business units:

- Marine and Protective Coatings
- Automotive and Specialty Coatings
- Industrial Coatings
- Powder Coatings
- Cooling coatings that passively cool building surfaces by 10° C (18° F). It consists of a 2-layer coating system (both layers are water-based and low-VOC):
  - An aerogel mid-coat that features low thermal conductivity that blocks heat from penetrating a building
  - A radiative-cooling topcoat with high solar reflectance (to minimize absorption) and high thermal emittance (to radiate heat through the atmosphere into space)

=== Expancel ===
Expancel is a unit producing expandable microspheres under the tradename "Expancel Microspheres" within AkzoNobel, later spun off as part of Nouryon.

== Turnover and profit history ==
Year	Turn-over	Profit
2025	▼€10.2 billion	▲€671 million
2024	▲€10.7 billion	▲€592 million
2023	▼€10.7 billion	▲€483 million
2022	▲€10.8 billion	▼€378 million
2021	▲€9.6 billion	▲€865 million
2020	▼€8.5 billion	▲€671 million
2019	▲€9.3 billion	▲€539 million
2018	▼€9.3 billion	▼€6674 million
2017	▼€9.6 billion	▼€832 million
2016	▼€9.4 billion	▼€970 million
2015	▲€14.9 billion	▲€979 million
2014	▼€14.3 billion	▼€546 million
2013	▼€14.59 billion	▲€724 million
2012	▼€15.39 billion	▼€ -2.169 billion
2011	▲€15.70 billion	▼€541 million
2010	▲€14.64 billion	▲€754 million
2009	▼€13.03 billion	▲€285 million
2008	▲€15.42 billion	▼€ -1.08 billion
2007	▲€10.22 billion	▼€410 million
2006	▼€10.02 billion	▼€715 million
2005	▲€13.00 billion	▲€961 million
2004	▼€12.83 billion	▲€945 million
2003	▼€13.05 billion	▼€602 million
2002	▼€14.00 billion	▲€818 million
2001	▲€14.11 billion	▼€671 million

View source data.
View source data.

== See also ==
- Herbol, an industrial coating brand by AkzoNobel
- Twaron, trade name of aramid synthetic fiber
- Teijin Aramid, producer of Twaron, former AkzoNobel company
- GLARE, composite material patented by AkzoNobel
- List of companies in the Netherlands
- List of companies of Sweden
